= List of political parties in Luxembourg =

This article lists political parties in Luxembourg.

Luxembourg has a multi-party system with three strong political parties; two other moderately successful parties have emerged recently. No single party has a chance of gaining power alone, and parties must work with each other to form coalition governments.

== Current parties ==
The number given for local councillors is the total of councillors elected to communal councils that employ proportional representation. In majoritarian communes, parties do not usually run in the same manner, making comparisons difficult.

=== Parliamentary parties ===
Name Luxembourgish name	Abbr.	Ideology	Deputies	MEPs	Local
Alternative Democratic Reform Party; Alternativ Demokratesch Reformpartei	ADR	National conservatism; Luxembourgish language interests	5 / 60	1 / 6	9 / 722
Christian Social People's Party; Chrëschtlech-Sozial Vollekspartei	CSV	Christian democracy; Pro-Europeanism	21 / 60	2 / 6	192 / 722
Democratic Party; Demokratesch Partei	DP	Liberalism; Pro-Europeanism	14 / 60	1 / 6	134 / 722
The Greens; Déi Gréng	DG	Green politics	4 / 60	1 / 6	64 / 722
The Left; Déi Lénk	DL	Democratic socialism	2 / 60	0 / 6	6 / 722
Luxembourg Socialist Workers' Party; Lëtzebuerger Sozialistesch Aarbechterpartei	LSAP	Social democracy; Pro-Europeanism	12 / 60	1 / 6	154 / 722
Pirate Party Luxembourg; Piratepartei Lëtzebuerg	PPLU	Pirate politics	2 / 60	0 / 6	13 / 722

=== Non-parliamentary parties ===
Name Luxembourgish name	Abbr.	Ideology	Local
Communist Party of Luxembourg; Kommunistesch Partei Lëtzebuerg	KPL	Communism; Marxism–Leninism; Hard Euroscepticism	1 / 722
Fokus	Fokus	Pragmatism; Pro-Europeanism	0 / 722
The Conservatives; Déi Konservativ	DK	National conservatism; Economic liberalism	0 / 722
Volt Luxembourg; Volt Lëtzebuerg	Volt	European federalism; Pro-Europeanism	0 / 722

== Defunct parties ==
=== Pre-1945 parties ===
- Independent National Party
- Liberal League
- Left Liberals
- Party of the Right
- Radical Liberal Party
- Radical Party
- Socialist Party
- Volksdeutsche Bewegung

=== Post-1945 parties ===
- Communist League of Luxemburg, a Maoist party
- Enrôlés de Force, a single-issue party
- Free Party of Luxembourg, a right-wing populist party
- Green and Liberal Alliance, a green liberal party
- National Movement, a far-right party
- Party of the Third Age, a pensioners' party
- Popular Independent Movement, a single-issue party
- Revolutionary Socialist Party, a Trotskyist party
- Social Democratic Party, a social democratic party
- The Taxpayer, a libertarian party

== See also ==
- Politics of Luxembourg
- List of political parties by country
