= David Wagner (politician) =

Luxembourgish politician (born 1979)

The Honourable David Wagner
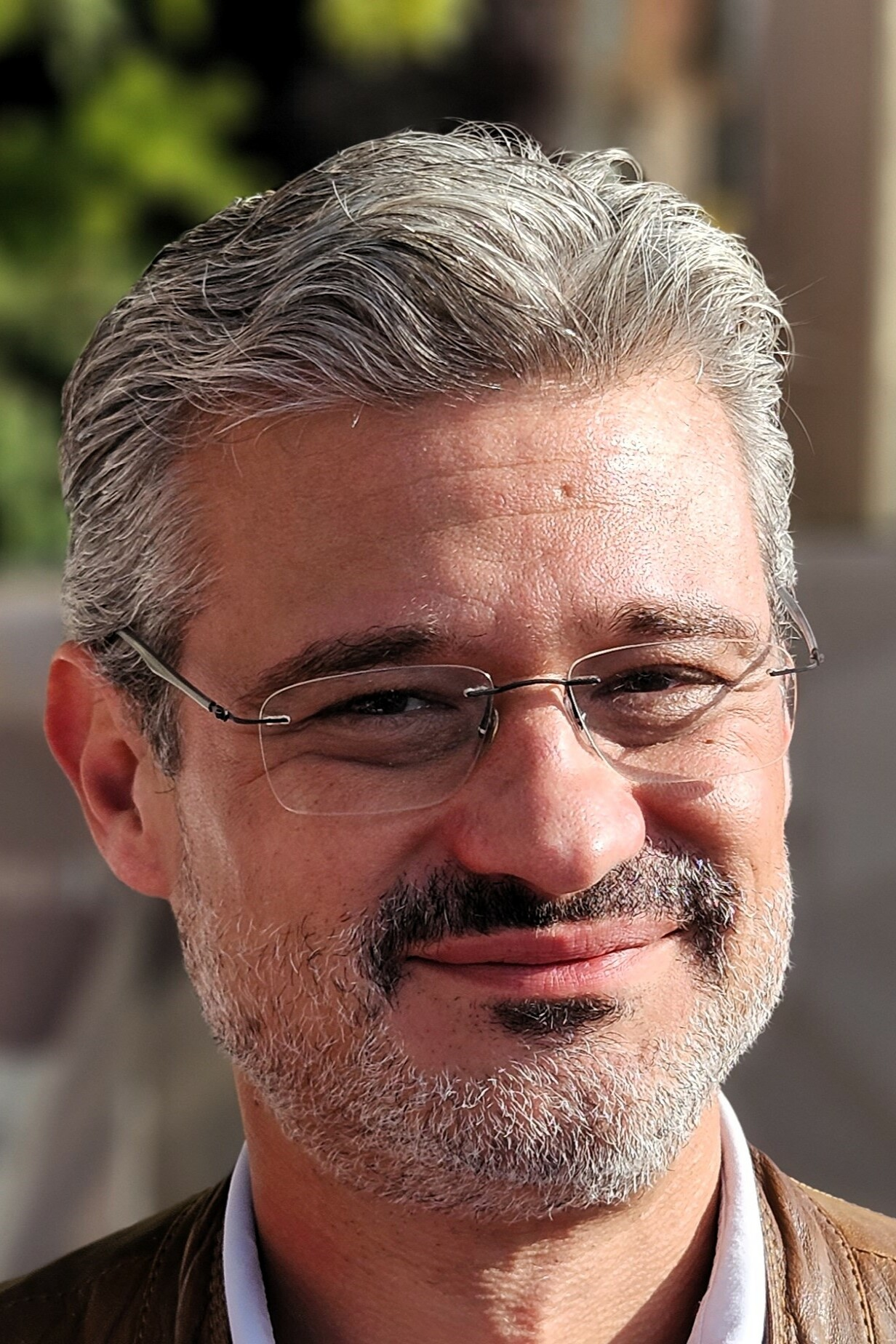

Member of the Chamber of Deputies
- In office 24 October 2023 – 14 October 2026
- Preceded by: Nathalie Oberweis
- Succeeded by: Ana Correia da Veiga
- Constituency: Centre
- In office 28 April 2015 – 19 May 2021
- Preceded by: Justin Turpel
- Succeeded by: Nathalie Oberweis
- Constituency: Centre

Member of the Luxembourg City Communal Council
- Incumbent
- Assumed office 30 September 2024
- Preceded by: Nathalie Oberweis
- In office 4 December 2017 – 28 September 2020
- Succeeded by: Ana Correia da Veiga
- In office 5 December 2011 – 26 January 2015
- Succeeded by: Joël Delvaux

Personal details
- Born: 3 March 1979 (age 47) Luxembourg City, Luxembourg
- Party: The Left (since 1999)
- Other political affiliations: LSAP (1996–1998); KPL (1994)
- Education: University of Luxembourg
- Profession: Journalist

David Wagner (born 3 March 1979) is a Luxembourgish politician and journalist. A founding member of The Left (déi Lénk), he served as a member of the Chamber of Deputies for the Centre constituency from 2015 to 2021, and again from 2023 to 2026. A Luxembourg City native, he has served three terms on the city's communal council, including since 2024.

== Biography ==
=== Education and professional career ===
Wagner was born on 3 March 1979 in Luxembourg City to a Luxembourgish father and a French mother from Marseille. He grew up in Mühlenbach and only spoke French at home, learning Luxembourgish in kindergarten. His father played for football club Avenir Beggen.

After attending the Lycée de Garçons in Luxembourg City, Wagner studied at the Centre Universitaire de Luxembourg, graduating with a degree in history in 2001, before working as a parliamentary assistant to déi Lénk Deputy Serge Urbany from 2002 to 2004. Wagner then worked as a journalist for the weekly newspaper Woxx starting in 2005, resigning in 2013 to return to his position as parliamentary assistant.

After resigning from the Chamber of Deputies in 2021, Wagner resumed his studies at the University of Luxembourg, obtaining a bachelor's degree in Medieval Studies in 2023.

=== Political career ===
At age 15, Wagner spontaneously visited the headquarters of the Communist Party of Luxembourg (KPL) where he was greeted by then-party president Aloyse Bisdorff, who convinced him to join. He only stayed in the KPL for around six months, choosing to join the LSAP in 1996 at the behest of Sascha Wagener. Wagner became around this time, participating in large student strikes against the rise in cost of the Jumbo youth public transit card and against changes to the organisation of vocational high schools. Having become general secretary of the LSAP's youth wing, he left the party in November 1998, judging it to have become too liberal after the designation of Robert Goebbels as lead candidate for the following year's general election.

On 30 January 1999, alongside representatives from a number of political factions to the LSAP's left, he was a founding member of déi Lénk, shortly before graduating high school. Wagner, similarly to prominent politicians like Gaston Thorn and Roy Reding, also served as president of the national student union UNEL from 2000 to 2002. At the time of the 2002 French presidential election, he campaigned for the Revolutionary Communist League, citing Alain Krivine and Daniel Bensaïd as political influences.

==== Municipal politics ====
Wagner first held elected office as a member of the Luxembourg Communal Council after the 2011 communal elections. Elected alongside Justin Turpel in a surge in support for déi Lénk, he promised the party would be "the social voice" on the council.

During his first term as a councillor, Wagner notably voiced opposition to the Royal-Hamilius building complex that was due to replace the city centre's bus terminal, criticizing it as a "high-end project" that, lacking in new living space, would fail to "guarantee social diversity". He resigned on 26 January 2015 in accordance with déi Lénk's rotation principle, and was replaced by trade unionist Jöel Delvaux, who became the first disabled communal councillor in Luxembourg.

In the 2023 communal elections, Wagner came a close second behind then-MP Nathalie Oberweis on déi Lénk's list, but as the party only won one seat, he was not directly elected. During the election campaign, he strongly criticized the Council of Aldermen's proposal to implement a partial begging ban and deploy private patrols in the city, accusing the CSV-DP majority of having "hearts of ice" and stating the need to "fight poverty and not the poor". Oberweis resigned from the council in September 2024, with Wagner replacing her and becoming a councillor for the third time.

==== National politics ====
Wagner stood on déi Lénk's electoral list for the Centre constituency in the 2004 and 2009 general elections, failing to be elected each time. In the 2013 snap election, the party won a seat in the Centre for the first time, but as Wagner only came second on the list behind fellow Luxembourg City communal councillor Justin Turpel, he was not directly elected. On 28 April 2015, Wagner took over Turpel's seat after the latter resigned on health grounds, thus becoming a member of the Chamber of Deputies for the first time.

Wagner left the Chamber of Deputies in May 2021, following the rotation principle of The Left; he was succeeded by Nathalie Oberweis.

In the 2023 general election, The Left managed to retain its 2 seats in the Chamber of Deputies, despite a decrease in vote share. Wagner, who was the party's co-lead candidate in the Centre, re-entered the Chamber alongside Marc Baum.
