= Jean Ersfeld =

Luxembourgish politician

Jean Ersfeld (born c.1953) is a politician from Luxembourg.

== Background and political stances ==
He founded the Free Party of Luxembourg (FPL) in 2003 and led it in Luxembourg's legislative elections in 2004. None of the FPL's candidates, including Ersfeld, was elected.

Ersfeld, like most of the FPL's candidates, is from the Oesling region of Luxembourg, a sparsely populated area which is characterized by its relative remoteness from the south of Luxembourg. Jean Ersfeld is a local personality with a limited following in that region, who previously stood for election for the leftist Déi Lénk. Since the FPL took an essentially right-wing nationalist position, this marked a notable political metamorphosis for Ersfeld.

After the FPL ceased to function, Ersfeld later ran for the Citizens' List in the 2009 Luxembourg general election.

Subsequently, Ersfeld stood as a candidate for déi Konservativ (en."The Conservatives") of politician Joe Thein for the South in the Luxembourg general election, 2018.

== See also ==
- Free Party of Luxembourg#Regionally based support: leadership and manifesto
