= Chantal Gary =

Luxembourgish politician (born 1988)

Member of the Chamber of Deputies
- In office 23 October 2019 – 24 October 2023
- Preceded by: Henri Kox
- Constituency: East

Personal details
- Born: 11 February 1988 (age 38) Luxembourg City, Luxembourg
- Party: The Greens
- Education: University of Innsbruck

Chantal Gary (born 11 February 1988) is a Luxembourgish geographer and politician of The Greens. From 2019 to 2023, she was a member of the Chamber of Deputies. She succeeded her uncle Henri Kox in the chamber, when he resigned to become Minister of Housing.

== Early life and career ==
Gary was born in Luxembourg City in 1988. She is the granddaughter of Élisabeth Kox-Risch, who was a member of the Christian Social People's Party until she began to protest the proposed Remerschen and Cattenom nuclear power plants, and was a candidate for The Greens in the 1999 and 2004 elections. Her grandmother's activism led her to become involved with politics. She studied geography in Montpellier, and graduated from the University of Innsbruck with a Master of Science. From 2016 to 2017, she worked for Fairtrade Lëtzebuerg, and from 2018 to 2019 she worked for the Verkéiersverbond.
