= 1994 European Parliament election in Luxembourg =

← 1989	12 June 1994	1999 →

6 seats to the European Parliament

The 1994 European Parliament election in Luxembourg was the election of MEP representing Luxembourg constituency for the 1994–1999 term of the European Parliament. It was part of the wider 1994 European election. It was held on 12 June 1994.

== Candidates ==
List #	Party	Existing seats
1	Luxembourg Socialist Workers' Party (LSAP)	2
2	National Movement	0
3	The Greens	0
4	Christian Social People's Party (CSV)	3
5	Action Committee for Democracy and Pensions Justice (ADR)	0
6	Communist Party (KPL)	0
7	Democratic Party (DP)	1
8	Group for the Sovereignty of Luxembourg (GLS)	0
9	New Left	0
10	Neutral and Independent Human Rights Party (NOMP)	0

== Results ==
Party	Votes	%	Seats	+/–
Christian Social People's Party	319,462	31.50	2	–1
Luxembourg Socialist Workers' Party	251,500	24.80	2	0
Democratic Party	190,977	18.83	1	0
The Greens	110,888	10.93	1	+1
Action Committee for Democracy and Pensions Justice	70,470	6.95	0	New
National Movement	24,141	2.38	0	0
Communist Party of Luxembourg	16,559	1.63	0	0
Group for the Sovereignty of Luxembourg	12,091	1.19	0	New
New Left	9,421	0.93	0	New
Neutral and Independent Human Rights Party	8,765	0.86	0	New
Total	1,014,274	100.00	6	0
Valid votes	178,643	90.06		
Invalid/blank votes	19,727	9.94		
Total votes	198,370	100.00		
Registered voters/turnout	224,031	88.55		
Source: Government of Luxembourg

=== Elected members ===
Christian Social People's Party

Members of the European People's Party

- Astrid Lulling
- Viviane Reding

Democratic Party

Members of the European Liberal Democrat and Reform Party

- Charles Goerens

The Greens

Members of the European Federation of Green Parties

- Jup Weber

Luxembourg Socialist Workers' Party

Members of the Party of European Socialists

- Ben Fayot
- Marcel Schlechter
