= 2011 Luxembourg communal elections =

The 2011 Luxembourgish communal elections were held on 9 October 2011. Elections are held every six years across all of Luxembourg's communes.

== Results ==
Winning party by municipality. CSV LSAP DP Others Municipalities using majoritarian system

In the chart below, '-' represents that the party did not run in that commune, whereas '0' represents that the party did run, but won no council seats. Results for communes using proportional representation only. The party system does not apply in the majoritarian communes, making comparisons difficult.

For the first time, Betzdorf, Frisange, Lorentzweiler, Roeser, Sandweiler, and Remich had populations over 3,000 each, meaning that their elections were held by proportional representation. Separate proportional elections were held in Bascharage and Clemency, despite Clemency not having the usual requisite population of 3,000, as the two were due to merge to form the new commune of Käerjeng on 1 January 2012.

Commune	CSV	LSAP	DP	Greens	ADR	Left	KPL	Other	Total
Bertrange (Council)	3	1	6	3	-	-	-	-	13
Bettembourg (Council)	4	6	1	2	-	-	-	-	13
Betzdorf (Council)	4	1	3	3	-	-	-	-	11
Contern (Council)	4	2	3	2	-	-	-	-	11
Diekirch (Council)	3	7	2	1	-	-	-	-	13
Differdange (Council)	3	4	7	3	0	1	1	-	19
Dippach (Council)	4	5	2	-	-	-	-	-	11
Dudelange (Council)	3	10	-	2	1	1	-	-	17
Echternach (Council)	3	3	2	3	-	-	-	0	11
Esch-sur-Alzette (Council)	4	9	1	2	0	2	1	0	19
Ettelbruck (Council)	5	4	2	2	-	-	-	-	13
Frisange (Council)	4	2	-	-	-	-	-	5	11
Grevenmacher (Council)	4	2	3	2	-	-	-	-	11
Hesperange (Council)	7	1	4	3	-	0	-	-	15
Junglinster (Council)	4	3	4	2	-	-	-	-	13
Käerjeng–Bascharage	4	5	1	2	0	-	-	-	12
Käerjeng–Clemency	1	2	0	0	-	-	-	2	5
Kayl (Council)	3	6	2	2	-	-	-	-	13
Kehlen (Council)	4	5	1	1	-	-	-	-	11
Kopstal (Council)	3	-	3	2	-	-	-	3	11
Lorentzweiler (Council)	3	-	-	2	-	-	-	6	11
Luxembourg (Council)	5	4	10	5	1	2	0	-	27
Mamer (Council)	6	3	1	3	-	-	-	-	13
Mersch (Council)	3	1	5	4	-	-	-	-	13
Mertert (Council)	4	5	2	-	-	-	-	-	11
Mondercange (Council)	3	7	2	1	0	-	-	-	13
Mondorf-les-Bains (Council)	4	1	5	1	-	-	-	-	11
Niederanven (Council)	5	3	2	1	-	-	-	-	11
Pétange (Council)	8	5	1	2	1	-	-	-	17
Rambrouch (Council)	4	2	1	-	-	-	-	4	11
Roeser (Council)	2	5	2	2	-	-	-	-	11
Rumelange (Council)	3	7	-	-	-	-	1	-	11
Sandweiler (Sandweiler)	5	2	2	2	-	-	-	-	11
Sanem (Council)	3	7	1	3	0	1	0	-	15
Remich (Council)	4	1	2	4	-	-	-	-	11
Schifflange (Council)	4	6	1	2	0	-	-	-	13
Schuttrange (Council)	1	3	4	-	-	-	-	3	11
Steinfort (Council)	5	5	1	-	-	-	-	-	11
Steinsel (Council)	2	5	3	1	-	-	-	-	11
Strassen (Council)	3	3	5	2	-	-	-	-	13
Walferdange (Council)	3	3	5	2	-	-	-	-	13
Wiltz (Council)	3	6	2	-	-	-	-	-	11
Wincrange (Council)	5	3	2	-	1	-	-	-	11
Councillors	160	160	104	72	4	7	3	23	533
Change	+11	+3	+5	+31	−1	+6	+3	+11	+69
Source: Ministry of the Interior
