= Citizens' List (Luxembourg) =

Luxembourgian political party

- Leader: Aly Jaerling (South); Jean Ersfeld (North)
- Founded: 2009
- Ideology: Big tent Euroscepticism

The Citizens' List (Luxembourgish: Biergerlëscht, French: Liste des citoyens) is a Luxembourgian political party. It was founded in the run-up to the 2009 Chamber of Deputies election and European election. It ran in two circonscriptions; in Sud, the list was to be headed by Aly Jaerling, then an independent member of the Chamber of Deputies, whilst, in Nord, it was led by Jean Ersfeld, formerly leader of the Free Party of Luxembourg.

The party stands for increased pension rights, following on from Jaerling's former membership of the (formerly single-issue) Alternative Democratic Reform Party; social justice; and an anti-establishment opposition to the major political parties.
