= Ana Correia da Veiga =

Cape Verdean-Luxembourgish politician (born 1983)

The Honourable Ana Correia da Veiga
- Official portrait, 2026

Member of the Chamber of Deputies
- Incumbent
- Assumed office 14 October 2026
- Preceded by: David Wagner
- Constituency: Centre

Member of the Luxembourg City Communal Council
- In office 28 September 2020 – 16 July 2023
- Preceded by: David Wagner
- Succeeded by: Nathalie Oberweis

Personal details
- Born: 11 January 1983 (age 43) Luxembourg City, Luxembourg
- Party: The Left
- Profession: Educator

Ana Correia da Veiga (born 11 January 1983) is a Cape Verdean-Luxembourgish politician. A member of the Left, she has served as a member of the Chamber of Deputies since 2026, and served on the Luxembourg City Communal Council from 2020 to 2023. She is the first black MP and first MP of Cape Verdean descent in Luxembourg.

Born to Cape Verdean immigrants and raised mostly in the Luxembourg City district of Bonnevoie, Correia da Veiga obtained her baccalauréat in Metz and a degree in special education in Liège, working as an educator until 2024. After joining the Left in 2013, she was a candidate in that year's general election in the North constituency, failing to be elected. She first attained elected office in 2020, replacing fellow party member David Wagner on the Luxembourg City Communal Council, a seat which she held until 2023. In that year's general election, she came second on the Left's list for the Centre constituency, where the party obtained one seat; however, per the Left's principle of rotating electoral mandates, she took up Wagner's seat in the Chamber of Deputies for the second half of the legislature, being sworn in in October 2026.

== Early life and education ==
Correia da Veiga was born on 11 January 1983 in Luxembourg City to construction worker Tomaz and cleaner Francisca Correia da Veiga, Cape Verdean immigrants who came to Luxembourg in the 1970s. She mostly grew up in the district of Bonnevoie as the eldest of four siblings, in a "conservative Catholic environment", with Cape Verdean Creole as her native language.

She attended the École privée Fieldgen, a private Catholic school that was all-female at the time. As a teenager, she came across the Maya Angelou novel I Know Why the Caged Bird Sings, which she has credited with "open[ing] a door for [her]", and helping her embrace her identity and understand her position as a black woman in a mostly white society.

After obtaining her baccalauréat in Metz, Correia da Veiga completed a part-time degree in special education in Liège. In 2004, she became active in the Comité Spencer, a youth violence prevention group formed after the death of 19-year old Cape Verdean Luxembourger Spencer Dos Santos Lima in a brawl in the Gare district in 2002. She worked as an educator in Differdange from 2002 to 2015, and as a social worker and educator specialising in childcare at the Service national de la jeunesse from 2017 to 2024.

Correia da Veiga joined the Left in 2013. She was employed by the party's parliamentary fraction from 2024 to 2026, working as a parliamentary assistant.

== Political career ==
=== Luxembourg City Communal Council ===
In the 2017 communal elections, Correia da Veiga was one of the candidates on the Left's electoral list in Luxembourg City. She came fourth on the list with 2,134 votes, with the party obtaining 6.79% of votes in the city and two seats on its communal council. As the Left's statutes impose a 'rotation principle' by which its elected officials must give up their seats mid-term in favour of the next elected candidates, she replaced Left councillor David Wagner after three years, being sworn in on 28 September 2020. She became the city's first councillor of Cape Verdean origin.

In May 2021, following a decision by DP mayor Lydie Polfer to sign a convention with a private security company that would patrol the Ville Haute, Gare and Bonnevoie districts, Correia da Veiga and fellow Left councillor Guy Foetz lodges appeals with the Luxembourg administrative tribunal against Polfer and interior minister Taina Bofferding. Foetz argued that surveillance of the public space could legally only be the responsibility of the Grand Ducal Police, and asked the city's college of aldermen to "respect the limits of rule of law". Correia da Veiga added that the money allocated for the private security company could be better spent on reinforcing existing mediation programs.

The 2023 communal elections saw the Left's vote share in Luxembourg City decrease, with the party losing one of its two seats. Correia da Veiga, who came third on its list with 3,119 votes, failed to be reelected.

=== Chamber of Deputies ===
Correia da Veiga first ran for the Chamber of Deputies in the snap 2013 general election, in the North constituency. She came second out of nine on the Left list with 1,016 votes, as the party failed to gain a seat in the North. She ran again in the 2018 general election, as one of the party's four lead candidates in the Centre; she came third out of 21 with 4,032 votes, with David Wagner elected as the constituency's sole Left MP.

In 2023, Correia da Veiga was once again of the Left's co-lead candidates in the Centre, alongside Wagner. She came second on the list with 4,360, and while the party once again only obtained one seat in the Centre, it assured she would eventually enter the Chamber due to the Left's rotation principle.

Correia da Veiga was sworn in to the Chamber of Deputies on 14 October 2026, replacing Wagner. She became the first black MP and first MP of Cape Verdean descent in Luxembourg. Upon taking her oath, she briefly raised a clenched a fist, later explaining it as "a gesture that brings together various struggles of the left and also represents victory and liberation", saying "I wanted to mark that moment because it’s historic. I felt like doing it and I also allowed myself that liberty." (Note: Portuguese: Um gesto que reúne várias lutas da esquerda e representa também a vitória e a libertação (...) Queria assinalar esse momento, porque é histórico. Apeteceu-me fazê-lo e dei-me também essa liberdade.) In her maiden speech, during which she briefly spoke in Cape Verdean Creole, she emphasised the significance of her entry into parliament, saying “Today, like others before me, I open a door - a symbolic door - for thousands of Black girls and women who are watching us". (Note: Luxembourgish: Haut, wéi anerer viru mir, maachen ech eng Dier op - eng symbolesch Dier - fir Dausenden vu schwaarze Mädercher a Fraen dobaussen, déi eis haut nokucken.) In a Facebook post, José Maria Neves, the President of Cape Verde, congratuled her on her swearing-in, saying "This is how the Cape Verdean diaspora must assert itself: through civic engagement and active participation in their host society, gaining a voice, representation and empowerment." (Note: Portuguese: É assim que a diáspora cabo-verdiana deve afirmar-se: através do engajamento cívico e da participação ativa na sociedade de acolhimento, conquistando voz, representação e empoderamento.)

== Personal life ==
Correia da Veiga is unmarried and lives in Bonnevoie. Besides her native Cape Verdean Creole, she speaks Luxembourgish, French, German and English. She holds both Cape Verdean and Luxembourgish nationalities.
