= Werner-Cravatte Government =

Coalition government of Luxembourg from 1964 to 1969

- Cabinet of Luxembourg
- 1964-1969
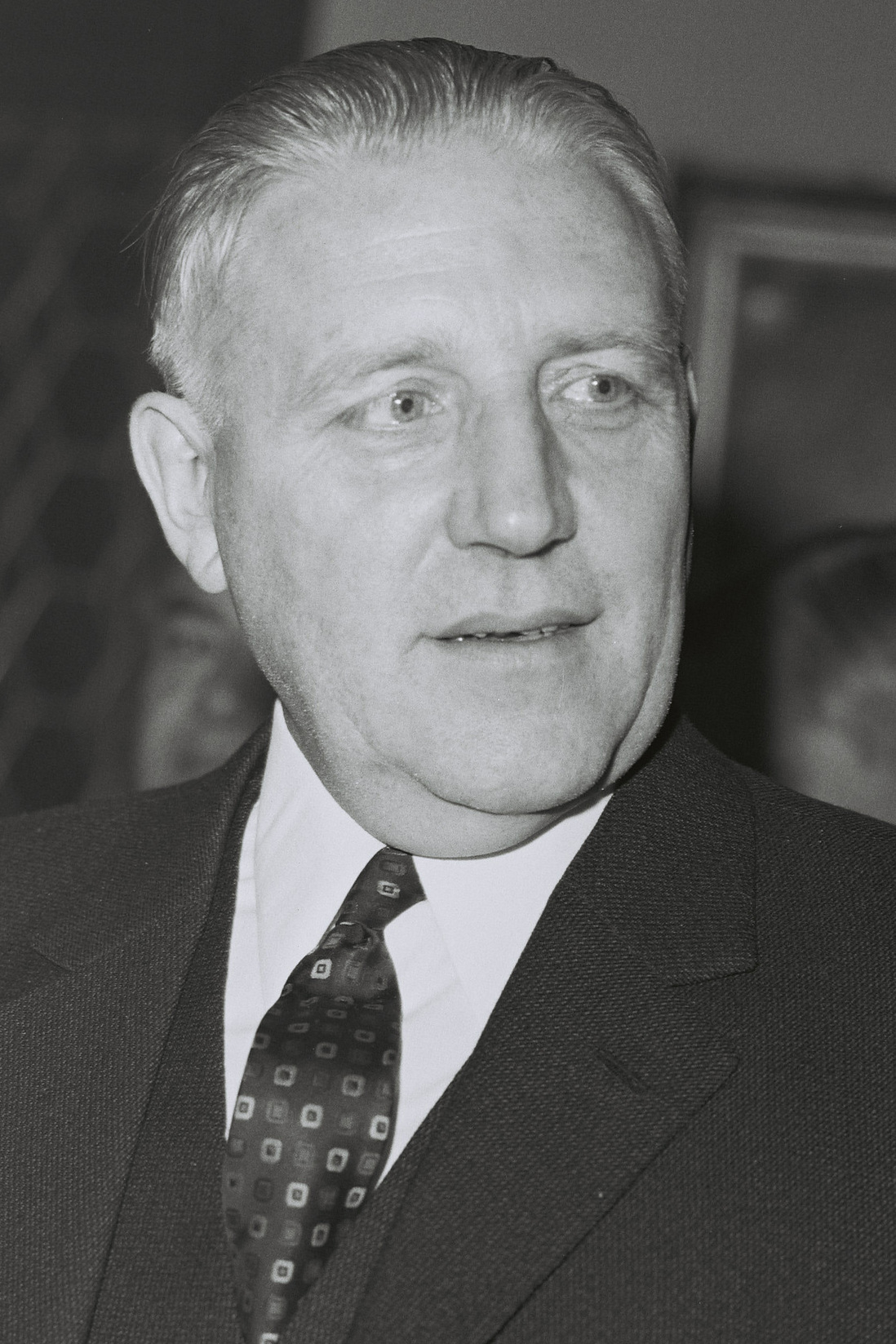
- Date formed: 15 July 1964
- Date dissolved: 1 February 1969 (4 years, 6 months, 2 weeks and 3 days)

People and organisations
- Monarch: Charlotte (1964); Jean (1964-1969)
- Prime Minister: Pierre Werner
- Deputy Prime Minister: Henry Cravatte
- Total no. of members: 10
- Member parties: CSV; LSAP
- Status in legislature: Centre-left to centre-right coalition government
- Opposition parties: KPL; DP; MIP

History
- Election: 1964 general election
- Legislature term: 23rd Legislature of the Chamber of Deputies
- Predecessor: Werner-Schaus I Government
- Successor: Werner-Schaus II Government

The Werner-Cravatte Government was the government of Luxembourg between 15 July 1964 and 1 February 1969. It was a coalition between the Christian Social People's Party (CSV), and the Luxembourg Socialist Workers' Party (LSAP). The Prime Minister was Pierre Werner, and the Deputy Prime Minister was Henry Cravatte, replacing Eugène Schaus, who had been Deputy Prime Minister in the first Werner-Schaus Government.

It was formed after the general election of 1964, which returned the CSV and LSAP as the largest and second-largest parties respectively in the legislature. (The LSAP had actually received more votes than the CSV, but one seat fewer.)

== Ministers ==
=== 15 July 1964 – 3 January 1967 ===
| Name | Party | Office |
|---|---|---|
| Pierre Werner | CSV | Prime Minister; Minister for Foreign Affairs; Minister for the Treasury; Minister for Justice |
| Henry Cravatte | LSAP | Deputy Prime Minister; Minister for the Interior; Minister for Tourism, Physical Education, and Sport |
| Émile Colling | CSV | Minister for Agriculture and Viticulture; Minister for the Family, Population, and Social Solidarity |
| Nicolas Biever | LSAP | Minister for Work, Social Security, and Mines; Minister for Public Health |
| Pierre Grégoire | CSV | Minister for National Education and Cultural Affairs; Minister for the Civil Service |
| Albert Bousser | LSAP | Minister for Public Works; Minister for Transport, Post, and Telecommunications |
| Antoine Wehenkel | LSAP | Minister for the Budget; Minister for the National Economy and Energy |
| Marcel Fischbach | CSV | Minister for the Middle Class; Minister for the Armed Forces; Assistant Minister for Foreign Affairs |
| Jean-Pierre Büchler | CSV | Secretary of State for Agriculture and Viticulture |
| Raymond Vouel | LSAP | Secretary of State for Public Health, Work, Social Security, and Mines |

=== 3 January 1967 – 1 February 1969 ===
| Name | Party | Office |
|---|---|---|
| Pierre Werner | CSV | Prime Minister; Minister for the Treasury and the Civil Service |
| Henry Cravatte | LSAP | Deputy Prime Minister; Minister for the Interior; Minister for Tourism, Physical Education, and Sport |
| Pierre Grégoire | CSV | Minister for Foreign Affairs, the Armed Forces, Cultural Affairs, and Religion |
| Albert Bousser | LSAP | Minister for Public Works; Minister for Transport, Post, and Telecommunications |
| Antoine Wehenkel | LSAP | Minister for the Budget; Minister for the National Economy and Energy |
| Antoine Krier | LSAP | Minister for Work, Social Security, and Mines; Minister for Public Health |
| Jean-Pierre Büchler | CSV | Minister for Agriculture, Viticulture, and the Middle Class |
| Jean Dupong | CSV | Minister for Justice, National Education, the Family, Young People, Population, and Social Solidarity |
| Raymond Vouel | LSAP | Secretary of State for Public Health, Work, Social Security, and Mines |
| Madeleine Frieden-Kinnen | CSV | Secretary of State for the Family, Young People, Population, Public Health, and National Education |

== Formation ==
In the elections of 7 June 1964, for the first time in history, the LSAP received more votes than the CSV. However, the CSV received one seat more than them (22 seats versus 21) due to the workings of the electoral system. The liberal Democratic Party suffered a painful defeat, likely due to the Army controversy. They received only 6 Deputies in the Chamber, while the Communists received 5. A new political group which represented the interests of those forcibly conscripted into the Wehrmacht during the war, the Popular Independent Movement (Mouvement indépendant populaire), received 2 seats. After long negotiations, the CSV and LSAP formed a grand coalition. The near-equal size of the two parties in the Chamber caused tensions within the coalition on several occasions.

=== Reshuffles ===
A first change took place after the death of Nicolas Biever, who was replaced by Antoine Krier. In late 1966, the parliamentary intervention of the young CSV Deputy Jean Spautz demanding the abolition of conscription provoked a government crisis. Spautz's proposition had been made without informing the coalition partner, or his own party leadership. The Minister for the Armed Forces tendered his resignation, followed by the entire government. After ministerial reshuffles and negotiations, the coalition was renewed on 3 January 1967. For the first time in Luxembourg's political history, a woman joined the government, as Madeleine Frieden-Kinnen became Secretary of State for Family, Young People and Education.

== Foreign policy ==
=== European headquarters ===
The government's main concern in foreign policy was to defend Luxembourg's position as a European headquarters. Since 1958, three communities were working in parallel: the European Coal and Steel Community, the Common Market, and Euratom, each with their own executive body. In 1961, negotiations were started to merge the three executives. This unification brought the risk that the European institutions might leave Luxembourg, and be relocated to a single headquarters. Eugène Schaus, the Minister for Foreign Affairs in the previous government, had suggested that Luxembourg host the European Parliament, to compensate a possible loss of the High Authority and the Court of Justice. However, this proposition met with French opposition. After the general elections of June 1964, Pierre Werner, the new Foreign Minister, participated in the negotiations which resulted on 8 April 1965 in the signing of a treaty establishing one Council and one Commission for the European Communities. On 2 March 1965, the Council of Ministers of the EEC published a document specifying that "Luxembourg, Brussels and Strasbourg remain the provisional working places of the institutions of the Communities". This agreement established that the Community's financial and judicial institutions would be located in Luxembourg. This led to a split headquarters. The secretariat of the European Parliament and the Court of Justice remained in Luxembourg. Sessions of the Council of Ministers were also held there periodically. The European Investment Bank and various other services such as the Court of Auditors, the Office of Statistics and the Office of Publications were established in Luxembourg.

=== Empty chair crisis ===
In 1966, the Luxembourgish government was called on to play an active role in the resolution of the empty chair crisis, which put the European Community to the test. From 30 June 1965, France stopped participating in the work of the Community following a disagreement over the financing of the Common Agricultural Policy. In January 1966, Pierre Werner chaired two sessions of the Council of Ministers, which were held in Luxembourg and in which France participated again after a seven-month absence. In the course of these meetings, termed the “reunion of Luxembourg”, a compromise took the Community out of its stalemate. The Luxembourgish representative had been able to shine in his role as an “honest broker”, whose good relations with all parties had facilitated the negotiations.

=== Financial centre ===
1968 was the first time that the Luxembourgish government had to defend a vital interest of the Grand Duchy, which was to be contested more than once by its partners in future: this was the financial centre. This had been developing since the early 1960s thanks to advantageous banking and tax laws. However, since their 1968 meetings, the finance ministers of the EEC were considering a plan to harmonise the taxation of movements of capital. This proposition met with vehement opposition from Pierre Werner. Conscious of the danger that the levelling of tax conditions posed to the fledgling financial centre, the Minister of Finances proposed instead to give priority to monetary harmonisation. As it happened, the difficulties of the pound sterling and the French franc would turn the attention of European finance ministers away from the Luxembourgish financial centre, and put monetary questions on the back-burner.

== Economic policy ==
=== Banking ===
The Werner-Cravatte years were important from an economic point of view as they saw the flourishing of the Luxembourgish financial centre. However, the birth of what would become the main pillar of the Grand Duchy's economy was not due to government policy. Its origins lay in a measure of the United States government to slow the emission of international loans on the financial markets of New York, the Interest Equalization Tax. The reorientation of capital flows which resulted from this led to the creation of the international Eurodollars market. However, Luxembourg, which did not have a central bank, and where banking and tax laws were very flexible, found itself in a favourable position, while the traditional financial centres such as London, Zurich or Amsterdam were burdened by restrictive regulation. The Grand Duchy's capital gradually became one of the main centres for the Euro-markets, and foreign banks started establishing themselves in Luxembourg. The number of banking institutions grew from 15 in 1960 to 37 in 1970. In this boom phase, the government of the day had little involvement, even though it did on occasion defend the financial centre against European plans for fiscal harmonisation. The financial centre profited from both positive external factors, as well as legislation from 40 years previous, prepared under the then-Minister for Finances Pierre Dupong.

=== Economic and Social Council ===
From 1966, the government set up a new consultative organ for economic and social policy. The law of 21 March 1966 created the Economic and Social Council. This organ, which included representatives of employers' organisations, the trade unions, and the government, was tasked with preparing reports on the country's economic situation, reports which helped to elaborate national economic policy.

=== Infrastructure ===
When it came to infrastructure, the government prioritised the development of the road network. While the roads had barely changed since 1927, road traffic had increased dramatically. Thus, the number of vehicles registered in the Grand Duchy grew from 14,000 in 1940 to more than 80,000 in 1964. Similarly, the transit of goods and people increased year by year. It was vital to adapt the road network to the dimensions of the economy and traffic. From August 1964, the Minister for Public Works, Albert Bousser, put in place a commission to examine propositions to improve the national road network. Its work resulted in a law enacted on 16 August 1967, which provided for the construction of around 150 km of major roads over 10 years, and the creation of a Roads Fund intended to guarantee the continuity of the works over several years rather than have the expenditure be part of the annual budget. The project ended up taking a long time, as the final connection to the international motorway network was not finished until the 1990s.

== Agricultural policy ==
The big challenge for agricultural policy in the 1960s was to progressively integrate Luxembourgish farming into the Common Market. At the signing of the Treaty of Rome, Luxembourg had succeeded in obtaining an additional protocol which allowed it to maintain protection measures for a transition period of 12 years. However, the Luxembourgish government was obliged to enact structural, technical and economic reforms in order to allow full integration by the end of this grace period. Apart from mediocre natural conditions, the main weaknesses of Luxembourgish farming were the fragmentation of the land and the predominance of small-scale farmers. Government policy aimed to adapt agriculture to the conditions of the modern economy and to create businesses that were economically viable. In 1964, the Werner-Schaus government had a law passed to consolidate land in order to counter-act the parcelling up. In April 1965, the Werner-Cravatte government submitted a law of agricultural development to the Chamber which aimed to restructure Luxembourgish farming and create a development fund. In 1969, the law on inheritance introduced a significant reform as it introduced the principles of rapport and of the best-qualified successor. Formerly, the application of the general rule of the Code civil had led to an excessive fragmentation and to the indebtedness of the farms' owners, who had to compensate the other inheritors.

== Social policy ==
The law of 12 June 1965 on collective contracts complemented the legislation on employer-worker relations in Luxembourg. It included the obligation to negotiate. A business owner could not refuse to start negotiations towards a collective contract if qualified representatives of the employees demanded it. The law of 1965 also included a “sliding-scale” clause providing for the automatic adaptation of pay to changes in the cost of living, which had to be included in every collective contract.

The government also took a measure against discrimination of women in the workplace. The law of 17 May 1967 adopted an agreement of the International Labour Organization, which concerned equality of pay between male and female workers for equal work.

== Domestic policy ==
=== Army reform ===
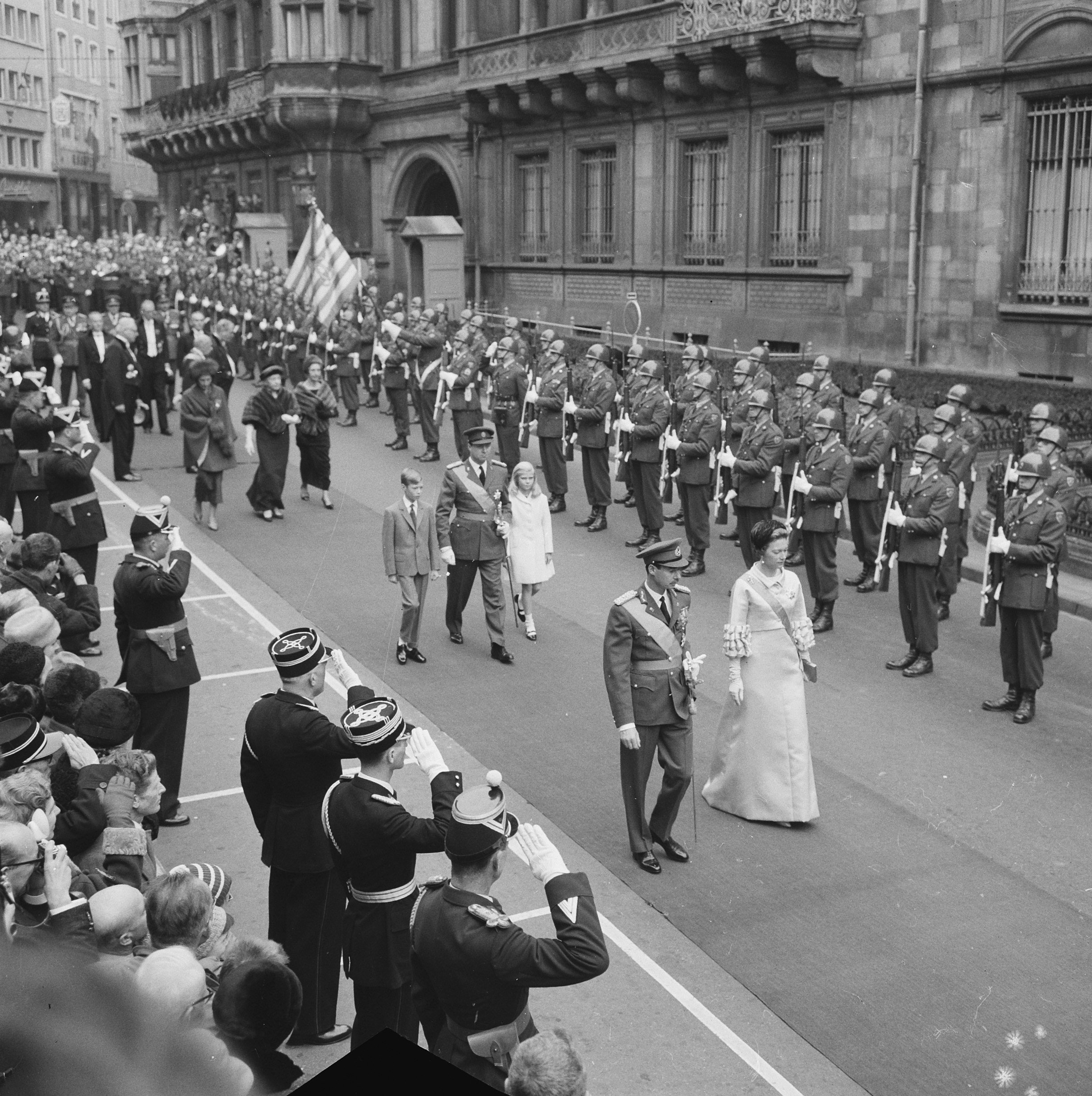
Luxembourg Army soldiers at Grand Duke Jean's ascension to the throne, 1964

The issue of the military was a recurring theme for domestic politics throughout the 1960s. Opposition to compulsory military service continued to grow, in a country had no military tradition. Conscription also contributed to the Luxembourgish economy's state of over-employment, which made it necessary to resort to foreign labour. Various incidents among the officer corps, such as the Winter Affair, reinforced the public's negative attitude towards the army. In 1965, compulsory military service was reduced to six months. However, this length of time did not allow for adequate training time, which made the military appear more and more useless. At the Chamber of Deputies' session of 15 November, the Deputy Jean Spautz acted as the spokesman of the young militants of the CSV, who were increasingly unhappy that the military controversy was affecting their party, and demanded the abolition of conscription. This initiative, which took the socialist coalition partners by surprise, as well as the leaders of the CSV, caused a government crisis. At the end of this, the government took steps to abolish conscription. An agreement was reached with NATO's authorities: Luxembourg would maintain a volunteer army, and put two infantry companies at NATO's disposal as part of a multinational force. In addition, the government advanced Luxembourg's candidacy to host NAMSA.

=== Education reform ===
In parallel to the question of the army, the debate on school reform was at the forefront of the domestic scene. Economic and social changes made teaching reform necessary. The government responded by extending the range of subjects taught, and by creating new types of schools. 1965 saw the introduction of "middle schools" (écoles moyennes). This measure was intended to orientate young people who were not suited to university studies, towards mid-level careers in administration and the private sector, and to free up the overfilled Lycées. May 1968 also provoked unrest in Luxembourg. The students of the “Cours supérieurs” went on strike and organised a protest to demand a reform of higher education and the "collation des grades". The Minister of Education introduced a bill, which was however not passed until the next government was in office. The Werner-Cravatte government also introduced changes in secondary education: it transformed the first year of secondary school into an orientation class for both classical and modern education, mixed education of boys and girls, an increase in subject options, the creation of a subject of “secular ethics” and a “none” option, i.e. the possibility of attending neither religion classes nor secular ethics classes.
