= Jean Bertrand =

Jean Bertrand may refer to:

- Jean de Bertrand (cardinal) (1482–1560), Roman Catholic prelate
- Jean Markale (1928–2008), French writer
- Jean-Bertrand Aristide (born 1953), Haitian former Catholic priest and politician
- Jean-Bertrand Féraud (1759–1795), French politician massacred during the French Revolution
- Jean-Jacques Bertrand (1916–1973), Premier of Quebec, Canada
- Jean-François Bertrand (born 1946), politician in Quebec, Canada
- Jean-Michel Bertrand (1943–2008), French politician
- Jean-Paul Bertrand-Demanes (born 1952), French football goalkeeper
- Jean-François-Bertrand Delmas (1751–1798), French Revolutionary politician
- Jean-Baptiste Bertrand (1823–1887), French painter and lithographer
- Jean-Claude Bertrand (born 1954), French badminton player
- Jhemp Bertrand (Jean-Pierre Bertrand, 1921–2008), politician and activist in Luxembourg
