= 2009 European Parliament election in Luxembourg =

← 2004	7 June 2009	2014 →

6 seats to the European Parliament
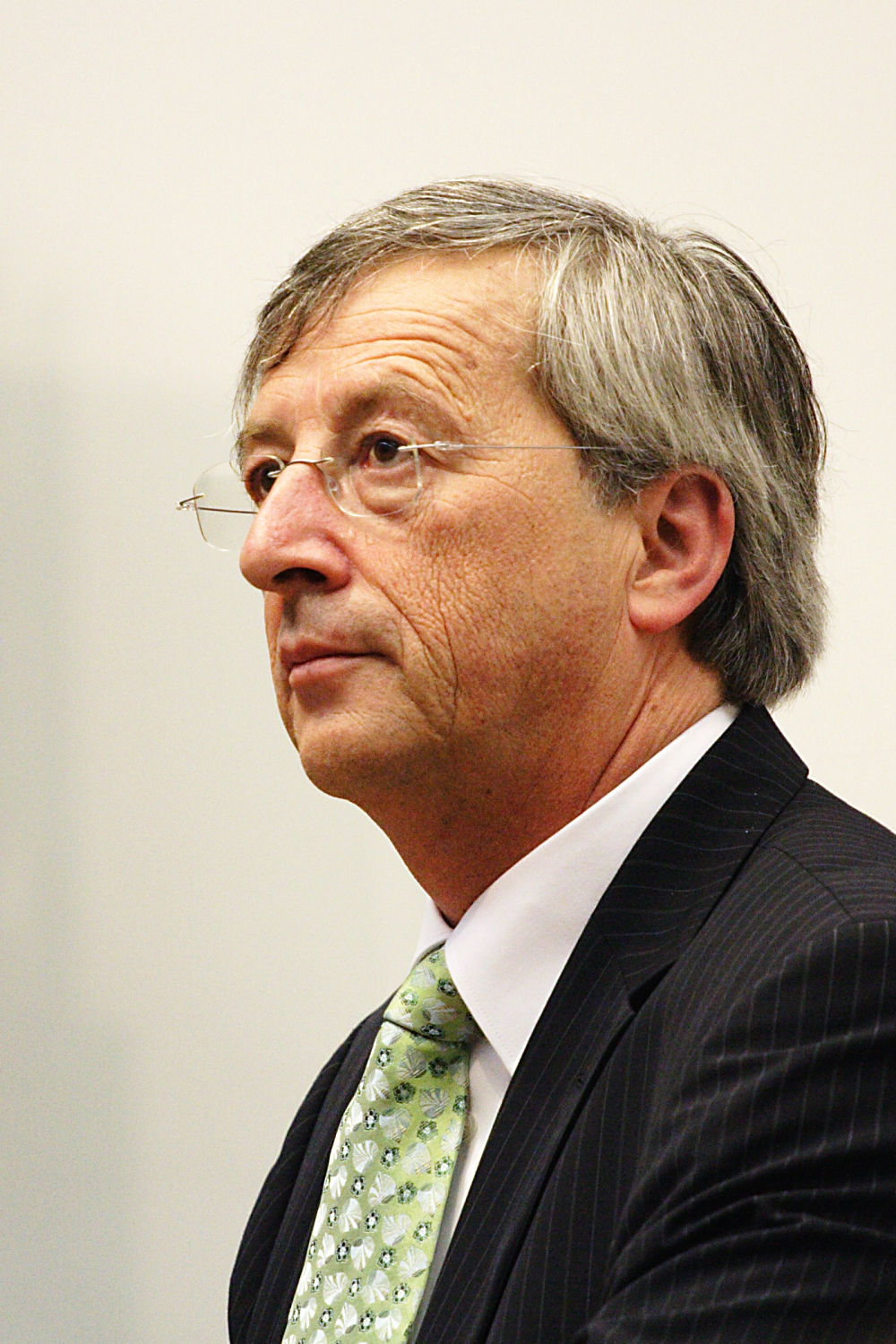

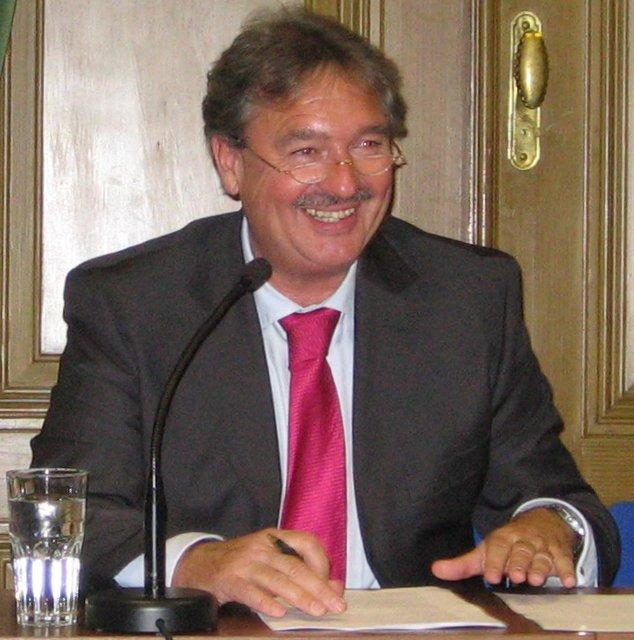
	First party	Second party
Leader	Jean-Claude Juncker	Jean Asselborn
Party	CSV	LSAP
Last election	3 seats, 37.1%	1 seat, 19.49%
Seats won	3	1
Seat change	Steady	Steady
Popular vote	353,094	219,349
Percentage	31.36%	19.48%
	Third party	Fourth party
Leader	Claude Meisch	Sam Tanson and Christian Kmiotek
Party	DP	Greens
Last election	1 seat, 14.9%	1 seat, 15%
Seats won	1	1
Seat change	Steady	Steady
Popular vote	210,107	189,523
Percentage	18.66%	16.83%

The 2009 European Parliament election in Luxembourg was the election of the delegation from Luxembourg to the European Parliament in 2009. It was held on the same day as the elections to the national legislature, the Chamber of Deputies.

== Parties ==
The election was contested by the same eight parties that contested the simultaneous election to the Chamber. These included the seven parties that ran in the 2004 election: Christian Social People's Party (CSV), Luxembourg Socialist Workers' Party (LSAP), the Greens, the Democratic Party (DP), the Alternative Democratic Reform Party (ADR), the Left, and the Communist Party (KPL). The addition for the 2009 election is the Citizens' List, which was led by current independent deputy Aly Jaerling.

List #	Party	European Party	Current seats
1	Communist Party (KPL)		0
2	Greens	European Green Party	1
3	Alternative Democratic Reform Party (ADR)	Alliance for Europe of the Nations	0
4	Luxembourg Socialist Workers' Party (LSAP)	Party of European Socialists	1
5	Democratic Party (DP)	Liberal Democrat and Reform Party	1
6	The Left	European Left	0
7	Christian Social People's Party (CSV)	European People's Party	3
8	Citizens' List		0

== Results ==
Party	Votes	%	Seats	+/–
Christian Social People's Party	353,094	31.36	3	0
Luxembourg Socialist Workers' Party	219,349	19.48	1	0
Democratic Party	210,107	18.66	1	0
The Greens	189,523	16.83	1	0
Alternative Democratic Reform Party	83,168	7.39	0	0
The Left	37,929	3.37	0	0
Communist Party of Luxembourg	17,304	1.54	0	0
Citizens' List	15,558	1.38	0	New
Total	1,126,032	100.00	6	0
Valid votes	198,364	90.82		
Invalid/blank votes	20,059	9.18		
Total votes	218,423	100.00		
Registered voters/turnout	240,669	90.76		
Source: Public.lu
