= Éislek =

Forested region of Luxembourg

Coordinates: 50°N 6°E

Éislek (Luxembourgish: [ˈɜɪ̯slek]), also known by its German name Ösling (pronounced [ˈøːslɪŋ]), or English Oesling, is a region covering the northern part of both the Grand Duchy of Luxembourg and Eifelkreis Bitburg-Prüm, within the greater Ardennes area that also covers parts of Belgium and France. Éislek covers 32% of the territory of Luxembourg; to the south of Éislek lies Gutland (literally "Good Land"), which covers the remaining 68% of the Grand Duchy as well as the southern part of the Eifelkreis Bitburg-Prüm.

== Features ==
The region is characterised by hills and large deciduous forests. Almost all of Luxembourg's tallest hills are in Éislek, particularly in the north and north-west, near the borders with Belgium and Germany. Its main hill chains are cut by scenic river valleys, most notable those of the Clerve, Our, upper Sauer, and Wiltz.

=== Towns and villages ===
Éislek is sparsely populated, with few larger towns; Clervaux, Vianden and Wiltz are the largest ones in the Luxembourgish part of Éislek, of which only Wiltz has a population of over 6,000 people. The area is known for its hill-side villages, which rely upon the visitors that the tourist season brings.

== History ==
In the late 18th century, a rural popular rising against the French Revolutionary forces was centered upon the Éislek area.

In World War II, the Battle of the Bulge was partly fought in the region in late 1944 and early 1945.

== Regionalist pressures ==
In the 2004 general election, the Free Party of Luxembourg, a small regionalist party based in Éislek and led by local personality Jean Ersfeld, offered candidates, but none were elected. The party had difficulty in continuing to organize after the election.

== Gallery ==
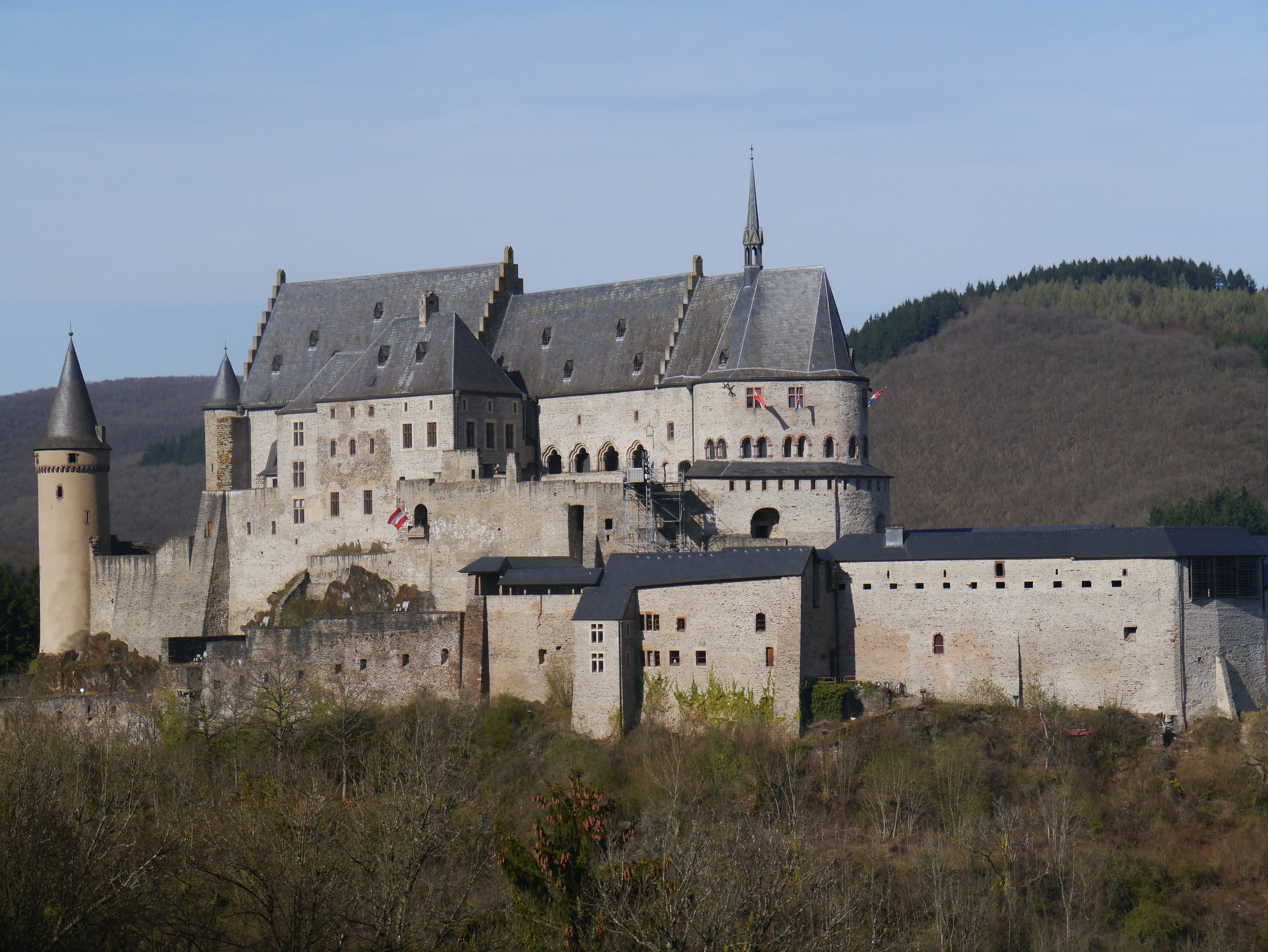
Vianden Castle

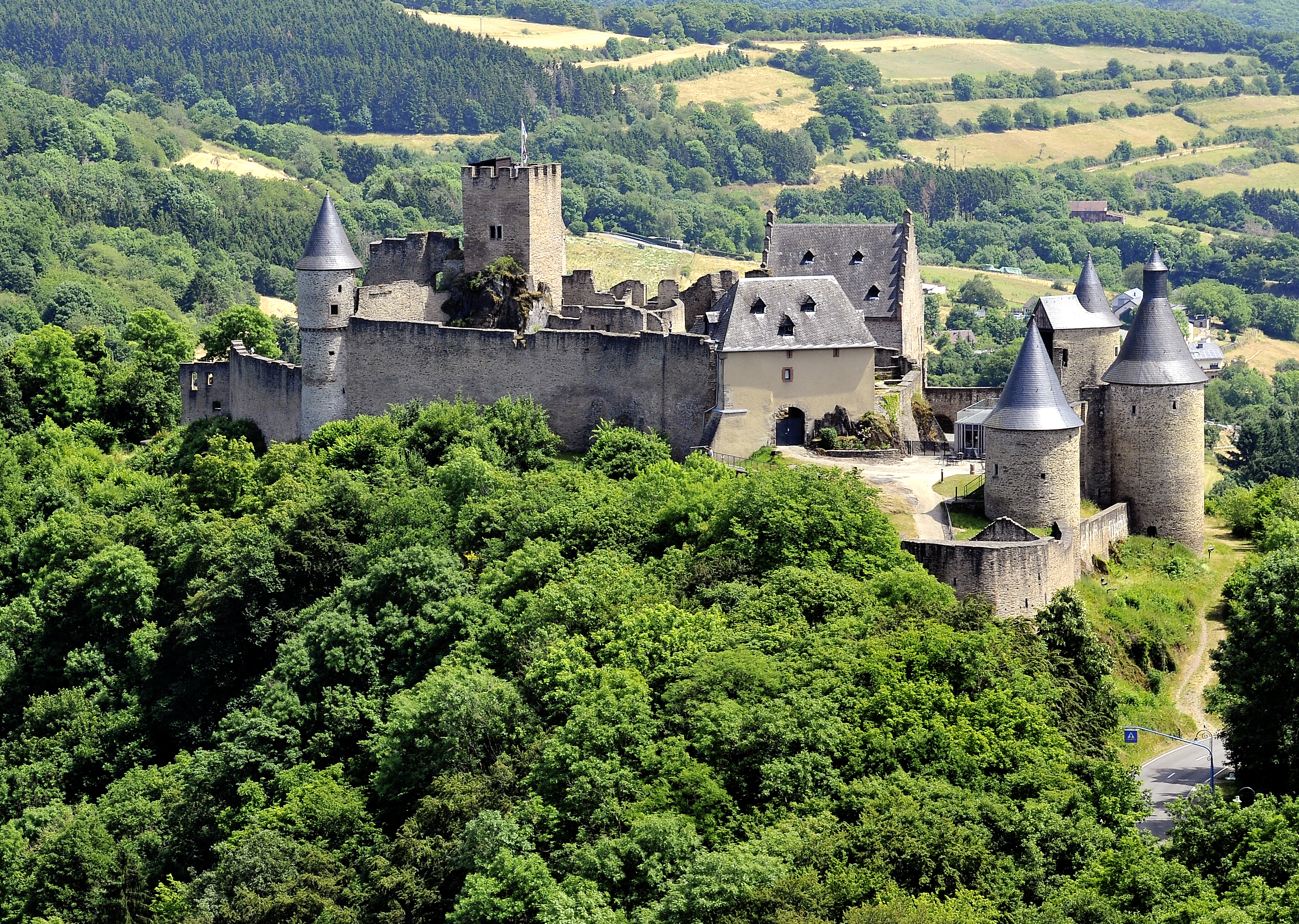
Bourscheid Castle

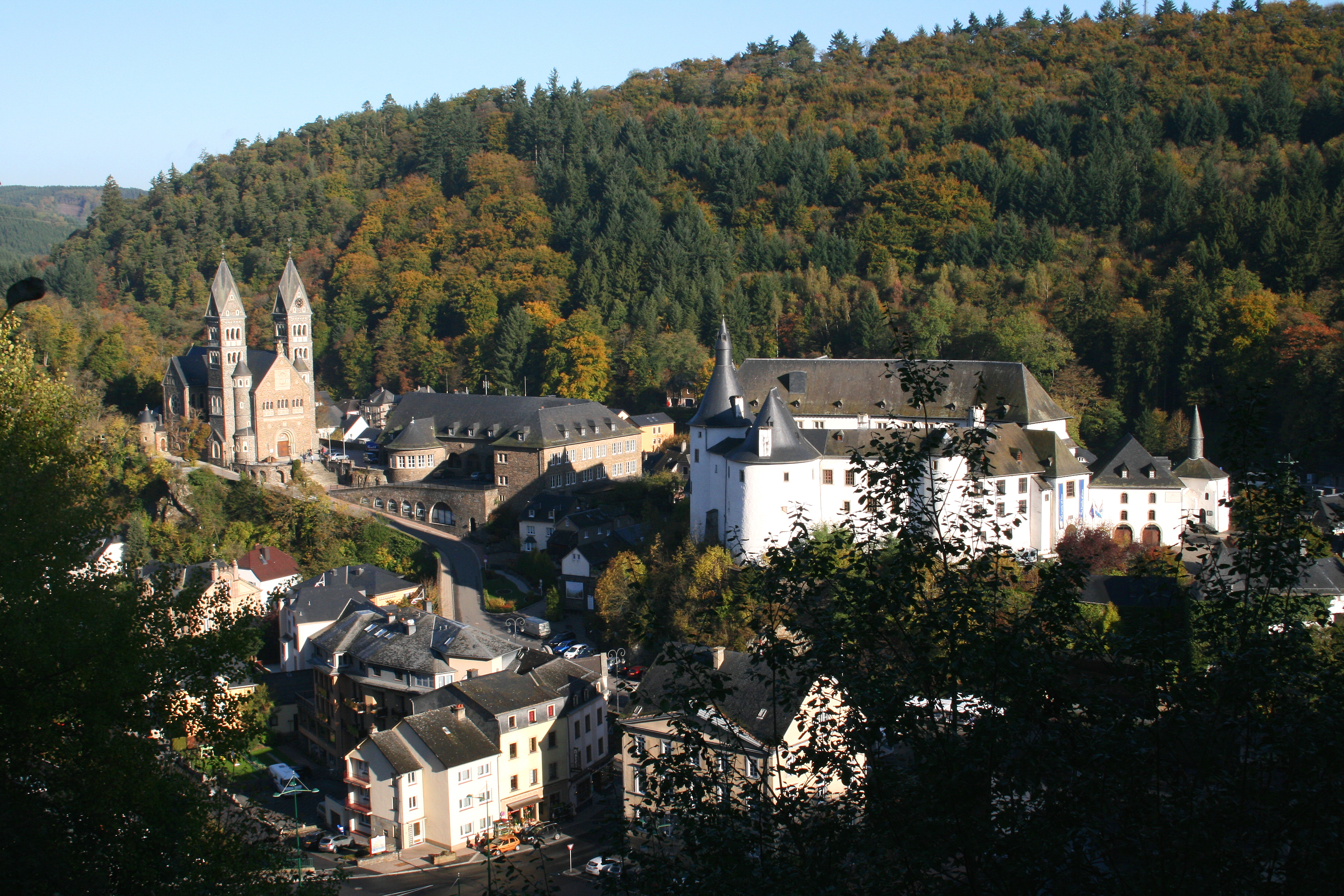
Clervaux

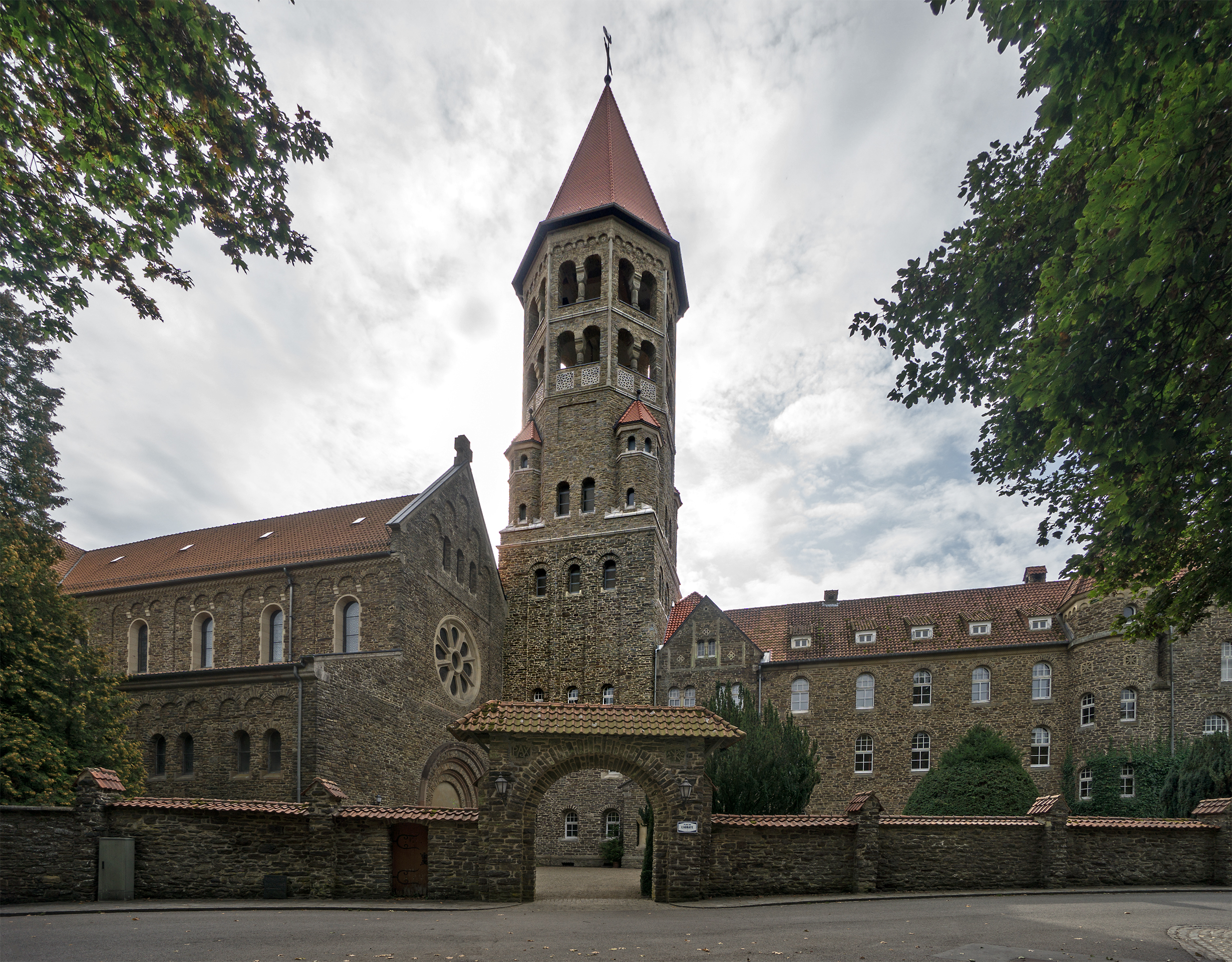
Clervaux Abbey

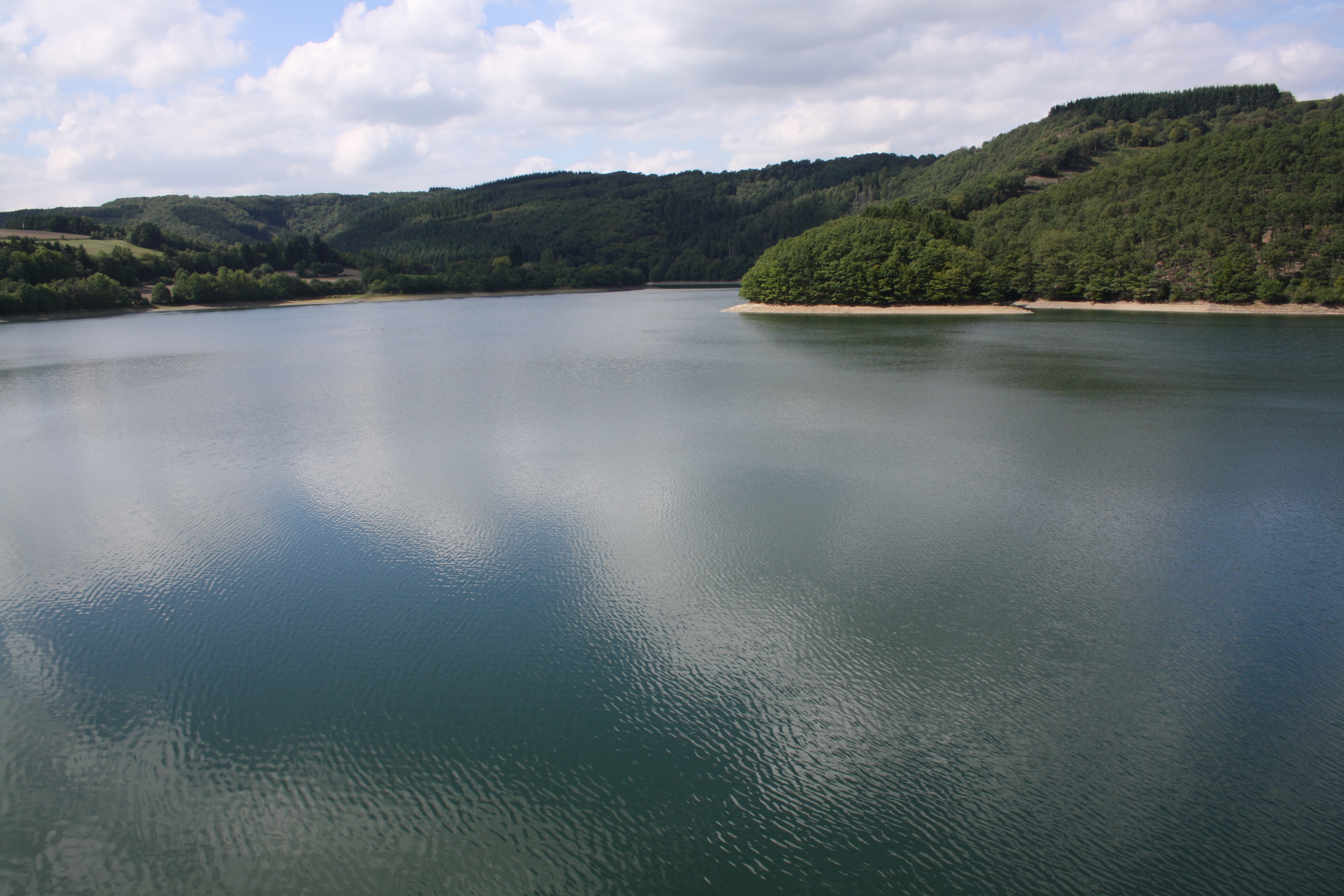
Upper Sûre Lake

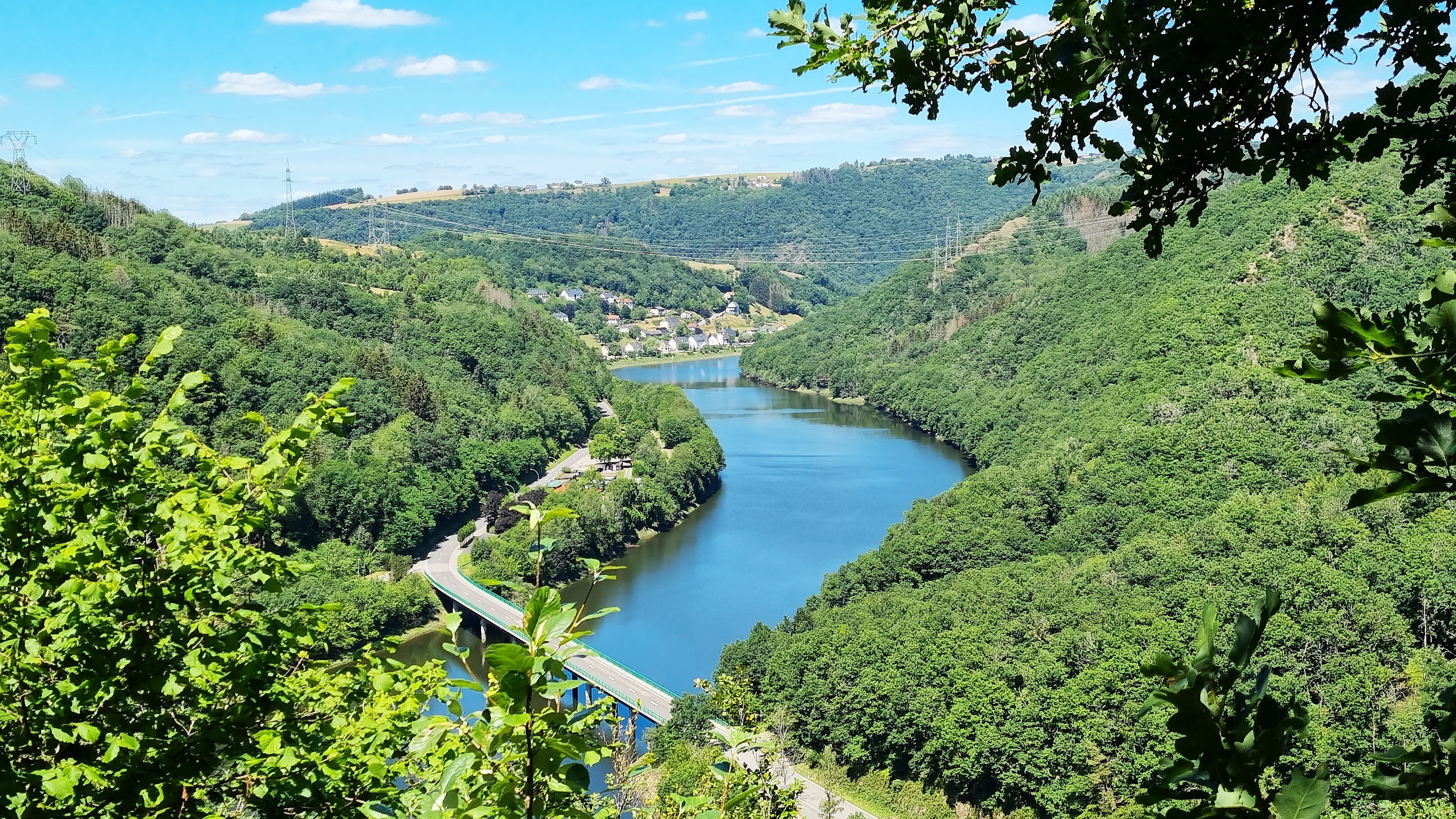
Our valley

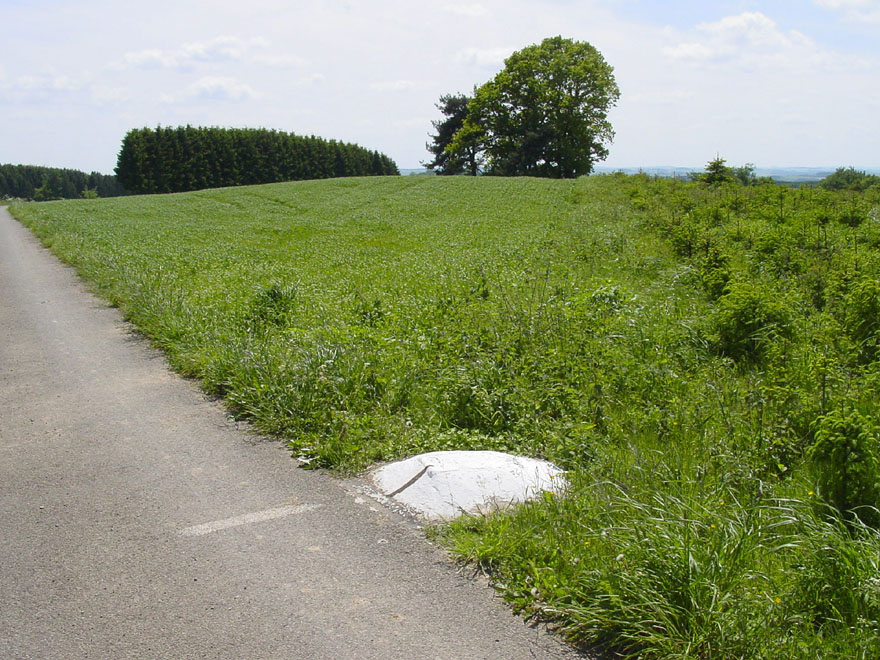
Kneiff

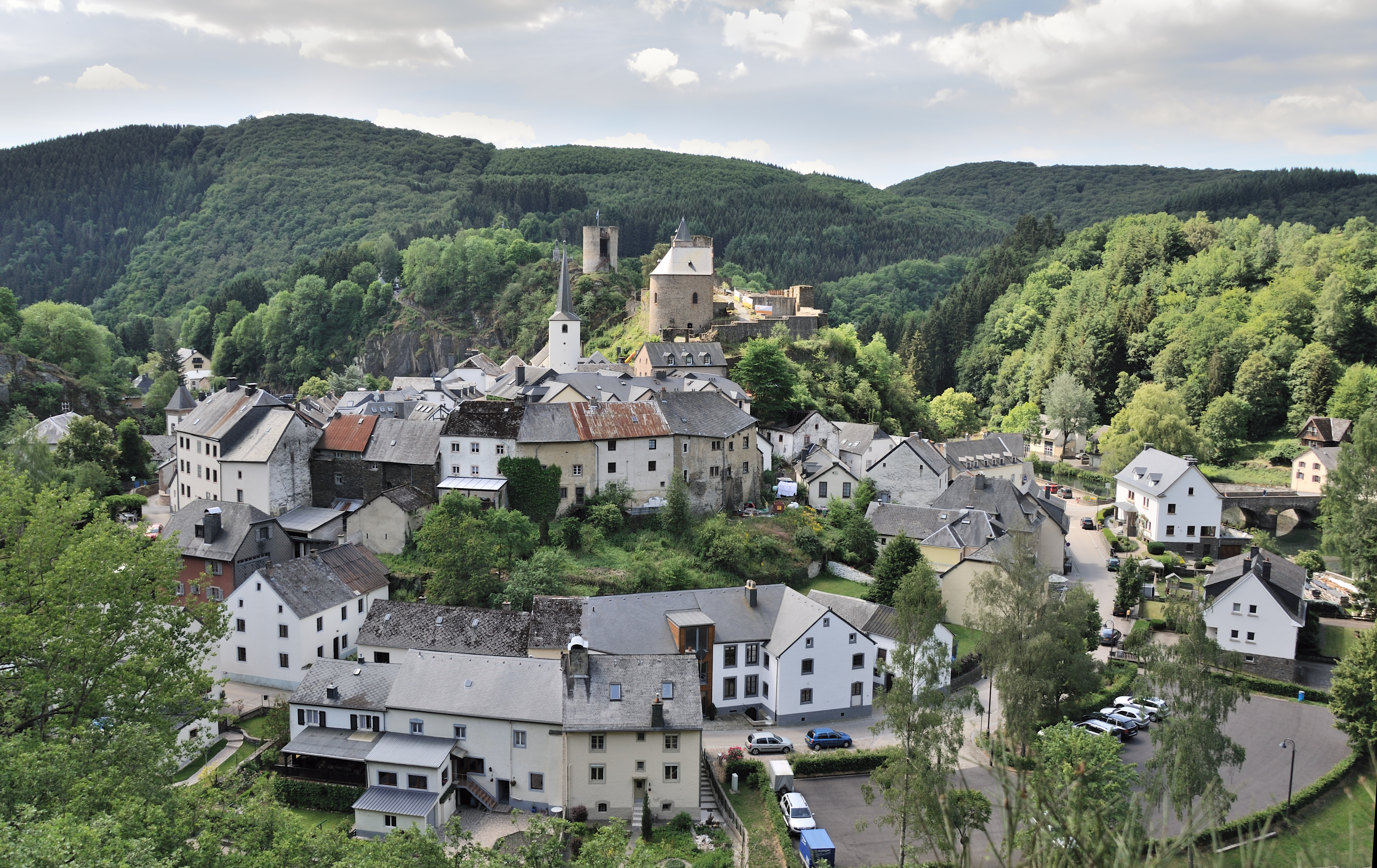
Esch-sur-Sûre

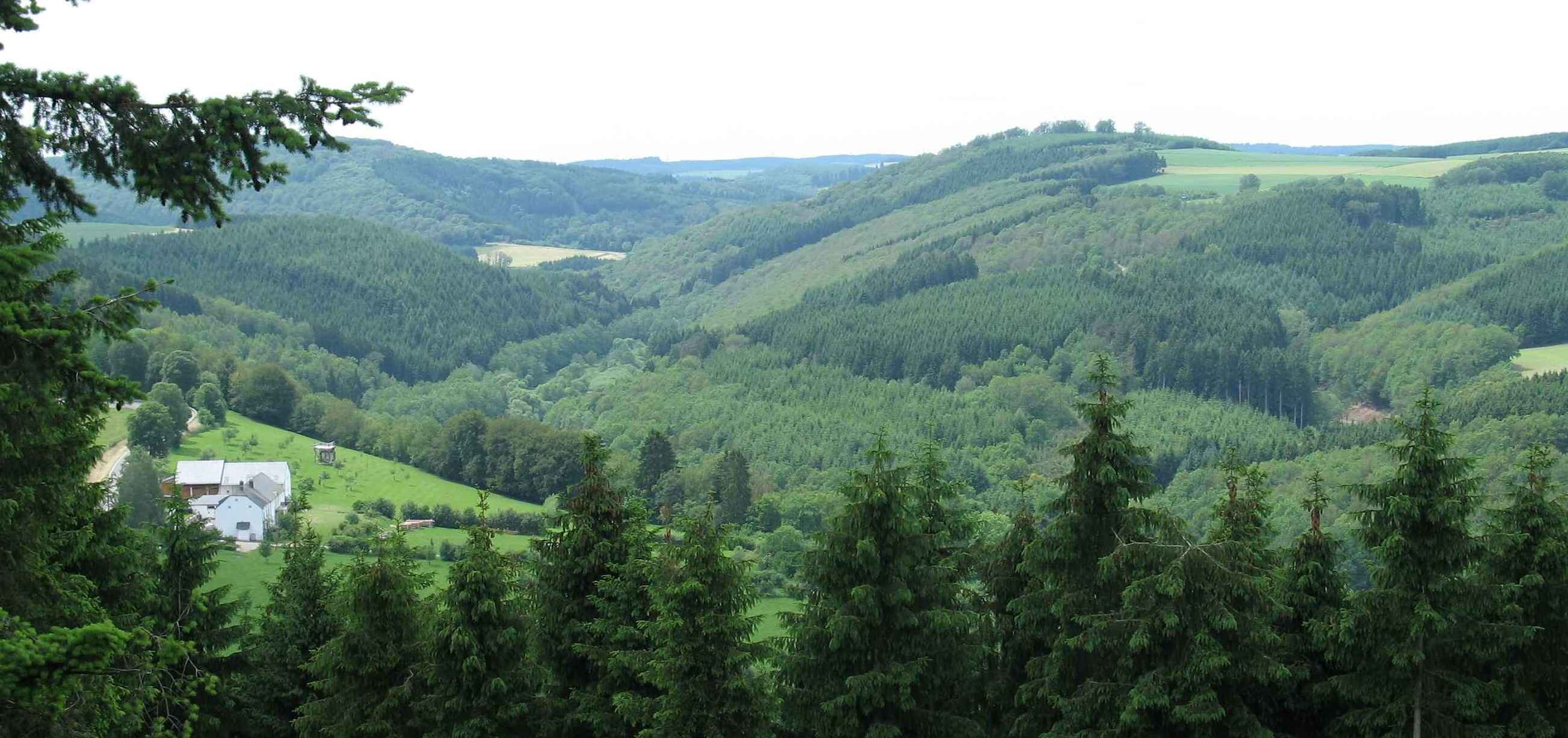
Landscape near Ferme Misère, Rambrouch

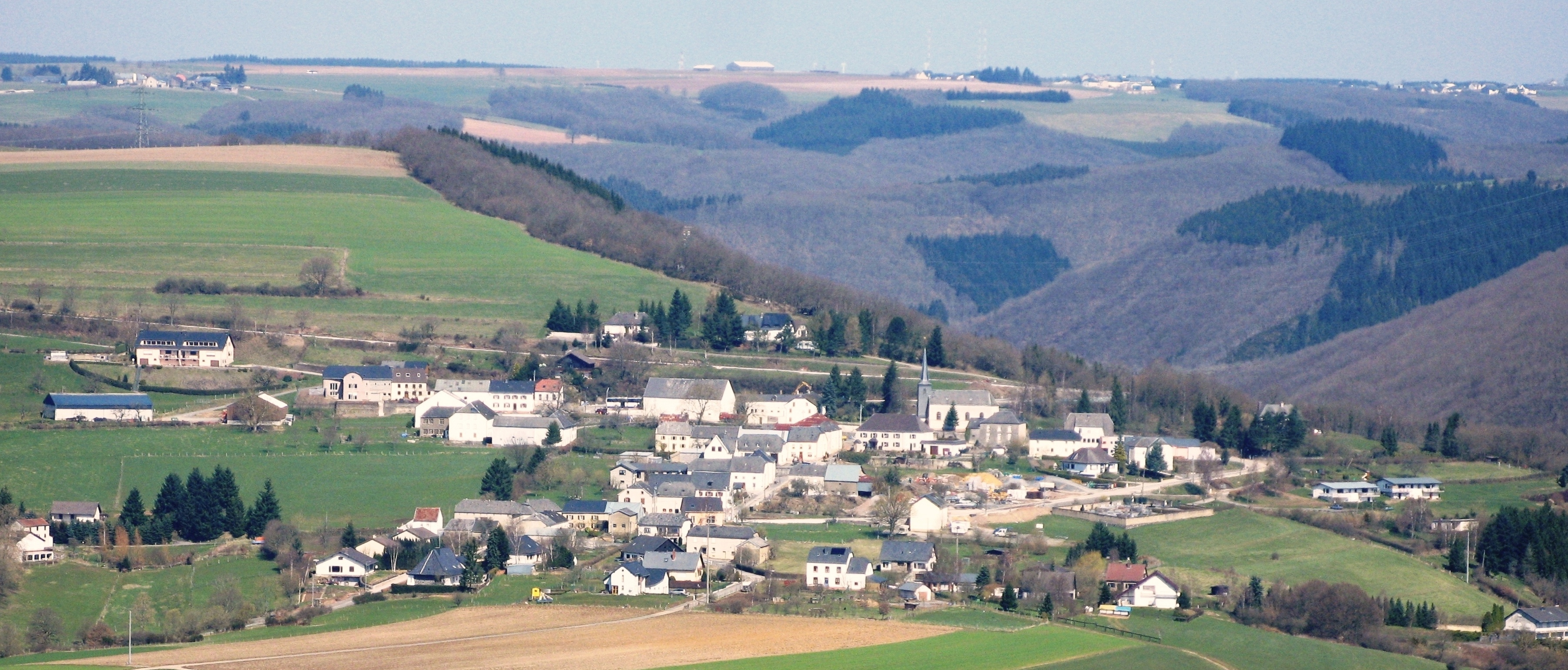
Schlindermanderscheid
