= Luxembourg City Communal Council =

Luxembourg Communal Council
- Coat of arms of Luxembourg City

Type
- Type: Unicameral

Leadership
- Mayor: Lydie Polfer (DP) since 17 December 2013

Structure
- Seats: 27
- Political groups: DP (10) CSV (6) Greens (5) LSAP (4) ADR (1) The Left (1)

Meeting place
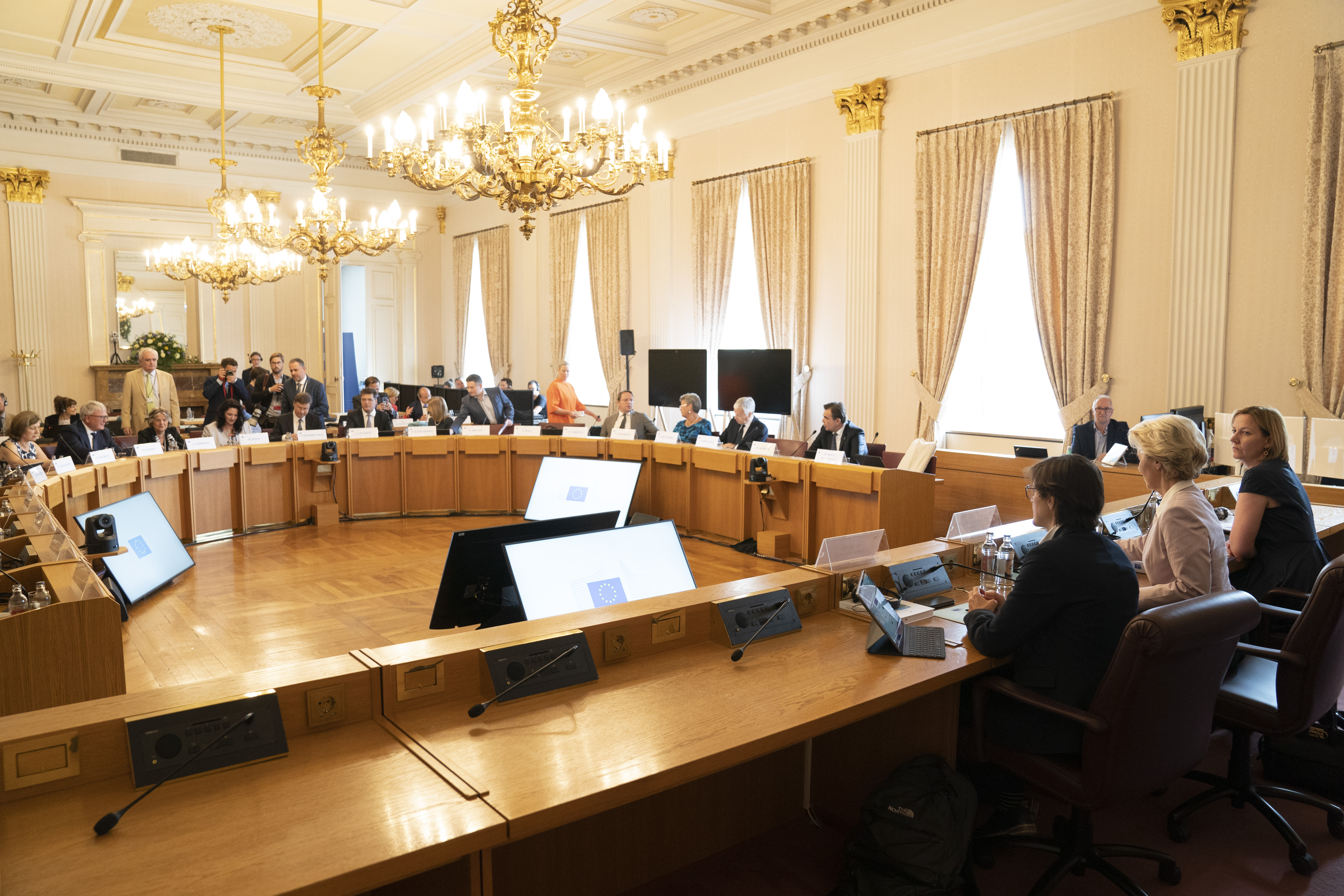
- Luxembourg City Hall, Luxembourg City

Luxembourg City Communal Council (French: Conseil communal de la Ville de Luxembourg, Luxembourgish: Gemengerot vun der Stad Lëtzebuerg) is the local council for the commune of Luxembourg City, in southern Luxembourg.

It consists of twenty-seven members, elected every six years by proportional representation.

== Current composition ==
Elections were held on 11 June 2023, in which the Democratic Party (DP), which has held the city's mayorship without interruption since 1969, retained a plurality of seats. In the collège échevinal, the DP decided to continue their existing coalition with the Christian Social People's Party, who had the second-largest contingent, under the leadership of DP mayor Lydie Polfer.

2023 election results
| Party | Popular vote | Seats | Change |
|---|---|---|---|
| Democratic Party (DP) | 31,38% | 10 | ▲1 |
| Christian Social People's Party (CSV) | 20,6% | 6 | ▼1 |
| The Greens | 18,53% | 5 | 0 |
| Luxembourg Socialist Workers' Party (LSAP) | 10,65% | 3 | 0 |
| The Left | 5,74% | 1 | ▼1 |
| Alternative Democratic Reform Party (ADR) | 4,95% | 1 | 0 |
| Pirate Party of Luxembourg | 4,82% | 1 | ▲1 |
| Total: | | 27 | |

List of incumbent members of the Luxembourg City Communal Council
| Name | Portrait | Party | Notes | Councillor since | Date of birth |
|---|---|---|---|---|---|
| Lydie Polfer | | DP | Mayor | 28 November 2005 | 22 November 1952 |
| Maurice Bauer | | CSV | First alderman | 1 October 2011 | 11 October 1971 |
| Simone Beissel | | DP | Alderwoman | 30 September 1991 | 27 April 1953 |
| Corinne Cahen | | DP | Alderwoman | 6 July 2023 | 16 May 1973 |
| Patrick Goldschmidt | | DP | Alderman | 19 October 2009 | 2 February 1970 |
| Paul Galles | | CSV | Alderman | 4 December 2017 | 18 May 1973 |
| Laurent Mosar | | CSV | Alderman | 27 January 1997 | 8 February 1958 |
| Anne Kaiffer | | DP | | 17 July 2023 | |
| Colette Mart | | DP | | 1 June 2023 | 27 April 1955 |
| Sylvia Camarda | | DP | | 4 April 2017 | 21 September 1978 |
| Robert L. Philippart | | DP | | 17 July 2023 | 2 April 1960 |
| Pascale Arend | | DP | | 2011 | 16 May 1973 |
| Claude Radoux | | DP | | 28 January 2008 | 27 August 1963 |
| Emilie Costantini | | CSV | | 2023 | 1 December 1979 |
| Angélique Bartolini | | CSV | | 4 December 2023 | 21 January 1979 |
| Bob Biver | | CSV | | 4 December 2023 | 17 December 1985 |
| François Benoy | | Gréng | | 9 December 2013 | 7 February 1985 |
| Liudumila Branca | | Gréng | | 29 September 2025 | 4 September 1979 |
| Nicolas Back | | Gréng | | 17 July 2023 | 8 November 1986 |
| Christa Brömmel | | Gréng | | 2017 | 15 October 1965 |
| Fabricio Costa | | Gréng | | 2 March 2026 | 30 January 1995 |
| Gabriel Boisante | | LSAP | | 27 January 2020 | 8 October 1977 |
| Maxime Miltgen | | LSAP | | 17 July 2023 | 4 July 1993 |
| Antonia Afonso Bagine | | LSAP | | 17 July 2023 | 28 July 1974 |
| Marie-Marthe Muller | | LSAP (Note: Elected on the Pirate Party list in 2023, but defected to the LSAP in September 2024.) | | 8 July 2024 | 10 April 1962 |
| Tom Weidig | | ADR | | 17 July 2023 | 7 December 1972 |
| David Wagner | | Lénk | | 30 September 2024 | 3 March 1979 |

== Past elections ==
=== 2017 elections ===
Results of the 2017 election

| Party | Popular vote | Seats | Change |
|---|---|---|---|
| Democratic Party (DP) | 30,04% | 9 | ▼1 |
| Christian Social People's Party (CSV) | 25,03% | 7 | ▲2 |
| The Greens | 19,26% | 5 | 0 |
| Luxembourg Socialist Workers' Party (LSAP) | 11,09% | 3 | ▼1 |
| The Left | 6,79% | 2 | 0 |
| Alternative Democratic Reform Party (ADR) | 4,3% | 1 | 0 |
| Pirate Party of Luxembourg | 2,64% | 0 | – |
| Communist Party of Luxembourg (KPL) | 0,84% | 0 | – |
| Total: | | 27 | |

=== 2011 elections ===
Elections were held on 9 October 2011, and resulted in a victory for the Democratic Party (DP). The DP formed a coalition with The Greens, who had the third-largest contingent, under the leadership of Lydie Polfer.

2011 election results
| Party | Popular vote | Seats | Change |
|---|---|---|---|
| Democratic Party (DP) | 33,65% | 10 | ▼1 |
| Christian Social People's Party (CSV) | 19,05% | 5 | ▼1 |
| The Greens | 18,45% | 5 | 0 |
| Luxembourg Socialist Workers' Party (LSAP) | 15,93% | 4 | 0 |
| The Left | 6,45% | 2 | ▲2 |
| Alternative Democratic Reform Party (ADR) | 5,02% | 1 | 0 |
| Total: | | 27 | |

=== 2005 elections ===
| Party | Popular vote | Seats |
|---|---|---|
| Democratic Party (DP) | 35,86% | 11 |
| Christian Social People's Party (CSV) | 22,17% | 6 |
| The Greens | 17,33% | 5 |
| Luxembourg Socialist Workers' Party (LSAP) | 16,22% | 4 |
| Alternative Democratic Reform Party (ADR) | 3,92% | 1 |

== See also ==
- Mayor of Luxembourg City
