= Jup Weber =

Luxembourgish politician (1950–2021)

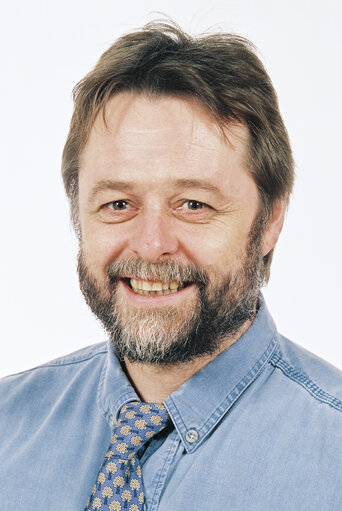
Jup Weber

Joseph Giovanni 'Jup' Weber (15 June 1950 – 8 October 2021) was a Luxembourgish politician.

Weber was instrumental in the foundation of the original Greens in 1983, and joined the Green List Ecological Initiative when the party split in two in 1985. After the two-halves reunited, Weber was one of Luxembourg's six Members of the European Parliament (1994–1999). He left the Greens in 1995, defecting in the European Parliament to the European Radical Alliance. In 1999, his new party, the Green and Liberal Alliance, ran against the Greens in both the legislative elections and European elections. The party was beaten into sixth place in all legislative circonscriptions and in the European election. After this failure to break through, the party was disbanded.
