= Nathalie Oberweis =

Luxembourgish politician (born 1983)

Member of the Chamber of Deputies
- In office 19 May 2021 – 24 October 2023
- Preceded by: David Wagner
- Succeeded by: David Wagner
- Constituency: Centre

Personal details
- Born: 20 February 1983 (age 42) Luxembourg City, Luxembourg
- Political party: The Left

Nathalie Oberweis (born 20 February 1983) is a Luxembourgish politician of The Left. From 2021 to 2023, she served as a member of the Chamber of Deputies.
