= Enrôlés de Force =

Defunct single-issue political party in Luxembourg

Enrôlés de Force (Luxembourgish: Zwangsrekrutéierten, German: Zwangsrekruten) was a Luxembourgish single-issue political party and pressure group. It sought to represent the interests of the 12,000 people who had been conscripted into the Wehrmacht during the German occupation of Luxembourg during the Second World War.

The party tried to claim compensation for those conscripted from the government of West Germany as victims of Nazi Germany. Enrôlés de Force won a single seat in the Chamber of Deputies at the 1979 legislative election, having won 4.4% of the vote. In office, they lobbied for official recognition from Luxembourg's government that conscripts were victims of Nazi Germany, which was achieved on 12 June 1981: ending a thirty-year national debate. The party dissolved after achieving this success, and its sole deputy joined the Christian Social People's Party.

Enrôlés de Force was the second party to represent this interest, after the Popular Independent Movement, which had won two seats in the 1964 election.
