= Aly Jaerling =

Luxembourgish politician

Alphonse 'Aly' Jaerling (born 30 January 1948 in Esch-sur-Alzette) is a Luxembourgish politician. He sat in the Chamber of Deputies from 1999, when he was first elected for the Alternative Democratic Reform Party (ADR) until 2009. He is also a member of Esch-sur-Alzette's communal council (1993 – 1999, 2000 – ).

Jaerling left the ADR on 1 May 2006, protesting at the shift in the party's emphasis away from pension reform, which had originally been the ADR's raison d'être, and decrying the 'nationalism' espoused by the party. The party had recently renamed itself from 'Action Committee for Democracy and Pensions Justice', a name that it had borne since 1992, as part of its gradual metamorphosis from a single-issue party to one of the established parties. However, Jaerling's departure dealt the party a major blow, reducing the party's deputation in the Chamber of Deputies to four seats, ending its qualification as a party caucus (it qualifies now only as a 'group'), and calling into question the party's future.

In the 2009 election, Jaerling ran for the Citizens' List, heading the list in Sud. The party came last of the eight parties running, and Jaerling was not elected.
