= Independent Socialist Party (Luxembourg) =

Former political party in Luxembourg

The Independent Socialist Party (Luxembourgish: Parti socialiste indépendant), also known as Jean Gremling's Independent Socialist List, was a political party in Luxembourg in the 1970s and 1980s.

== History ==
The party was formed to contest the 1979 elections by Jean Gremling. Running a campaign that accused the Luxembourg Socialist Workers' Party of compromising on socialism, it succeeded in winning a single seat, taken by Gremling.

However, the party lost its seat in the 1984 elections, and subsequently disappeared.
