= The Taxpayer (Luxembourg) =

Political party

The Taxpayer (Luxembourgish: De Steierzueler, French: Le Contribuable, German: Der Steuerzahler) was a political party in Luxembourg. It contested the 1999 election to the Chamber of Deputies, but disbanded afterwards.

The Taxpayer was a middle-class party that campaigned for lower government expenditure, and more transparency in government budgetary spending. In 1999, it contested only the Centre constituency, in which it came eighth and last, with only 1.3% of the vote. This amounted to 0.4% nationwide.

A disproportionate number of these votes were cast for the leader Jhemp Bertrand, a long-time councillor in Schuttrange and tax resister who had run under a number of other party names before.
