= Party of the Third Age =

Luxembourgish political party

The Party of the Third Age (Luxembourgish: Partei vum 3. Alter, French: Parti du Troisième Âge) was a political party in Luxembourg. It contested the 1999 election to the Chamber of Deputies, but has since disbanded.

Its party platform was dedicated to pensioners' issues, and its name is a reference to its core constituency. In its only legislative election in which it stood candidates, in 1999, it contested only the Sud constituency, in which it came eighth and last, with 0.4% of the vote. It folded soon afterwards.
