= Jhemp Bertrand =

Luxembourgish politician (1921–2008)

Jean-Pierre "Jhemp" Bertrand (1921 – 1 July 2008) was a politician and activist in Luxembourg. He was a councillor in Schuttrange for 43 years, and was a perennial candidate.

A tax collector by profession, Bertrand became a tax resister. Bertrand started politics as a member of the Democratic Party, before founding a number of parties to advance his politics, including the Liberal Party (1979), the Republican Party (1989), the Party for Regional and Real Politics (1994), and The Taxpayer (1999).
