= 1964 Luxembourg general election =

- 7 June 1964
- 56 seats in the Chamber of Deputies; 29 seats needed for a majority
Party	Leader	Vote %	Seats	+/–
LSAP	Henry Cravatte	37.68	21	+4
CSV	Pierre Werner	33.28	22	+1
KPL	Dominique Urbany	12.47	5	+2
DP	Eugène Schaus	10.57	6	−5
MIP	François Servais	6.01	2	New
This lists parties that won seats. See the complete results below.
Most voted-for party by municipality and constituency
Prime Minister before	Prime Minister after
Pierre Werner; CSV	Pierre Werner; CSV

General elections were held in Luxembourg on 7 June 1964. Despite receiving fewer votes than the Luxembourg Socialist Workers' Party (LSAP), the Christian Social People's Party (CSV) remained the largest party, winning 22 of the 56 seats in the Chamber of Deputies. Following the elections, the Werner-Cravatte Government was formed, a coalition between the CSV and the LSAP. Pierre Werner remained Prime Minister, and Henry Cravatte became his Deputy Prime Minister. This put an end to the previous government, a CSV–Democratic coalition, the Werner-Schaus Ministry.

== Results ==
Party	Votes	%	Seats	+/–
Luxembourg Socialist Workers' Party	999,843	37.68	21	+4
Christian Social People's Party	883,079	33.28	22	+1
Communist Party of Luxembourg	330,909	12.47	5	+2
Democratic Party	280,644	10.57	6	–5
Popular Independent Movement	159,370	6.01	2	New
Total	2,653,845	100.00	56	+4
Valid votes	163,158	93.93		
Invalid/blank votes	10,544	6.07		
Total votes	173,702	100.00		
Registered voters/turnout	191,788	90.57		
Source: Nohlen & Stöver
