= 1979 Luxembourg general election =

- 10 June 1979
- 59 seats in the Chamber of Deputies; 30 seats needed for a majority
- Turnout: 88.85% (▼1.29 pp)
Party	Leader	Vote %	Seats	+/–
CSV	Jacques Santer	34.51	24	+6
DP	Gaston Thorn	21.32	15	+1
LSAP	Lydie Schmit	24.26	14	−3
PSD	Henry Cravatte	5.98	2	−3
KPL		5.83	2	−3
Enrôlés de Force		4.45	1	New
PSI	Jean Gremling	2.20	1	New
This lists parties that won seats. See the complete results below.
Most voted-for party by municipality
Prime Minister before	Prime Minister after
Gaston Thorn; DP	Pierre Werner; CSV

General elections were held in Luxembourg on 10 June 1979. The Christian Social People's Party remained the largest party, winning 24 of the 59 seats in the Chamber of Deputies. After spending the previous four years in opposition, it returned to government in coalition with the Democratic Party, resulting in the Werner-Thorn Ministry.

== Results ==
Party	Votes	%	Seats	+/–
Christian Social People's Party	1,049,390	34.51	24	+6
Luxembourg Socialist Workers' Party	737,863	24.26	14	–3
Democratic Party	648,404	21.32	15	+1
Social Democratic Party	181,805	5.98	2	–3
Communist Party of Luxembourg	177,286	5.83	2	–3
Enrôlés de Force	135,360	4.45	1	New
Independent Socialist Party	66,909	2.20	1	New
Alternative List - Wiert Iech	30,269	1.00	0	New
Liberal Party	6,133	0.20	0	0
Revolutionary Community League	6,985	0.23	0	0
Club of Independents	849	0.03	0	New
Total	3,041,253	100.00	59	0
Valid votes	175,808	93.06		
Invalid/blank votes	13,101	6.94		
Total votes	188,909	100.00		
Registered voters/turnout	212,614	88.85		
Source: Nohlen & Stöver, Global Elections Database
