= 2009 Luxembourg general election =

- 7 June 2009
- All 60 seats in the Chamber of Deputies; 31 seats were needed for a majority
- Turnout: 90.93% (▼0.99 pp)
Party	Leader	Vote %	Seats	+/–
CSV	Jean-Claude Juncker	37.34	26	+2
LSAP	Jean Asselborn	23.00	13	−1
DP	Claude Meisch	14.31	9	−1
Greens	No spitzenkandidat	11.48	7	0
ADR	Gast Gibéryen	7.69	4	−1
The Left	No spitzenkandidat	3.61	1	+1
This lists parties that won seats. See the complete results below.
Most voted-for party by municipality and constituency
Prime Minister before	Prime Minister after
Jean-Claude Juncker; CSV	Jean-Claude Juncker; CSV

General elections were held in Luxembourg on 7 June 2009, together with the 2009 election to the European Parliament. All sixty members of the Chamber of Deputies were elected for five years. The polls were topped by the Christian Social People's Party, which built upon its already high number of seats to achieve a commanding victory, with the highest vote share and number of seats of any party since 1954. Incumbent prime minister Jean-Claude Juncker, who was the longest-serving head of government in the European Union, renewed the coalition agreement with Deputy Prime Minister and Luxembourg Socialist Workers' Party leader Jean Asselborn and formed the Juncker–Asselborn II Government, which was sworn in on 23 July 2009.

== Parties ==
Seven parties ran candidates in all four circonscriptions, of which, five were already represented in the Chamber of Deputies: the Christian Social People's Party (CSV), the Luxembourg Socialist Workers' Party (LSAP), the Democratic Party (DP), the Greens, and the Alternative Democratic Reform Party (ADR). Two parties that were not then represented also ran: The Left and the Communist Party (KPL). In addition, the Citizens' List, which was headed by current independent deputy Aly Jaerling, ran in two constituencies.

List #	Party	Running in				Seats	
List #	Party	Centre	Est	Nord	Sud	2004	Pre-election
1	Communist Party (KPL)					0	0
2	Greens					7	7
3	Alternative Democratic Reform Party (ADR)					5	4
4	Luxembourg Socialist Workers' Party (LSAP)					14	14
5	Democratic Party (DP)					10	10
6	The Left					0	0
7	Christian Social People's Party (CSV)					24	24
8	Citizens' List					0	1

== Opinion polls ==
=== Seat projections ===
Publication date	Source	CSV	LSAP	DP	DG	ADR	DL
30 April 2009	TNS-ILRES	24	14	9	7	6	0
6 Dec 2008	TNS-ILRES	22	12-13	10-11	8	7	0
20 June 2008	TNS-ILRES	22	14	10	8	6	0
15 Dec 2007	TNS-ILRES	22-23	13-14	9	8-9	6	0
9 June 2007	TNS-ILRES	22	14/15	9/10	8	6	0
9 Dec 2006	TNS-ILRES	23-24	15	8-9	9	4	0
17 June 2006	TNS-ILRES	23-25	15	7-9	7-9	3-6	0
17 Dec 2005	TNS-ILRES	23-24	13-14	9	9	5	0
18 June 2005	TNS-ILRES	23	14	9	9	5	0
18 Dec 2004	TNS-ILRES	24	14	9	9	4	0
13 June 2004	Election	24	14	10	7	5	0

== Results ==
Party	Raw results		Weighted results (Note: Calculated separately for each constituency (rounded to the nearest whole number) using the formula: $$\mbox{party's} \; \mbox{votes} \times \frac{\mbox{total} \; \mbox{of} \; \mbox{valid} \; \mbox{ballots}}{\mbox{total} \; \mbox{of} \; \mbox{valid} \; \mbox{votes}}$$)		Seats	+/–
Party	Votes	%	Votes	%	Seats	+/–
Christian Social People's Party	1,129,368	37.34	72,160	37.98	26	+2
Luxembourg Socialist Workers' Party	695,830	23.00	41,219	21.70	13	–1
Democratic Party	432,820	14.31	28,322	14.91	9	–1
The Greens	347,388	11.48	22,202	11.69	7	0
Alternative Democratic Reform Party	232,744	7.69	15,415	8.11	4	–1
The Left	109,184	3.61	6,289	3.31	1	+1
Communist Party of Luxembourg	49,108	1.62	2,822	1.49	0	0
Citizens' List	28,512	0.94	1,564	0.82	0	New
Total	3,024,954	100.00	189,993	100.00	60	0
Valid votes	190,213	93.45				
Invalid/blank votes	13,322	6.55				
Total votes	203,535	100.00				
Registered voters/turnout	223,842	90.93				
Source: Elections in Luxembourg, Nohlen & Stöver

=== By locality ===
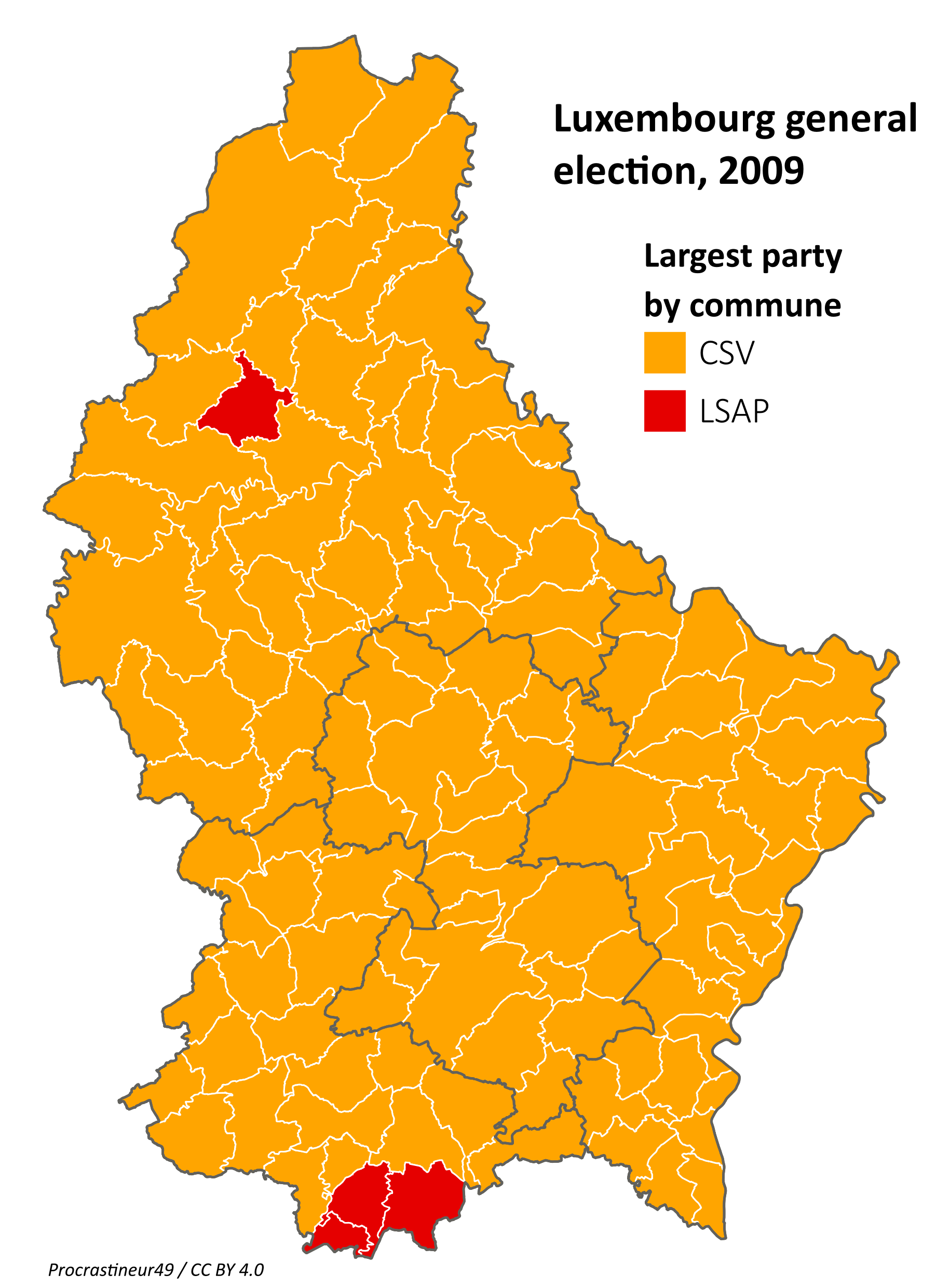
The CSV won a landslide victory, winning pluralities in 112 of Luxembourg's 116 communes, with the LSAP winning pluralities in four.

As in 2004, the CSV won pluralities in each of Luxembourg's four circonscriptions, and pluralities in nearly all of Luxembourg's communes. Only four communes didn't register pluralities for the CSV (down from seven in 2004). Wiltz in the north and Dudelange, Kayl, and Rumelange in the southern Red Lands voted for the LSAP.

The CSV's performance improved most markedly in Centre, where it increased its vote from 35.5% to 38.6%. In Centre, the CSV received almost twice as many votes as the Democratic Party in, only ten years after the DP won a plurality by over 2%. It gained one extra seat in Centre, and another in Est.

=== Votes by constituency ===
Constituency	CSV		LSAP		DP		Gréng		ADR		Lénk		KPL		BL	
Centre	390,057	38.6	180,196	17.8	196,469	19.4	133,490	13.2	63,790	6.3	35,411	3.5	11,037	1.1	–	–
East	72,030	41.5	28,183	16.2	26,791	15.4	24,577	14.2	16,510	9.5	3,911	2.3	1,685	1.0	–	–
North	114,658	39.6	50,408	17.4	52,653	18.2	31,223	10.8	29,710	10.3	5,785	2.0	2,836	1.0	2,286	0.8
South	552623	35.6	437,043	28.2	156,907	10.1	158,098	10.2	122,734	7.9	64,077	4.1	33,550	2.2	26,226	1.7

=== Seats by constituency ===
Constituency	Total seats	Seats won					
Constituency	Total seats	CSV	LSAP	DP	Gréng	ADR	Lénk
Centre	21	9	4	4	3	1	
East	7	4	1	1	1		
North	9	4	1	2	1	1	
South	23	9	7	2	2	2	1

== Aftermath ==
The CSV's large margin of victory guaranteed that it would form the government once again, with Jean-Claude Juncker appointed as formateur and likely to remain as Prime Minister. Before the election, Juncker, Europe's longest-serving head of government, had told his party that he intended to step down as Minister for Finances, to be replaced by Luc Frieden. This brought into question his chairmanship of the Europe-wide Eurogroup, which he had chaired since 2005. However, he has since stated that he would remain in charge of monetary policy and relations with the European Central Bank.

The CSV was in a strong enough position to form a coalition with any one of three parties: LSAP (partner in the Juncker-Asselborn Ministry I), the DP (partner in the Juncker-Polfer Ministry), and the Greens (who had never previously entered the government). However, the DP and Greens had both ruled out the possibility of a coalition with the CSV, leaving only the previous coalition partners, LSAP, in the running. The CSV and LSAP formed a coalition agreement, with Juncker as Prime Minister and Jean Asselborn as Deputy Prime Minister, with the new government forming on 23 July.
