= National Movement (Luxembourg) =

The National Movement (Luxembourgish: National Bewegong, French: Mouvement National, German: National Bewegung) was a far-right political party in Luxembourg.

The National Movement rose to prominence as a result of the legislative and European elections in 1989, when under the leadership of Pierre Peters. In the European elections, it recorded 2.9% of the vote nationwide.

The last elections that it contested were the legislative and European elections on 12 June 1994. They came at the height of a wave of indiscriminate racist attacks, neo-Nazi demonstrations in Luxembourg, and it was suggested that the National Movement may capitalise by winning a seat in the Chamber of Deputies. However, in domestic and European elections, its share of the vote fell, the party failed to win a seat in either election, and it was promptly disbanded.

== Electoral results ==
=== Chamber of Deputies ===
Election	Votes			Seats		Rank	Government	Leader of the national list
Election	#	%	±pp	#	+/−	Rank	Government	Leader of the national list
1989	82,316	2.3%	–	0 / 60	±0	8#	extra-parliamentary	
1994	82,851	2.6%	–	0 / 60	±0	6#	extra-parliamentary	

=== European Parliament ===
Election year	# of overall votes	% of overall vote	# of overall seats won	+/-	Notes
1989	28,867	2.90% 7#	0 / 6	▲0	
1994	24,141	2.38% 6#	0 / 6	▼0	
