= François Benoy =

Luxembourgish politician (born 1985)

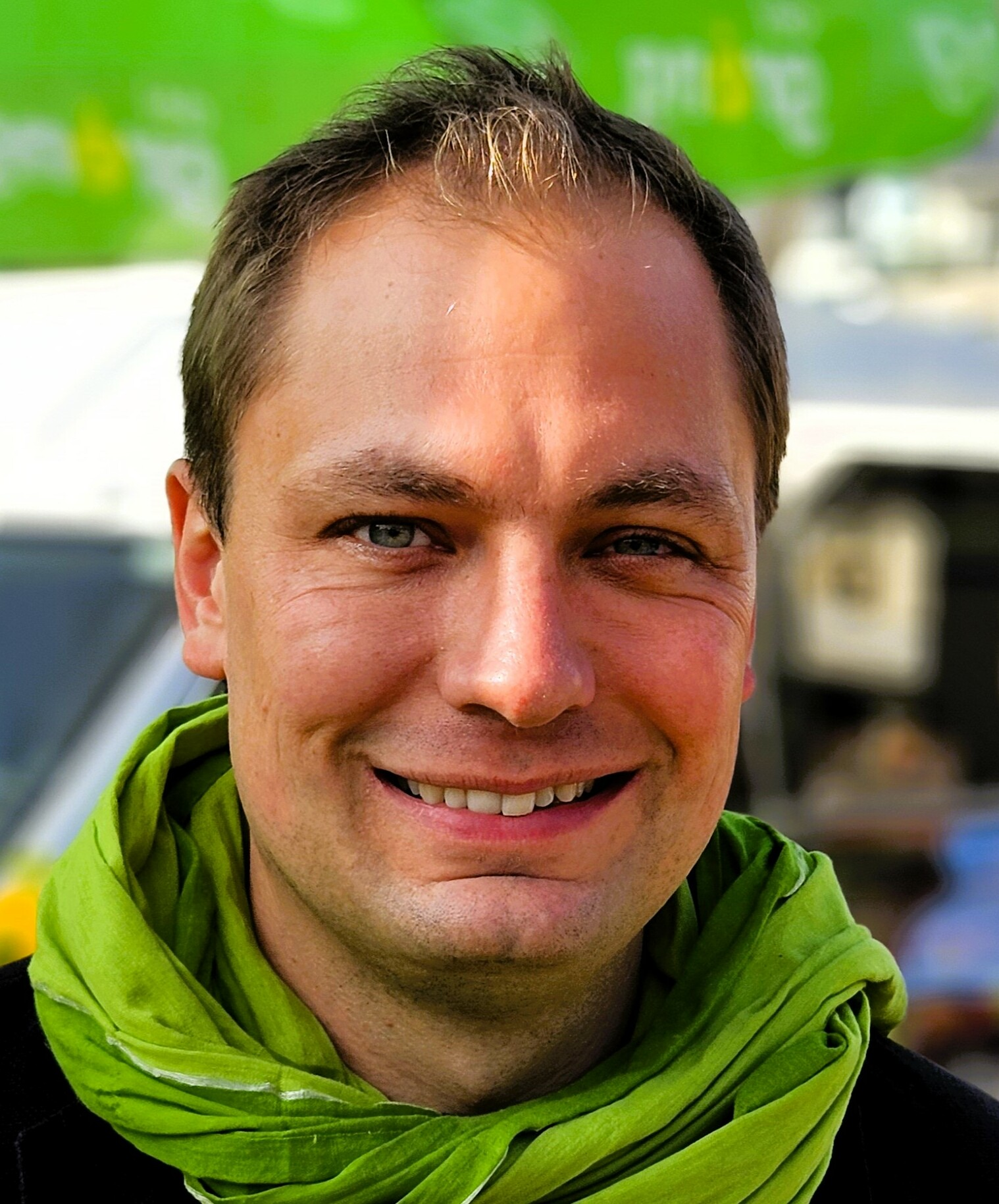
- Benoy in 2023

Member of the Chamber of Deputies
- In office 30 October 2018 – 23 October 2023
- Constituency: Centre

Personal details
- Born: 7 February 1985 (age 41)
- Party: The Greens

François Benoy (born 7 February 1985) is a Luxembourgish politician serving as co-president of The Greens since 2024. From 2018 to 2023, he was a member of the Chamber of Deputies.
