= 1999 European Parliament election in Luxembourg =

The 1999 European Parliament election in Luxembourg was the election of MEP representing Luxembourg constituency for the 1999–2004 term of the European Parliament. It was part of the wider 1999 European election. It was held on 13 June 1999.

== Candidates ==
List #	Party	Existing seats
1	The Left	0
2	Luxembourg Socialist Workers' Party (LSAP)	2
3	Democratic Party (DP)	1
4	Action Committee for Democracy and Pensions Justice (ADR)	0
5	Green and Liberal Alliance (GaL)	0
6	Christian Social People's Party (CSV)	2
7	The Greens	1

== Results ==
Party	Votes	%	Seats	+/–
Christian Social People's Party	321,021	31.67	2	0
Luxembourg Socialist Workers' Party	239,048	23.58	2	0
Democratic Party	207,379	20.46	1	0
The Greens	108,514	10.70	1	0
Action Committee for Democracy and Pensions Justice	91,118	8.99	0	0
The Left	28,130	2.77	0	0
Green and Liberal Alliance	18,573	1.83	0	New
Total	1,013,783	100.00	6	0
Valid votes	184,838	91.33		
Invalid/blank votes	17,546	8.67		
Total votes	202,384	100.00		
Registered voters/turnout	233,602	86.64		
Source: Parlgov

=== Elected members ===
Christian Social People's Party

Members of the European People's Party

- Astrid Lulling
- Jacques Santer

Democratic Party

Members of the European Liberal Democrat and Reform Party

- Colette Flesch

Luxembourg Socialist Workers' Party

Members of the Party of European Socialists

- Robert Goebbels
- Jacques Poos

The Greens

Members of the European Federation of Green Parties

- Claude Turmes
