= Free Party of Luxembourg =

Defunct political party in Luxembourg

The Free Party of Luxembourg (Luxembourgish: Fräi Partei Lëtzebuerg), abbreviated as FPL, was a political party in Luxembourg.

== Foundation and 2004 elections ==
Founded in 2003, it emerged onto the political scene in the run-up to the 2004 legislative elections for the Chamber of Deputies. It fielded 8 candidates, none of whom was elected. The party totalled 0.1% of votes cast nationally, finishing last of the eight party lists. Following the 2004 legislative elections, the party had difficulty in continuing to organise.

== Regionally based support, leadership, and manifesto ==
Most of the party's candidates were from the northern Éislek region of Luxembourg. This is a sparsely populated area characterised by its relative isolation from the south of Luxembourg.

The FPL's founder, Jean Ersfeld, is a local personality with a limited following in that region. The party's manifesto was essentially right-wing and nationalist, seeking to appeal to the rural communities in the north.

== Issues ==
Among the issues of concern to supporters of the FPL was immigration. As in other small countries of Europe, such as Monaco, the European Union's support for political rights for immigrants has been viewed as particularly problematic.
