= Green and Liberal Alliance =

The Green and Liberal Alliance (Luxembourgish: Gréng a Liberal Allianz; French: Alliance verte et libérale) was a green political party in Luxembourg. It was led by Jup Weber, who was instrumental in founding the Greens and had been one of Luxembourg's six Members of the European Parliament.

It contested the 1999 election to the Chamber of Deputies. It recorded 1.1% of the vote nationwide, coming sixth in all four constituencies and not winning a seat. It has since disbanded.
