= The Greens (Luxembourg) =

Political party in Luxembourg

The Greens Déi Gréng
- Leader: Stéphanie Empain; François Benoy
- Founded: 23 June 1983
- Headquarters: 96, rue du Kiem; L-8030 Strassen
- Youth wing: Déi Jonk Gréng (Young Greens)
- Ideology: Green politics Pro-Europeanism
- Political position: Centre-left
- Regional affiliation: SGD/SVD
- European affiliation: European Green Party
- European Parliament group: Greens/EFA
- International affiliation: Global Greens
- Colours: Green
- Chamber of Deputies: 4 / 60
- European Parliament: 1 / 6
- Local Councils: 64 / 722
- Benelux Parliament: 1 / 7

Website
- greng.lu

The Greens (Luxembourgish: Déi Gréng, French: Les Verts, German: Die Grünen) is a green political party in Luxembourg.

== Party history ==
=== 1983–93 ===
The Luxembourgish Greens were founded on 23 June 1983 as the Green Alternative Party (GAP). Among its founding members were people engaged in the peace movement and the movement against a nuclear power plant in Luxembourg. Many came from left socialist groups that had split from the LSAP and from the former Maoist movement who had already in 1979 been involved in the electoral Alternative List - Resist. In the 1984 elections, the party two seats in the Chamber of Deputies. In 1985, however the GAP split and its more conservative wing founded the Green List Ecological Initiative (GLEI). They competed separately in the 1989 election, where they won two seats each.

=== 1994–2003 ===
The party's former logo

In 1994, the two parties presented a common list for the elections. They won five seats in the Chamber, getting nearly 11% of the votes, which made them the fourth strongest force in parliament. In that year's European elections, which coincided with the national elections, the party won one of the six seats allotted to Luxembourg. In 1995, the two parties merged officially. That same year, the Greens' MEP, Jup Weber, left the party again, forming the Green and Liberal Alliance and joining the European Radical Alliance in the European Parliament.

In the 1999 elections, the party lost a considerable number of votes (falling to 9%), but retained its five seats in the Chamber and re-gained its single seat in the European Parliament.

=== Since 2004 ===
In 2004, the Greens regained the ground that they had lost in 1999 and won two additional seats in the Chamber. Although they got 15% of the votes in the coinciding European elections, placing them third, they couldn't add to their single seat.

In the June 2009 elections, the Luxembourg Green Party further increased their European score to 16,83% and sent its outgoing MEP Claude Turmes to Brussels and Strasbourg for a third mandate. In the coinciding national elections, they kept a status quo (+0,13%). Its 7 Members of Parliament (MP) all got reelected. However, its longest serving MP and founding member Jean Huss declared the following day, that he would retire from parliamentary politics in 2011 to the benefit of Josée Lorsché.

In the 2013 general election, the Greens stagnated at 10.1% and their number of seats dropped to 6. However, they became part of a three-party-coalition government with the liberal Democratic Party (DP) and the Luxembourg Socialist Workers' Party (LSAP) led by DP's Xavier Bettel. The Greens had three ministers: Félix Braz, Minister for Justice, François Bausch, Minister for Sustainable Development and Infrastructure and Carole Dieschbourg, Minister for the Environment. It was the first time that the Greens were part of a national government of Luxembourg.

Since the 2023 election, they have been in opposition again.

== Ideology and issues ==
The Greens focus mainly on environmental and sustainability issues. Their policy priorities have included sustainable development, ecological tax reform, renewable energy, energy efficiency, and the consolidation of pension funds. The party also supports measures to increase the political and social participation of migrants in Luxembourg.

Furthermore, in its declaration of principles it has outlined, among others, the following priorities:

- Human rights and solidarity
- Democracy
- Social justice
- Structural change of the economy
- Equality between men and women
- A commitment to a green and social Europe.

== Electoral results ==
=== Chamber of Deputies ===
Election	Votes	%	Seats	+/–	Government
1984	169,862	4.2 (#4)	2 / 64	New	Opposition
1989	275,756	8.6 (#5)	4 / 60	▲2	Opposition
1994	303,991	9.9 (#4)	5 / 60	▲1	Opposition
1999	266,644	9.1 (#5)	5 / 60	0	Opposition
2004	355,895	11.6 (#4)	7 / 60	▲2	Opposition
2009	347,388	11.7 (#4)	7 / 60	0	Opposition
2013	331,920	10.1 (#4)	6 / 60	▼1	Coalition
2018	533,893	15.1 (#4)	9 / 60	▲3	Coalition
2023	321,895	8.6 (#5)	4 / 60	▼5	Opposition

=== European Parliament ===
Election	List leader	Votes	%	Seats	+/–	EP Group
1984	Jean Huss	60,152	6.08 (#4)	0 / 6	New	–
1989	Jean Huss	42,926	4.32 (#6)	0 / 6	0	–
1994	Jup Weber	110,888	10.93 (#4)	1 / 6	▲1	G
1999	Camille Gira	108,514	10.70 (#4)	1 / 6	0	G/EFA
2004	Claude Turmes	163,754	15.02 (#3)	1 / 6	0	G/EFA
2009	Claude Turmes	189,523	16.83 (#4)	1 / 6	0	G/EFA
2014	Claude Turmes	176,073	15.02 (#2)	1 / 6	0	G/EFA
2019	Tilly Metz	237,215	18.91 (#3)	1 / 6	0	G/EFA
2024	Tilly Metz	162,955	11.76 (#4)	1 / 6	0	G/EFA

== Organisation ==
=== Organisational structure ===
The Congress is the highest organ of the party. It sets out the party's strategy and political course and is open to all members of the party. Every two years, the congress elects the leadership of the party's organisation: two presidents, an executive committee, the party board in which the party's youth wing and the gender council are also represented, an executive council that represents the congress, the treasurer and a financial control board.

=== International organisations ===
The Greens are member of the European Green Party and the Global Greens.

== See also ==
- Green party
- Green politics
- List of environmental organizations
- List of political parties in Luxembourg
