= 2004 Luxembourg general election =

- 13 June 2004
- All 60 seats in the Chamber of Deputies; 31 seats needed for a majority
- Turnout: 91.92% (▲5.41 pp)
| Party | Leader | Vote % | Seats | +/– |
|---|---|---|---|---|
| CSV | Jean-Claude Juncker | 35.81 | 24 | +5 |
| LSAP | Jean Asselborn | 25.43 | 14 | +1 |
| DP | Lydie Polfer | 14.94 | 10 | −5 |
| Greens | No spitzenkandidat | 11.54 | 7 | +2 |
| ADR | Gast Gibéryen | 9.04 | 5 | −2 |
This lists parties that won seats. See the complete results below.
Most voted-for party by municipality and constituency
| Prime Minister before | Prime Minister after |
|---|---|
| Jean-Claude Juncker; CSV | Jean-Claude Juncker; CSV |

General elections were held in Luxembourg on 13 June 2004, alongside European Parliament elections. The ruling Christian Social People's Party (CSV) of Prime Minister Jean-Claude Juncker won the election, increasing its number of seats to its highest since before 1989 and its share of the vote to levels not seen since the 1959 election.

As expected, the CSV won a plurality of seats, adding 5 new deputies, and continued as the majority partner in the coalition government. However, the junior partner changed from the liberal Democratic Party (DP), which lost 5 seats, to the Luxembourg Socialist Workers' Party (LSAP), which gained one seat. The Greens also slightly increased their representation, whilst the Alternative Democratic Reform Party (ADR) lost ground.

The election coincided with the 2004 European Parliament election.

== Candidates ==
| List # | Party | Running in | | | | Existing seats |
| List # | Party | Centre | Est | Nord | Sud | Existing seats |
|---|---|---|---|---|---|---|
| 1 | Alternative Democratic Reform Party (ADR) | | | | | 7 |
| 2 | Democratic Party (DP) | | | | | 15 |
| 3 | Luxembourg Socialist Workers' Party (LSAP) | | | | | 13 |
| 4 | The Greens | | | | | 5 |
| 5 | Christian Social People's Party (CSV) | | | | | 19 |
| 6 | The Left | | | | | 1 |
| 7 | Communist Party (KPL) | | | | | 0 |
| 8 | Free Party (FPL) | | | | | 0 |

== Opinion polls ==
=== Seat projections ===
| Publication date | Source | CSV | LSAP | DP | DG | ADR | DL |
|---|---|---|---|---|---|---|---|
| 3 April 2004 | TNS-ILRES | 22-23 | 13-15 | 9-10 | 7-8 | 6-7 | 0 |
| 29 Nov 2003 | TNS-ILRES | 22 | 15 | 9 | 8 | 6 | 0 |
| 7 June 2003 | TNS-ILRES | 20 | 15-16 | 11-12 | 6-7 | 6 | 1 |
| 13 June 1999 | Election | 19 | 13 | 15 | 5 | 7 | 1 |

== Results ==
| Party | Raw results | | Weighted results (Note: Calculated separately for each constituency (rounded to the nearest whole number) using the formula: $$\mbox{party's} \; \mbox{votes} \times \frac{\mbox{total} \; \mbox{of} \; \mbox{valid} \; \mbox{ballots}}{\mbox{total} \; \mbox{of} \; \mbox{valid} \; \mbox{votes}}$$) | | Seats | +/– |
| Party | Votes | % | Votes | % | Seats | +/– |
|---|---|---|---|---|---|---|
| Christian Social People's Party | 1,103,825 | 35.81 | 68,100 | 36.10 | 24 | 5 |
| Luxembourg Socialist Workers' Party | 784,048 | 25.43 | 44,273 | 23.47 | 14 | +1 |
| Democratic Party | 460,601 | 14.94 | 30,182 | 16.00 | 10 | –5 |
| The Greens | 355,895 | 11.54 | 21,842 | 11.58 | 7 | +2 |
| Action Committee for Democracy and Pensions Justice | 278,792 | 9.04 | 18,690 | 9.91 | 5 | –2 |
| The Left | 62,071 | 2.01 | 3,595 | 1.91 | 0 | –1 |
| Communist Party of Luxembourg | 35,524 | 1.15 | 1,756 | 0.93 | 0 | New |
| Free Party of Luxembourg | 1,925 | 0.06 | 226 | 0.12 | 0 | New |
| Total | 3,082,681 | 100.00 | 188,664 | 100.00 | 60 | 0 |
| Valid votes | 188,910 | 94.41 | | | | |
| Invalid/blank votes | 11,182 | 5.59 | | | | |
| Total votes | 200,092 | 100.00 | | | | |
| Registered voters/turnout | 217,683 | 91.92 | | | | |
Source: Elections in Luxembourg, Nohlen & Stöver

=== By locality ===
The CSV won pluralities in all four districts; in the previous election, the Democratic Party had won a plurality in Centre. However, the CSV won a better-than-average increase in their vote share in Luxembourg City (of 7.4%) and Centre generally (7.5%), wiping out the DP's advantage and winning 2 deputies in that constituency alone. The CSV's vote remaining roughly constant across all constituencies (in all cases between 35.5% and 38.6%).

On the communal level, the CSV won pluralities in 111 of the country's (then) 118 communes. The LSAP won pluralities in five communes in the industrial Red Lands: Differdange, Dudelange, Kayl, Rumelange, Schifflange. The DP won the northern communes of Schieren and Préizerdaul.

=== Votes by constituency ===
| Constituency | CSV | | LSAP | | DP | | Gréng | | ADR | | Lénk | | KPL | | FPL | |
|---|---|---|---|---|---|---|---|---|---|---|---|---|---|---|---|---|
| Centre | 365,372 | 35.5 | 193,327 | 18.8 | 219,700 | 21.3 | 140,547 | 13.6 | 81,233 | 7.9 | 20,451 | 2.0 | 8,887 | 0.9 | – | – |
| East | 64,386 | 38.6 | 27,535 | 16.5 | 31,799 | 19.1 | 20,191 | 12.1 | 20,593 | 12.3 | 2,179 | 1.3 | – | – | – | – |
| North | 100,922 | 36.3 | 43,819 | 15.8 | 56,246 | 20.2 | 30,294 | 10.9 | 40,991 | 14.7 | 3,725 | 1.3 | – | – | 1,916 | 0.7 |
| South | 574,950 | 35.6 | 520,809 | 32.2 | 153,122 | 9.5 | 165,531 | 10.2 | 136,503 | 8.4 | 36,868 | 2.3 | 27,058 | 1.7 | – | – |

=== Seats by constituency ===
| Constituency | Total seats | Seats won | | | | |
| Constituency | Total seats | CSV | LSAP | DP | Gréng | ADR |
|---|---|---|---|---|---|---|
| Centre | 21 | 8 | 4 | 5 | 3 | 1 |
| East | 7 | 3 | 1 | 1 | 1 | 1 |
| North | 9 | 4 | 1 | 2 | 1 | 1 |
| South | 23 | 9 | 8 | 2 | 2 | 2 |
