= 1999 Luxembourg general election =

- 13 June 1999
- All 60 seats in the Chamber of Deputies; 31 seats were needed for a majority
- Turnout: 86.51% (▼1.79 pp)
Party	Leader	Vote %	Seats	+/–
CSV	Jean-Claude Juncker	29.73	19	−2
LSAP	Robert Goebbels	23.74	13	−4
DP	Lydie Polfer	21.59	15	+3
Greens	No spitzenkandidat	10.37	5	0
ADR	Gast Gibéryen	9.10	7	+2
The Left	No spitzenkandidat	3.76	1	New
This lists parties that won seats. See the complete results below.
Most voted-for party by municipality and constituency
Prime Minister before	Prime Minister after
Jean-Claude Juncker; CSV	Jean-Claude Juncker; CSV

General elections were held in Luxembourg on 13 June 1999, alongside European Parliament elections. The Christian Social People's Party remained the largest party, winning 19 of the 60 seats in the Chamber of Deputies. It formed a coalition government with the Democratic Party.

== Candidates ==
List #	Party	Running in				Existing seats
List #	Party	Centre	Est	Nord	Sud	Existing seats
1	The Left					0
2	Luxembourg Socialist Workers' Party (LSAP)					17
3	Democratic Party (DP)					12
4	Action Committee for Democracy and Pensions Justice					5
5	Green and Liberal Alliance (GaL)					0
6	Christian Social People's Party (CSV)					21
7	The Greens					5
8	The Taxpayer					0
9	Party of the Third Age					0

== Results ==
Party	Raw results		Weighted results (Note: Calculated separately for each constituency (rounded to the nearest whole number) using the formula: $$\mbox{party's} \; \mbox{votes} \times \frac{\mbox{total} \; \mbox{of} \; \mbox{valid} \; \mbox{ballots}}{\mbox{total} \; \mbox{of} \; \mbox{valid} \; \mbox{votes}}$$)		Seats	+/–
Party	Votes	%	Votes	%	Seats	+/–
Christian Social People's Party	870,985	29.73	53,839	30.09	19	–2
Luxembourg Socialist Workers' Party	695,718	23.74	40,013	22.36	13	–4
Democratic Party	632,707	21.59	39,925	22.31	15	+3
Action Committee for Democracy and Pensions Justice	303,734	10.37	20,162	11.27	7	+2
The Greens	266,644	9.10	16,237	9.07	5	0
The Left	110,274	3.76	5,941	3.32	1	New
Green and Liberal Alliance	32,014	1.09	1,915	1.07	0	New
The Taxpayer	12,543	0.43	655	0.37	0	New
Party of the Third Age	5,382	0.18	257	0.14	0	New
Total	2,930,001	100.00	178,944	100.00	60	0
Valid votes	178,880	93.52				
Invalid/blank votes	12,387	6.48				
Total votes	191,267	100.00				
Registered voters/turnout	221,103	86.51				
Source: Elections in Luxembourg, Nohlen & Stöver, STATEC

=== By locality ===
The CSV won pluralities across almost all of the country, winning more votes than any other party in 86 of the country's (then) 118 communes. The LSAP won pluralities in 14 communes, mostly in the Red Lands in the south. The DP won 18 communes, particularly in its heartland of Luxembourg City and the surrounding communes.

=== Votes by constituency ===
Constituency	CSV		LSAP		DP		ADR		Gréng		Lénk		GaL		Steierzueler		Pv3A	
Centre	278,570	28.0	171107	30.1	298,629	17.2	94,343	9.5	95,973	9.7	28,015	2.8	14,231	1.4	12,532	1.3	–	–
East	48,767	32.4	27,037	24.6	36,935	18.0	20,403	13.6	13,007	8.6	2,458	1.6	1,680	1.1	–	–	–	–
North	80,682	31.3	42,643	24.3	62,371	16.5	43,146	16.7	23,640	9.2	3,656	1.4	1,986	0.8	–	–	–	–
South	462,365	30.3	454,150	15.4	234,459	29.8	145,335	9.5	133,534	8.7	76,105	5.0	14,100	0.9	–	–	5,336	0.4

=== Seats by constituency ===
Constituency	Total seats	Seats won					
Constituency	Total seats	CSV	LSAP	DP	ADR	Gréng	Lénk
Centre	21	6	4	7	2	2	
East	7	3	1	2	1		
North	9	3	1	2	2	1	
South	23	7	7	4	2	2	1
