= The Left (Luxembourg) =

Left-wing political party in Luxembourg

The Left Déi Lénk
- Leader: Collective leadership
- Founded: 30 January 1999
- Headquarters: 63, bvd de la Pétrusse, Luxembourg City
- Youth wing: Jonk Lénk
- Ideology: Democratic socialism; Republicanism
- Political position: Left-wing
- European affiliation: Party of the European Left
- European Parliament group: The Left in the European Parliament (associate)
- Colours: Red
- Chamber of Deputies: 2 / 60
- European Parliament: 0 / 6
- Local councils: 5 / 722

Website
- dei-lenk.lu

The Left (Luxembourgish: Déi Lénk [dɜɪ̯ ˈleŋk]; French: La Gauche [la ɡoʃ]; German: Die Linke [diː ˈlɪŋkə]) is a democratic socialist political party in Luxembourg. On the political spectrum, it is considered a left-wing to radical left political party. The Left is associated with The Left in the European Parliament – GUE/NGL group in the European Parliament but does not have any members. The party participates in the Party of the European Left. The Left wishes to transition Luxembourg from a constitutional monarchy into a republic.

The Left was founded by the New Left and the Communist Party of Luxembourg (KPL) as an electoral party. It had members from both parties and independents. In the 1999 Luxembourg general election, the Left won 3.3% of the votes and one seat in the parliament; André Hoffmann was elected from the southern constituency. In 2000, after anticipated elections in the city of Esch sur Alzette, Hoffmann became deputy mayor and Aloyse Bisdorff (KPL) succeeded him in parliament. In accordance with the Left's statutes, Bisdorff resigned from parliament and was succeeded by Serge Urbany in 2002. A dispute arose between a number of members of the KPL and the majority of the Left; as a result, the two parties ran separate lists in the 2004 Luxembourg general election. The Left won 1.9% of the votes and lost its parliamentary presence. In the 2009 Luxembourg general election, it increased its share of the vote to 3.3% and Hoffmann returned to parliament as the Left's sole representative; Hoffmann's personal vote of 9,067 in the south constituency was almost equal to the total number of votes gathered by the KPL, which won 10,803 votes. In 2013, the party elected two members (Serge Urbany and Justin Turpel).

== Election results ==
=== Chamber of Deputies ===
Election	Votes	%	Seats	+/–	Government
1999	110,274	3.3 (#6)	1 / 60	New	Opposition
2004	62,071	1.9 (#6)	0 / 60	▼1	Extra-parliamentary
2009	109,184	3.3 (#6)	1 / 60	▲1	Opposition
2013	161,759	4.5 (#6)	2 / 60	▲1	Opposition
2018	193,594	5.5 (#7)	2 / 60	0	Opposition
2023	147,839	3.9 (#7)	2 / 60	0	Opposition

Constituency	2023 votes	%	2018 votes	%	2013 votes	%	2009 votes	%	2004 votes	%	1999 votes	%
Centre	49,481	3.94	66,253	5.72	51,851	5.75	35,411	3.50	20,451	1.99	27,999	2.82
East	5,586	2.52	6,984	3.3	5,941	3.05	3,911	2.25	2,179	1.31	2,448	1.63
North	9,758	2.59	12,164	3.53	8,138	2.56	5,785	2.00	3,725	1.34	3,653	1.41
South	82,914	4.35	108,193	5.96	95,829	5.73	64,077	4.13	36,868	2.28	76,174	4.98

=== European Parliament ===
Election	List leader	Votes	%	Seats	+/–	EP Group
1999	Aloyse Bisdorff	28,130	2.77 (#6)	0 / 6	New	–
2004	André Hoffmann	18,345	1.68 (#6)	0 / 6	0	–
2009	André Hoffmann	37,929	3.37 (#6)	0 / 6	0	–
2014	André Hoffmann	67,513	5.76 (#6)	0 / 6	0	–
2019	David Wagner	60,648	4.83 (#7)	0 / 6	0	–
2024	Ana Correia da Veiga	43,701	3.15 (#7)	0 / 6	0	–

== Bibliography ==
- Wehenkel, Henri, Communisme et postcommunisme au Luxembourg, in: Communisme 2014, 1989–2014 – L'éternel retour des communistes, p. 165–172
- Wehenkel, Henri/Redondo, Jean-Laurent/Hoffmann, André/Urbany, Serge, Table ronde: PCL et/ou nouvelle gauche: renouvellement et/ou scission, in: Cahiers Marxistes, No. 201, April–May 1996, p. 121–144
