= Dupong-Schaus Government =

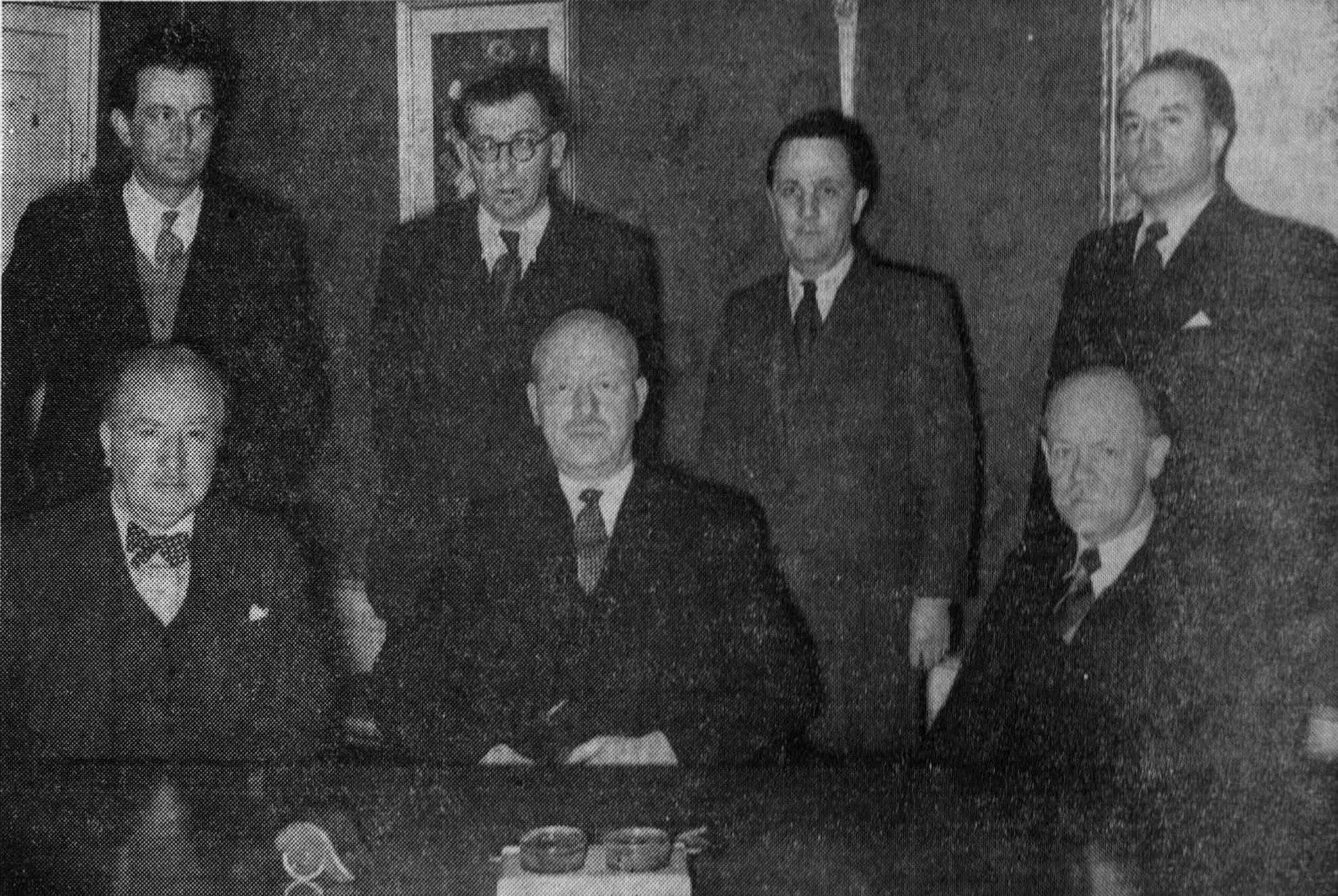
The government at its first meeting, on 3 March 1947

The Dupong-Schaus Government was the government of Luxembourg between 1 March 1947 and 3 July 1951. It was a coalition between the Christian Social People's Party (CSV), and the Democratic Group.

== Background ==
The Dupong-Schaus Government came about when the National Union government resigned. The CSV and the Democratic Group formed a coalition based on the support of 34 of 51 members of the Chamber of Deputies. However, at the partial elections of 6 June 1948, the LSAP once again became the strongest party in the South constituency, while the Communist Party took losses. Despite its good results, the LSAP decided to remain in opposition. Although Dupong was well-disposed to the idea of a three-party government to tackle the problem of reconstruction, the LSAP refused to join a coalition that contained the liberals. The LSAP advocated an economy based on dirigisme and planning, which was radically opposed to liberal ideas.

↓
25	9	11	5	1
CSV	DG	LSAP	KPL	PIE

The government's parliamentary majority before and after the elections of 1948.

↓
22	9	15	5
CSV	DG	LSAP	KPL

== Foreign policy ==
In an international political climate marked by the beginning of the Cold War, the Luxembourg government aligned itself definitively with the Western powers. It participated in different initiatives which put in place a system of military alliances between the countries of the West. On 17 March 1948, Luxembourg agreed to the pact of Brussels, in which France, the United Kingdom and the Benelux countries agreed to offer mutual assistance in case they were attacked. On 4 April 1949, Luxembourg signed the North Atlantic Treaty, which gave rise to NATO. These decisions were supported by the three major parties of the country, but not by the Communist Party.

Luxembourg, following the lead of the Allies, also normalised its relations with Germany. In 1949, it renounced its territorial claims, retaining only a forest near Vianden, the Kammerwald, as payment for war reparations.

Luxembourg also participated in the negotiations for putting the Marshall Plan into effect, through the framework of the Organisation for European Economic Co-operation (OEEC). It was one of the 16 European governments that met in Paris on 12 July 1947 to respond to the American Secretary of State's offer of aid. American aid was granted to the UEBL, within which it was then divided up in proportion to size of population and economic capacity. The Luxembourgish government profited from the OEEC in order to realise several large-scale projects such as the hydroelectric development of the Sûre and the Our.

When Robert Schuman launched his plan to create a common European market for coal and steel, Luxembourg was a party to this. On 18 April 1951, the Luxembourgish Minister for Foreign Affairs, Joseph Bech, signed the treaty setting up the European Coal and Steel Community, with his French, German, Italian, Belgian and Dutch colleagues. Even though, at the time, the French ambassador remarked that "Luxembourg could not not join" due to its lack of political clout on the international scene, the Luxembourgish government did not agree lightly to a scheme that put the main industry of the country under a supranational authority. After the war, the steel industry remained the driving force of the Luxembourgish economy. It employed a quarter of the active population, and provided almost two-thirds of the country's industrial production. During the negotiations, the Luxembourgish government succeeded in establishing the principle of the juridical equality of all the states, even the smallest, and in having Luxembourg being directly represented in the institutions of the ECSC, namely the High Authority and the Common Assembly.

== Domestic policy ==
Luxembourg's participation in international military alliances meant that it had to abandon its neutrality, and would have to revise its Constitution. The Chamber elected in 1945 had received the task of modifying several constitutional articles. The changes were voted through the parliament under the Dupong-Schaus government. The words "perpetually neutral" were struck from the first article. In addition, the constitutional revision of 1948 defined Luxembourg as a "parliamentary democracy", underlined the importance of free trade and freedom of industry, protected union rights, stipulated that the law guaranteed the right to work and organised social security.

In the coalition, Pierre Dupong and the Christian Social People's Party put emphasis on family policy by developing benefits for families. The law of 20 October 1947 created the first legal basis for family allowances for all workers. In addition, the government created the birth allowance.

During the post-war period, a broad consensus existed around the principle of national solidarity: those who had remained unharmed should help those who had suffered in the war. This principle of solidarity also guided the government in its policy of reconstruction. On 16 April 1947, the Prime Minister pledged before the Chamber that war damages would be fully compensated. War damages were estimated at 11,1 billion francs.

Although the government managed to obtain protection clauses for Luxembourgish agriculture in the negotiations for the Benelux agreements and for the General Agreement on Tariffs and Trade (GATT), there was a conflict between the Ministry of Agriculture and the Farmers' Central (Centrale paysanne). Created after the war, the latter had taken over the functions of the Chamber of Agriculture and had turned itself into a powerful union containing the vast majority of farmers. Under the leadership of its general secretary Mathias Berns, the Farmers' Central wanted to change Luxembourgish farming policy.

== Ministers ==
=== 1 March 1947 – 14 July 1948 ===
Name	Party	Office
Pierre Dupong	CSV	Prime Minister; Minister for Finances; Minister for Work, Social Security Provision, and Mines; Minister for Social Assistance
Joseph Bech	CSV	Minister for Foreign Affairs and Foreign Trade; Minister for Viticulture
Nicolas Margue	CSV	Minister for National Education; Minister for Religion, the Arts, and Science; Minister for Agriculture
Eugène Schaus	GD	Minister for Justice; Minister for the Interior
Lambert Schaus	CSV	Minister for Economic Affairs; Minister for the Armed Forces
Alphonse Osch	GD	Minister for Public Health; Minister for War Damage
Robert Schaffner	GD	Minister for Public Works; Minister for Transport
Source: Service Information et Presse

=== 14 July 1948 – 3 July 1951 ===
Name	Portrait	Party	Office
Pierre Dupong		CSV	Prime Minister; Minister for Finances; Minister for Work, Social Security Provision, and Mines; Minister for the Armed Forces
Joseph Bech		CSV	Minister for Foreign Affairs and Foreign Trade; Minister for Viticulture
Eugène Schaus		GD	Minister for Justice; Minister for the Interior
Alphonse Osch		GD	Minister for Public Health; Minister for War Damage
Robert Schaffner		GD	Minister for Public Works; Minister for Transport; Minister for Reconstruction
Pierre Frieden		CSV	Minister for National Education; Minister for Religion, the Arts, and Science; Minister for Social Assistance
Aloyse Hentgen		CSV	Minister for Economic Affairs; Minister for Agriculture
Source: Service Information et Presse
