= Claude Meisch =

Luxembourgish politician

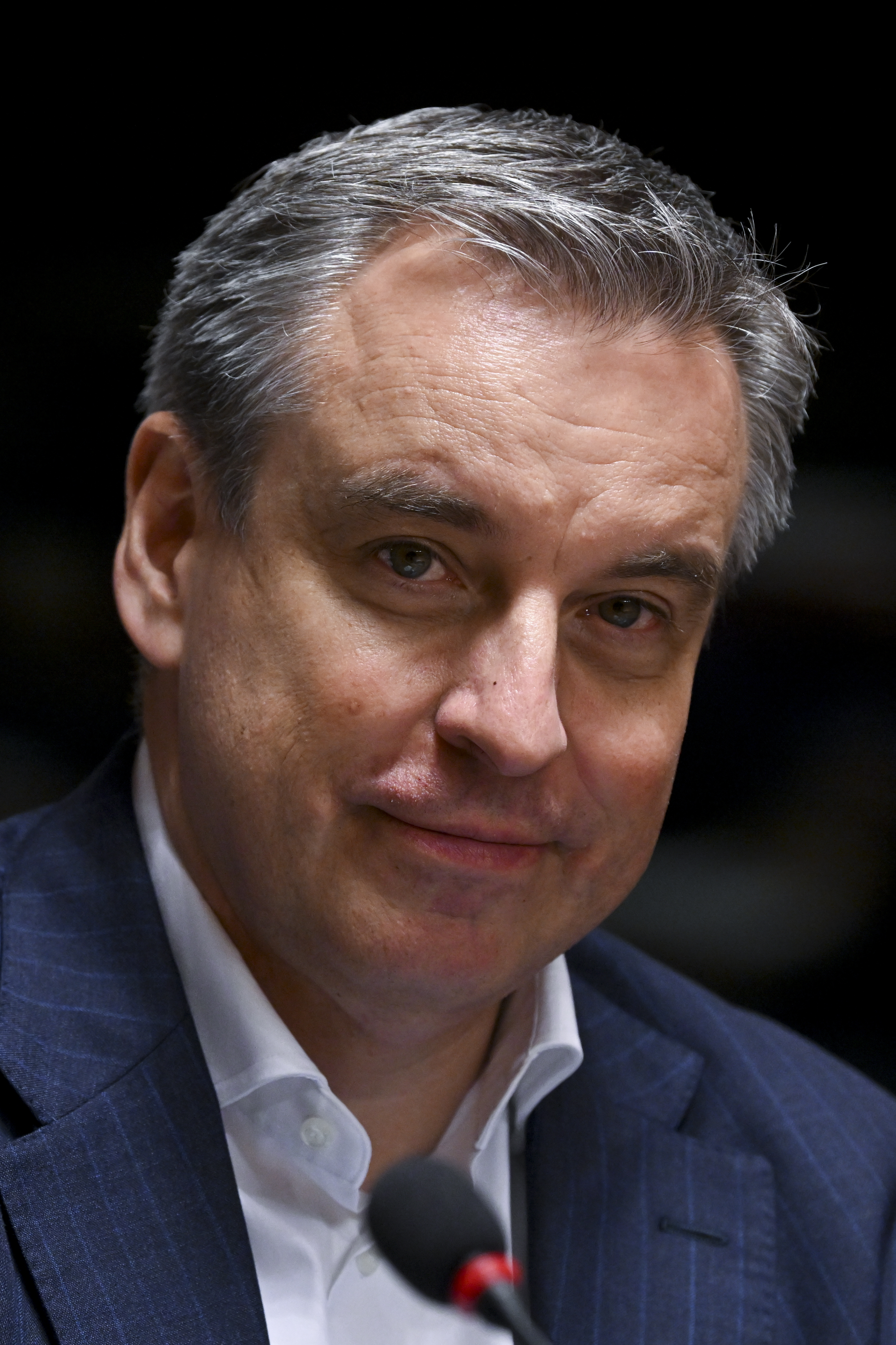
- Meisch in 2024

Minister of Housing and Spatial Planning
- Incumbent
- Assumed office 17 November 2023
- Prime Minister: Luc Frieden
- Government: Frieden-Bettel
- Preceded by: Henri Kox (Housing); Claude Turmes (Spatial Planning)

Minister of National Education, Children and Youth
- Incumbent
- Assumed office 4 December 2013
- Prime Minister: Xavier Bettel; Luc Frieden
- Government: Frieden-Bettel; Bettel I and II
- Preceded by: Mady Delvaux-Stehres

Minister of Research and Higher Education
- In office 4 December 2013 – 17 November 2023
- Prime Minister: Xavier Bettel
- Government: Bettel I and II
- Preceded by: Martine Hansen
- Succeeded by: Stéphanie Obertin

Mayor of Differdange
- In office 31 January 2002 – 4 December 2013

Member of the Chamber of Deputies
- In office 12 August 1999 – 4 December 2013
- Constituency: South

Personal details
- Born: 27 November 1971 (age 54) Pétange, Luxembourg
- Party: Democratic Party (since 1994)
- Education: Trier University
- Profession: Politician

Claude Meisch (born 27 November 1971) is a Luxembourgish politician who has served as Minister of Education since 2013 in the successive governments of Xavier Bettel and Luc Frieden. He was a member of the Chamber of Deputies from 1999 to 2013 and Mayor of Differdange from 2002 to 2013. A member of the Democratic Party (DP) since 1994, he was the party's president from 2004 to 2013.

== Early life and education ==
Born in Pétange, in the south-west of the country, Meisch attended the town's Lycée technique Mathias-Adam, before studying financial mathematics at the University of Trier. After graduating, he worked for the private Banque de Luxembourg. Meisch was vice-president of the Democratic and Liberal Youth, the DP's youth wing, from 1995 until 2000.

== Political career ==
Meisch ran for the Chamber of Deputies, to represent the South Constituency, in the 1999 general election. He finished sixth amongst DP candidates, with the top four being elected. However, the election saw the DP become kingmakers, giving them enough leverage over the Christian Social People's Party (CSV) to allow them to appoint seven Democratic deputies, including Henri Grethen and Eugène Berger, to the new government. Grethen insisted that Berger be appointed along with him, specifically so that Meisch could enter the Chamber. With Grethen and Berger required to vacate their seats to take up their government positions, Meisch filled in the gap and entered the Chamber of Deputies on 12 August 1999.

In the 2004 general election, Meisch was re-elected to the Chamber directly, placing second amongst DP candidates in an election that saw the party's representation from the South reduced from four to two. The result was bad for the DP across the country, losing five seats and seeing them replaced as the Christian Social People's Party's (CSV) coalition partners by the LSAP. After the election, Lydie Polfer resigned as party president, having served the term limit imposed by the party's statutes. Meisch was the only candidate put forward to replace her, and recorded a 90% vote in his favour (between him and none of the above), becoming president of the DP on 10 October 2004.

The 2005 election to the Differdange communal council saw Meisch score an 'historic' victory, in leading the DP to buck the national trend and greatly increase their vote: winning 43% of the vote and winning eight seats. Meisch thus remained as mayor, heading a coalition with the Greens, although the size of the victory allowed Meisch to choose his coalition partner from any of the other three parties.

In the 2009 general election, Meisch was re-elected to the Chamber, winning more votes that any other Democratic candidate in the entire country, and winning more than twice as many votes as Eugène Berger, who placed second on the DP list in the South. Nationwide, the party lost 1.1% of its vote share and fell down to 9 seats. Immediately after the election, Meisch ruled out a coalition with the CSV, so the DP continued in opposition.

=== Minister of Education ===
In 2020, Meisch was at the centre of controversy when, as Minister of Education, he forced the Luxembourgish public schools to reopen in the midst of the COVID-19 pandemic despite protests from the teachers union (SNE) and an online petition from 23,000 concerned parents urging him not to do so. A spokesperson for the Ministry of Education stated that "parents have no say in the matter".

In July 2021, in response to the effects of stress and emotional insecurity caused by the COVID pandemic, Claude Meisch as Minister of National Education, Children and Youth, inaugurated the Achtsamkeitspfad open-air mindfulness trail at the Munsbach Castle, designed and created by the Center for Social-Emotional Development (CDSE) to reinforce psychic balance, the first meditation concept of its kind in the Grand Duchy of Luxembourg. Claude Meisch congratulated the CDSE for their initiative to promote awareness of emotional skills and well-being, and thanked the commune of Schuttrange for their support.

In 2023 he was appointed Minister of Education, Children and Youth and as Minister of Housing and Spatial Planning in the government of Luc Frieden.

== Footnotes ==
Political offices
Preceded by Marcel Blau	Mayor of Differdange; 2002 – 2013	Succeeded by Roberto Traversini
Preceded by Mady Delvaux-Stehres	Minister for National Education; 2013 – Present	Succeeded by Present
Preceded by Martine Hansen	Minister for Higher Education and Research; 2013 – Present	Succeeded by Present
Preceded by -	Minister for Children and Youth; 2013 – Present	Succeeded by Present
Party political offices
Preceded by Lydie Polfer	President of the DP; 2004 – 2013	Succeeded by Xavier Bettel
