= Eugène Schaus =

The Honourable Eugène Schaus
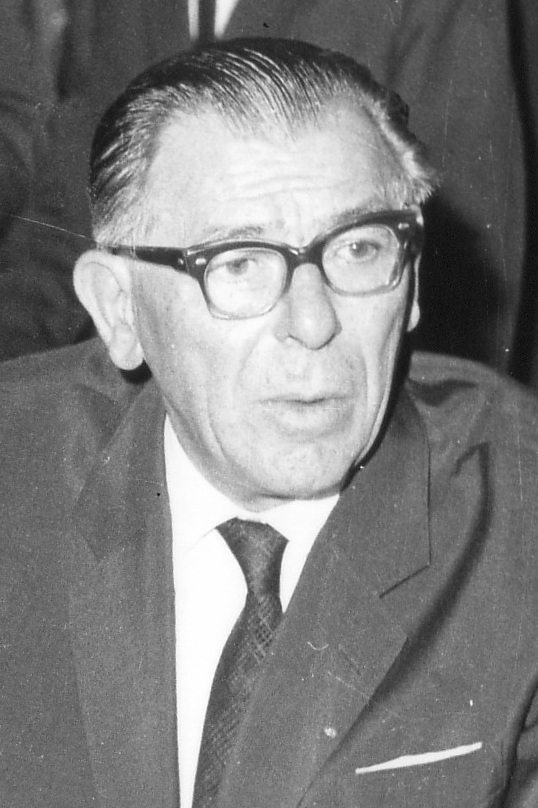
- Schaus in 1963

Deputy Prime Minister of Luxembourg
- In office 6 February 1969 – 15 June 1974
- Prime Minister: Pierre Werner
- Government: Werner-Schaus II
- Preceded by: Henry Cravatte
- Succeeded by: Raymond Vouel
- In office 2 March 1959 – 15 July 1964
- Prime Minister: Pierre Werner
- Government: Werner-Schaus I
- Preceded by: Position established
- Succeeded by: Henry Cravatte

Minister for the Interior
- In office 6 February 1969 – 15 June 1974
- Prime Minister: Pierre Werner
- Government: Werner-Schaus II
- Preceded by: Henry Cravatte
- Succeeded by: Jos Wohlfart
- In office 14 November 1945 – 3 July 1951
- Prime Minister: Pierre Dupong
- Government: National Union; Dupong-Schaus
- Preceded by: Robert Als
- Succeeded by: Pierre Frieden

Minister for Justice
- In office 6 February 1969 – 15 June 1974
- Prime Minister: Pierre Werner
- Government: Werner-Schaus II
- Preceded by: Jean Dupong
- Succeeded by: Robert Krieps
- In office 1 March 1947 – 3 July 1951
- Prime Minister: Pierre Dupong
- Government: Dupong-Schaus
- Preceded by: Victor Bodson
- Succeeded by: Victor Bodson

Minister for Foreign Affairs
- In office 2 March 1959 – 15 July 1964
- Prime Minister: Pierre Werner
- Government: Werner-Schaus I
- Preceded by: Joseph Bech
- Succeeded by: Pierre Werner

Personal details
- Born: 12 May 1901 Gonderange, Luxembourg
- Died: 29 March 1978 (aged 76) Luxembourg City, Luxembourg
- Party: Democratic Party (1955-1978)

Eugène Schaus (12 May 1901 – 29 March 1978) was a Luxembourgish politician and jurist. Schaus was a key figure in the early days of the Democratic Party, of which he was president from 1952 until 1959.

Schaus held office in a number of governments, under Pierre Dupong and Pierre Werner, over a period of thirty years. He served as the Deputy Prime Minister, a position created especially for Schaus, in Werner's first government. He would serve in this capacity again (1969–1974), as well as holding a number of other high offices.

== Career ==
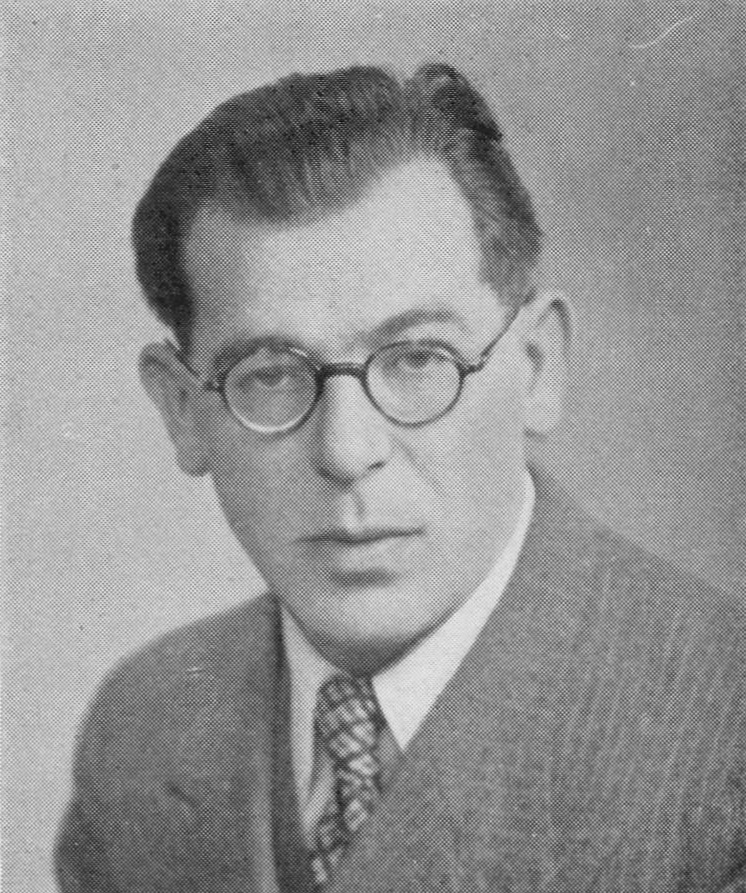
Schaus in 1945

An experienced lawyer, Schaus was elected to the Chamber of Deputies in 1937, in which he served until 1940, when the country was occupied by Nazi Germany and the Chamber was suspended. Having refused to swear allegiance to the occupying forces, Schaus, his wife and their three children spent most of the war in German deportation camps in Eastern Europe, and returned only at the end of the war. He was the Group for Patriotism and Democracy member of the National Union Government, as Minister for the Interior, and was elected at the next election, in 1945.

Schaus was recognised as the foremost liberal politician in 1947 by his inclusion in the Christian Social People's Party-Democratic Group coalition under Pierre Dupong, adding the position of Minister for Justice to that for the Interior. Due to his leadership of the GD into this government, it is known as the Dupong-Schaus Government. In 1951, the CSV formed a coalition with the Luxembourg Socialist Workers' Party, ejecting Schaus from government. The following year, Schaus was elected president of the Democratic Party, succeeding Lucien Dury.

In 1958, a scandal over government corruption allowed Schaus, as opposition leader, to lever himself, and the party (by now renamed the Democratic Party) back into government. Schaus alleged that the government had been offered a bribe by a contractor; whilst refusing it and eliminating the company from the list of bidders, the attempted bribe was not reported within the required window, and the government collapsed. In the general election held the following year, the Democratic Party almost doubled its share of seats, and replaced the LSAP in the governing coalition that was formed after the election and the death of prime minister Pierre Frieden.
