= Anne Kremer =

Luxembourgish tennis player

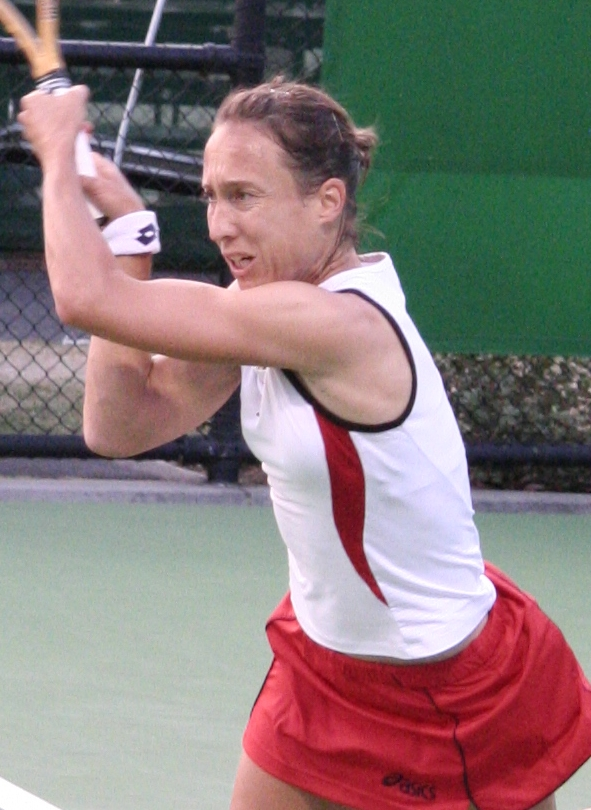
- Kremer in 2007
- Country (sports): Luxembourg
- Born: 17 October 1975 (age 50) Luxembourg City
- Height: 1.65 m (5 ft 5 in)
- Turned pro: September 1998
- Retired: August 2014
- Plays: Right-handed (two-handed backhand)
- Prize money: $1,567,313

Singles
- Career record: 496–418
- Career titles: 2 WTA, 5 ITF
- Highest ranking: No. 18 (29 July 2002)

Grand Slam singles results
- Australian Open: 2R (1999, 2001, 2002, 2003, 2007, 2008)
- French Open: 3R (2002)
- Wimbledon: 3R (1999, 2004)
- US Open: 2R (1998, 1999, 2000)

Doubles
- Career record: 45–108
- Career titles: 1 ITF
- Highest ranking: No. 140 (6 May 2002)

Grand Slam doubles results
- Australian Open: 1R (2005, 2008)
- French Open: 1R (2005)
- Wimbledon: 1R (2005)

Team competitions
- Fed Cup: 61–57

Anne Kremer (born 17 October 1975) is a Luxembourgish retired tennis player. She won two singles titles on the WTA Tour. On 29 July 2002, she achieved her best WTA ranking of world No. 18.

Kremer completed her schooling at the Athénée de Luxembourg and subsequently studied English and history at Stanford University in California.

Kremer is a member of the Democratic and Liberal Youth in Luxembourg, and has entered politics. She ran for the Democratic Party in the 2009 election to the Chamber of Deputies of Luxembourg. Running in Centre, she finished 15th on the DP list, and was thus not elected.

== Biography ==
Kremer was born in 1975 to father Jean (an engineer), and mother Ginette (a physical education teacher). Early in her career, Kremer was coached by her younger brother, Gilles. Later, she was coached by Stephane Vix. Kremer is a baseliner right-handed player with a strong backhand and a preference for grass and hard pack playing surfaces. Beside Luxembourgish, Kremer is fluent in English, French and German and plans to become a translator.

== WTA career finals ==
=== Singles: 4 (2 titles, 2 runner-ups) ===
Legend
Grand Slam tournaments (0–0)
Tier I (0–0)
Tier II (0–0)
Tier III (0–0)
Tier IV & V (2–2)

Result	No.	Date	Tournament	Surface	Opponent	Score
Loss	1.	Nov 1999	Pattaya, Thailand	Hard	(Bulgaria) Magdalena Maleeva	6–4, 1–6, 2–6
Win	1.	Jan 2000	Auckland, New Zealand	Hard	(Zimbabwe) Cara Black	6–4, 6–4
Win	2.	Nov 2000	Pattaya, Thailand	Hard	(Russia) Tatiana Panova	6–1, 6–4
Loss	2.	Apr 2001	Budapest, Hungary	Clay	(Bulgaria) Magdalena Maleeva	6–3, 2–6, 4–6

== ITF Circuit finals ==
$100,000 tournaments
$75,000 tournaments
$50,000 tournaments
$25,000 tournaments
$10,000 tournaments

=== Singles: 12 (5–7) ===
Outcome	No.	Date	Tournament	Surface	Opponent	Score
Runner-up	1.	23 May 1994	ITF Łódź, Poland	Clay	(Ukraine) Talina Beiko	4–6, 2–6
Winner	1.	31 July 1994	ITF La Coruña, Spain	Clay	(Spain) Paula Hermida	7–5, 6–1
Winner	2.	21 August 1994	ITF Koksijde, Belgium	Clay	(Belgium) Stephanie Devillé	6–1, 6–4
Winner	3.	11 September 1994	ITF Varna, Bulgaria	Clay	(Belarus) Marina Stets	6–7, 7–6, 6–1
Runner-up	2.	20 July 1998	ITF Peachtree, United States	Hard	(Puerto Rico) Kristina Brandi	3–6, 3–6
Winner	4.	11 October 1998	ITF Albuquerque, United States	Hard	(United States) Jane Chi	2–6, 6–4, 6–4
Runner-up	3.	19 October 1998	ITF Welwyn, United Kingdom	Carpet (i)	(Switzerland) Emmanuelle Gagliardi	1–6, 1–1 ret.
Winner	5.	21 February 1999	ITF Midland, United States	Hard (i)	(United States) Tara Snyder	3–6, 6–1, 7–5
Runner-up	4.	1 March 1999	ITF Dubai, United Arab Emirates	Hard	(Slovenia) Katarina Srebotnik	1–6, 1–6
Runner-up	5.	10 May 2004	ITF Stockholm, Sweden	Clay	(Australia) Anastasia Rodionova	6–7, 4–6
Runner-up	6.	24 January 2010	ITF Wrexham, United Kingdom	Hard (i)	(Germany) Mona Barthel	1–6, 1–6
Runner-up	7.	25 September 2010	ITF Shrewsbury, United Kingdom	Hard (i)	(Czech Republic) Eva Birnerová	6–7, 6–3, 0–6

=== Doubles: 1 (1–0) ===
Outcome	No.	Date	Tournament	Surface	Partner	Opponents	Score
Winner	1.	25 March 2011	ITF Bath, United Kingdom	Hard (i)	(Hungary) Tímea Babos	(Poland) Marta Domachowska (Poland) Katarzyna Piter	7–6^{(7–5)}, 6–2

== Grand Slam singles performance timeline ==
Key
W	F	SF	QF	#R	RR	Q#	DNQ	A	NH

(W) winner; (F) finalist; (SF) semifinalist; (QF) quarterfinalist; (#R) rounds 4, 3, 2, 1; (RR) round-robin stage; (Q#) qualification round; (DNQ) did not qualify; (A) absent; (NH) not held; (SR) strike rate (events won / competed); (W–L) win–loss record.

Tournament	1996	1997	1998	1999	2000	2001	2002	2003	2004	2005	2006	2007	2008	2009	2010	2011	2012	2013	W-L
Australian Open	A	1R	Q2	2R	1R	2R	2R	2R	A	1R	Q1	2R	2R	A	A	1R	A	A	6–10
French Open	Q2	Q1	A	2R	2R	2R	3R	A	A	1R	Q2	1R	1R	A	A	Q1	A	A	5–7
Wimbledon	1R	1R	Q3	3R	1R	1R	2R	A	3R	2R	A	1R	A	A	A	Q1	A	A	6–9
US Open	Q1	Q3	2R	2R	2R	1R	1R	A	Q2	1R	Q2	Q3	A	Q1	Q2	Q1	A	A	3–6
Win–loss	0–1	0–2	1–1	5–4	2–4	2–4	4–4	1–1	2–1	1–4	0–0	1–3	1–2	0–0	0–0	0–1	0–0	0–0	20–32
Year-end ranking	134	129	74	31	35	33	25	389	94	166	142	85	264	559	165	254	496	986	

=== Head-to-head record ===
- Serena Williams 0–1
- Anke Huber 1–3
- Martina Hingis 0–1
- Maria Sharapova 0–2
- Lindsay Davenport 0–5
- Henrieta Nagyová 2–0
- Elena Dementieva 0–2
- Venus Williams 0–3
- Dinara Safina 0–1
