= 2005 Luxembourg communal elections =

The 2005 Luxembourgish communal elections were held on 9 October 2005. Elections are held every six years across all of Luxembourg's then-118 communes.

== Results ==
Seven lists ran in more than one commune: the Christian Social People's Party (CSV), the Luxembourg Socialist Workers' Party (LSAP), the Democratic Party (DP), the Greens, the Alternative Democratic Reform Party (ADR), the Left, and the Communist Party of Luxembourg (KPL). Of these, the six former parties won seats, as did four local parties that ran in only one commune each.

In the chart below, '-' represents that the party did not run in that commune, whereas '0' represents that the party did run, but won no council seats. Grey denotes the mayor's party. Results for communes using proportional representation only. The party system does not apply in the majoritarian communes, making comparisons difficult.

| Commune | CSV | LSAP | DP | Greens | ADR | Left | KPL | Other | Total |
|---|---|---|---|---|---|---|---|---|---|
| Bascharage (Council) | 5 | 5 | 1 | 1 | 0 | - | - | 1 | 13 |
| Bertrange (Council) | 3 | 1 | 6 | 1 | - | - | - | - | 11 |
| Bettembourg (Council) | 3 | 8 | 1 | 1 | - | - | - | - | 13 |
| Contern (Council) | 3 | 4 | 4 | - | - | - | - | - | 11 |
| Diekirch (Council) | 5 | 5 | 1 | 2 | - | - | - | - | 13 |
| Differdange (Council) | 3 | 4 | 8 | 2 | 0 | - | 0 | - | 17 |
| Dippach (Council) | 5 | 4 | 2 | - | 0 | - | - | - | 11 |
| Dudelange (Council) | 4 | 11 | 0 | 2 | 0 | - | - | - | 17 |
| Echternach (Council) | 4 | 4 | 3 | - | - | - | - | 0 | 11 |
| Esch-sur-Alzette (Council) | 5 | 9 | 1 | 2 | 1 | 1 | 0 | - | 19 |
| Ettelbruck (Council) | 6 | 5 | 1 | 1 | 0 | - | - | - | 13 |
| Grevenmacher (Council) | 4 | 2 | 4 | 1 | - | - | - | - | 11 |
| Hesperange (Council) | 6 | 2 | 4 | 3 | - | - | - | - | 15 |
| Junglinster (Council) | 4 | 2 | 3 | 2 | 0 | - | - | - | 11 |
| Kayl (Council) | 3 | 8 | 2 | - | - | - | - | - | 13 |
| Kehlen (Council) | 5 | 4 | 2 | - | - | - | - | - | 11 |
| Kopstal (Council) | 2 | - | 3 | 2 | - | - | - | 4 | 11 |
| Luxembourg (Council) | 6 | 4 | 11 | 5 | 1 | 0 | 0 | 0 | 27 |
| Mamer (Council) | 6 | 3 | 2 | 2 | - | - | - | - | 13 |
| Mersch (Council) | 4 | 2 | 4 | 3 | - | - | - | - | 13 |
| Mertert (Council) | 4 | 5 | 2 | - | - | - | - | - | 11 |
| Mondercange (Council) | 4 | 5 | 2 | 1 | 1 | - | - | - | 13 |
| Mondorf-les-Bains (Council) | 3 | 3 | 5 | - | - | - | - | - | 11 |
| Niederanven (Council) | 5 | 3 | 2 | 1 | - | - | - | - | 11 |
| Pétange (Council) | 7 | 6 | 1 | 1 | 0 | - | - | - | 15 |
| Rambrouch (Council) | 4 | 1 | 1 | - | - | - | - | 5 | 11 |
| Rumelange (Council) | 3 | 8 | - | 0 | - | - | 0 | - | 11 |
| Sanem (Council) | 5 | 5 | 1 | 3 | 1 | 0 | 0 | - | 15 |
| Schifflange (Council) | 4 | 7 | 1 | 1 | 0 | - | - | - | 13 |
| Schuttrange (Council) | 3 | 3 | 3 | - | - | - | - | 2 | 11 |
| Steinfort (Council) | 4 | 6 | 1 | - | - | - | - | 0 | 11 |
| Steinsel (Council) | 2 | 6 | 3 | - | - | - | - | - | 11 |
| Strassen (Council) | 3 | 2 | 4 | 2 | - | - | - | - | 11 |
| Walferdange (Council) | 4 | 3 | 4 | 2 | - | - | - | - | 13 |
| Wiltz (Council) | 3 | 6 | 2 | - | - | - | - | 0 | 11 |
| Wincrange (Council) | 5 | 1 | 4 | 0 | 1 | - | - | - | 11 |
| Councillors | 149 | 157 | 99 | 41 | 5 | 1 | 0 | 12 | 464 |
| Mayors | 13 | 15 | 7 | 0 | 0 | 0 | 0 | 1 | 36 |
Source: Ministry of the Interior
