= 1979 European Parliament election in Luxembourg =

- 7–10 June 1979

6 seats in the European Parliament

The 1979 European Parliament election in Luxembourg was the election of the delegation from Luxembourg to the European Parliament on 10 June 1979. It was held on the same day as the legislative elections, which elected members to Luxembourg's Chamber of Deputies.

== Results ==
Party	Votes	%	Seats
Christian Social People's Party	352,296	36.13	3
Democratic Party	274,307	28.13	2
Luxembourg Socialist Workers' Party	211,106	21.65	1
Social Democratic Party	68,289	7.00	0
Communist Party of Luxembourg	48,813	5.01	0
Alternative List	9,485	0.97	0
Liberal Party	5,610	0.58	0
Revolutionary Socialist Party	5,085	0.52	0
Total	974,991	100.00	6
Valid votes	170,759	90.28	
Invalid/blank votes	18,382	9.72	
Total votes	189,141	100.00	
Registered voters/turnout	212,740	88.91	
Source: Public.lu
