= 1951 Luxembourg general election =

- 3 June 1951
- 26 of the 52 seats in the Chamber of Deputies; 27 seats needed for a majority
| Party | Leader | Vote % | Seats | +/– |
|---|---|---|---|---|
| CSV | Pierre Dupong | 40.57 | 21 | −1 |
| LSAP | Victor Bodson | 35.48 | 19 | +4 |
| PDG | Lucien Dury | 20.55 | 8 | −1 |
| KPL | Dominique Urbany | 3.40 | 4 | −1 |
This lists parties that won seats. See the complete results below.
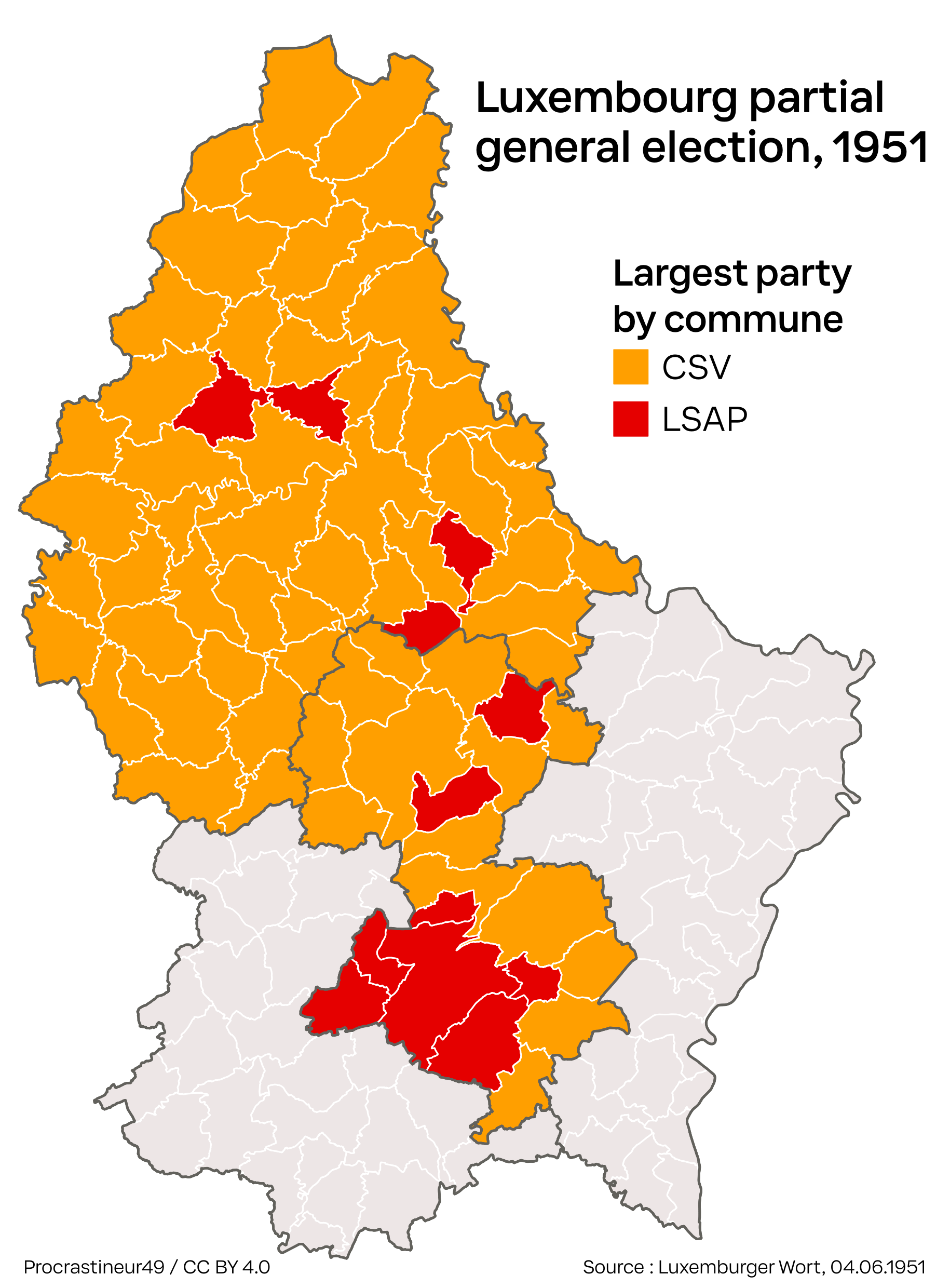
Results by commune
| Prime Minister before | Prime Minister after |
|---|---|
| Pierre Dupong; CSV | Pierre Dupong; CSV |

Partial general elections were held in Luxembourg on 3 June 1951, electing 26 of the 52 seats in the Chamber of Deputies in the North and Centre constituencies of the country. The Christian Social People's Party (CSV) won 12 of the 26 seats, but saw its total number of seats fall from 22 to 21. The elections led to the formation of the coalition Dupong-Bodson Ministry between the CSV and the Luxembourg Socialist Workers' Party (LSAP).

== Results ==
| Party | Votes | % | Seats | | | |
| Party | Votes | % | Not up | Elected | Total | +/– |
|---|---|---|---|---|---|---|
| Christian Social People's Party | 425,545 | 40.57 | 9 | 12 | 21 | –1 |
| Luxembourg Socialist Workers' Party | 372,177 | 35.48 | 10 | 9 | 19 | +4 |
| Patriotic and Democratic Group | 215,511 | 20.55 | 3 | 5 | 8 | –1 |
| Communist Party of Luxembourg | 35,662 | 3.40 | 4 | 0 | 4 | –1 |
| Total | 1,048,895 | 100.00 | 26 | 26 | 52 | +1 |
| Valid votes | 79,662 | 95.27 | | | | |
| Invalid/blank votes | 3,951 | 4.73 | | | | |
| Total votes | 83,613 | 100.00 | | | | |
| Registered voters/turnout | 92,110 | 90.78 | | | | |
Source: Luxemburger Wort
