= 1948 Luxembourg general election =

- 6 June 1948
- 26 out of 51 seats in the Chamber of Deputies; 26 seats needed for a majority
Party	Leader	Vote %	Seats	+/–
LSAP	Michel Rasquin	41.46	15	+4
CSV	Émile Reuter	33.30	22	−3
KPL		16.86	5	0
PDG	Lucien Dury	8.38	9	0
This lists parties that won seats. See the complete results below.
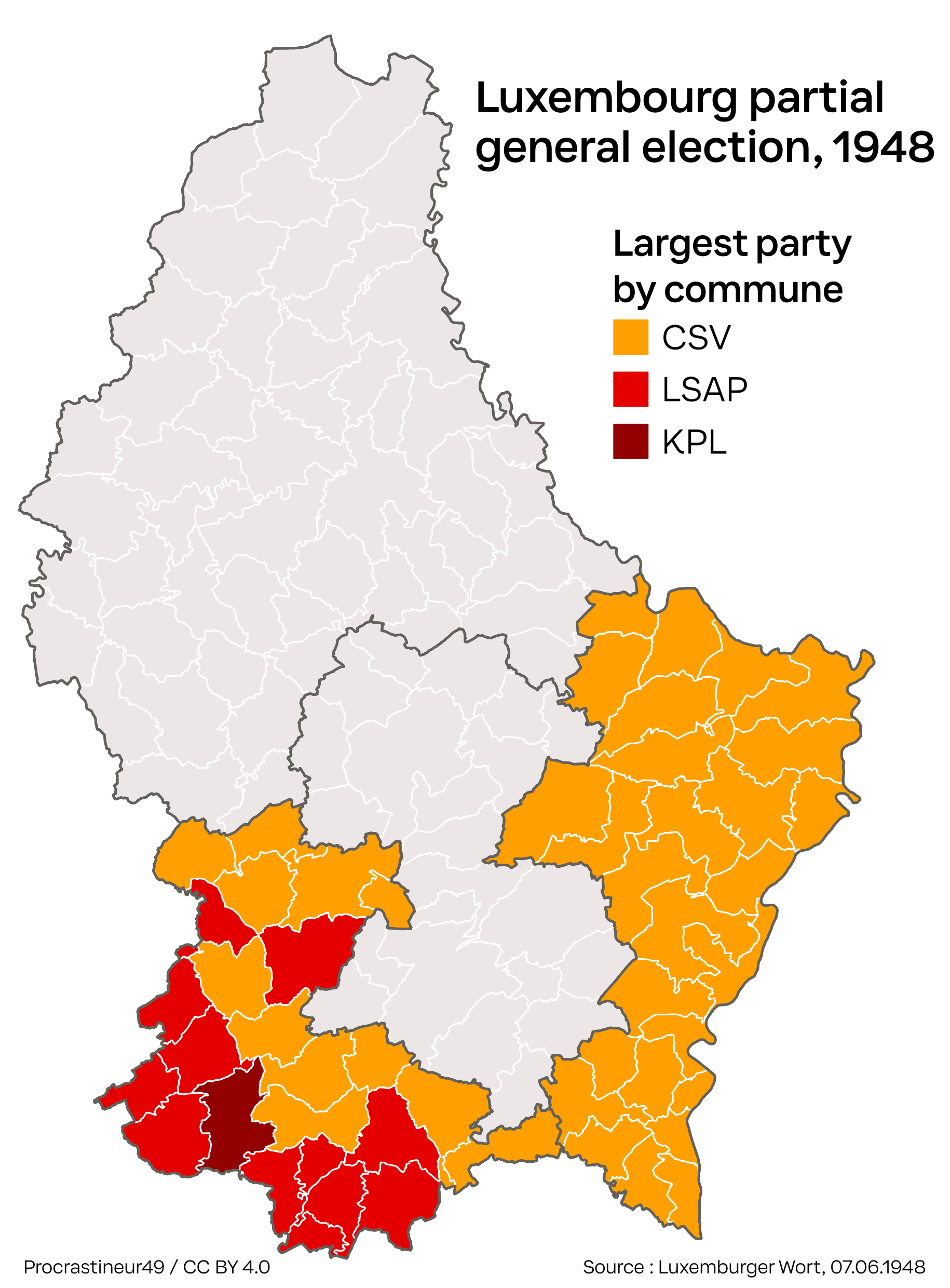
Results by commune
Prime Minister before	Prime Minister after
Pierre Dupong; CSV	Pierre Dupong; CSV

Partial general elections were held in Luxembourg on 6 June 1948, electing 26 of the 51 seats in the Chamber of Deputies in the centre and north of the country. The Christian Social People's Party won 9 of the 26 seats, reducing its total number of seats from 25 to 22.

== Results ==
Party	Votes	%	Seats			
Party	Votes	%	Not up	Elected	Total	+/–
Luxembourg Socialist Workers' Party	481,755	41.46	5	10	15	+4
Christian Social People's Party	386,972	33.30	13	9	22	–3
Communist Party of Luxembourg	195,956	16.86	1	4	5	0
Patriotic and Democratic Group	97,415	8.38	6	3	9	0
Total	1,162,098	100.00	25	26	51	0
Valid votes	73,674	94.58				
Invalid/blank votes	4,221	5.42				
Total votes	77,895	100.00				
Registered voters/turnout	84,724	91.94				
Source: Nohlen & Stöver
