= Liberalism in Luxembourg =

This article gives an overview of liberalism in Luxembourg. While liberal thought has had a long history within Luxembourg, organized political liberalism has only been since 1904 when the Liberal League was formed. It wasn't until 1925 that a liberal party became relevant, and since then, a liberal party has been one of the three major political forces in the Grand-Duchy. It is limited to liberal parties with substantial support, mainly proved by having had a representation in parliament. The sign ⇒ denotes another party in that scheme. Not all parties listed have the word "liberal" in their names.

== History ==
Each of the following sections describes an element of Luxembourg's liberalism, beginning with the 20th century. The Democratic Party (Demokratesch Partei/Parti Démocratique, member LI, ALDE) is the traditional liberal party.

=== From Liberal League to Radical Liberal Party ===
- 1904: The Luxembourgian liberals organised themselves in the Liberal League (Ligue Libérale)
- 1925: The Liberal League fell apart in the Radical Socialist Party (Parti Radical-Socialiste), the ⇒ Radical Party (1928) and the ⇒ Liberal Left
- 1931: The Radical-Socialist-affiliated Progressive Democratic Party of the North (Parti Démocratique Progressiste du Nord) was established.
- 1934: The liberal parties re-united into the Radical Liberal Party (Parti Radical-Libérale)
- 1937: The PDPN is renamed into the Liberal Party (Parti Libéral).
- 1940: The party is banned by Germany
- 1945: A new Liberal Party (Parti Libéral) was founded.
- 1950: The Liberal Party merged into the ⇒ Patriotic and Democratic Group.
- 1974: A new Liberal Party (Parti Libéral) seceded from the ⇒ Democratic Party.
- 1980: The Liberal Party disbanded.

=== Liberal Left ===
- 1925: The Liberal Left (Gauche Libérale) seceded from the ⇒ Liberal League
- 1934: The liberal parties re-united into the ⇒ Radical Liberal Party

=== Radical Party ===
- 1925: The Radical Party (Parti Radical) seceded from the ⇒ Liberal League
- 1934: The liberal parties re-united into the ⇒ Radical Liberal Party

=== From Patriotic and Democratic Group to Democratic Party ===
- 1944: After the liberation liberals and members of resistance groups established the Patriotic and Democratic Group (Groupement Patriotique et Démocratique)
- 1952: The party is renamed into the Democratic Group (Groupement Démocratique)
- 1954: The party is renamed into the Democratic Party (Parti Démocratique or Demokratesch Partei)

== Prominent liberals ==
- Xavier Bettel
- Robert Brasseur
- Paul Eyschen
- Colette Flesch
- Lydie Polfer
- Gaston Thorn

== See also ==
- History of Luxembourg
- Politics of Luxembourg
- List of political parties in Luxembourg
