= 1968 Luxembourg general election =

- 15 December 1968
- 56 seats in the Chamber of Deputies; 29 seats needed for a majority
Party	Leader	Vote %	Seats	+/–
CSV	Pierre Werner	35.27	21	−1
LSAP	Henry Cravatte	32.25	18	−3
DP	Eugène Schaus	16.57	11	+5
KPL	Dominique Urbany	15.50	6	+1
This lists parties that won seats. See the complete results below.
Most voted-for party by municipality and constituency
Prime Minister before	Prime Minister after
Pierre Werner; CSV	Pierre Werner; CSV

General elections were held in Luxembourg on 15 December 1968. The Christian Social People's Party (CSV) remained the largest party, winning 21 of the 56 seats in the Chamber of Deputies.

Following the elections the CSV dropped their previous coalition partners, the Luxembourg Socialist Workers' Party, and formed a new government with the Democratic Party.

== Results ==
Party	Votes	%	Seats	+/–
Christian Social People's Party	915,944	35.27	21	–1
Luxembourg Socialist Workers' Party	837,555	32.25	18	–3
Democratic Party	430,262	16.57	11	+5
Communist Party of Luxembourg	402,610	15.50	6	+1
National Solidarity	10,355	0.40	0	New
Total	2,596,726	100.00	56	0
Valid votes	160,184	93.91		
Invalid/blank votes	10,382	6.09		
Total votes	170,566	100.00		
Registered voters/turnout	192,601	88.56		
Source: Nohlen & Stöver
