= Osch =

Osch and van Osch are surnames. Notable people with these surnames include:

- Alphonse Osch (1909–1997), Luxembourgish politician
- Geoffrey Osch (born 1994), Luxembourgish alpine ski racer
- Henri van Osch (1945–2001), Dutch swimmer
- Kalia Van Osch (born 1993), Canadian curler
- Kesa Van Osch (born 1991), Canadian curler
- Matthieu Osch (born 1999), Luxembourgish alpine ski racer
- Suzzanna van Osch (1942–2008), Indonesian actress
- Ton van Osch (born 1955), Dutch military commander
- Yanick van Osch (born 1997), Dutch footballer
