= National Union Government (1945) =

Government of Luxembourg, 1945–1947

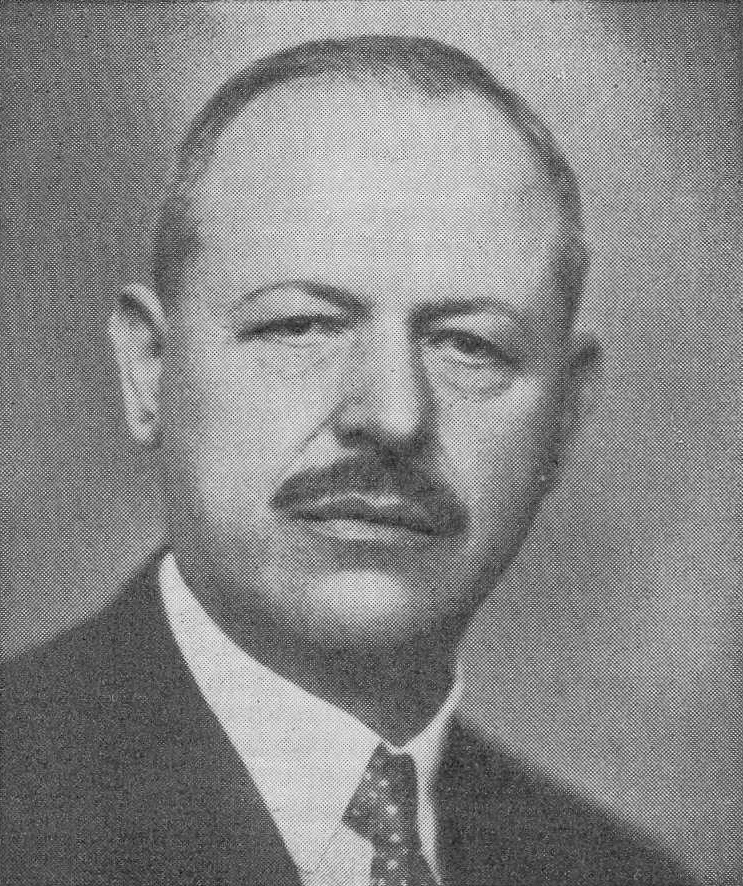
Pierre Dupong, the government's leader, pictured c. 1951

The National Union Government was a form of national government that governed the Grand Duchy of Luxembourg between 14 November 1945 and 13 February 1947, in the direct aftermath of the Second World War. During the war, Luxembourg was invaded, occupied, and annexed by Nazi Germany. Just one of the Luxembourgish casualties of the conflict was the pre-war political system; most of the established parties and alliances disappeared, and some of the leading politicians had lost their lives.

== Background ==
After the liberation of the Grand Duchy in 1944, a temporary government comprising the CSV and the LSAP, dubbed the Liberation Government, took office. No election had been held and no Chamber of Deputies was in place, so there was no need for this government to seek a broad-based legislative coalition.

However, after the war was concluded, Luxembourg returned to political functionality. Legislative elections were held on 21 October 1945, and all four parties won over 5 seats and 10% of the vote each: the CSV, LSAP, GD, and KPL. However, the CSV came just short of an absolute majority, winning 25 seats out of 51.

== Forming the government ==
Atypically, Grand Duchess Charlotte decided to intervene in the political sphere, and asked CSV leader Pierre Dupong (who had been Prime Minister since 1937) to form a broader based coalition than Dupong had organised behind his Liberation Government. On 14 November, Dupong invited all four parties in the Chamber of Deputies to unite in his National Union Government. Dupong also included the only independent candidate in the cabinet. As a result, all 51 Deputies were taking the government whip.

The new government had much work to do, and, with no opposition in the legislature, was capable of instituting any plan, provided that the parties could agree policy between themselves. The departmental briefs were handed to cabinet members based upon personal preference. The composition of the first cabinet was:

Name	Portrait	Party	Office
Pierre Dupong		CSV	Prime Minister; Minister for Finances and the Armed Forces
Joseph Bech		CSV	Minister for Foreign Affairs and Viticulture
Pierre Krier		LSAP	Minister for Employment, Social Security, and Mines
Nicolas Margue		CSV	Minister for Education; Minister for Religion, the Arts, Science, and Agriculture
Victor Bodson		LSAP	Minister for Justice, Transport, and Public Works
Guillaume Konsbruck		Ind.	Minister for Supply and Economic Affairs
Eugène Schaus		GD	Minister for the Interior and War Damage
Charles Marx		KPL	Minister for Social Assistance and Public Health

== Foreign policy ==
The Luxembourg Army occupied the German localities of Bitburg and Saarburg on 11-13 November. The Grand-Duchy's soldiers were sub-occupiers within the French zone of occupation. By participating in the occupation of Germany, Luxembourg's government was not only fulfilling its international obligations, but also pursuing national interests. The occupation was to be the prelude to an annexation in the future. The National Union government was under pressure from the former Luxembourg Resistance, which demanded the de-annexation of the land of the old Duchy of Luxembourg lost after the 1815 Vienna Congress. In 1946 and 1947, Luxembourg's representatives presented a memorandum to the Council of Foreign Ministers, demanding the transfer of a strip of German land 5 to 10 km from the Luxembourgish border. This would give the Grand-Duchy exclusive control of the rivers Our, Sûre and Moselle with a view to hydro-electric infrastructure, as well as control over numerous train lines and roads. These territorial demands were accompanied by economic demands in order to assure the Luxembourgish steel industry's coal supply. However, to the dismay of Luxembourg's nationalist and business circles, the Allies ignored the Grand-Duchy's demands for expansion. Even within the government coalition, the annexationist policy certainly did not enjoy unanimous support.

== Domestic policy ==
Domestically, the government's programme involved nationalising the rail industry, expanding social security, adapting wages to inflation, and universalising family benefits. Economically, the priority was to relaunch agricultural and industrial production. The steel factories had not been much damaged in the war, but securing coal supplies proved difficult. Out of 31 Luxembourgish blast furnaces, only 5 were working in September 1945. Throughout the year 1946, the situation improved. In February 1947, the steel industry reached 80% of the pre-war production level. After the Liberation, the question of the future of Luxembourg's rail network remained. The German occupation authorities had imposed the unification of Luxembourg's network. After the war, France and Belgium expressed their interest in running the Grand Duchy's rail infrastructure. The Luxembourgish government favoured creating a publicly-owned company, majority-owned by the Luxembourgish state. On 17 April 1946, France, Belgium and Luxembourg signed a rail agreement, which entrusted the management of the network to a Luxembourgish company, the Société nationale des chemins de fer luxembourgeois (CFL), in which the Luxembourgish state owned 51% of the shares and the two other countries 24,5% each.

== Tensions ==
With each member virtually free to decide departmental policy by himself, each took it upon himself to push forward his own pet projects. The CSV pushed for the annexation of those Luxembourgish territories lost to Prussia in the Napoleonic Wars. The LSAP ordered the nationalisation of the railways. The KPL sought to create a welfare state. This system of reign by ministerial diktat was not without its draw-backs.

On 2 August 1946, four officers were arrested for allegedly plotting to overthrow the government. Although they were released without charge, it sent a clear message to the government.

Moreover, ideological differences were forcing the government partners apart. The cabinet divided along ideological lines in exactly the manner that the National Union Government was supposed to prevent. Dupong took exception to the LSAP's plans for the railways, whilst the KPL and LSAP attempted to distance themselves from the CSV's irredentism.

Charles Marx died in a car on 13 June 1946 and was replaced by fellow Communist Party member Dominique Urbany eight days later. In addition, on 29 August, the cabinet was reshuffled, with the independent Guillaume Konsbruck replaced by Lambert Schaus, a CSV member. From that date, the cabinet was:

Name	Portrait	Party	Office
Pierre Dupong		CSV	Prime Minister; Minister for Finances and the Armed Forces
Joseph Bech		CSV	Minister for Foreign Affairs and Viticulture
Pierre Krier		LSAP	Minister for Employment, Social Security, and Mines
Nicolas Margue		CSV	Minister for Education; Minister for Religion, the Arts, Science, and Agriculture
Victor Bodson		LSAP	Minister for Justice, Transport, and Public Works
Eugène Schaus		GD	Minister for Interior and War Damage
Lambert Schaus		CSV	Minister for Supply and Economic Affairs
Dominique Urbany		KPL	Minister for Social Assistance and Public Health

=== Gomand trial ===
The Resistance-affiliated newspaper L'Indépendant, edited by Norbert Gomand, had been one of the sharpest critics of the government-in-exile. Finally, the government took the newspaper to court for defamation, in a trial starting in early 1946.

== Collapse ==
The reshuffle, in favour of the CSV, appeased the right-wing dissidents and the two-fifths of the population that had voted the CSV. However, it could not even paper over the cracks of the coalition, and the relationship deteriorated over the winter of 1946-7. On 20 January 1947, Pierre Krier, the leader of the LSAP, died. Unable to hold together the coalition without one of its leading lights, the government resigned on 13 February. Its replacement was another Dupong-led coalition, but including only the CSV and GD. The LSAP would have to wait until 1951 to have another chance at governing.

== See also ==
- Liberation Government (Luxembourg)
- National Union Government (1916)
