= 1989 European Parliament election in Luxembourg =

- 15–18 June 1989

6 seats to the European Parliament

The 1989 European Parliament election in Luxembourg was the election of the delegation from Luxembourg to the European Parliament in 1989.

== Results ==
Party	Votes	%	Seats	+/–
Christian Social People's Party	346,621	34.87	3	0
Luxembourg Socialist Workers' Party	252,920	25.45	2	0
Democratic Party	198,254	19.95	1	0
Green List Ecological Initiative	61,054	6.14	0	New
Communist Party of Luxembourg	46,791	4.71	0	0
The Green Alternative	42,926	4.32	0	0
National Movement	28,867	2.90	0	New
Green Alternative Alliance	8,577	0.86	0	New
RSP Against Racism and Fascism	6,053	0.61	0	New
Why Not?	1,876	0.19	0	New
Total	993,939	100.00	6	0
Valid votes	174,472	91.18		
Invalid/blank votes	16,870	8.82		
Total votes	191,342	100.00		
Registered voters/turnout	218,940	87.39		
Source: Public.lu
