= 1974 Luxembourg general election =

- 26 May 1974
- 59 seats in the Chamber of Deputies; 30 seats needed for a majority
Party	Leader	Vote %	Seats	+/–
LSAP	Raymond Vouel	29.15	17	−1
CSV	Pierre Werner	27.85	18	−3
DP	Gaston Thorn	22.23	14	+3
KPL	René Urbany	10.47	5	−1
PSD	Henry Cravatte	9.20	5	New
This lists parties that won seats. See the complete results below.
Most voted-for party by municipality
Prime Minister before	Prime Minister after
Pierre Werner; CSV	Gaston Thorn; DP

General elections were held in Luxembourg on 26 May 1974. The Christian Social People's Party remained the largest party, winning 18 of the 59 seats in the Chamber of Deputies. However, it went into opposition as the Luxembourg Socialist Workers' Party and Democratic Party formed a coalition government under prime minister Gaston Thorn.

== Results ==
Party	Votes	%	Seats	+/–
Luxembourg Socialist Workers' Party	875,881	29.15	17	–1
Christian Social People's Party	836,990	27.85	18	–3
Democratic Party	668,043	22.23	14	+3
Communist Party of Luxembourg	314,635	10.47	5	–1
Social Democratic Party	276,495	9.20	5	New
Liberal Party	18,502	0.62	0	New
Revolutionary Communist League	14,692	0.49	0	New
Total	3,005,238	100.00	59	+3
Valid votes	175,376	94.53		
Invalid/blank votes	10,151	5.47		
Total votes	185,527	100.00		
Registered voters/turnout	205,817	90.14		
Source: Nohlen & Stöver, Global Elections Database
