= 1945 Luxembourg general election =

- 21 October 1945
- 51 seats in the Chamber of Deputies; 26 seats needed for a majority
Party	Leader	Vote %	Seats
CSV	Émile Reuter	41.41	25
LSAP	Michel Rasquin	25.97	11
PDG		16.74	9
KPL		13.49	5
PIE	Othon Decker	0.64	1
This lists parties that won seats. See the complete results below.
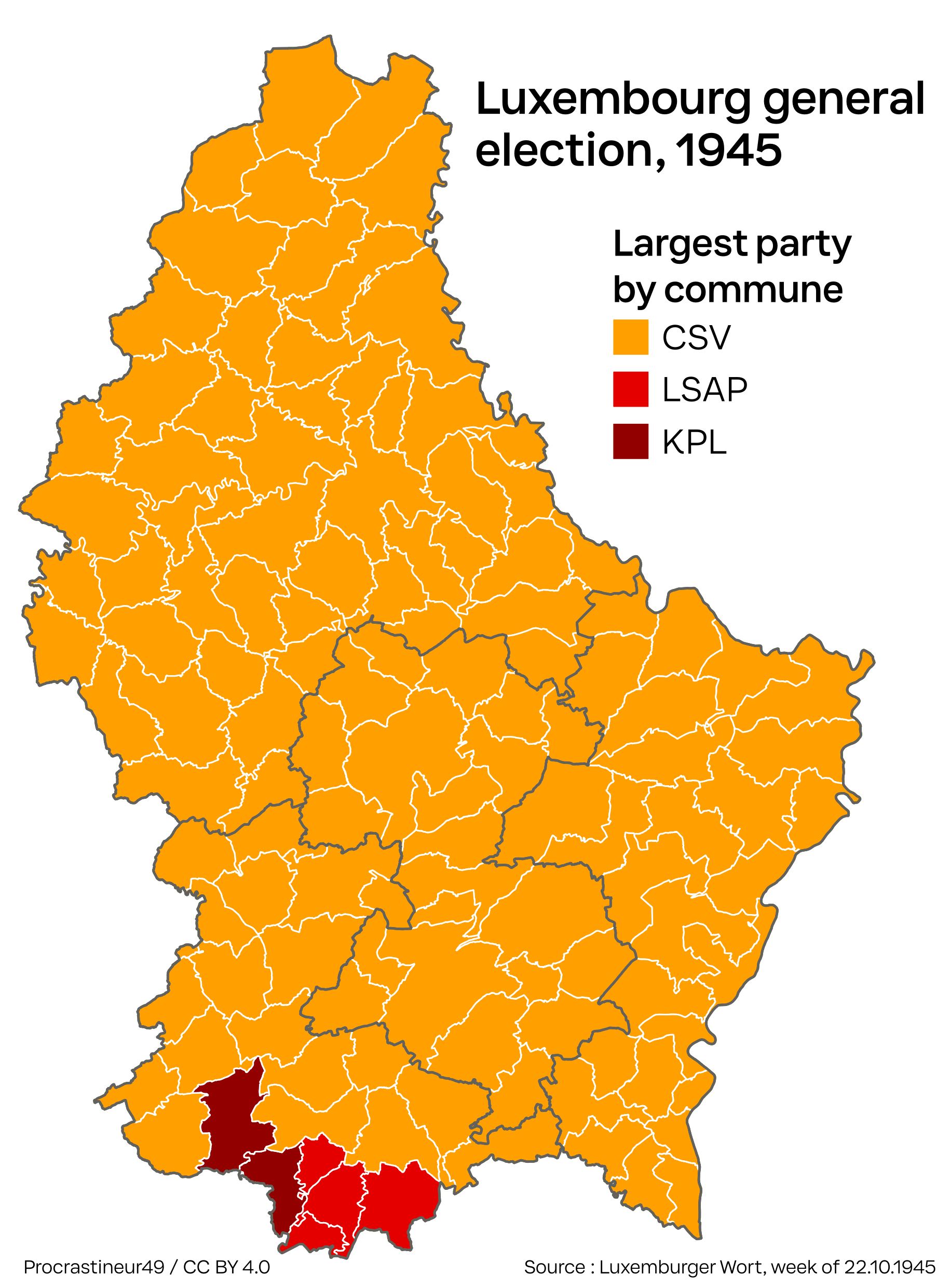
Results by commune
Prime Minister before	Prime Minister after
Pierre Dupong; CSV	Pierre Dupong; CSV

General elections were held in Luxembourg on 21 October 1945. They were the first elections held after the German occupation during World War II. As a result of the war, the political alliances of the interwar period had been ended. In their place were new parties; the Christian Social People's Party, the Luxembourg Socialist Workers' Party, and the Patriotic and Democratic Group in place of the Party of the Right, Socialist Party, and Radical Liberal Party respectively. It is regarded as a realigning election, as the election established the party political order, with four established parties, that would be maintained until 1974.

The conservatives remained the dominant faction, and the Christian Social People's Party's leader, Pierre Dupong, was invited to head another government. The election was also a success for both liberal and communist candidates, with both the Patriotic and Democratic Group and the Communist Party gaining four more seats than in the last election before the war. (Note: Although the Patriotic and Democratic Group was a new party, they won four more than their ideological predecessors, the Radical Liberals, had in 1937.) To restore political stability, Grand Duchess Charlotte asked Dupong to create a more broad-based coalition than the preceding Liberation Government. The resulting National Union Government would embrace all four political parties, and also include the solitary independent, guaranteeing the support of the whole Chamber of Deputies. The government remained in place until 1947.

== Results ==
Party	Votes	%	Seats
Christian Social People's Party	907,601	41.41	25
Luxembourg Socialist Workers' Party	569,025	25.97	11
Patriotic and Democratic Group	366,860	16.74	9
Communist Party of Luxembourg	295,701	13.49	5
Liberal Party	36,321	1.66	0
Party of Independents of the East	13,977	0.64	1
Schummer Party	2,015	0.09	0
Total	2,191,500	100.00	51
Valid votes	153,596	96.55	
Invalid/blank votes	5,487	3.45	
Total votes	159,083	100.00	
Source: Nohlen & Stöver
