= 1959 Luxembourg general election =

- 1 February 1959
- 52 seats in the Chamber of Deputies; 27 seats needed for a majority
| Party | Leader | Vote % | Seats | +/– |
|---|---|---|---|---|
| CSV | Pierre Frieden | 36.91 | 21 | −5 |
| LSAP | Victor Bodson | 34.92 | 17 | 0 |
| DP | Eugène Schaus | 18.45 | 11 | +5 |
| KPL | Dominique Urbany | 9.07 | 3 | 0 |
This lists parties that won seats. See the complete results below.
Most voted-for party by municipality and constituency
| Prime Minister before | Prime Minister after |
|---|---|
| Pierre Frieden; CSV | Pierre Frieden; CSV |

General elections were held in Luxembourg on 1 February 1959. The Christian Social People's Party remained the largest party, winning 21 of the 52 seats in the Chamber of Deputies.

== Results ==
| Party | Votes | % | Seats | +/– |
|---|---|---|---|---|
| Christian Social People's Party | 896,840 | 36.91 | 21 | –5 |
| Luxembourg Socialist Workers' Party | 848,523 | 34.92 | 17 | 0 |
| Democratic Party | 448,387 | 18.45 | 11 | +5 |
| Communist Party of Luxembourg | 220,425 | 9.07 | 3 | 0 |
| National Solidarity | 15,821 | 0.65 | 0 | New |
| Total | 2,429,996 | 100.00 | 52 | 0 |
| Valid votes | 165,596 | 95.26 | | |
| Invalid/blank votes | 8,240 | 4.74 | | |
| Total votes | 173,836 | 100.00 | | |
| Registered voters/turnout | 188,286 | 92.33 | | |
Source: Nohlen & Stöver
