= Luxembourg Socialist Workers' Party =

Luxembourg Socialist Workers' Party Lëtzebuerger Sozialistesch Aarbechterpartei
- Abbreviation: LSAP; POSL
- President: Georges Engel & Maxime Miltgen
- General Secretary: Sacha Pulli
- Founded: 1902
- Headquarters: 68, rue de Gasperich; Luxembourg City
- Youth wing: Luxembourg Socialist Youths
- Women's wing: Luxembourg Socialist Women
- Ideology: Social democracy
- Political position: Centre-left
- Regional affiliation: SGD/SVD
- European affiliation: Party of European Socialists
- European Parliament group: Progressive Alliance of Socialists and Democrats
- International affiliation: Progressive Alliance
- Colours: Red
- Chamber of Deputies: 12 / 60
- European Parliament: 1 / 6
- Local councils: 154 / 722
- Benelux Parliament: 2 / 7

Website
- lsap.lu

The Luxembourg Socialist Workers' Party (Luxembourgish: Lëtzebuerger Sozialistesch Aarbechterpartei, French: Parti ouvrier socialiste luxembourgeois, German: Luxemburger Sozialistische Arbeiterpartei), abbreviated to LSAP or POSL, is a social democratic, pro-European political party in Luxembourg. The LSAP sits on the centre-left of the political spectrum.

The LSAP is the third-largest party in the Chamber of Deputies, having won 11 of 60 seats at the 2023 general election, and has one seat in the European Parliament. Since March 2022, the party's President have been Francine Closener and Dan Biancalana.

The party is close to the Confederation of Independent Trade Unions, the country's largest trade union centre, but they have no formal links. The LSAP is particularly strong in the south of the country, controlling most of the mayoralties in the large towns of the Red Lands. It was a member of the Socialist International, and is currently a member of the Progressive Alliance and the Party of European Socialists.

== History ==
The party was formed on 5 July 1902 as the Social Democratic Party. Left-wing elements split in 1905 to create the Social Democratic Workers' Party. These were both re-united in 1912. In 1916, the party was renamed to Socialist Party, part of the Second International.

On 2 January 1921, communist elements split to create the Communist Party of Luxembourg. The Socialist Party was renamed the Luxembourg Workers' Party in 1924, and was a member of the Labour and Socialist International between 1923 and 1940. On 5 November 1937, the Party joined the government for the first time, in a coalition under Prime Minister Pierre Dupong.

=== Post-war ===
The party was reformed after the Second World War as the 'Luxembourg Socialist Workers' Party', in the mould of the Labour Party in the United Kingdom, where the government had been exiled. In the first election after the war, in 1945, the LSAP was the big loser, falling to 26% of the vote, but remained in the National Union Government, along with all other parties. In 1947, the party started its process of re-building itself, and it managed to join a coalition government (1951–1959 in the Dupong-Bodson and Bech Bodson governments, and 1964–1968 in the Werner-Cravatte government). The discussions over the party's direction split the LSAP again. On 2 May 1970, Henry Cravatte was ejected as president by a trades union-led coup. In March 1971, centrist elements, led by Cravatte, split to create the Social Democratic Party. Those who left included 6 Deputies and most of the party leadership.

However, the LSAP recovered by 1974 and joined the DP in a centre-left coalition (the Thorn-Vouel-Berg government), which enacted important social reforms: judicial system reforms (including a humanisation of the penal system), introduction of a fifth week of holiday, general introduction of the 40-hour week, the salary index, reform of unemployment benefits. This did not prevent an electoral defeat in 1979. In this legislative period, the LSAP held their famous energy conference, and decided a moratorium for the atomic power station of Remerschen. This was the definitive end of the project.

In 1984, the LSAP were re-united with most of the Social Democratic Party (some members joined the Christian Social People's Party).

=== Recent history ===
Following the 2004 general election, the LSAP served in the government of Luxembourg as junior partner to the Christian Social People's Party (CSV) under Prime Minister Jean-Claude Juncker in the first Juncker–Asselborn government, with the LSAP's Jean Asselborn serving as Deputy Prime Minister and Minister for Foreign Affairs. The coalition with the CSV continued as the second Juncker–Asselborn government following the 2009 general election, which lasted until July 2013 when the LSAP withdrew its support from the government, necessitating early elections.

Following the 2013 general election, the LSAP was in a three-party Bettel–Schneider government with the Democratic Party and The Greens, with the Democratic Party's Xavier Bettel serving as prime minister and Etienne Schneider of the LSAP as deputy prime minister. Since 2023, they have been in opposition again.

== Election results ==
=== Chamber of Deputies ===
Election	Votes	%	Elected seats	Seats after	+/–	Government
1919	231,672	15.6 (#2)	8 / 48		New	Opposition
1922 (Note: Partial election. Only half of the seats were up for renewal.)	73,963	10.7 (#4)	4 / 25	6 / 48	▼2	Opposition
1925	253,256	16.2 (#2)	8 / 47		Steady	Opposition
1928	352,970	32.6 (#2)	10 / 28	12 / 52	▲4	Opposition
1931	153,805	19.2 (#2)	5 / 27	15 / 54	▲3	Opposition
1934	404,729	29.4 (#2)	10 / 29	14 / 54	▼1	Opposition
1937	238,665	24.7 (#2)	7 / 26	18 / 55	▲4	Coalition
1945	569,025	23.4 (#2)	11 / 51		▼7	Coalition
1948	481,755	37.8 (#1)	10 / 26	15 / 51	▲4	Opposition
1951	372,177	33.8 (#2)	9 / 26	19 / 52	▲4	Coalition
1954	831,836	35.1 (#2)	17 / 52		▼2	Coalition
1959	848,523	34.9 (#2)	17 / 52		Steady	Opposition
1964	999,843	37.7 (#1)	21 / 56		▲4	Coalition
1968	837,555	32.3 (#2)	18 / 56		▼3	Opposition
1974	875,881	29.2 (#2)	17 / 59		▼1	Coalition
1979	787,863	24.3 (#2)	14 / 59		▼3	Opposition
1984	1,104,740	33.6 (#2)	21 / 64		▲7	Coalition
1989	840,094	26.2 (#2)	18 / 60		▼3	Coalition
1994	797,450	25.4 (#2)	17 / 60		▼1	Coalition
1999	695,718	22.3 (#3)	13 / 60		▼4	Opposition
2004	784,048	23.4 (#2)	14 / 60		▲1	Coalition
2009	695,830	21.6 (#2)	13 / 60		▼1	Coalition
2013	664,586	20.2 (#2)	13 / 60		Steady	Coalition
2018	621,332	17.6 (#2)	10 / 60		▼3	Coalition
2023	711,890	18.9 (#2)	11 / 60		▲1	Opposition

=== European Parliament ===
Election	List leader	Votes	%	Seats	+/–	EP Group
1979	Victor Abens	211,106	21.66 (#3)	1 / 6	New	SOC
1984	Victor Abens	296,382	29.93 (#2)	2 / 6	▲1	SOC
1989	Jacques Poos	252,920	25.45 (#2)	2 / 6	0	SOC
1994	Jacques Poos	251,500	24.80 (#2)	2 / 6	0	PES
1999	Alex Bodry	239,048	23.58 (#2)	2 / 6	0	PES
2004	Jean Asselborn	240,484	22.06 (#2)	1 / 6	▼1	PES
2009	Robert Goebbels	219,349	19.48 (#2)	1 / 6	0	S&D
2014	Mady Delvaux-Stehres	137,504	11.73 (#4)	1 / 6	0	S&D
2019	Nicolas Schmit	152,900	12.19 (#4)	1 / 6	0	S&D
2024	Marc Angel	300,879	21.72 (#2)	1 / 6	0	S&D

== Presidents ==
The formal leader of the party is the president. However, often, a government minister will be the most important member of the party, as Jean Asselborn is now. Below is a list of presidents of the Luxembourg Socialist Workers' Party since 1945.

- Michel Rasquin (1945–1951)
- Paul Wilwertz (1951–1952)
- Albert Bousser (1952–1954)
- Émile Ludwig (1954–1955)
- Paul Wilwertz (1955–1959)
- Henry Cravatte (1959–1970)
- Antoine Wehenkel (1970–1974)
- Lydie Schmit (1974–1980)
- Robert Krieps (1980–1985)
- Ben Fayot (1985–1997)
- Jean Asselborn (1997–2004)
- Alex Bodry (2004–2014)
- Claude Haagen (2014–2019)
- Franz Fayot (2019–2020)
- Yves Cruchten (2020–2022)
- Francine Closener and Dan Biancalana (2022–2026)
- Georges Engel and Maxime Miltgen (2026–present)
