= Lucien Dury =

Luxembourgish politician and journalist

Lucien Dury (6 February 1912 – 14 May 2002) was a Luxembourgish politician, journalist, and resistance leader. He was one of the founders of the Patriotic and Democratic Group, which later became the Democratic Party, of which he was the first President. He later served as the President of the DP again, from 1959 until 1962. He sat in the Chamber of Deputies from 1945 until 1951. He also sat on the communal council of Luxembourg City (1969–77). From 1949 to 1951 he was a substitute for Luxembourg in the European Parliament.

During the German occupation in the Second World War, Dury was a member of the Letzeburger Vollekslegio'n (LVL), of which he became leader in 1943. The following year, when the LVL merged into the Unio'n, Dury served as its first President. After the war, he was involved in founding the Lëtzebuerger Journal daily newspaper.

Party political offices
New title New party formed after World War II	President of the DP (first time); 1948 – 1952	Succeeded by Eugène Schaus
Preceded by Eugène Schaus	President of the DP (second time); 1959 – 1962	Succeeded by Gaston Thorn
