= Alphonse Osch =

Luxembourgish politician

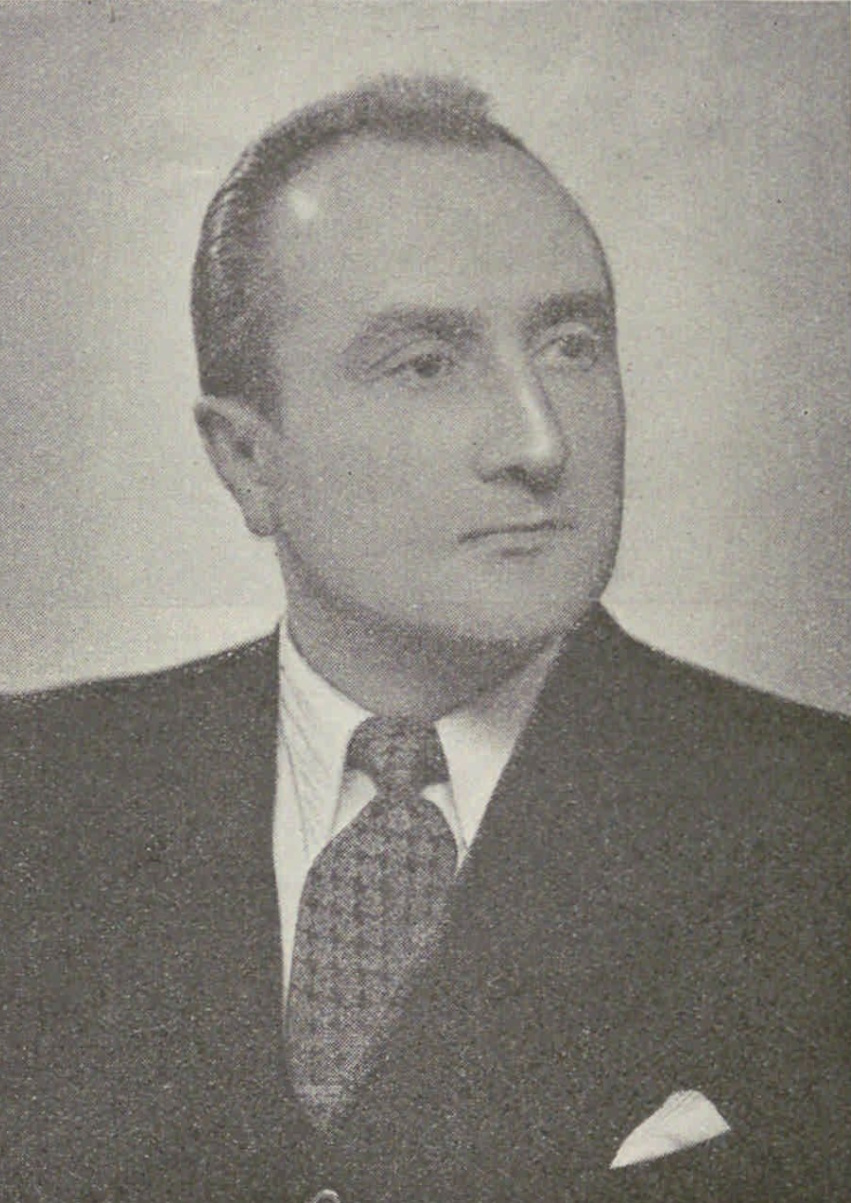
Osch c. 1947

Alphonse Osch (29 April 1909 – 18 June 1997) was a Luxembourgish politician.

He was a member of the Luxembourg Resistance during the Second World War, and was later a co-founder of the Democratic Party.

In 1945 and from 1953 to 1954, after the resignation of Ferdinand Frieden, he was a member of the Chamber of Deputies.

He was the minister for public health and war damages, from 1947 to 1948 in the Dupong-Schaus Ministry and from 1948 to 1951 in the Dupong-Schaus-Bodson Ministry.

From 1952 to 1961, and from 1971 to 1981 he was in the city council of Luxembourg City.

From 1953 to 1975 he was head of the insurance company La Bâloise.
