= Liberal Party (Luxembourg) =

Political party in Luxembourg

The Liberal Party was a political party in Luxembourg in the 1930s and 1940s.

== History ==
The party was established by liberals in the north of Luxembourg and was linked to the Radical Liberal Party. It was led by former National Independent Party and Progressive Democratic Party of the North MP Nicholas Mathieu.

In the 1937 elections it received 3.6% of the vote, winning a single seat. It did not contest any further elections.

Two further Liberal parties were established; the first after World War II failed to win any seats in the 1945 elections and most of its members joined the Patriotic and Democratic Group in the mid-1950s. The second was founded in 1974 as a breakaway from the Democratic Party. It contested elections in 1974 and 1979, but failed to win a seat.
