= Young Democrats (Luxembourg) =

Youth wing of the Democratic Party of Luxembourg

Young Democrats logo

The Young Democrats (Luxembourgish: Jonk Demokraten), or Democratic and Liberal Youth (French: Jeunesse Démocrate et Libérale), is a liberal youth movement affiliated to the Democratic Party of Luxembourg, from which it is independent.

It is a member of European Liberal Youth, the youth wing of the Alliance of Liberals and Democrats for Europe Party. Its president since 2024 is Lou Linster, the mayor of Leudelange.
