= Communist Party of Luxembourg =

Political party in Luxembourg

Communist Party of Luxembourg Kommunistesch Partei vu Lëtzebuerg
- Leader: Ali Ruckert
- Founded: 2 January 1921
- Split from: Luxembourg Socialist Workers' Party
- Headquarters: 3, rue Zénon Bernard; Esch-sur-Alzette
- Newspaper: Zeitung vum Lëtzebuerger Vollek
- Ideology: Communism; Marxism–Leninism; Hard Euroscepticism
- Political position: Far-left
- International affiliation: IMCWP
- Colours: Red
- Chamber of Deputies: 0 / 60
- European Parliament: 0 / 6
- Local councils: 1 / 722

Website
- kommunisten.lu

The Communist Party of Luxembourg (Luxembourgish: Kommunistesch Partei vu Lëtzebuerg; French: Parti Communiste Luxembourgeois; German: Kommunistische Partei Luxemburgs; KPL or PCL) is a Marxist-Leninist party in Luxembourg. Ali Ruckert is the current chairman of the party.

== History ==
The KPL was founded on 2 January 1921, in the town of Niederkorn, making it one of the oldest parties in Luxembourg. In 1937, the Bech government attempted to introduce the so-called Maulkuerfgesetz ("Muzzle law") which would have banned the party. The law was abandoned after failing to achieve popular support in a national referendum.

Following the end of the Second World War, the party, which won 11.1% in the legislative elections, joined the National Union Government (1945–47). Its first minister was Charles Marx. After Marx's death in a 1946 car accident, he was replaced by Dominique Urbany. After the death of the leader of the LSAP, the coalition collapsed. With the principle of an all-inclusive government gone, the KPL was excluded from the next government and never returned another member to the cabinet.

In 1964, the United States State Department estimated the party membership to be approximately 500. In legislative elections held in the same year, the party registered 10.4% of the vote, and won five of the Chamber of Deputies' 56 seats. The party's representation in the Chamber peaked at the following election, with six deputies, but fell, until the KPL lost its last remaining deputy in 1994. In the same year a minority opposing the Marxist-Leninist line of the party split and founded the New Left (Luxembourgish: Nei Lénk) together with the rest of the Revolutionary Socialist Party (Luxembourgish: Revolutionär Sozialistesch Partei).

In 1999, the KPL and the New Left agreed to found The Left (Luxembourgish: Déi Lénk). The Left had members of both parties and independents. Accordingly, KPL members ran on The Left lists in the 1999 and 2000 elections and no separate KPL lists existed. After disputes between a majority within the Left and leading KPL members shortly before the 2004 elections the party again ran separate lists. A number of the Left members were subsequently expelled from the KPL.

The KPL is represented locally on the councils of Differdange and Rumelange. In Rumelange, it is part of the ruling coalition together with the LSAP.

== Election results ==
=== Chamber of Deputies ===
Year	Votes	%	Elected seats	Seats after	+/–	Government
1922 (Note: Partial election. Only half of the seats were up for renewal.)	6,976	1.0 (#5)	0 / 25	0 / 48	New	Extra-parliamentary
1925	15,443	0.9 (#11)	0 / 47		0	Extra-parliamentary
1928	Did not participate		0 / 28	0 / 52	0	Extra-parliamentary
1931	6,264	0.7 (#8)	0 / 27	0 / 54	0	Extra-parliamentary
1934	70,940	5.2 (#4)	1 / 29	1 / 54	▲1	Opposition
1937	Did not participate		0 / 26	0 / 55	▼1	Extra-parliamentary
1945	295,701	11.1 (#4)	5 / 51		▲5	Coalition
1948	195,956	14.3 (#3)	4 / 26	5 / 51	0	Opposition
1951	35,662	3.2 (#4)	0 / 26	4 / 52	▼1	Opposition
1954	211,171	7.3 (#4)	3 / 52		▼1	Opposition
1959	220,425	7.2 (#4)	3 / 52		0	Opposition
1964	330,909	10.4 (#3)	5 / 56		▲2	Opposition
1968	402,610	13.1 (#4)	6 / 56		▲1	Opposition
1974	314,635	8.8 (#4)	5 / 59		▼1	Opposition
1979	177,286	4.9 (#5)	2 / 59		▼3	Opposition
1984	165,960	4.4 (#5)	2 / 64		0	Opposition
1989	157,608	4.4 (#5)	1 / 60		▼1	Opposition
1994	57,646	1.7 (#7)	0 / 60		▼1	Extra-parliamentary
1999 (Note: Results for The Left alliance.)	110,274	3.3 (#6)	1 / 60		▲1	Opposition
2004	35,524	0.9 (#7)	0 / 60		▼1	Extra-parliamentary
2009	49,108	1.4 (#7)	0 / 60		0	Extra-parliamentary
2013	53,669	1.6 (#8)	0 / 60		0	Extra-parliamentary
2018	44,916	1.3 (#8)	0 / 60		0	Extra-parliamentary
2023	24,275	0.6 (#10)	0 / 60		0	Extra-parliamentary

=== European Parliament ===
Election	List leader	Votes	%	Seats	+/–	EP Group
1979	René Urbany	48,813	5.01 (#5)	0 / 6	New	–
1984	René Urbany	40,395	4.08 (#5)	0 / 6	0	–
1989	René Urbany	46,791	4.71 (#5)	0 / 6	0	–
1994	Aloyse Bisdorff	16,559	1.63 (#7)	0 / 6	0	–
1999	Did not contest			0 / 6	0	–
2004	Zénon Bernard	12,800	1.17 (#7)	0 / 6	0	–
2009	Ali Ruckert	17,304	1.54 (#7)	0 / 6	0	–
2014	Ali Ruckert	17,506	1.49 (#0)	0 / 6	0	–
2019	Ali Ruckert	14,323	1.14 (#9)	0 / 6	0	–
2024	Ali Ruckert	13,368	0.97 (#10)	0 / 6	0	–

== References and further reading ==
- Kovacs, Stéphanie (2011). "Les relations entre le Parti Communiste Luxembourgeois (PCL) et le SED (« Sozialistische Einheitspartei Deutschlands ») de 1948 à 1983, vues à travers les rapports internes des Archives fédérales d'Allemagne". Du Luxembourg à l'Europe. Hommages à Gilbert Trausch à l'occasion de son 80e anniversaire (in French). Luxembourg: Editions Saint-Paul. ISBN 978-2-87963-836-2.
- Ruckert, Ali, Geschichte der Kommunistischen Partei Luxemburgs, Teil I: 1921-1946, Esch-sur-Alzette 2006 OCLC 219699513
- Ruckert, Ali, Geschichte der Kommunistischen Partei Luxemburgs, Teil II: 1947-1954, Esch-sur-Alzette 2007 OCLC 316277089
- Ruckert, Ali, Geschichte der Kommunistischen Partei Luxemburgs, Teil III: 1955-1960, Esch-sur-Alzette 2010 OCLC 724402104
- Wehenkel, Henri, "Communisme et postcommunisme au Luxembourg", in: Communisme 2014, 1989-2014 - L'éternel retour des communistes, p. 165-172
- Wehenkel, Henri, "Die Kommunistische Partei Luxemburgs. Aufstieg und Fall einer Partei" in: Moreau, Patrick/Marc Lazar/Gerhard Hirscher (eds.), Der Kommunismus in Westeuropa, Niedergang oder Mutation?, Landsberg/Lech, 1998, p. 477-497
- Wehenkel, Henri/ Foetz, Guy/Hoffmann, André, 1921-1981. Beiträge zur Geschichte der Kommunistischen Partei Luxemburgs, Luxembourg 1981
- Wehenkel, Henri/Redondo, Jean-Laurent/Hoffmann, André/Urbany, Serge, "Table ronde: PCL et/ou nouvelle gauche: renouvellement et/ou scission", in: Cahiers Marxistes, No. 201, April–May 1996, p. 121-144 ISSN 1195-0013
