= Pierre Dupong =

Prime Minister of Luxembourg from 1937 to 1953

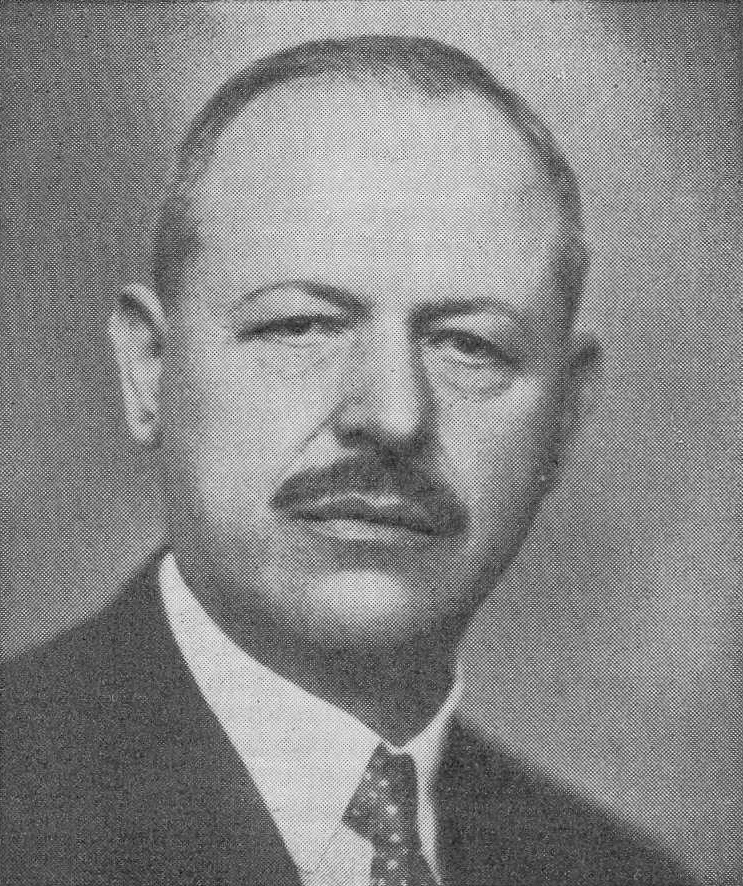
- Undated portrait of Dupong

Prime Minister of Luxembourg
- In office 5 November 1937 – 23 December 1953
- Monarch: Charlotte
- Preceded by: Joseph Bech
- Succeeded by: Joseph Bech

Minister for Finances
- In office 16 July 1926 – 23 December 1953
- Prime Minister: Joseph Bech; Himself
- Preceded by: Étienne Schmit
- Succeeded by: Pierre Werner

Minister for the Armed Forces
- In office 14 July 1948 – 3 July 1951
- Prime Minister: Himself
- Preceded by: Lambert Schaus
- Succeeded by: Joseph Bech
- In office 5 November 1937 – 1 March 1947
- Prime Minister: Himself
- Preceded by: Position established
- Succeeded by: Lambert Schaus

Personal details
- Born: 1 November 1885 Heisdorf, Luxembourg
- Died: 23 December 1953 (aged 68) Luxembourg, Luxembourg
- Party: Party of the Right (−1944); Christian Social People's Party (1944–1953)
- Spouse: Sophie Dupong

Pierre Dupong (French pronunciation: [pjɛʁ dypɔ̃]; 1 November 1885 – 23 December 1953) was a Luxembourgish politician and statesman. He served as prime minister of Luxembourg for sixteen years, from 5 November 1937 until his death, on 23 December 1953, and was also responsible at different times for the ministries of finance, the army, agriculture, labour and social matters. He founded the Christian Social People's Party (CSV) as the main conservative party after the Second World War, having been a founding member of the Party of the Right (PD) in 1914.

He was one of the founding members in 1914 of the Party of the Right, and was elected to the legislature in 1915. He served as Director-General for Finance from 1926 to 1937 and as Minister for Social Security and Labor in 1936 and 1937.

His first government was the Dupong-Krier Ministry (1937–1940). Between 1940 and 1944, Dupong then led the Luxembourgish government-in-exile, after Luxembourg had been occupied by Nazi Germany. He fled the country along with the rest of the Luxembourg government and the Grand Ducal Family of Luxembourg, settling in France. Once in Bordeaux, they were granted transit visas from the Portuguese consul Aristides de Sousa Mendes, in June 1940. Pierre Dupong, along with his wife Sophie, and their children Marie Thérèse, Lambert Henri, Henriette and Jean, followed the Grand Ducal family through Coimbra and Lisbon, settling at Praia das Maçãs after the Grand Ducal family had moved to Cascais. By August, the entire entourage had moved to Monte Estoril. The Dupong couple stayed at Chalet Posser de Andrade until 26 September 1940, while their children remained there until 2 October 1940. On 26 September, the couple boarded the S.S. Excalibur headed for New York City, arriving on 5 October 1940. Georgette and Betty Bech, the wife and daughter of Joseph Bech, the Foreign Minister of the Luxembourg government-in-exile, traveled with them.

Between 1940 and 1944, he led the government in exile in Montreal.

He then presided over the Liberation Government, the National Union Government, and the Dupong-Schaus and the Dupong-Bodson governments. He is also notable for sending Luxembourgish soldiers in the UN mission during the Korean War, as part of the Belgian United Nations Command.

He was the father of Jean Dupong, who became a minister and CSV deputy himself.

Political offices
| Preceded by Guillaume Leidenbach | Minister for Finances; 1926–1953 | Succeeded by Pierre Werner |
| Preceded by Joseph Bech | Prime Minister of Luxembourg; 1937–1953 | Succeeded by Joseph Bech |
| Preceded by New office | Minister for Defence; 1st time 1937–1947 | Succeeded by Lambert Schaus |
| Preceded by Lambert Schaus | Minister for Defence; 2nd time 1948–1951 | Succeeded by Joseph Bech |
