= Democratic Party (Luxembourg) =

Democratic Party Demokratesch Partei
- Abbreviation: DP
- Leader: Carole Hartmann
- Founded: 24 April 1955
- Headquarters: 2a, rue des Capucins, Luxembourg City
- Youth wing: Democratic and Liberal Youth
- Ideology: Liberalism; Economic liberalism Social liberalism Pro-Europeanism
- Political position: Centre to centre-right
- Regional affiliation: Liberal Group
- European affiliation: Alliance of Liberals and Democrats for Europe
- European Parliament group: Renew Europe
- International affiliation: Liberal International
- Colours: Blue
- Chamber of Deputies: 14 / 60 (23%)
- European Parliament: 1 / 6 (17%)
- Local councils: 135 / 722
- Benelux Parliament: 1 / 7

Website
- dp.lu

The Democratic Party (DP; Luxembourgish: Demokratesch Partei, French: Parti démocratique, German: Demokratische Partei) is the major social-liberal political party in Luxembourg. One of the three major parties, the DP sits on the centre to centre-right, holding moderate market liberal views combined with a strong emphasis on civil liberties, human rights, and internationalism.

Founded in 1955, the party is currently led by Lex Delles. Its former president, Xavier Bettel, was the Prime Minister of Luxembourg from 2013 to 2023, leading the Bettel I and II governments in coalition with the Luxembourg Socialist Workers' Party (LSAP) and The Greens. It is the second-largest party in the Chamber of Deputies, with fourteen seats out of sixty, having won 17.8% of the vote at the 2023 general election, and has one seat in the European Parliament out of six. The party's stronghold is around Luxembourg City, where it, and its predecessor, the Liberal League (LL), have held the mayorship for all but 10 years since 1904.

The party has often played the minor coalition partner to the Christian Social People's Party (CSV). In Gaston Thorn and Xavier Bettel, the DP has provided the only Prime Ministers of Luxembourg since 1945 not to be affiliated with the CSV (1974–1979 and 2013–2023). The party is a member of the Alliance of Liberals and Democrats for Europe (ALDE) and the Liberal International. The party has been one of the most influential liberal parties in Europe, due to its strength, its regular involvement in government, its role in international institutions, and Thorn's leadership.

== History ==
=== Emergence as major party ===
Although the party traces its history back to the foundation of the Liberal League in 1904, it was founded in its current form on 24 April 1955. It was the successor to the Democratic Group, which had grown out of the major group of war-time liberal resistance fighters, the Patriotic and Democratic Group. The DP spent the majority of the 1950s and 1960s, under the leadership of Lucien Dury and then Gaston Thorn, establishing itself as the third major party, ahead of the Communist Party.

At the time of its foundation, the party had six seats in the Chamber of Deputies. At the following election in 1959, the DP won 11 seats, allowing it to serve as a minor role in a grand coalition with the Christian Social People's Party (CSV) and Luxembourg Socialist Workers' Party (LSAP). However, in 1964, the party went back to six seats. In 1968, the DP absorbed the anti-establishment Popular Independent Movement. In that year's election, the party benefited from a tide of moderates shifting from an increasingly radical LSAP, returned to 11 seats, and consequently entered into government with the CSV under Prime Minister Pierre Werner.

=== Government ===
The DP remained in coalition with the CSV until 1974, when it experienced a surge in support in the 1974 general election, to 22.2% of the vote and 14 seats. This political upset gave it the opportunity to enter into coalition negotiations with the second-placed LSAP. Surprisingly, in the negotiations, the DP got the upper hand, securing the most ministerial positions and departments, as well as the premiership itself under Gaston Thorn.

The formation of Thorn's government, however, coincided with the beginning of an economic crisis, and the government was occupied mostly with the restructuring of the steel industry whilst attempting to avoid mass unemployment.

Despite this, the coalition managed to push through major reforms of social policy, including abolishing capital punishment (1974), allowing no-fault divorce (1975) and broadening at-fault divorce (1978), and legalising abortion (1978). In 1977, the government abandoned plans to build a nuclear power plant at Remerschen, of which the DP had been the primary advocate. When PM, in 1975, Thorn sat as President of the United Nations General Assembly.

=== Since 1979 ===
In 1979, Thorn went head-to-head with Werner, with the LSAP serving a supporting role to the DP. Both the CSV ended victorious, gaining six seats, and the LSAP's loss of three seats made it impossible for the DP to renew the coalition with them. As a result, Werner formed a coalition with the DP, with Thorn as Deputy Prime Minister. In the first European election in 1979, the DP won 2 seats: an achievement that it hasn't matched since. In 1980, Thorn was named the new President of the European Commission, and was replaced by Colette Flesch.

The 1984 general election saw the DP's first electoral setback in twenty years. The DP lost one seat, standing on 14, whilst the resurgence of the LSAP meant it overtook the Democratic Party once again. The LSAP formed a coalition with the CSV, with Jacques Poos serving as Deputy Prime Minister to Jacques Santer. This was renewed twice again, and the DP remained out of government until 1999.

After the 1999 general election, the DP became the second-largest party in the Chamber of Deputies once again, with 15 seats. It also overtook the LSAP in vote share for the first time ever. This allowed it to displace the LSAP as the CSV's coalition partner, with Lydie Polfer as Deputy Prime Minister. As a result of the 2004 general election, the DP lost 5 seats, bringing its total down to 10. The party also lost its place as the coalition partner back to the LSAP, and remained in opposition until 2013. In the 2013 general election, held early due to the collapse of the second Juncker–Asselborn government, the party acquired 13 deputies with 18.3% of the vote, becoming joint second-largest party along with the LSAP. In October 2013 the DP negotiated a three-party coalition government with the LSAP and The Greens, and on 4 December 2013 the Bettel-Schneider government was sworn in, with DP leader Xavier Bettel serving as Prime Minister. The 2018 general election saw the DP lose a seat, but the three-party coalition was able to maintain its majority under the Bettel II Government. In 2023, though the DP gained the most votes in its history and had its best result since 1999 with 14 seats, the electoral defeat of the Greens, who went from 9 to 4 seats, meant the government lost its majority. The party became a junior coalition partner to the CSV, with Bettel becoming Deputy Prime Minister in the Frieden-Bettel Government.

== Ideology ==
The Democratic Party sits on the moderate centre-right of the political spectrum in Luxembourg. Since the late 1960s, thanks to the secularisation of Luxembourg and the CSV, the party has moved gradually towards the centre, to allow it to form coalitions with either the CSV or LSAP. Now, it could be seen to be to the left of the CSV, in the centre, and with more in common with the British Liberal Democrats or German Free Democratic Party than with liberal parties in Belgium or the Netherlands. However, the CSV usually prefers forming coalitions with the LSAP to those with the DP, pushing the DP to the economically liberal right.

In economic policies, the DP is a strong supporter of private property rights, free trade, and the free market, although under Thorn's government, the DP greatly increased public sector employment. Taxation plays a major role in the party platform. It is also a supporter of agriculture, particularly the wine industry. It long advocated the advancement of nuclear power, but scrapped plans to build a plant at Remerschen, and now supports renewable alternatives, although not opposing nuclear power in principle. Indicating its priorities, when in government, the DP has usually or always controlled ministries in charge of Transport, Public Works, the Middle Class, the Civil Service, and Energy.

The DP is the most outspoken party in support of civil liberties. Between 1974 and 1979, it legalised abortion and divorce, and abolished the death penalty. It also focuses its attention on the issues of minority groups, particularly migrant groups, but also homosexuals and single mothers. Unlike the Catholic CSV, the DP is notably anti-clerical, which gives it more importance than its electoral performances would suggest.

The DP has led the CSV and LSAP in becoming more internationalist in outlook, focusing on the European Union, environmentalism, and advocacy of human rights abroad. It is the most vocal supporter of European integration, even in a particularly pro-EU country. The party puts great emphasis on the role of the United Nations, and Thorn served as President of the UN General Assembly. The party is centrist on national security, supporting membership of NATO, but having worked to end conscription.

== Organization ==
=== Presidents ===
The leader of the party is the president. Below is a list of presidents of the Democratic Party, and its predecessors, since 1948.

- Lucien Dury (1948–1952)
- Eugène Schaus (1952–1959)
- Lucien Dury (1959–1962)
- Gaston Thorn (1962–1969)
- René Konen (1969–1971)
- Gaston Thorn (1971–1980)
- Colette Flesch (1980–1989)
- Charles Goerens (1989–1994)
- Lydie Polfer (1994–2004)
- Claude Meisch (2004–2013)
- Xavier Bettel (2013–2015)
- Corinne Cahen (2015–2022)
- Lex Delles (2022–2025)
- Carole Hartmann (2025–president)

=== Political support ===
The DP has been consistent in its advocacy of the middle class, and consequently has a very distinctive class profile. When in government, the DP has always held the office of Minister for the Middle Class. Most DP supporters are civil servants, white-collar workers, self-employed people, and those on high incomes. This group has been fast-growing, further focusing the party's electoral socio-economic appeal.

The party's most successful areas electorally are Luxembourg City and its wealthy suburbs, where those groups are concentrated. The Mayor of Luxembourg City has come from the DP since 1970, and the party and its liberal predecessors have been out of the office for only seven years since the foundation of the Liberal League in 1904. The city lies in the Centre constituency, where the DP challenges the CSV for the most seats. However, the party also has some traditional following in Est and the Nord, consistently coming second in each.

The party has notably more support amongst young people, whilst the CSV, LSAP, and (recently) the Alternative Democratic Reform Party tend to receive the votes of older people. Unlike the CSV and LSAP, the DP is not affiliated to a major trade union. The party is particularly popular amongst male voters. Despite its anti-clericalism, DP voters are no less religiously affiliated than the general population.

== International affiliation ==
In the European Committee of the Regions, the DP sits with the Renew Europe Group, with two full and one alternate members for the 2025-2030 mandate.

== Election results ==
=== Chamber of Deputies ===
Election	Votes	%	Elected seats	Seats after	+/–	Government
1945	366,860	18.0 (#3)	9 / 51		New	Coalition
1948 (Note: Partial election. Only half of the seats were up for renewal.)	97,415	11.6 (#3)	3 / 26	9 / 51	0	Coalition
1951	215,511	20.9 (#3)	5 / 26	8 / 52	▼1	Opposition
1954	255,522	12.3 (#3)	6 / 52		▼2	Opposition
1959	448,387	20.3 (#3)	11 / 52		▲5	Coalition
1964	280,644	12.2 (#3)	6 / 56		▼5	Opposition
1968	430,262	18.0 (#3)	11 / 56		▲5	Coalition
1974	668,043	23.3 (#3)	14 / 59		▲3	Coalition
1979	648,404	21.9 (#2)	15 / 59		▲1	Coalition
1984	614,627	20.4 (#3)	14 / 64		▼1	Opposition
1989	498,862	17.2 (#3)	11 / 60		▼3	Opposition
1994	548,246	19.3 (#3)	12 / 60		▲1	Opposition
1999	632,707	22.4 (#2)	15 / 60		▲3	Coalition
2004	460,601	16.1 (#3)	10 / 60		▼5	Opposition
2009	432,820	15.0 (#3)	9 / 60		▼1	Opposition
2013	597,879	18.3 (#3)	13 / 60		▲4	Coalition
2018	597,080	16.9 (#3)	12 / 60		▼1	Coalition
2023	703,833	18.7 (#3)	14 / 60		▲2	Coalition

=== European Parliament ===
Election	List leader	Votes	%	Seats	+/–	EP Group
1979	Gaston Thorn	274,307	28.13 (#2)	2 / 6	New	LD
1984	Colette Flesch	218,481	22.07 (#3)	1 / 6	▼1	LDR
1989	Colette Flesch	198,254	19.95 (#3)	1 / 6	0	LDR
1994	Lydie Polfer	190,977	18.83 (#3)	1 / 6	0	ELDR
1999	Charles Goerens	207,379	20.46 (#2)	1 / 6	0	ELDR
2004	Lydie Polfer	162,064	14.87 (#4)	1 / 6	0	ALDE
2009	Charles Goerens	210,107	18.66 (#3)	1 / 6	0	ALDE
2014	Charles Goerens	173,255	14.78 (#3)	1 / 6	0	ALDE
2019	Charles Goerens	268,910	21.44 (#1)	2 / 6	▲1	RE
2024	Charles Goerens	253,344	18.29 (#3)	1 / 6	▼1	RE

== See also ==
- Liberalism in Luxembourg
