= Christian Social People's Party =

Christian Social People's Party Chrëschtlech-Sozial Vollekspartei
- Abbreviation: CSV; PCS
- President: Luc Frieden
- General Secretary: Françoise Kemp; Alex Donnersbach
- Founded: December 1944; 81 years ago
- Preceded by: Party of the Right
- Youth wing: Christian Social Youth
- Ideology: Christian democracy Conservatism
- Political position: Centre-right
- Regional affiliation: Christian Group
- European affiliation: European People's Party
- European Parliament group: European People's Party Group
- International affiliation: Centrist Democrat International
- Colours: Black; Light blue Orange; White
- Slogan: Kloer, no & gerecht. ('Clear, close, and just.')
- Chamber of Deputies: 21 / 60
- European Parliament: 2 / 6
- Local councils: 192 / 722
- Benelux Parliament: 2 / 7

Website
- csv.lu

The Christian Social People's Party (Luxembourgish: Chrëschtlech-Sozial Vollekspartei, French: Parti populaire chrétien-social, German: Christlich-Soziale Volkspartei, CSV or PCS) is the largest political party in Luxembourg. The party follows a Christian democratic and conservative ideology and has been described as centre-right. Furthermore, akin to most parties in Luxembourg, it is strongly pro-European. The CSV is a member of the Christian Group, European People's Party, and the Centrist Democrat International.

The CSV has been the largest party in the Chamber of Deputies since the party's formation, and currently holds 21 of 60 seats in the Chamber. Since World War II, every Prime Minister of Luxembourg has been a member of the CSV, with only two exceptions: Gaston Thorn from 1974 to 1979 and Xavier Bettel from 2013 to 2023. It holds two of Luxembourg's six seats in the European Parliament, as it has for 14 of the 44 years for which MEPs have been directly elected.

The CSV is a major political force in Luxembourg and has been the country's primary governing party for most of the era since 1945. The party's president has been prime minister Luc Frieden since March 2024. A leading figure from the party is the former prime minister, Jean-Claude Juncker, who previously governed in coalition with the Luxembourg Socialist Workers' Party (LSAP) until the 2013 general election.

== History ==
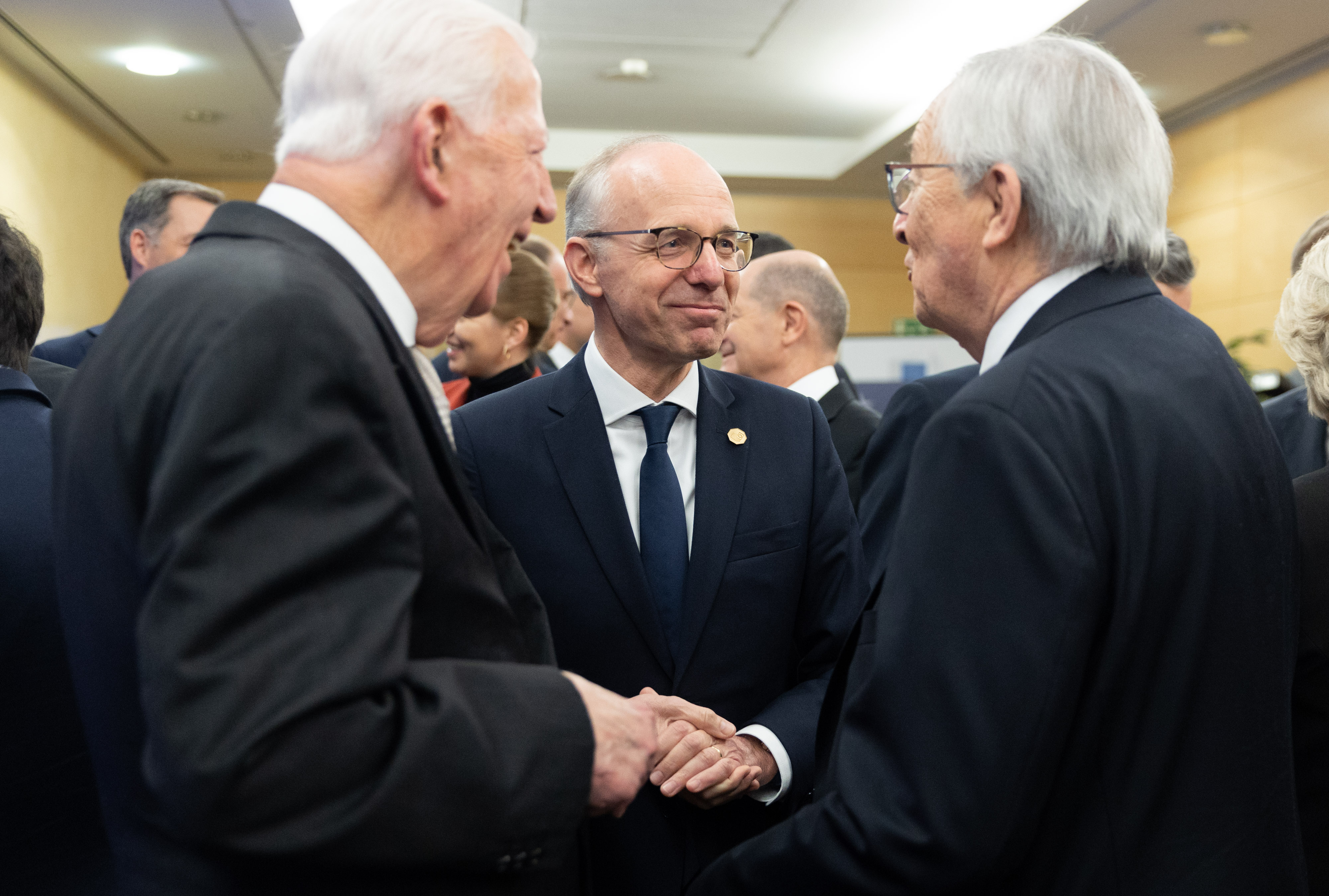
Jacques Santer (1984–1995), Luc Frieden (2023–) and Jean-Claude Juncker (1995–2013), the three living prime ministers of Luxembourg from the CSV.

The earliest roots of the CSV date back to the foundation of the Party of the Right on 16 January 1914.

In December 1944, the Party of the Right was officially transformed into the Luxembourg Christian Social People's Party. "Luxembourg" was dropped from the name by late March 1945. The first elections after the Second World War took place in 1945; the party won 25 out of 51 seats, missing an absolute majority by a single seat.

From 1945 to 1974, the party was in government and gave Luxembourg the following Prime Ministers: Pierre Dupong, Joseph Bech, Pierre Frieden, and Pierre Werner. Mostly in coalition with the Democratic Party (DP), it gave Luxembourg a certain economic and social stability.

In the 1950s, the party structure underwent a certain democratisation: the party's youth section (founded in 1953) and women's section received representation in the party's central organs.

The party went into opposition for the first time in 1974, when the Democratic Party's Gaston Thorn became Prime Minister in coalition with the Luxembourg Socialist Workers' Party (LSAP). In 1979, the party returned to government after its victory in the 1979 general election; Pierre Werner became PM.

In 1984, Jacques Santer became PM. He remained as such until 1995, when Jean-Claude Juncker became PM, with Santer meanwhile taking up the post of President of the European Commission.

Following the 2013 general election, the party went into opposition for the second time in its history as the Democratic Party's Xavier Bettel became Prime Minister in coalition with the LSAP and The Greens. Despite remaining the largest party, the result of the 2018 general election represented the lowest public support in the party's history.

As of 2023, CSV is against making Luxembourgish an Official Language of the European Union, citing that French and German already being official languages is "enough for the needs of Luxembourg."

== Election results ==
=== Chamber of Deputies ===
Election	List leader	Votes	%	Seats		+/–	Status
Election	List leader	Votes	%	Up	Total	+/–	Status
1945	Pierre Dupong	907,601	44.7 (#1)	25 / 51		New	Coalition
1948 (Note: Partial election. Only half of the seats were up for renewal.)	Pierre Dupong	386,972	36.3 (#1)	9 / 26	22 / 51	▼2	Coalition
1951	Pierre Dupong	425,545	42.1 (#1)	12 / 26	21 / 52	▼1	Coalition
1954	Joseph Bech	1,003,406	45.2 (#1)	26 / 52		▲5	Coalition
1959	Pierre Frieden	896,840	38.9 (#1)	21 / 52		▼5	Coalition
1964	Pierre Werner	883,079	35.7 (#1)	22 / 56		▲1	Coalition
1968	Pierre Werner	915,944	37.5 (#1)	21 / 56		▼1	Coalition
1974	Pierre Werner	836,990	29.9 (#1)	18 / 59		▼3	Opposition
1979	Pierre Werner	1,049,390	36.4 (#1)	24 / 59		▲6	Coalition
1984	Jacques Santer	1,148,085	36.7 (#1)	25 / 64		▲1	Coalition
1989	Jacques Santer	977,521	32.4 (#1)	22 / 60		▼3	Coalition
1994	Jacques Santer	887,651	30.3 (#1)	21 / 60		▼1	Coalition
1999	Jean-Claude Juncker	870,985	30.1 (#1)	19 / 60		▼2	Coalition
2004	Jean-Claude Juncker	1,103,825	36.1 (#1)	24 / 60		▲5	Coalition
2009	Jean-Claude Juncker	1,129,368	38.0 (#1)	26 / 60		▲2	Coalition
2013	Jean-Claude Juncker	1,103,636	33.7 (#1)	23 / 60		▼3	Opposition
2018	Claude Wiseler	999,381	28.3 (#1)	21 / 60		▼2	Opposition
2023	Luc Frieden	1,099,427	29.2 (#1)	21 / 60		Steady	Coalition

=== European Parliament ===
Election	List leader	Votes	%	Seats	+/–	EP Group
1979	Pierre Werner	352,296	36.13 (#1)	3 / 6	New	EPP
1984	Jacques Santer	345,586	34.90 (#1)	3 / 6	Steady	EPP
1989	Jacques Santer	346,621	34.87 (#1)	3 / 6	Steady	EPP
1994	Jean-Claude Juncker	319,462	31.50 (#1)	2 / 6	▼1	EPP
1999	Jean-Claude Juncker	321,021	31.67 (#1)	2 / 6	Steady	EPP-ED
2004	Jean-Claude Juncker	404,823	37.14 (#1)	3 / 6	▲1	EPP-ED
2009	Viviane Reding	353,094	31.36 (#1)	3 / 6	Steady	EPP
2014	Viviane Reding	441,578	37.66 (#1)	3 / 6	Steady	EPP
2019	Christophe Hansen	264,665	21.10 (#2)	2 / 6	▼1	EPP
2024	Christophe Hansen	317,334	22.91 (#1)	2 / 6	Steady	EPP

== Party office-holders ==
=== Presidents ===
- Émile Reuter (1945–1964)
- Tony Biever (1964–1965)
- Jean Dupong (1965–1972)
- Nicolas Mosar (1972–1974)
- Jacques Santer (1974–1982)
- Jean Spautz (1982–1990)
- Jean-Claude Juncker (1990–1995)
- Erna Hennicot-Schoepges (1995–2003)
- François Biltgen (2003–2009)
- Michel Wolter (2009–2014)
- Marc Spautz (2014–2019)
- Frank Engel (2019–2021)
- Claude Wiseler (2021–2023)
- Elisabeth Margue (2022–2024)
- Luc Frieden (2024–present)

=== General Secretaries ===
- Nicolas Hommel (1944–1946)
- Lambert Schaus (1945–1952)
- Pierre Grégoire (1952–1960)
- Nicolas Mosar (1960–1972)
- Jacques Santer (1972–1974)
- Jean Weber (1974–1977)
- Jean-Pierre Kraemer (1977–1984)
- Willy Bourg (1984–1990)
- Camille Dimmer (1990–1995)
- Claude Wiseler (1995–2000)
- Jean-Louis Schiltz (2000–2006)
- Marco Schank (2006–2009)
- Marc Spautz (2009–2012)
- Laurent Zeimet (2012–2019)
- Félix Eischen (2019–2021)
- Christophe Hansen (2021–2023)
- Stéphanie Weydert (2022–2024)

=== Presidents of Christian Social People's Party in the Chamber of Deputies ===
- Tony Biever (1959–1974)
- Pierre Werner (1974–1979)
- Nicolas Mosar (1979–1984)
- François Colling (1984–1995)
- Lucien Weiler (1996–2004)
- Michel Wolter (2004–2009)
- Jean-Louis Schiltz (2009–2011)
- Lucien Thiel (2011)+
- Marc Spautz (2011–2013)
- Gilles Roth (2013)
- Claude Wiseler (2014–2018)
- Martine Hansen (2018–2023)
- Marc Spautz (2023–present)

+ Died in office

== See also ==
- List of political parties in Luxembourg
