= Chamber of Deputies (Luxembourg) =

Unicameral legislature of Luxembourg

Chamber of Deputies D'Chamber Chambre des Députés Abgeordnetenkammer
- 35th Chamber of Deputies

Type
- Type: Unicameral

History
- Founded: 1848; 178 years ago
- New session started: 24 October 2023

Leadership
- President: Claude Wiseler (CSV) since 21 November 2023
- Vice Presidents: Michel Wolter (CSV) since 21 November 2023
- Mars Di Bartolomeo (LSAP) since 21 November 2023
- André Bauler (DP) since 20 January 2026

Structure
- Seats: 60
- Political groups: Government (Frieden-Bettel Cabinet) (35) CSV (21) DP (14) Opposition (25) LSAP (12) ADR (5) Greens (4) Pirates (2) The Left (2)

Elections
- Voting system: Open list proportional representation, allocated by the D'Hondt method in four constituencies
- Last election: 8 October 2023
- Next election: By 8 October 2028

Meeting place
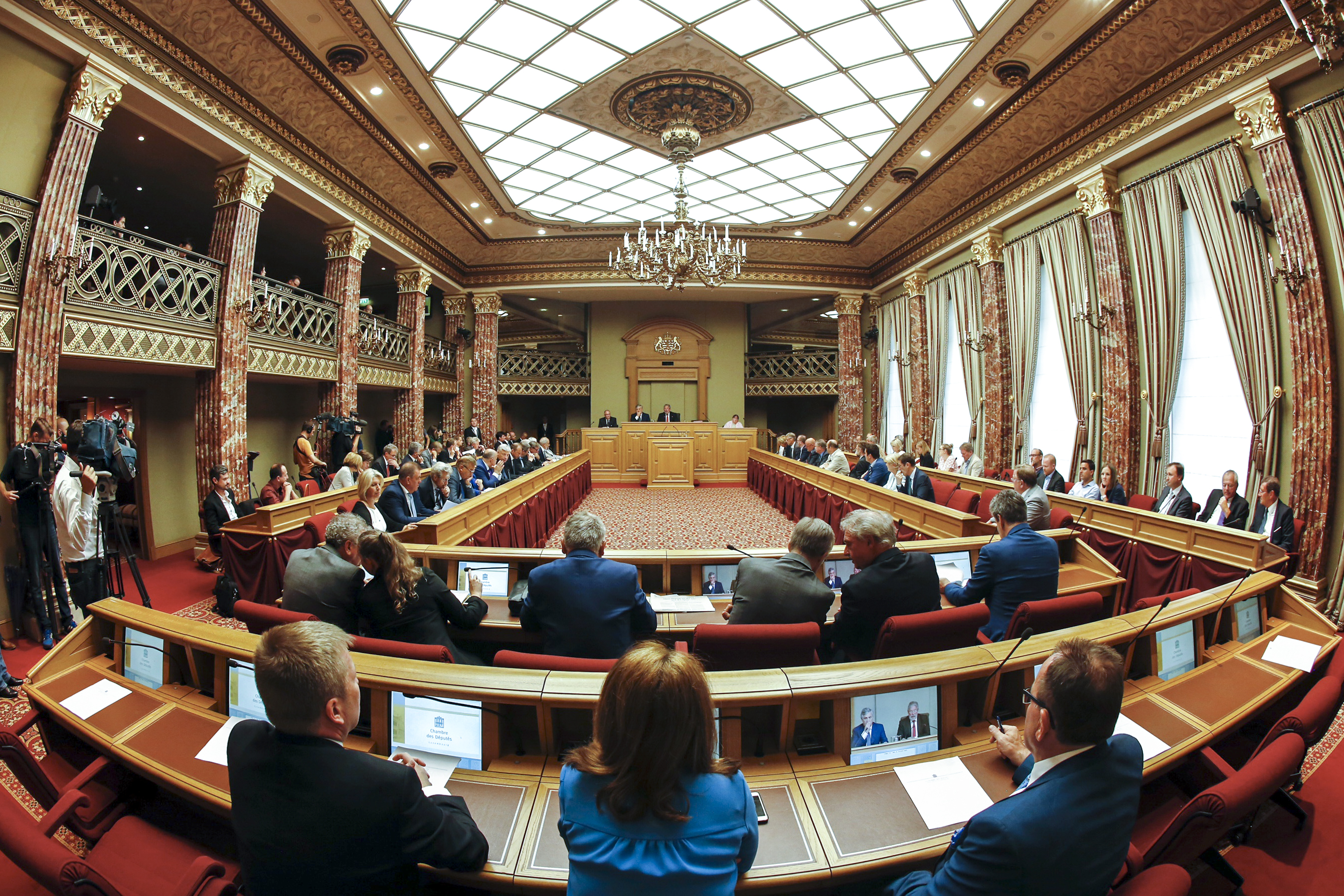

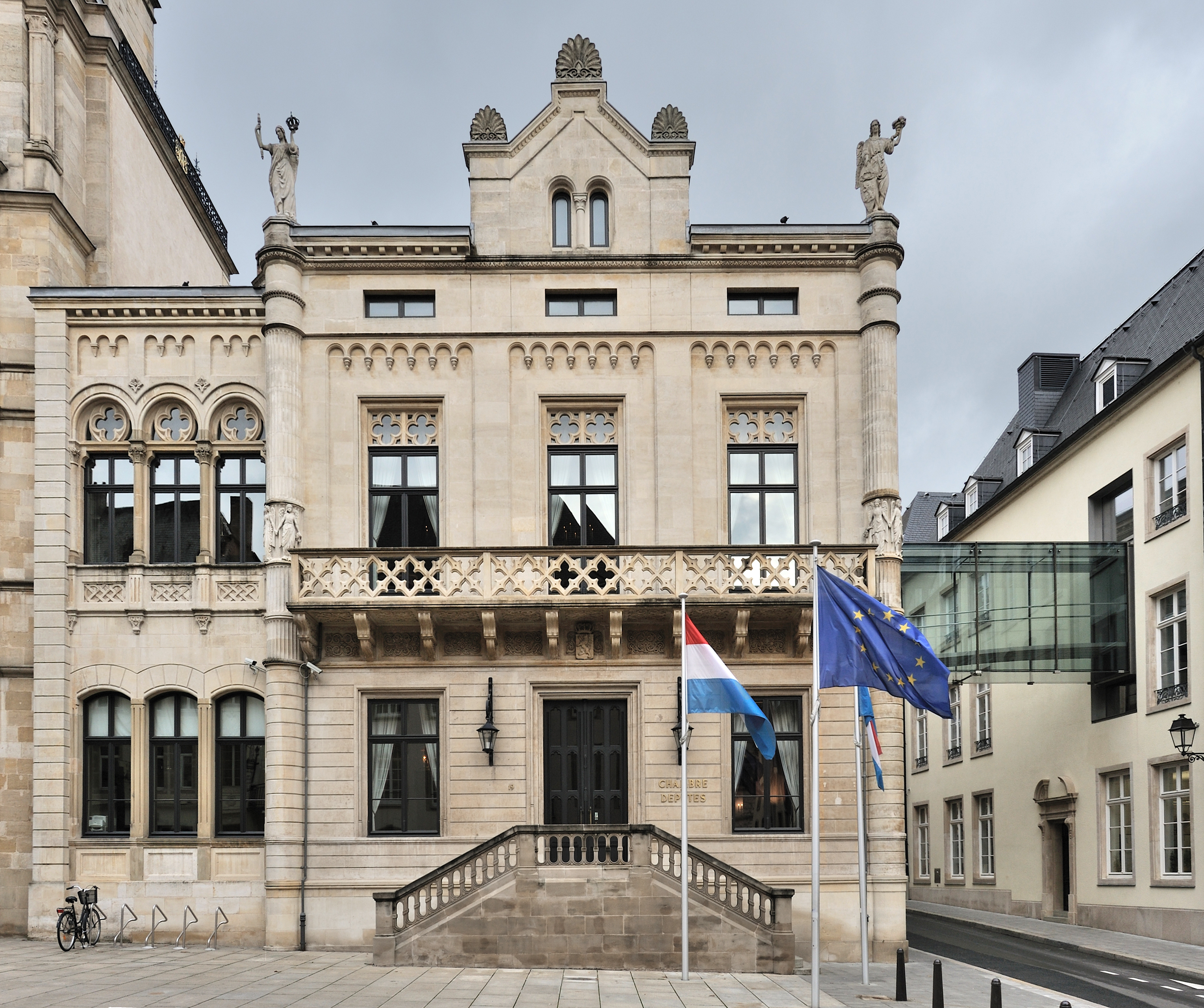
- Hôtel de la Chambre, Krautmaart, Luxembourg City

Website
- www.chd.lu

The Chamber of Deputies (Luxembourgish: Chamber vun den Deputéierten or simply D'Chamber, French: Chambre des Députés, German: Abgeordnetenkammer), abbreviated to the Chamber, is the unicameral national legislature of Luxembourg. The metonym Krautmaart (French: Marché aux herbes, English: "Herb Market") is sometimes used for the Chamber, after the square on which the Hôtel de la Chambre is located.

The Chamber is made up of 60 seats. Deputies are elected to serve five-year terms by proportional representation in four multi-seat constituencies. Voters may vote for as many candidates as the constituency elects deputies.

== History ==
=== 1800s ===
The constitution of 1841 created the Assembly of Estates (Assemblée des États), consisting of 34 members. Under the absolute monarchy of William II, King of the Netherlands and Grand Duke of Luxembourg, the legislature's powers were very restricted: it could not take decisions and had a purely advisory role with respect to the monarch. Its consent was necessary in very few matters. Only the sovereign could propose laws. The assembly was in session only 15 days a year, and these sessions were held in secret.

In a climate marked by the democratic revolutionary movements in France and elsewhere, a new constitution was drafted in 1848 by a Constituent Assembly. This introduced a constitutional monarchy: the King-Grand Duke retained only those powers specifically enumerated in the Constitution. The parliament, now called the Chambre des Députés, had the legislative power: it had the right to propose and amend laws. It would decide the budget and received the power to investigate. The government became accountable to the Chamber. In addition, its sessions were now public.

In 1853, William III called on the government to write a new constitution to limit the powers of the Chamber. The latter refused to approve the government's revisions, and the Grand Duke dissolved the legislature. There was then a brief return to absolutist monarchy, in what became known as the Putsch of 1856. The parliament, now renamed the Assemblée des Etats, retained its legislative powers, but the Grand Duke was no longer required to approve and promulgate its laws within a certain period. Taxes no longer had to be voted on annually, and the permanent budget was re-introduced. The Council of State was created in 1856 as a check on the Chamber. Its role was to render opinions on proposed bills and regulations.

After Luxembourg's neutrality and independence had been affirmed in the Second Treaty of London, in 1868, the constitution was revised to obtain a compromise between the liberties of 1848 and the authoritarian charter of 1856. The parliament was renamed the Chambre des Députés and regained most of the rights it lost in 1856, such as the annual vote on the budget and taxes. However, the King Grand-Duke still kept wide-ranging powers: he exercised executive power, and wielded legislative power alongside the Chamber.

=== World Wars ===
The constitutional changes of 1919 brought in universal suffrage and affirmed the principle of national sovereignty. These steps on a pathway of democratisation took place in a period of crisis of the monarchy, famine, and difficulties in supplying food. Grand Duchess Charlotte remained the Head of state, and the co-wielder of legislative power.

Most elections between 1922 and 1951 were partial elections. The four constituencies were paired up, North with Centre and South with East, and elections were staggered so that only deputies from one pair of constituencies were up for election at any given time.

During World War II, from 1940 to 1944 under German occupation of Luxembourg, the Chamber was dissolved by the Nazis and the country annexed into the "Gau Moselland". The Grand Ducal family and the Luxembourgish government went into exile, first in the United Kingdom, and later in Canada and the United States.

The first post-war session was opened on 6 December 1944 and was limited to one public sitting, as there was no quorum. A consultative assembly sat from March to August 1945, and new elections were held in October 1945. The post-war Chamber proceeded to revise the constitution again, which abolished the country's state of neutrality.

=== Since 1945 ===
1965 saw the introduction of parliamentary commissions. The establishment of specialised and permanent commissions would facilitate the work of the legislature. The previous organisation of the Chamber into sections, un-specialised and with members chosen at random, had not been effective. Another innovation concerned political groups. They were now officially recognised, and received premises, and subsidies based on their proportion of seat. These material means were dwarfed by those established in 1990.

Changes to the Chamber's rules in 1990 and 1991 substantially increased the material means available to political groups, and contributed to a professionalisation of politics. In addition, every Deputy had the right to an office close to the Chamber building. The Chamber reimbursed the Deputies' staff expenses. Funds were also made available to technical groups or "political sensibilities" of less than 5 deputies, following a notable incident at the start of the 1989-1990 session in which deputies from smaller parties (including future Deputy Prime Minister François Bausch) blocked access to the plenary hall to protest their disfavourable treatment.

In 2003, a new law established the office of the Mediator and Ombudsman. This was attached to the Chamber, but would not receive instructions from any authority in exercising his or her functions. They would deal with citizens' complaints concerning the central or local government administration, and other public entities. They would attempt to resolve disputes between parties, acting as a mediator. Every year, they would present a report to the Chamber.

Since January 2008, the political parties have been directly funded by the state. Their accounts were to be strictly separate from those of the parliamentary political groups. There were to be two different structures, each with their own staff. In order to receive public funds, a party must provide evidence of regular political activity, present complete lists of candidates at the legislative and European elections, and have received at least 2% of the vote.

== Functions ==
The function of the Chamber of Deputies is covered under Chapter IV of the Constitution of Luxembourg, the first article of which states that the purpose of the Chamber is to represent the country. Luxembourg is a parliamentary democracy, in which the Chamber is elected by universal suffrage under party-list proportional representation.

All laws must be passed by the Chamber. Each bill must in theory be submitted to two votes in the Chamber, with an interval of at least three months between the votes, for it to become law - the Chamber may, though, decide to forego this second vote, if the Council of State agrees to this. In practice, this occurs most of the time. Laws are passed by absolute majority, provided that a quorum of half of the deputies is present.

== Composition ==
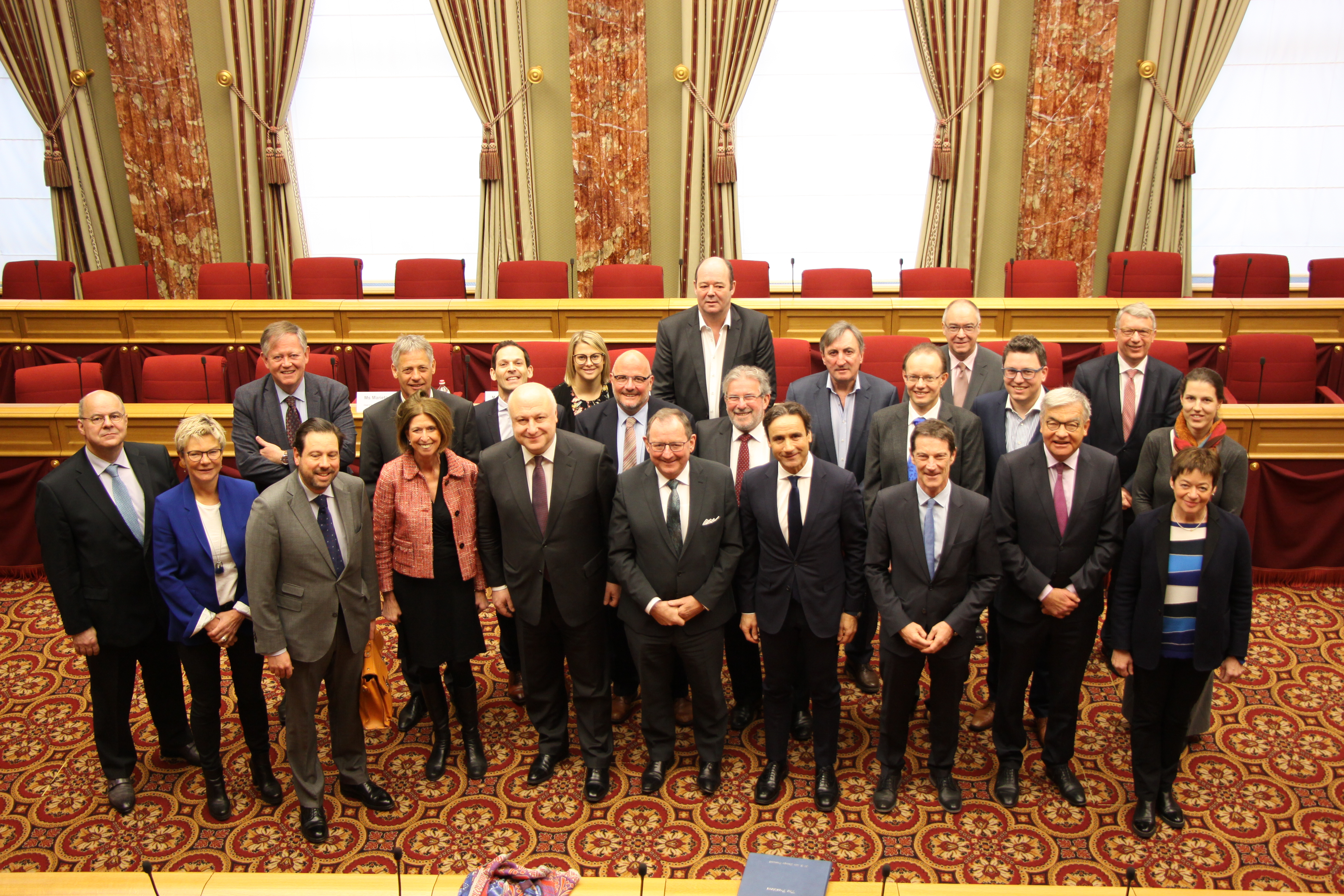
Group photo (not all Deputies)

The Chamber is composed of sixty members, called Deputies (Luxembourgish: Deputéiert; French: Députés). They each represent one of four constituencies, which are each a combination of at least two cantons. Each constituency elects a number of deputies proportionate to its population, with the largest electing 23 and the smallest electing 7.

Constituency	Cantons	MPs
Centre	Luxembourg, Mersch	21
East	Echternach, Grevenmacher, Remich	7
North	Clervaux, Diekirch, Redange, Vianden, Wiltz	9
South	Capellen, Esch-sur-Alzette	23

== Elections ==
=== Electoral system ===
Deputies are elected by universal suffrage every five years, with the last election having been held on 8 October 2023. Deputies are elected by open list proportional representation, whereby all electors may vote for as many candidates as their constituency has seats. Each party is allocated a number of seats in proportion to the total number of votes cast for its candidates in that constituency. These seats are then allocated to that party's candidates in descending order of votes that each candidate received.

=== Latest election ===
Party	Votes	%	Seats	+/–
Christian Social People's Party	1,099,427	29.21	21	0
Luxembourg Socialist Workers' Party	711,890	18.91	11	+1
Democratic Party	703,833	18.70	14	+2
Alternative Democratic Reform Party	348,990	9.27	5	+1
The Greens	321,895	8.55	4	–5
Pirate Party Luxembourg	253,554	6.74	3	+1
The Left	147,839	3.93	2	0
Fokus	93,839	2.49	0	New
Liberté - Fräiheet!	42,643	1.13	0	New
Communist Party of Luxembourg	24,275	0.64	0	0
The Conservatives	8,494	0.23	0	0
Volt Luxembourg	7,001	0.19	0	New
Total	3,763,680	100.00	60	0
Valid votes	231,344	92.55		
Invalid votes	10,735	4.29		
Blank votes	7,889	3.16		
Total votes	249,968	100.00		
Registered voters/turnout	286,711	87.18		
Source: Government of Luxembourg

== Hôtel de la Chambre ==
The Chamber of Deputies holds session in the Hôtel de la Chambre (Luxembourgish: Chambergebai, English: Hall of the Chamber of Deputies), located on a street known as the Krautmaart (French: rue du Marché-aux-herbes), in the Ville Haute, the oldest part of Luxembourg City. It was originally built between 1858 and 1860 as an annex to the Grand Ducal Palace, which had, until then, been used as one of many venues for the Chamber's convocations.

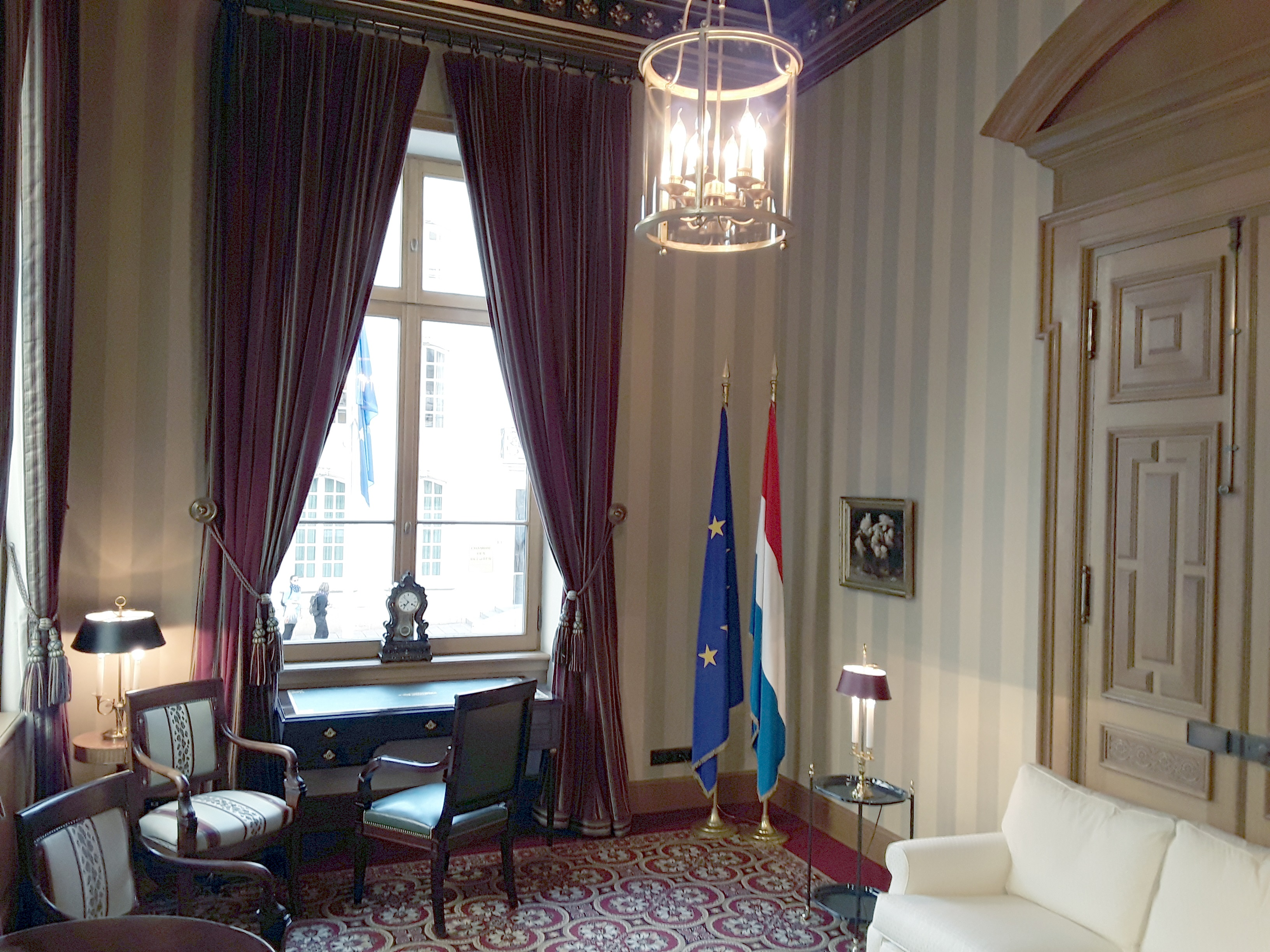

The building was designed by Antoine Hartmann in a unified historicist style, combining elements of neo-Gothic, neo-Renaissance, and neo-classical architectural styles. The Grand Ducal Palace, by contrast, was built over time in several architectural styles (primarily Renaissance and Baroque), but renovated in 1891 in a historicist neo-Renaissance manner. The large portrait of Grand Duke Guillaume, placed prominently on the wall of the plenary hall, was painted by British artist Andrew Gow.

== Current composition ==
Affiliation		Deputies
G	Christian Social People's Party (CSV)	21
G	Democratic Party (DP)	14
O	Luxembourg Socialist Workers' Party (LSAP)	12
O	Alternative Democratic Reform Party (ADR)	5
O	The Greens (Déi Gréng)	4
O	Pirate Party (Piratepartei)	2
O	The Left (Déi Lénk)	2
Total		60
Government Majority		10

Government parties are denoted with the letter G, with the Christian Social People's Party holding the office of Prime Minister (Luc Frieden). O stands for opposition.

The LSAP gained a seat on 19 September 2024 with the defection of Pirate Deputy Ben Polidori.

== Historical composition ==
=== Since 1945 ===
KPL / DL / DG / LSAP / PSD / PPLU / Others / DP / CSV / ADR
1945	5 / 11 / 1 / 9 / 25
1948	5 / 15 / 9 / 22
1951	4 / 19 / 8 / 21
1954	3 / 17 / 6 / 26
1959	3 / 17 / 11 / 21
1964	5 / 21 / 2 / 6 / 22
1968	6 / 18 / 11 / 21
1974	5 / 17 / 5 / 14 / 18
1979	2 / 14 / 2 / 2 / 15 / 24
1984	2 / 2 / 21 / 14 / 25
1989	1 / 4 / 18 / 11 / 22 / 4
1994	5 / 17 / 12 / 21 / 5
1999	1 / 5 / 13 / 15 / 19 / 7
2004	7 / 14 / 10 / 24 / 5
2009	1 / 7 / 13 / 9 / 26 / 4
2013	2 / 6 / 13 / 13 / 23 / 3
2018	2 / 9 / 10 / 2 / 12 / 21 / 4
2023	2 / 4 / 11 / 3 / 14 / 21 / 5

== Members ==
- List of members of the Chamber of Deputies of Luxembourg 2004–2009
- List of members of the Chamber of Deputies of Luxembourg 2009–2013
- List of members of the Chamber of Deputies of Luxembourg 2013–2018
- List of members of the Chamber of Deputies of Luxembourg 2018–2023
- List of members of the Chamber of Deputies of Luxembourg 2023–2028

== See also ==
- List of presidents of the Chamber of Deputies of Luxembourg
