= 1918 Luxembourg Constitutional Assembly election =

- 28 July 1918 (first round); 4 August 1918 (second round)
- 53 seats in the Constitutional Assembly; 27 seats needed for a majority
Party	Leader	Vote %	Seats	+/–
Liberal League		32.36	10	New
Socialist Party		26.86	12	New
Party of the Right	Émile Reuter	21.20	23	−2
IPP		11.22	5	New
PNI	Pierre Prüm	1.51	2	New
Independents	–	6.84	1	+1
This lists parties that won seats. See the complete results below.

Constitutional Assembly elections were held in Luxembourg on 28 July and 4 August 1918. The Party of the Right emerged as the largest party, winning 23 of the 53 seats. The Assembly was tasked with revising the constitution to democratise the country's political structure. The amendments were promulgated on 15 May 1919, introducing proportional representation and the option of holding referendums.

== Results ==
Party	First round			Second round			Total seats
Party	Votes	%	Seats	Votes	%	Seats	Total seats
Liberal League	51,476	32.36	4	28,451	43.51	6	10
Socialist Party	42,728	26.86	8	14,327	21.91	4	12
Party of the Right	33,715	21.20	20	13,641	20.86	3	23
Independent People's Party	17,850	11.22	3	5,455	8.34	2	5
Independent National Party	2,398	1.51	2				2
Independents	10,886	6.84	0	3,520	5.38	1	1
Total	159,053	100.00	37	65,394	100.00	16	53
Valid votes	28,420	98.74					
Invalid/blank votes	363	1.26					
Total votes	28,783	100.00		17,032	–		
Registered voters/turnout	34,078	84.46		21,662	78.63		
Source: Nohlen & Stöver, Luxemburger Wort, Luxemburger Wort

=== By canton ===
Canton	Seats	Party	Candidate	First round	Second round
Canton	Seats	Party	Candidate	Votes	Votes
Capellen	3	Liberal League	Jacques Schmitz	1,219	
Capellen	3	Party of the Right	Nicolas Wirtgen	1,152	
Capellen	3	Liberal League	Edouard Hemmer	1,132	1,193
Capellen	3	Party of the Right	Pierre Dupong	1,125	1,133
Capellen	3	Party of the Right	Kirsch	1,121	
Capellen	3	Liberal League	Jeitz	1,037	
Capellen	3	Turnout		2,305	2,349
Capellen	3	Electorate		2,497	2,474
Clervaux	3	Independent National Party	Pierre Prüm	1,249	
Clervaux	3	Independent National Party	Théodore Boever	1,149	
Clervaux	3	Party of the Right	J.-P. Jérôme Thinnes	821	742
Clervaux	3	Party of the Right	Hubert Loutsch	791	495
Clervaux	3	Liberal League	Théodore Arthur Bouvier	746	
Clervaux	3	Party of the Right	Kesseler	542	
Clervaux	3	Turnout		1,871	1,251
Clervaux	3	Electorate		2,074	2,056
Diekirch	4	Party of the Right	Antoine Hansen	1,462	
Diekirch	4	Party of the Right	Matthias Jungers	1,350	
Diekirch	4	Party of the Right	Jean Gérard	1,304	
Diekirch	4	Independent	Nicolas Kellen	1,185	1,258
Diekirch	4	Party of the Right	Jean Pierre Schmit	1,187	1,170
Diekirch	4	Liberal League	Auguste Hein	1,066	
Diekirch	4	Liberal League	Peter John	757	
Diekirch	4	Liberal League	Nicolas Fressch	720	
Diekirch	4	Turnout		2,478	2,452
Diekirch	4	Electorate		2,744	2,728
Echternach	2	Party of the Right	Matthias Huss	988	
Echternach	2	Party of the Right	Lamoral de Villers	828	
Echternach	2	Liberal League	Salentiny	595	
Echternach	2	Turnout		1,418	
Echternach	2	Electorate		1,636	
Esch-sur-Alzette	15	Socialist Party	Joseph Thorn	3,974	
Esch-sur-Alzette	15	Socialist Party	Pierre Krier	3,949	
Esch-sur-Alzette	15	Socialist Party	Émile Mark	3,899	
Esch-sur-Alzette	15	Independent People's Party	Bernard Herschbach	3,882	
Esch-sur-Alzette	15	Independent People's Party	Pierre Kappweiler	3,861	
Esch-sur-Alzette	15	Socialist Party	René Blum	3,817	
Esch-sur-Alzette	15	Independent People's Party	Théodore Noesen	3,700	
Esch-sur-Alzette	15	Socialist Party	Adolphe Krieps	3,393	
Esch-sur-Alzette	15	Socialist Party	Jean Schaack-Wirth	3,291	
Esch-sur-Alzette	15	Socialist Party	Joseph Kieffer	3,237	3,212
Esch-sur-Alzette	15	Socialist Party	Jacques Schaack	3,266	3,181
Esch-sur-Alzette	15	Socialist Party	Edouard Leon	2,925	3,014
Esch-sur-Alzette	15	Independent People's Party	Jean-Pierre Glesener	3,255	2,806
Esch-sur-Alzette	15	Socialist Party	Jacques Thilmany	2,895	2,657
Esch-sur-Alzette	15	Independent People's Party	Matthias Vinandy	3,152	2,649
Esch-sur-Alzette	15	Liberal League	Charles-Léon Metz	2,286	2,531
Esch-sur-Alzette	15	Liberal League	Aloyse Kayser	2,589	2,520
Esch-sur-Alzette	15	Liberal League	Albert Clemang	2,341	2,298
Esch-sur-Alzette	15	Independent	Baron Charles Jacquinot	2,299	2,262
Esch-sur-Alzette	15	Liberal League	François Theisen	2,272	2,181
Esch-sur-Alzette	15	Liberal League	Charles Krombach	2,216	2,173
Esch-sur-Alzette	15	Liberal League	Auguste Flesch	2,153	
Esch-sur-Alzette	15	Liberal League	Jacques Laux	2,027	
Esch-sur-Alzette	15	Liberal League	Charles Hoffmann	2,004	
Esch-sur-Alzette	15	Independent	Antoine Gilles	1,987	
Esch-sur-Alzette	15	Independent	Jean-Pierre Bour	1,967	
Esch-sur-Alzette	15	Liberal League	Edmond Müller	1,963	
Esch-sur-Alzette	15	Liberal League	Jean Witry	1,443	
Esch-sur-Alzette	15	Liberal League	Pierre Deloos	1,349	
Esch-sur-Alzette	15	Liberal League	Victor Wilhelm	1,251	
Esch-sur-Alzette	15	Turnout		6,668	6,198
Esch-sur-Alzette	15	Electorate		8,452	8,589
Grevenmacher	3	Party of the Right	François Altwies	1,230	
Grevenmacher	3	Party of the Right	Albert Dühr	1,172	
Grevenmacher	3	Party of the Right	Joseph Bech	1,095	
Grevenmacher	3	Independent	Auguste Keiffer	1,085	
Grevenmacher	3	Turnout		2,091	
Grevenmacher	3	Electorate		2,350	
Luxembourg-Ville	4	Socialist Party	Jean-Pierre Probst	1,365	
Luxembourg-Ville	4	Socialist Party	Luc Housse	1,341	
Luxembourg-Ville	4	Liberal League	Robert Brasseur	1,204	
Luxembourg-Ville	4	Liberal League	Léandre Lacroix	1,156	
Luxembourg-Ville	4	Socialist Party	Eugène Welter	786	
Luxembourg-Ville	4	Turnout		1,988	
Luxembourg-Ville	4	Electorate		2,618	
Luxembourg-Campagne	8	Liberal League	Maurice Pescatore	2,406	
Luxembourg-Campagne	8	Liberal League	Gaston Diderich	2,284	2,460
Luxembourg-Campagne	8	Liberal League	Joseph Palgen	2,183	2,431
Luxembourg-Campagne	8	Liberal League	Jacques Gallé	2,108	2,414
Luxembourg-Campagne	8	Liberal League	Paul Koch	2,079	2,408
Luxembourg-Campagne	8	Liberal League	Léon Naval	1,876	2,161
Luxembourg-Campagne	8	Party of the Right	Nicolas Mackel	2,042	2,154
Luxembourg-Campagne	8	Party of the Right	Nicolas Jacoby	2,044	2,153
Luxembourg-Campagne	8	Party of the Right	Jean-Pierre Colling	1,862	2,003
Luxembourg-Campagne	8	Party of the Right	Jean Thill	1,799	1,936
Luxembourg-Campagne	8	Liberal League	Jean-Pierre Schiltz	1,604	1,869
Luxembourg-Campagne	8	Party of the Right	Pierre Entringer	1,717	1,855
Luxembourg-Campagne	8	Liberal League	Jean Nickels	1,433	1,812
Luxembourg-Campagne	8	Socialist Party	Louis Emeringer	1,163	1,164
Luxembourg-Campagne	8	Socialist Party	Jean-Pierre Rasquin	1,204	1,099
Luxembourg-Campagne	8	Socialist Party	Henri Schreiber	1,149	
Luxembourg-Campagne	8	Socialist Party	Michel Schettlé	1,114	
Luxembourg-Campagne	8	Independent	Jean Schambourg	796	
Luxembourg-Campagne	8	Independent	Joseph Kayser	733	
Luxembourg-Campagne	8	Independent	Clerf	508	
Luxembourg-Campagne	8	Turnout		4,777	4,782
Luxembourg-Campagne	8	Electorate		5,724	5,815
Mersch	2	Party of the Right	Alphonse Eichhorn	971	
Mersch	2	Party of the Right	Jean-Pierre Ecker	889	
Mersch	2	Liberal League	Leibfried	718	
Mersch	2	Liberal League	Pescatore	657	
Mersch	2	Turnout		1,669	
Mersch	2	Electorate		1,789	
Redange	3	Party of the Right	Eugène Hoffmann	Elected unopposed	
Redange	3	Party of the Right	Nicolas Klein	Elected unopposed	
Redange	3	Party of the Right	Pierre Schiltz	Elected unopposed	
Remich	2	Party of the Right	Adolphe Klein	1,145	
Remich	2	Party of the Right	Auguste Thorn	1,091	
Remich	2	Liberal League	Jules Kohn	437	
Remich	2	Party of the Right	Théodore Flammang	379	
Remich	2	Turnout		1,692	
Remich	2	Electorate		1,915	
Vianden	1	Party of the Right	Egide Petges	216	
Vianden	1	Liberal League	Sinner	164	
Vianden	1	Turnout		389	
Vianden	1	Electorate		407	
Wiltz	3	Party of the Right	Nicolas Meyers	1,172	
Wiltz	3	Party of the Right	Émile Reuter	1,125	
Wiltz	3	Party of the Right	Charles Buffet	1,095	
Wiltz	3	Independent	Albert Meyer	326	
Wiltz	3	Turnout		1,437	
Wiltz	3	Electorate		1,872	
Source: Luxemburger Wort, Luxemburger Wort, Luxemburger Wort
