= Bech Ministry =

Government of Luxembourg, 1926–1937

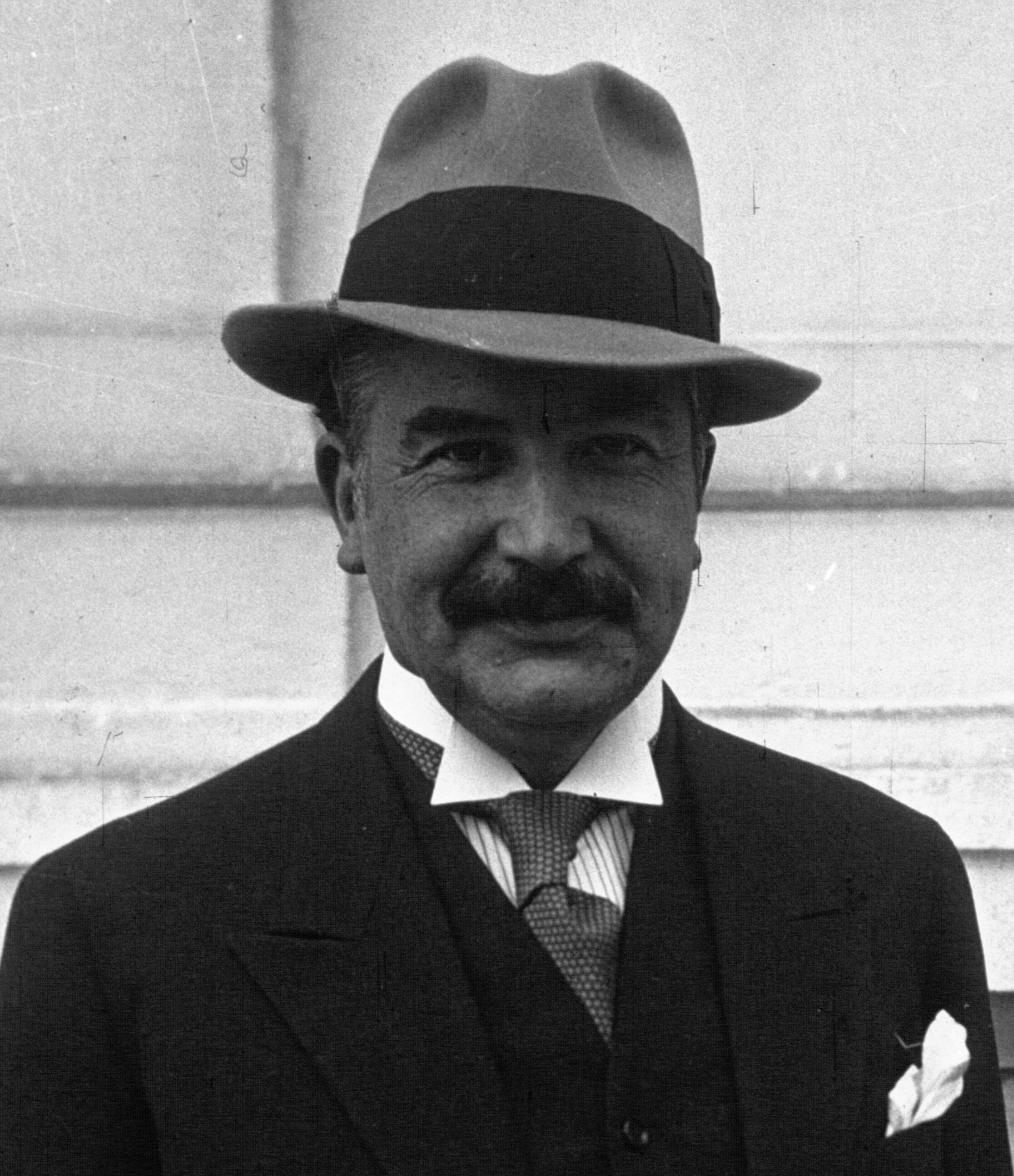
Joseph Bech

The Bech Ministry was the government of Luxembourg that came into office in Luxembourg on 16 July 1926 after the resignation of the Prüm Ministry, and was headed by Joseph Bech. It was reshuffled on 11 April 1932 and on 27 December 1936. It stepped down after the referendum on the so-called Maulkuerfgesetz ("muzzle law"), in which the majority of voters decided against the law.

== Formation ==
After the Prüm government's resignation, the Grand Duchess had initially intended to confide the formation of a government to Hubert Loutsch, already a former prime minister. However, the man associated with the "coup d’état" of 1915 was unacceptable in the eyes of the left. Joseph Bech was chosen in the end. A pragmatic conservative, he managed to rapidly reach an agreement with the liberals. The coalition between the Party of the Right and the liberal movement lasted until 1937. The partial elections of 3 June 1928, 7 June 1931 and of 3 June 1934, did not change the power relations, although there were several ministerial reshuffles. On 11 April 1932, Albert Clemang resigned during the debates on the nationalisation of certain railway networks in which he had personal interests. He was replaced by Étienne Schmit. In late 1936, the professor Nicolas Braunshausen, a future president of the Radical Liberal Party, took over from Norbert Dumont.

== Foreign policy ==
After World War I, the main priority of Luxembourgish foreign policy was to assure the security of the Grand Duchy in the new organisation of Europe. Situated as it was between the two great military powers of the continent, France and Germany, the country would risk seeing its existence endangered in the event of a new conflict between its neighbours. The warming of Franco-German relations since the Locarno Conference in 1925 was a positive sign. The Locarno Treaties provided for countries' security to be guaranteed by the development of procedures to resolve international differences peacefully. The Luxembourgish government profited from these dispositions to conclude a number of treaties of conciliation and arbitration with other countries. It signed treaties with Belgium and France in 1927; Spain and Poland in 1928; Portugal, Germany, Switzerland, the Netherlands, Czechoslovakia and the United States in 1929; Romania in 1930 and, finally, Italy and Norway in 1932.

Joseph Bech instituted a policy of maintaining a more active presence on the international scene. He regularly participated in meetings of the League of Nations in Geneva. He was present at the Conference on Disarmament in The Hague in 1932, and took part in meetings of the Oslo Alliance, which contained the smaller states, Norway, Sweden, Denmark, Finland, the Netherlands, Belgium, and Luxembourg. From 1927, the Grand Duchy ratified most of the treaties signed under the auspices of the League of Nations. The Luxembourgish government also adhered to the Pact of Paris, in which the signatory countries agreed to renounce war as an instrument of policy, and to the plan of Aristide Briand, who proposed a federal European Union in 1930. In a note in 1937, Joseph Bech explained Luxembourg's interest in participating in the Concert of Nations: "Before the war, neutrality was synonymous with total abstention. Since the creation of the League of Nations, the situation has changed. The small countries have, thanks to Geneva, a podium from which their voice can be hear from afar. Whatever may be the flaws of this institution, it constitutes for the small states, whether they are armed or disarmed like us, the sole safeguard against abuses of power."

Luxembourg's active participation in the work of the League of Nations did not signify that it was abandoning neutrality, however. For the politicians of the inter-war period, maintaining this regime seemed the only means of guaranteeing the security of the country and avoiding being caught up in a war. Joseph Bech missed no opportunity to underline that "the collaboration which it [the Grand Duchy] may bring to the great work of Geneva shall not constitute a modification of its constitutional and conventional policy of neutrality".

When he arrived at the Ministry of Foreign Affairs, Joseph Bech was confronted with the worrying deterioration of Belgo-Luxembourgish relations. The Belgium–Luxembourg Economic Union (UEBL), concluded in 1921, had got off to a bad start. On the Luxembourgish side, the memory of Belgian annexationism was still alive. On the Belgian side, the Prüm government's overtly displayed sympathies for the French had caused displeasure. During his whole time in office, the foreign minister tried to re-establish these relations with Belgium.

== Economic policy ==
The economic fluctuations of the inter-war period sorely put the UEBL to the test. Above all, the monetary policy of the Belgian partners caused constant concerns to the Luxembourgish government. On 25 October 1926, the Belgian government devalued the Belgian franc, to which the Luxembourgish franc was attached. Luxembourgish currency experienced the first devaluation in its history. The director-general of Finances, Pierre Dupong, immediately took measures to stabilise the franc, by aligning it with the pound sterling (decrees of 27 August and 27 October 1927). He then sought advice abroad, consulting the president of the Reichsbank, Hjalmar Schacht, on the possibility of setting up an autonomous monetary system. This resulted in the law 19 December 1929, which aimed to give the Luxembourgish franc a solid foundation, by defining it in relation to gold, and by creating a gold reserve. However, in late March 1935, the Belgian government, headed by Paul van Zeeland proceeded with another major devaluation of Belgian currency. While in Belgium, financial and economic difficulties justified such a measure, in Luxembourg, the public finances were balanced, and export industries such as steel benefited from this. The Luxembourgish government decided to only follow the Belgian devaluation of 28% with their own devaluation of 10%. In effect, Dupong refused to dispossess small investors and to effectively cut salaries through a too strong devaluation. From this moment and until 1944, the Luxembourgish franc was worth 1,25 Belgian francs. The abandonment of parity with Belgian currency complicated financial operations and disadvantaged Luxembourgish exports relative to international competition.

After the depression of the immediate post-war period, the Luxembourgish economy saw a phase of expansion from 1924 et 1929. The increase in financial and economic activity – 829 new companies were founded from 1919 to 1928 – required the creation of a stock exchange. The law of 30 December 1927 authorised the creation of a stock exchange. Its first session took place on 6 May 1929. The Bech government also introduced legislation on financial holding companies. This had little effect at the time, but, in the 1970s, was to be one of the decisive factors in the growth of the financial services industry. The law of 31 July 1929 provided the holding companies with a very favourable fiscal framework.

From 1930, the international crisis triggered by the Wall Street crash of 1929, also affected Luxembourg and Belgium. Production and exports started to collapse. The crisis inevitably had repercussions for the functioning of the UEBL, as it provoked a return to protectionism in all countries. Belgium and Luxembourg each put in place protective measures without notifying the other: a quota for certain products, import licences, etc. An economic border was established again between the two countries. The rapid degradation of bilateral relations forced the two governments to start negotiations. On 23 May 1935, a group of treaties were signed in Brussels, which provided a solution to the deadlock. These agreements reaffirmed the principle at the root of the UEBL, namely free trade between the two countries, and instituted an administrative commission, composed in equal measure of Luxembourgers and Belgians, which became an essential instrument for Belgo-Luxembourgish cooperation. The agreements of 1935 also dealt with a number of monetary questions, and put a cap on the circulation of Luxembourgish currency in the Grand Duchy. During the negotiations, the Luxembourgish government succeeded in obtaining numerous concessions for agriculture in the Grand Duchy. Joseph Bech, who was also the Minister for Agriculture, wanted to protect this sector, which remained one of the pillars of Luxembourgish society (employing 30% of the active population in 1935) and which was the main electoral base of the Party of the Right. However, these protective measures were to postpone necessary structural reforms, and made it all the more difficult to adapt to the international market.

== Social policy ==
Although the crisis of the 1930s caused a slowdown in the Luxembourgish economy, the rate of unemployment remained relatively low: a maximum of 2,159 job-seekers in 1933. This was mostly due to the government's immigration policy. While foreigners constituted 40% of the steel industry's workforce in 1929, this had decreased to 10% by 1935. In the meantime, a large number of foreign workers were laid off, and sent back to their country of origin. Foreign workers played the role of a "safety valve".

However, while the crisis' effects on unemployment were softened, it had grave consequences for purchasing power. In the 1930s, the question of workers' salaries was again at the centre of social debate. The government advocated moderation and feared that a social policy that was too generous would damage the competitiveness of Luxembourgish industry. Business-owners refused all negotiation on the question of salaries. The social struggle heated up in December 1935 when the government postponed the vote on a law that provided for the introduction of collective bargaining, and the creation of an organ of arbitration. The Christian and socialist trade unions united to mobilise the masses, demanding an increase in salaries and legal recognition of the unions. On 12 January 1936, a large protest attracted 40,000 participants. The Bech government decided to back off. A Grand-Ducal decree on 23 January 1936 created the National Labour Council, an arbitration organ which contained, under the direction of the government and on equal basis, representatives of business-owners and workers. The same year, article 310 of the penal code was abolished, and a law guaranteed union rights.

The social policy of the Minister for Social Welfare and for Work, Pierre Dupong, drew its inspiration from the Church's social doctrine, as defined in the encyclicals Rerum Novarum and Quadragesimo Anno. It rejected the socialist concept of class struggle. It was concerned with bringing about harmonious labour relations, by creating organs for conciliation and arbitration, and with achieving an improvement of workers' condition by prudent reforms.

The Bech government, in which Pierre Dupong represented the Christian social wing, had always attached great importance to the question of housing. Allowing workers or employees to become house owners seemed the most certain means of preventing workers' political radicalisation. The government also favoured the construction of individual houses instead of the collective rented housing that was so frequent in social accommodation. In 1929, it created the Service for Popular Housing which was attached to the National Society for Cheap Homes. This body allocated loans at a reduced interest rate for the acquisition of cheap housing, and for the hygienic improvement of homes. Numerous families received advantageous conditions. Until 1940, the Service funded more than 2000 new buildings.

== Domestic policy ==
The crisis of the 1930s gave an impetus to the Communist Party, which had been born from the split of the Socialist Party in 1921. Revolutionary ideas gained in popularity among workers in the mining basin, causing concern in conservative circles. As a young Deputy, Joseph Bech had witnessed the unrest of 1917 to 1921, and this had left a profound impression on him. The Prime Minister was also influenced by authoritarian an corporatist tendencies which were growing in his own party, especially through the intermediary of Jean-Baptiste Esch, a young writer for the Luxemburger Wort.

When the Communists achieved their first electoral successes and in 1934 managed to get their general secretary Zénon Bernard elected to the Chamber of Deputies, Bech decided to act. The Chamber invalidated the election of the Communist Deputy under the pretext that as a revolutionary, he could not swear an oath on the Constitution. In his role as Minister of Education, Joseph Bech had two teachers who were also Communist Party members removed from their jobs. The government then prepared a bill "for the defence of political and social order", outlawing membership of any group whose "activity aimed to abolish or change the Constitution through violence or any other illicit means". The text was above all aimed at the Communist Party. In April 1937, the bill was passed by a large majority: 34 Deputies of the right and liberals, against 19 Deputies of the left and 1 abstention.

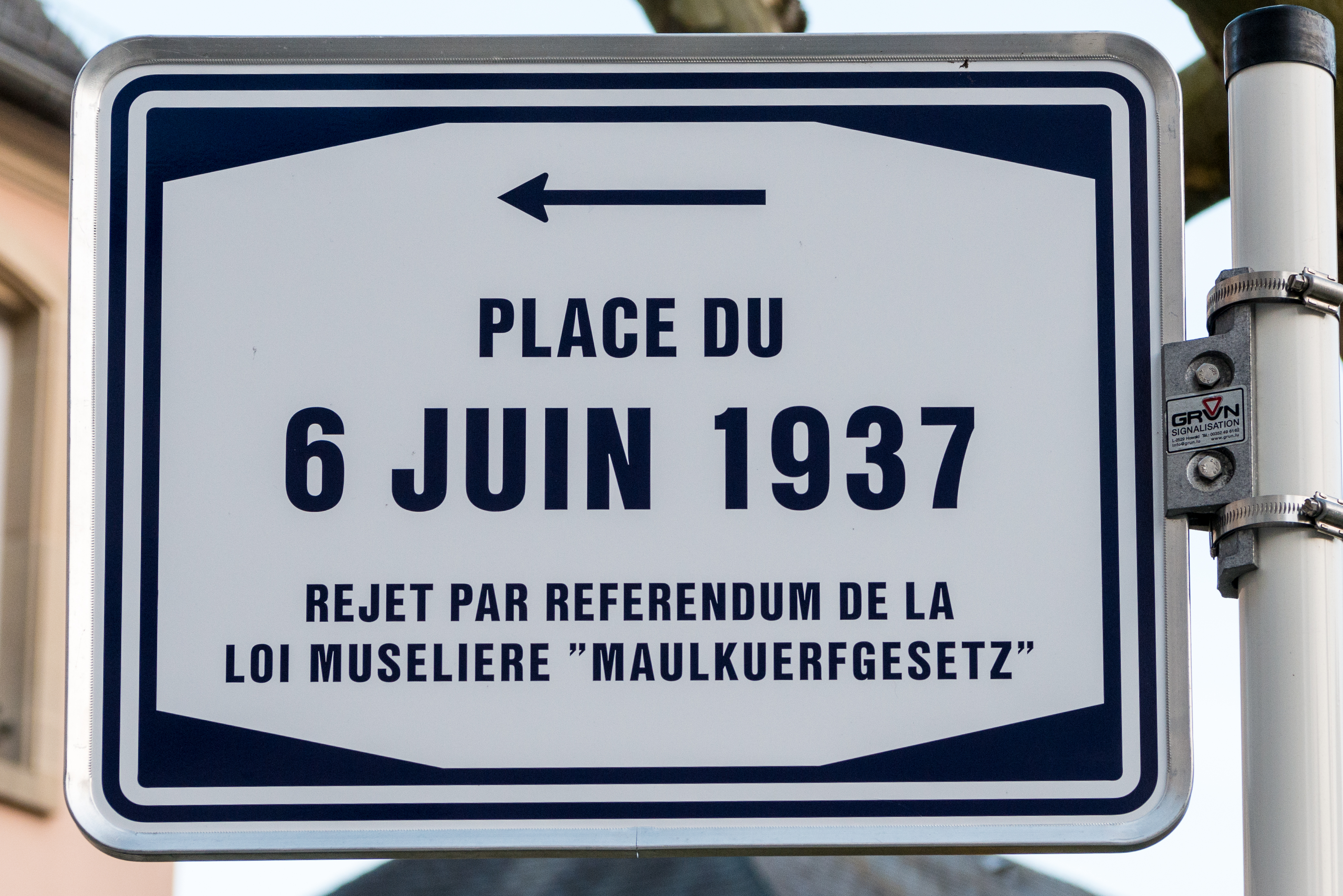
Street named for the referendum on the Maulkuerfgesetz

However, the law, termed the Maulkuerfgesetz by its opponents, ran into strong opposition outside parliament orchestrated by the Workers' Party, the unions and young liberals, who saw in this measure an attack on freedom of opinion. Believing that he had popular backing, Bech agreed to put the law to a referendum, at the same time as the legislative elections of 6 June 1937 in the Nord and Centre constituencies. To great surprise, 50,67% of electors voted "No". The Party of the Right managed to keep hold of all its seats in the elections, but the liberals experienced significant losses. The socialists were the winners of the election. Even though a continuation of the government coalition would have been theoretically possible, with 31 seats out of 55, Bech felt himself repudiated, and tendered his resignation.

== Composition ==
=== 16 July 1926 to 11 April 1932 ===
- Joseph Bech (Party of the Right): Minister of State, head of government, Director-General of Foreign Affairs, Education and Agriculture
- Norbert Dumont: Director-General of Justice and the Interior
- Albert Clemang (List of the left parties): Director-General for Public Works, Trade and Industry
- Pierre Dupong (Party of the Right): Director-General of Finance, Social Security and Labor

=== 11 April 1932 to 27 December 1936 ===
- Joseph Bech (Party of the Right): Minister of State, head of government, Director-General of Foreign Affairs, Education and Agriculture
- Norbert Dumont: Director-General for Justice and the Interior
- Pierre Dupong (Party of the Right): Director-General of Finance, Social Security and Labor
- Étienne Schmit (Liberals): Director-General of Public Works, Trade and Industry

=== 27 December 1936 to 5 November 1937 ===
- Joseph Bech (Party of the Right): Minister of State, head of government, Minister of Foreign Affairs, Education and Agriculture
- Pierre Dupong (Party of the Right): Minister of Finance, Social Security and Labor
- Étienne Schmit (Liberals): Minister of Justice and Public Works
- Nicolas Braunshausen (Liberals): Minister of the Interior, Trade and Industry
