= 1922 Luxembourg general election =

- 28 May 1922
- 25 out of 48 seats in the Chamber of Deputies; 25 seats needed for a majority
Party	Leader	Vote %	Seats	+/–
Party of the Right	Émile Reuter	50.12	26	−1
Liberal–Democratic List		23.81	9	+2
Socialist Party		10.82	6	−2
PNI	Pierre Prüm	14.24	4	+1
IPP	–		2	0
Independent Left	Othon Decker	–	1	0
This lists parties that won seats. See the complete results below.
Results by constituency
Prime Minister before	Prime Minister after
Émile Reuter; Party of the Right	Émile Reuter; Party of the Right

Partial general elections were held in Luxembourg on 28 May 1922, electing 25 of the 48 seats in the Chamber of Deputies in the centre and north of the country. The Party of the Right won 13 of the 25 seats, but saw its total number of seats fall from 27 to 26.

== Results ==
Party	Votes	%	Seats			
Party	Votes	%	Not up	Elected	Total	+/–
Party of the Right	342,734	50.12	13	13	26	–1
Liberal–Democratic List	162,790	23.81	3	6	9	+2
Independent National Party	97,371	14.24	0	4	4	+1
Socialist Party	73,963	10.82	4	2	6	–2
Communist Party of Luxembourg	6,976	1.02	0	0	0	New
Independent People's Party			2	–	2	0
Independent Left			1	–	1	0
Total	683,834	100.00	23	25	48	0
Source: Nohlen & Stöver

=== By constituency ===
Constituency	Seats	Turnout	Party	Votes	Seats won
Centre	13	29,960	Party of the Right	166,084	6
Centre	13	29,960	Liberal–Democratic List	162,790	6
Centre	13	29,960	Socialist Party	49,084	1
Centre	13	29,960	Communist Party	6,976	0
Nord	12		Party of the Right	176,670	7
Nord	12		Independent National Party	97,271	4
Nord	12		Socialist Party	24,879	1
Source: Escher Tageblatt, 31 May 1922
