= 1915 Luxembourg general election =

- 23 December 1915
- 52 seats in the Chamber of Deputies; 26 seats needed for a majority
| Party | Leader | Vote % | Seats |
|---|---|---|---|
| Left Bloc | | 55.4 | 27 |
| Party of the Right | | 26.5 | 25 |
This lists parties that won seats. See the complete results below.

General elections were held in Luxembourg on 23 December 1915. The Party of the Right emerged as the largest party, winning 25 of the 52 seats in the Chamber of Deputies.

== Background ==
Earlier in the year Grand Duchess Marie-Adélaïde had appointed a right-wing minority government. However, the government was unable to function properly due to its lack of a majority in the Chamber of Deputies. Marie-Adélaïde then dissolved the Chamber and called new elections.

== Results ==
| Party | Votes | % | Seats | +/– |
|---|---|---|---|---|
| Left Bloc | 92,302 | 55.43 | 27 | –5 |
| Party of the Right | 44,195 | 26.54 | 25 | +5 |
| Independents | 30,012 | 18.02 | 0 | – |
| Total | 166,509 | 100.00 | 52 | 0 |
| Valid votes | 30,133 | 99.15 | | |
| Invalid/blank votes | 257 | 0.85 | | |
| Total votes | 30,390 | 100.00 | | |
| Registered voters/turnout | 33,643 | 90.33 | | |
Source: Luxemburger Wort

=== By canton ===
| Canton | Seats | Electorate | Turnout | Party | Candidate | Votes |
|---|---|---|---|---|---|---|
| Capellen | 3 | 2,027 | 1,887 | Party of the Right | Pierre Dupong | 963 |
| Capellen | 3 | 2,027 | 1,887 | Left Bloc | Edouard Hemmer | 962 |
| Capellen | 3 | 2,027 | 1,887 | Party of the Right | Nicolas Wirtgen | 954 |
| Capellen | 3 | 2,027 | 1,887 | Party of the Right | Kirsch | 931 |
| Capellen | 3 | 2,027 | 1,887 | Left Bloc | Schmitz | 915 |
| Capellen | 3 | 2,027 | 1,887 | Left Bloc | Jeitz | 840 |
| Clervaux | 3 | 1,995 | 1,758 | Party of the Right | Pierre Prüm | 1,244 |
| Clervaux | 3 | 1,995 | 1,758 | Party of the Right | J.-P. Jérôme Thinnes | 1,236 |
| Clervaux | 3 | 1,995 | 1,758 | Party of the Right | Jean Theissen | 1,124 |
| Clervaux | 3 | 1,995 | 1,758 | Left Bloc | Glesener | 578 |
| Clervaux | 3 | 1,995 | 1,758 | Left Bloc | Bouvier | 537 |
| Clervaux | 3 | 1,995 | 1,758 | Left Bloc | Hamelius | 533 |
| Diekirch | 4 | 2,590 | 2,398 | Party of the Right | Antoine Hansen | 1,403 |
| Diekirch | 4 | 2,590 | 2,398 | Party of the Right | Matthias Jungers | 1,231 |
| Diekirch | 4 | 2,590 | 2,398 | Party of the Right | Jean Gérard | 1,226 |
| Diekirch | 4 | 2,590 | 2,398 | Party of the Right | Jean Pierre Schmit | 1,225 |
| Diekirch | 4 | 2,590 | 2,398 | Left Bloc | Pemmers | 1,063 |
| Diekirch | 4 | 2,590 | 2,398 | Left Bloc | Steichen | 1,003 |
| Diekirch | 4 | 2,590 | 2,398 | Left Bloc | Wanderscheid | 919 |
| Diekirch | 4 | 2,590 | 2,398 | Independent | Kellen | 598 |
| Echternach | 3 | 1,573 | 1,448 | Party of the Right | Matthias Huss | 903 |
| Echternach | 3 | 1,573 | 1,448 | Party of the Right | François Kries | 826 |
| Echternach | 3 | 1,573 | 1,448 | Party of the Right | Lamoral de Villers | 733 |
| Echternach | 3 | 1,573 | 1,448 | Left Bloc | Dondelinger | 664 |
| Echternach | 3 | 1,573 | 1,448 | Left Bloc | Decker | 560 |
| Echternach | 3 | 1,573 | 1,448 | Left Bloc | Huss | 142 |
| Esch-sur-Alzette | 13 | 7,104 | 6,353 | Left Bloc | Léon Metz | 3,998 |
| Esch-sur-Alzette | 13 | 7,104 | 6,353 | Left Bloc | Albert Clemang | 3,958 |
| Esch-sur-Alzette | 13 | 7,104 | 6,353 | Left Bloc | Charles Hoffmann | 3,872 |
| Esch-sur-Alzette | 13 | 7,104 | 6,353 | Left Bloc | Charles Krombach | 3,861 |
| Esch-sur-Alzette | 13 | 7,104 | 6,353 | Left Bloc | Auguste Flesch | 3,840 |
| Esch-sur-Alzette | 13 | 7,104 | 6,353 | Left Bloc | Léon Metzer | 3,825 |
| Esch-sur-Alzette | 13 | 7,104 | 6,353 | Left Bloc | Émile Mark | 3,803 |
| Esch-sur-Alzette | 13 | 7,104 | 6,353 | Left Bloc | Edmond Müller | 3,781 |
| Esch-sur-Alzette | 13 | 7,104 | 6,353 | Left Bloc | Aloyse Kayser | 3,758 |
| Esch-sur-Alzette | 13 | 7,104 | 6,353 | Left Bloc | Jean-Pierre Michels | 3,742 |
| Esch-sur-Alzette | 13 | 7,104 | 6,353 | Left Bloc | Jean Schortgen | 3,698 |
| Esch-sur-Alzette | 13 | 7,104 | 6,353 | Left Bloc | Joseph Thorn | 3,686 |
| Esch-sur-Alzette | 13 | 7,104 | 6,353 | Left Bloc | Michel Welter | 3,555 |
| Esch-sur-Alzette | 13 | 7,104 | 6,353 | Independent | Dondelinger | 2,644 |
| Esch-sur-Alzette | 13 | 7,104 | 6,353 | Independent | Auguste Collart | 2,320 |
| Esch-sur-Alzette | 13 | 7,104 | 6,353 | Independent | Steichen | 2,309 |
| Esch-sur-Alzette | 13 | 7,104 | 6,353 | Independent | Hausemer | 2,245 |
| Esch-sur-Alzette | 13 | 7,104 | 6,353 | Independent | Klepper | 2,227 |
| Esch-sur-Alzette | 13 | 7,104 | 6,353 | Independent | Théodore Noesen | 2,221 |
| Esch-sur-Alzette | 13 | 7,104 | 6,353 | Independent | Gehrend | 2,213 |
| Esch-sur-Alzette | 13 | 7,104 | 6,353 | Independent | Meintz | 2,196 |
| Esch-sur-Alzette | 13 | 7,104 | 6,353 | Independent | Goedert | 2,194 |
| Esch-sur-Alzette | 13 | 7,104 | 6,353 | Independent | Schiltz | 2,180 |
| Esch-sur-Alzette | 13 | 7,104 | 6,353 | Independent | Mambourg | 2,173 |
| Esch-sur-Alzette | 13 | 7,104 | 6,353 | Independent | Nicolas Müller | 2,146 |
| Esch-sur-Alzette | 13 | 7,104 | 6,353 | Independent | Reimen | 2,141 |
| Grevenmacher | 3 | 2,396 | 2,101 | Party of the Right | François Altwies | 1,292 |
| Grevenmacher | 3 | 2,396 | 2,101 | Party of the Right | Joseph Bech | 1,203 |
| Grevenmacher | 3 | 2,396 | 2,101 | Party of the Right | Albert Dühr | 1,202 |
| Grevenmacher | 3 | 2,396 | 2,101 | Left Bloc | Godart | 955 |
| Luxembourg-Ville | 4 | 2,718 | 2,342 | Left Bloc | Luc Housse | 1,676 |
| Luxembourg-Ville | 4 | 2,718 | 2,342 | Left Bloc | Léandre Lacroix | 1,676 |
| Luxembourg-Ville | 4 | 2,718 | 2,342 | Left Bloc | Robert Brasseur | 1,662 |
| Luxembourg-Ville | 4 | 2,718 | 2,342 | Left Bloc | Alphonse Munchen | 1,614 |
| Luxembourg-Ville | 4 | 2,718 | 2,342 | Party of the Right | Fettes | 663 |
| Luxembourg-Ville | 4 | 2,718 | 2,342 | Party of the Right | Lessel | 635 |
| Luxembourg-Ville | 4 | 2,718 | 2,342 | Party of the Right | de La Fontaine | 616 |
| Luxembourg-Campagne | 8 | 5,374 | 4,879 | Left Bloc | Maurice Pescatore | 3,007 |
| Luxembourg-Campagne | 8 | 5,374 | 4,879 | Left Bloc | Norbert Le Gallais | 2,869 |
| Luxembourg-Campagne | 8 | 5,374 | 4,879 | Left Bloc | Joseph Palgen | 2,857 |
| Luxembourg-Campagne | 8 | 5,374 | 4,879 | Left Bloc | Léon Naval | 2,836 |
| Luxembourg-Campagne | 8 | 5,374 | 4,879 | Left Bloc | Emile Bastian | 2,830 |
| Luxembourg-Campagne | 8 | 5,374 | 4,879 | Left Bloc | Paul Koch | 2,815 |
| Luxembourg-Campagne | 8 | 5,374 | 4,879 | Left Bloc | Jacques Gallé | 2,806 |
| Luxembourg-Campagne | 8 | 5,374 | 4,879 | Left Bloc | Adolphe Schmit | 2,728 |
| Luxembourg-Campagne | 8 | 5,374 | 4,879 | Party of the Right | Émile Reuter | 2,028 |
| Luxembourg-Campagne | 8 | 5,374 | 4,879 | Party of the Right | Nicolas Philippe | 1,915 |
| Luxembourg-Campagne | 8 | 5,374 | 4,879 | Party of the Right | Nicolas Mackel | 1,910 |
| Luxembourg-Campagne | 8 | 5,374 | 4,879 | Party of the Right | Jean-Pierre Kohner | 1,883 |
| Luxembourg-Campagne | 8 | 5,374 | 4,879 | Party of the Right | Gaston Diderich | 1,816 |
| Luxembourg-Campagne | 8 | 5,374 | 4,879 | Party of the Right | Wagener | 1,795 |
| Luxembourg-Campagne | 8 | 5,374 | 4,879 | Party of the Right | Berens | 1,778 |
| Luxembourg-Campagne | 8 | 5,374 | 4,879 | Party of the Right | Warken | 1,660 |
| Luxembourg-Campagne | 8 | 5,374 | 4,879 | Independent | Gehlen | 158 |
| Luxembourg-Campagne | 8 | 5,374 | 4,879 | Independent | Christian Schmit | 27 |
| Mersch | 2 | 1,733 | 1,626 | Party of the Right | Jean-Pierre Ecker | 855 |
| Mersch | 2 | 1,733 | 1,626 | Party of the Right | Alphonse Eichhorn | 850 |
| Mersch | 2 | 1,733 | 1,626 | Left Bloc | Ludovicy | 755 |
| Mersch | 2 | 1,733 | 1,626 | Left Bloc | Erpelding | 710 |
| Redange | 3 | 2,022 | 1,848 | Party of the Right | Nicolas Klein | 1,220 |
| Redange | 3 | 2,022 | 1,848 | Party of the Right | Eugène Hoffmann | 1,209 |
| Redange | 3 | 2,022 | 1,848 | Party of the Right | Pierre Schiltz | 1,187 |
| Redange | 3 | 2,022 | 1,848 | Left Bloc | Bian | 723 |
| Remich | 2 | 1,858 | 1,655 | Party of the Right | Joseph Faber | 1,104 |
| Remich | 2 | 1,858 | 1,655 | Party of the Right | Théodore Flammang | 1,083 |
| Remich | 2 | 1,858 | 1,655 | Left Bloc | Kohn | 552 |
| Remich | 2 | 1,858 | 1,655 | Left Bloc | Greiveldinger | 86 |
| Vianden | 1 | 376 | 376 | Party of the Right | Théodore Klees | 207 |
| Vianden | 1 | 376 | 376 | Left Bloc | Sinner | 166 |
| Wiltz | 3 | 1,877 | 1,719 | Party of the Right | Nicolas Meyers | 1,066 |
| Wiltz | 3 | 1,877 | 1,719 | Party of the Right | Michel Weynandy | 1,019 |
| Wiltz | 3 | 1,877 | 1,719 | Left Bloc | Charles Mathieu | 886 |
| Wiltz | 3 | 1,877 | 1,719 | Party of the Right | Neyens | 859 |
Source: Luxemburger Wort

== Aftermath ==
Although the Party of the Right increased their representation from 20 to 25 seats, they were still short of a majority. The Hubert Loutsch government lost a vote of confidence on 11 January 1916 and resigned. Marie-Adélaïde's interference in domestic politics was strongly criticised by left-wing parties, and was partially responsible for her being forced to abdicate in favour of Charlotte in 1919.
