= 1919 Luxembourg general election =

- 26 October 1919
- 48 seats in the Chamber of Deputies; 25 seats needed for a majority
Party	Leader	Vote %	Seats	+/–
Party of the Right	Émile Reuter	49.72	27	+4
Socialist Party		17.57	8	−4
Radical Party		15.96	7	−3
IPP		6.83	2	−3
PNI	Pierre Prüm	6.24	3	+1
Cartel	Othon Decker	1.67	1	New
This lists parties that won seats. See the complete results below.
Results by constituency
Prime Minister before	Prime Minister after
Émile Reuter; Party of the Right	Émile Reuter; Party of the Right

General elections were held in Luxembourg on 26 October 1919. They were the first held after several constitutional amendments were passed on 15 May of the same year. The reforms had introduced universal suffrage and proportional representation, increased the electorate from 6% of the population to 42%, and vested national sovereignty in the people, as opposed to the Grand Duke. They were also the first elections held after the German occupation during World War I.

The election saw the beginning of conservative dominance of Luxembourgish politics, ending seventy years of liberal dominance that had begun to crumble after the death of Paul Eyschen. With the constitutional reforms and the birth of the modern political order, the elections are considered the first in the modern political history of Luxembourg.

== Results ==
The election was an overwhelming victory for the Party of the Right, led by Émile Reuter, the sitting Prime Minister. The 1919 general election was the only occasion in Luxembourgish history on which a party has held more than 50% of the seats (although it was repeated in the partial election of 1922). Reuter would maintain a coalition with the Liberal League (which ran under the name "Radical Party") for another two years, before forming the first single-party cabinet on 15 April 1921.

Party	Votes	%	Seats	+/–
Party of the Right	655,695	49.72	27	4
Socialist Party	231,672	17.57	8	–4
Radical Party	210,450	15.96	7	–3
Independent People's Party	90,076	6.83	2	–3
Independent National Party	82,297	6.24	3	+1
Cartel	22,057	1.67	1	New
Emile Mark List	14,055	1.07	0	New
Independent Workers' Party	11,354	0.86	0	New
J Kayser List	1,084	0.08	0	New
Total	1,318,740	100.00	48	–5
Registered voters/turnout	126,194	–		
Source: Nohlen & Stöver

=== By constituency ===
Constituency	Seats	Turnout	Party	Votes	Seats won
Centre	13		Party of the Right	180,545	6
Centre	13		Radical Party	121,598	4
Centre	13		Socialist Party	83,151	3
Centre	13		Independent People's Party	13,490	0
Est	7	19,054	Party of the Right	90,252	6
Est	7	19,054	Cartel	22,057	1
Est	7	19,054	Independent People's Party	7,790	0
Nord	12	29,990	Party of the Right	211,159	8
Nord	12	29,990	Independent National Party	82,297	3
Nord	12	29,990	Socialist Party	29,546	1
Nord	12	29,990	Independent People's Party	3,949	0
Sud	16		Party of the Right	173,739	7
Sud	16		Socialist Party	118,975	4
Sud	16		Radical Party	88,852	3
Sud	16		Independent People's Party	64,847	2
Sud	16		Emile Mark List	14,055	0
Sud	16		Independent Workers' Party	11,354	0
Sud	16		J Kayser List	1,084	0
Source: Luxemburger Wort, Luxemburger Wort
