= Maulkuerfgesetz =

Proposed 1937 law in Luxembourg

The Maulkuerfgesetz (Luxembourgish for "Muzzle law") (German: Maulkorbgesetz; French: Loi muselière) was a proposed 1937 law in Luxembourg. Officially, it was entitled the "Law for the Defence of the Political and Social Order" (French: Projet de loi pour la défense de l'ordre politique et social) but was nicknamed Maulkuerfgesetz by its opponents. The law would have allowed the Luxembourgish government to ban the Communist Party and dissolve any political organisation which they believed might endanger the constitutional institutions. The members of these parties or organisations would be stripped of their political offices and could not be employed by the state or by local governments.

The law was rejected in a referendum on 6 June 1937, and therefore never came into force.

== Background ==
The crisis of the 1930s gave a certain impetus to the Communist Party. Revolutionary ideas gained in popularity among workers in the Red Lands mining area, which started to worry conservatives. As a young Deputy, Joseph Bech had watched the unrest of 1917-1921, which left a profound impression on him. In addition, he was influenced by the same authoritarian and corporatist tendencies which were showing themselves in his own party, the Party of the Right, one of their advocates being the young editor of the Luxemburger Wort, Jean-Baptiste Esch. When communists started to achieve some electoral successes and managed in 1934 to get their general secretary Zénon Bernard elected to the Chamber of Deputies, Bech decided to act. The Chamber invalidated Bernard's election. The pretext was that as a revolutionary, he could not swear an oath on the Constitution. As minister for education, Bech had two teachers dismissed who were members of the Communist Party.

== Proposed law ==
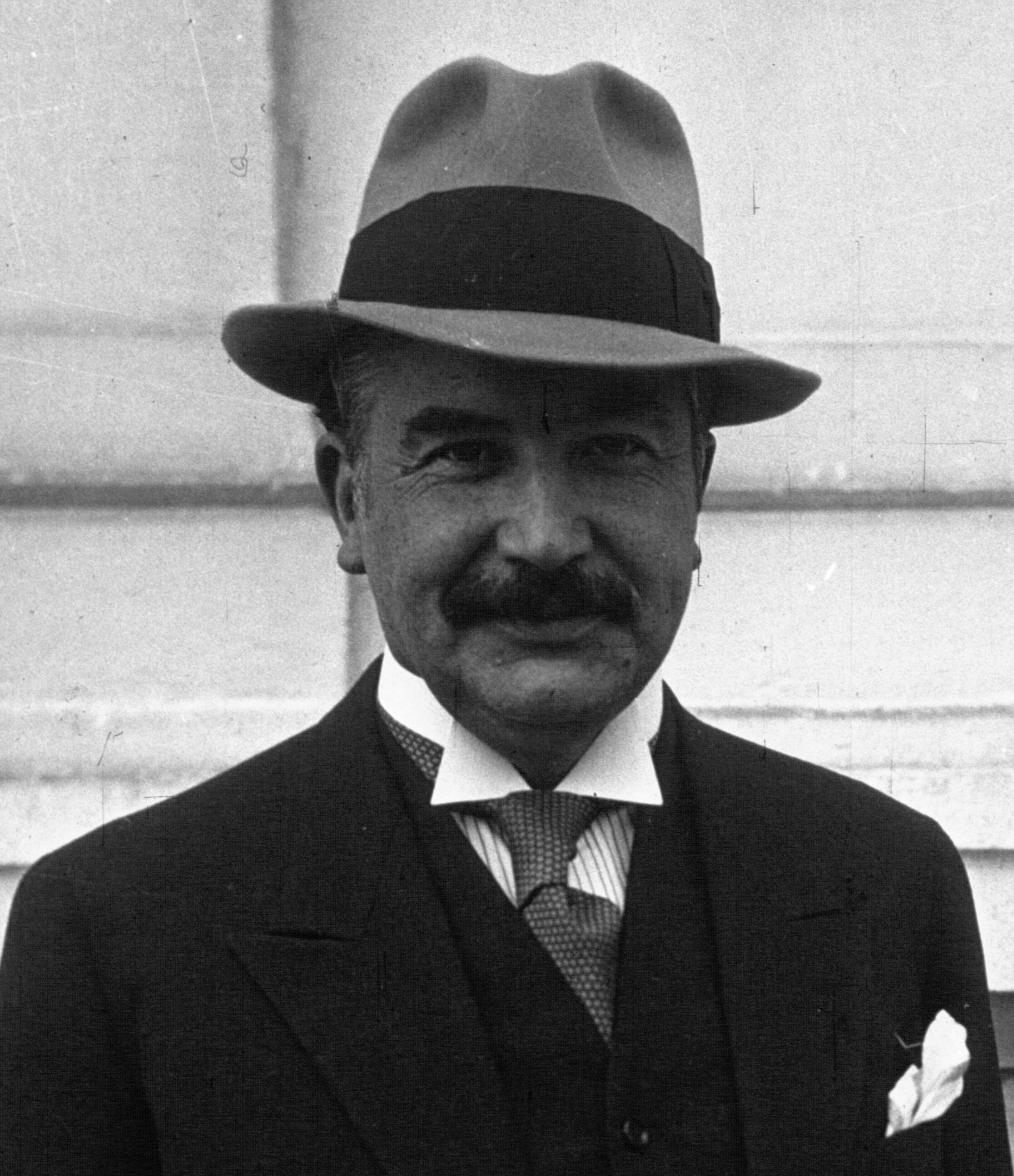
Joseph Bech, Prime Minister and proponent of the Maulkuerfgesetz, photographed in 1933

The origins of the "Law for the defence of the political and social order", also named the Loi Bech after the prime minister Joseph Bech, go back to the year 1934. The government, a coalition of the Right Party and the Radical Liberal Party, put the proposed law to the Chamber of Deputies on 2 May 1935. Little happened from then to December 1936.

The parties supporting the Bech Ministry, the Right Party and the Liberals, were in favour of the law, the opposition (consisting of the Socialists and other left-wing parties) were not. It took almost 3 years until the law's text was clarified. To understand how a party that received just 9% of the vote in the Chamber elections (many of them protest votes) was seen as such a threat that it had to be banned, one must look at the political context of the time. Especially for the Christian-conservatives, communism was the embodiment of all evil; the Liberals, as representatives of industry and the world of business, were not much more well-disposed. Additionally, the prime minister Joseph Bech had never been a friend of universal suffrage, introduced in 1919, and was nostalgic for census suffrage for the rest of his life.

== Chamber vote and referendum ==
The debate in the Chamber started on 16 April 1937, and lasted 4 days. On 23 April the law was adopted by a majority (34 votes for, 19 against, 1 abstention).

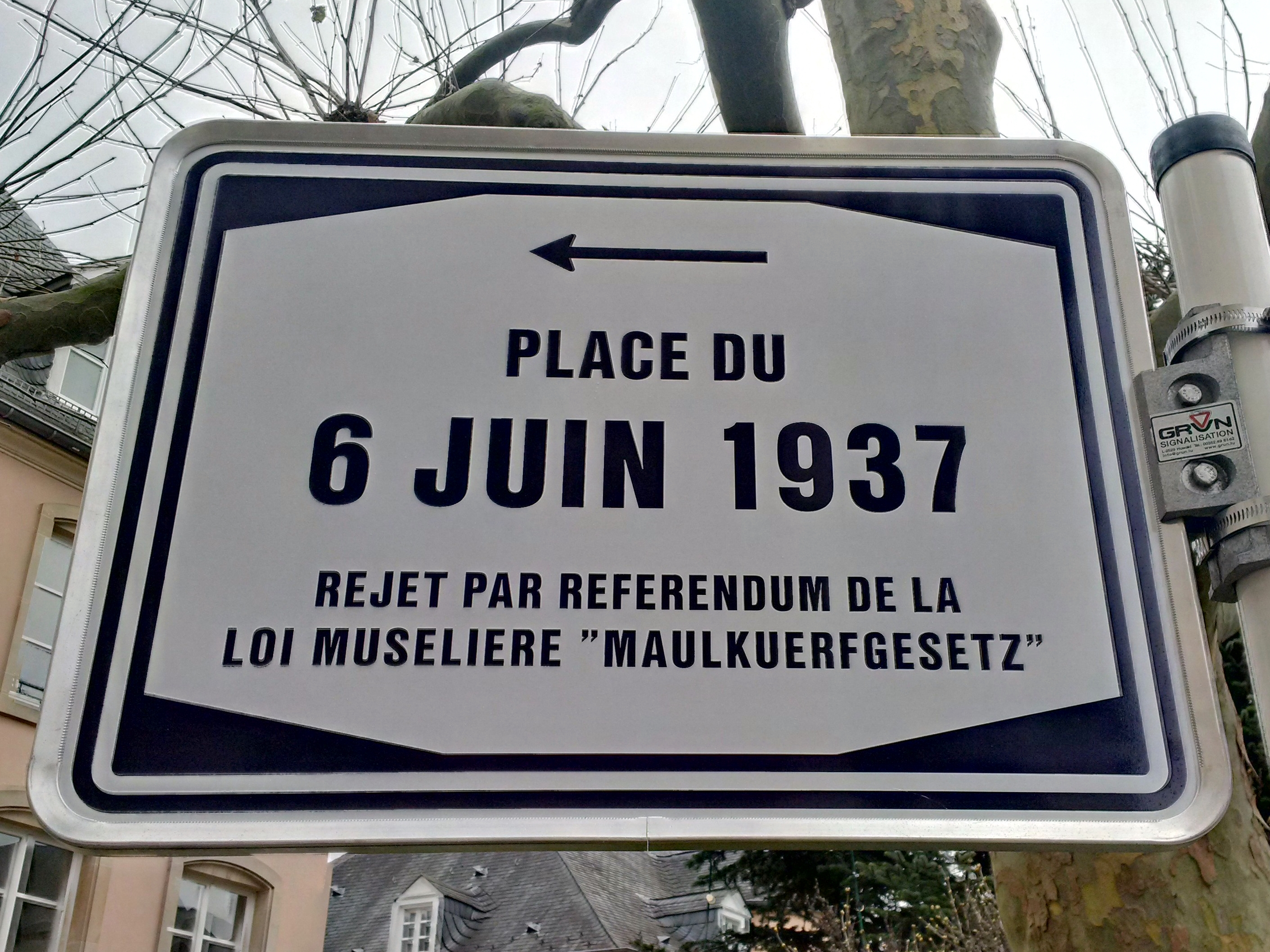
Street in Luxembourg City named after the referendum

After the vote, however, opposition in the country increased rather than fading away. There was, notably, a large amount of extra-parliamentary opposition organised by the Luxembourg Workers' Party, trade unions and young liberals. The Bech government decided to put the matter to a referendum. It was convinced that, with the support of the Luxemburger Wort and the Catholic Church, they would receive the population's assent. To many people's surprise, a slim majority (50,67 %) rejected the law on 6 June 1937.

== Aftermath ==
Partial general elections in the Nord and Centre constituencies took place on the same day as the referendum. Here, the Party of the Right kept all its seats, the Liberals lost some, and the Socialists made gains. The government coalition still possessed a majority of 31 of 55 seats; however, Bech felt rejected by the referendum result.

Joseph Bech then offered his government's resignation to the Grand Duchess. The latter did not accept it immediately, and so it took until 5 November 1937 for the new Dupong-Krier Ministry to be sworn in, with Joseph Bech as Foreign Minister, Minister for Wine-growing, and Arts and Sciences.
