= 1928 Luxembourg general election =

- 3 June 1928
- 28 out of 52 seats in the Chamber of Deputies; 27 seats needed for a majority
| Party | Leader | Vote % | Seats | +/– |
|---|---|---|---|---|
| LA | | 41.30 | 12 | +4 |
| Party of the Right | Joseph Bech | 39.84 | 24 | +2 |
| Radical Party | | 7.93 | 2 | −1 |
| Independent Group | Hubert Loutsch | 6.63 | 2 | 0 |
| Independent Left | Othon Decker | 4.30 | 2 | 0 |
| Union of the Left | | – | 4 | −1 |
| PNI | | – | 3 | 0 |
| OR | | – | 1 | 0 |
| Left Liberals | | – | 1 | 0 |
| RP (Marcel Cahen) | | – | 1 | 0 |
This lists parties that won seats. See the complete results below.
Results by constituency
| Prime Minister before | Prime Minister after |
|---|---|
| Joseph Bech; Party of the Right | Joseph Bech; Party of the Right |

Partial general elections were held in Luxembourg on 3 June 1928, electing 28 of the 52 seats in the Chamber of Deputies in the south and east of the country. The Party of the Right won 13 of the 28 seats, and saw its total number of seats rise from 22 to 24.

== Results ==
| Party | Votes | % | Seats | | | |
| Party | Votes | % | Not up | Elected | Total | +/– |
|---|---|---|---|---|---|---|
| Luxembourg Workers' Party | 352,970 | 41.30 | 2 | 10 | 12 | +4 |
| Party of the Right | 340,545 | 39.84 | 11 | 13 | 24 | +2 |
| Radical Party | 67,791 | 7.93 | 0 | 2 | 2 | –1 |
| Independent Group | 56,629 | 6.63 | 1 | 1 | 2 | 0 |
| Independent Left | 36,773 | 4.30 | 0 | 2 | 2 | 0 |
| Union of the Left | | | 4 | – | 4 | –1 |
| Independent National Party | | | 3 | – | 3 | 0 |
| Independent Party of the Right | | | 1 | – | 1 | 0 |
| Left Liberals | | | 1 | – | 1 | 0 |
| Radical Party (Marcel Cahen) | | | 1 | – | 1 | New |
| Total | 854,708 | 100.00 | 24 | 28 | 52 | +5 |
| Valid votes | 57,884 | 95.77 | | | | |
| Invalid/blank votes | 2,559 | 4.23 | | | | |
| Total votes | 60,443 | 100.00 | | | | |
Source: Nohlen & Stöver, Luxemburger Wort

=== By constituency ===
| Constituency | Seats | Electorate | Turnout | Party | Votes | Seats won |
|---|---|---|---|---|---|---|
| Est | 7 | | 19,335 | Party of the Right | 77,636 | 5 |
| Est | 7 | | 19,335 | Independent Left | 36,773 | 2 |
| Est | 7 | | 19,335 | Independent Group | 8,137 | 0 |
| Sud | 20 | 45,871 | 41,108 | Workers' Party | 352,970 | 10 |
| Sud | 20 | 45,871 | 41,108 | Party of the Right | 262,909 | 7 |
| Sud | 20 | 45,871 | 41,108 | Radical Party | 67,791 | 2 |
| Sud | 20 | 45,871 | 41,108 | Independent Group | 48,492 | 1 |
Source: Luxemburger Wort, Luxemburger Wort, Luxemburger Wort, Luxemburger Wort
