= Progressive Democratic Party of the North =

Luxembourgish political party (1931–1937)

The Progressive Democratic Party of the North (PDPN) was a political party in Luxembourg.

== History ==
The party was established by liberals in the north of Luxembourg and was linked to the Radical Socialist Party. It was led by former National Independent Party MP Nicholas Mathieu.

In the 1931 elections it received 5.3% of the vote, winning a single seat. It did not contest the partial elections of 1934, as its seat was not up for election. By the 1937 elections Mathieu was head of a new party, the Liberal Party.
