= Democratic List =

Political party in Luxembourg

The Democratic List was a political party in Luxembourg.

== History ==
The party was established by former members of the Liberal League and Party of the Right. It was linked to the Free List of Farmers, the Middle Class and Workers, with Pierre Prüm included on the list of both parties. It received 9.8% of the vote in the 1937 elections, winning two seats. It did not contest any further elections.
