= Prüm Ministry =

Government of Luxembourg, 1925–1926

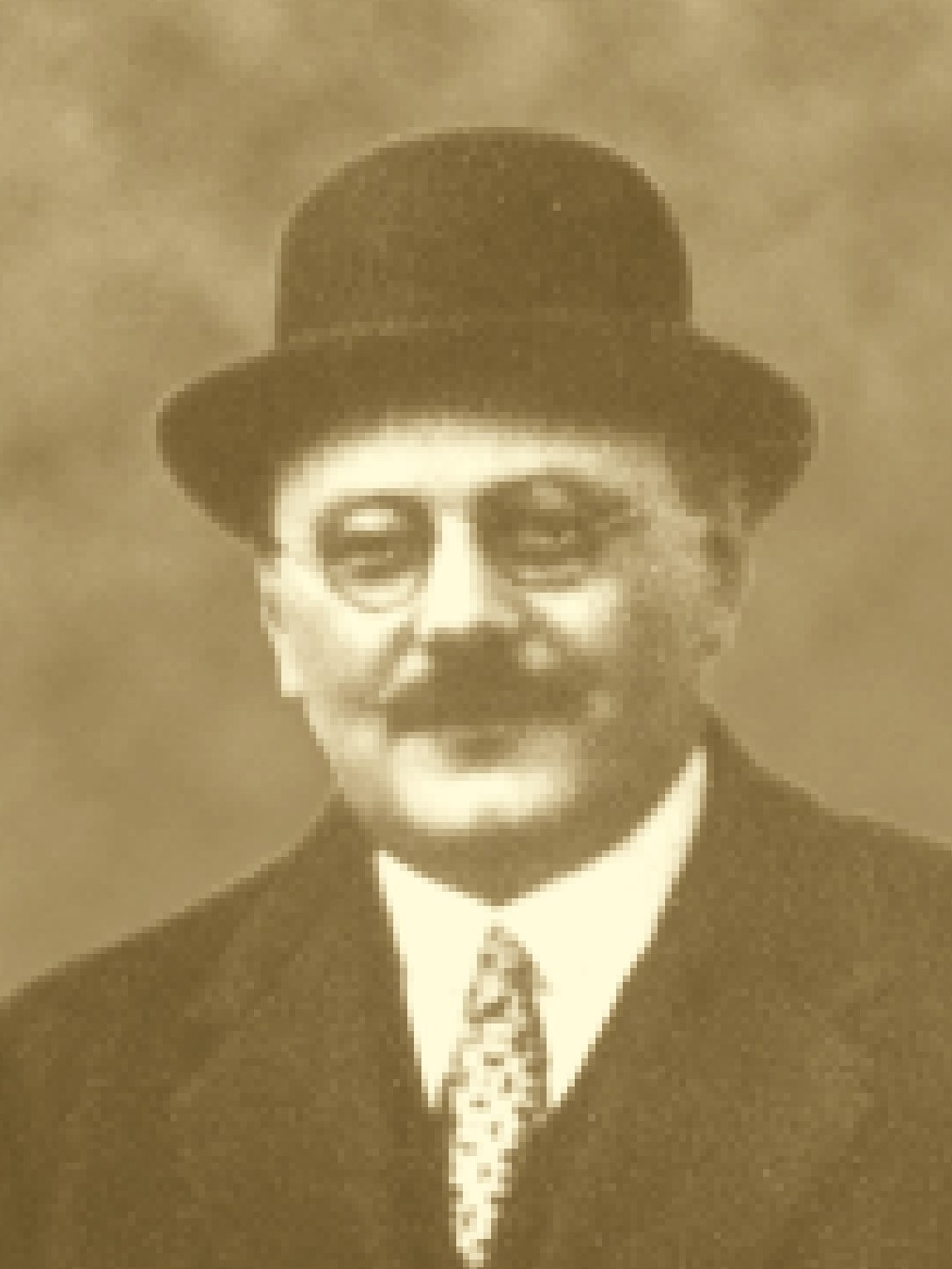
Pierre Prüm, prime minister of Luxembourg 1925-1926

The Prüm Ministry took office in Luxembourg on 20 March 1925. It was formed after the Chamber elections of 1 March 1925 and was supported by the Independent National Party, the Liberals, the Socialists and elements of the Party of the Right. It resigned on 16 July 1926, as the Liberals and Socialists could not agree over a bill for workers' holiday.

== Formation ==
The Chamber of Deputies' rejection of the railway treaty with Belgium brought about the Reuter government's resignation. As it was not possible for a new government majority to be formed, the Chamber was dissolved and new general elections were called for 1 March 1925. The election saw various changes in the political landscape, as nine different political parties were henceforth represented in the Chamber. The right lost its absolute majority, and held on to 22 out of 47. But it refused to enter into coalition with any party that had voted against the railway treaty. Pierre Prüm, leader of the Independent National Party, was asked to form a new government, and relied on an eclectic alliance of liberals, socialists, and some Deputies on the right.

== Foreign policy ==
At the risk of provoking a break-up of the Belgium–Luxembourg Economic Union, Pierre Prüm sought a rapprochement with France. When he had only just taken office, the prime minister was received in Paris. On 9 October 1925, an agreement was reached with the Administration des chemins de fer d'Alsace et de Lorraine. This agreement gave France the provisional right to the Guillaume-Luxembourg network. During the Prüm government's time in office, the Locarno Treaties were also signed. Although they came about without Luxembourgish participation, they marked an important date in the evolution of the Grand Duchy's defence policy. The fact that France and Germany guaranteed the inviolability of national borders, and agreed not to use war, consolidated Luxembourg's international situation. Pierre Prüm made use of the Locarno Treaties' possibilities for international arbitration, to start talks with the Belgian and French governments. These would only conclude under the next government.

== Social policy ==
Although the Socialist Party was not directly represented in the government, it constituted the Prüm government's main support, alongside the Independent National Party. Under the impetus of the socialists, the government took a number of social measures. One of its first acts was to re-establish the workers' delegations, in factories with over 20 workers. However, the bill on workers' holidays, which was debated in the Chamber from May 1926, divided the liberals and socialists. As it no longer had a parliamentary majority, the Prüm government resigned on 15 July 1926.

== Composition ==
- Pierre Prüm (Independent National Party): Minister of State, head of government, Director-General of Foreign Affairs, the Interior, and Agriculture
- Norbert Dumont: Director-General for Justice, Public Works, Trade and Industry
- Othon Decker (Independent Left): Director-General for Social Security and Labor
- Étienne Schmit: Director-General for Finance and Education
