= Ministry of Foreign Affairs (Luxembourg) =

Ministry for Foreign Affairs
- Ministère des Affaires Étrangères et Europeennes
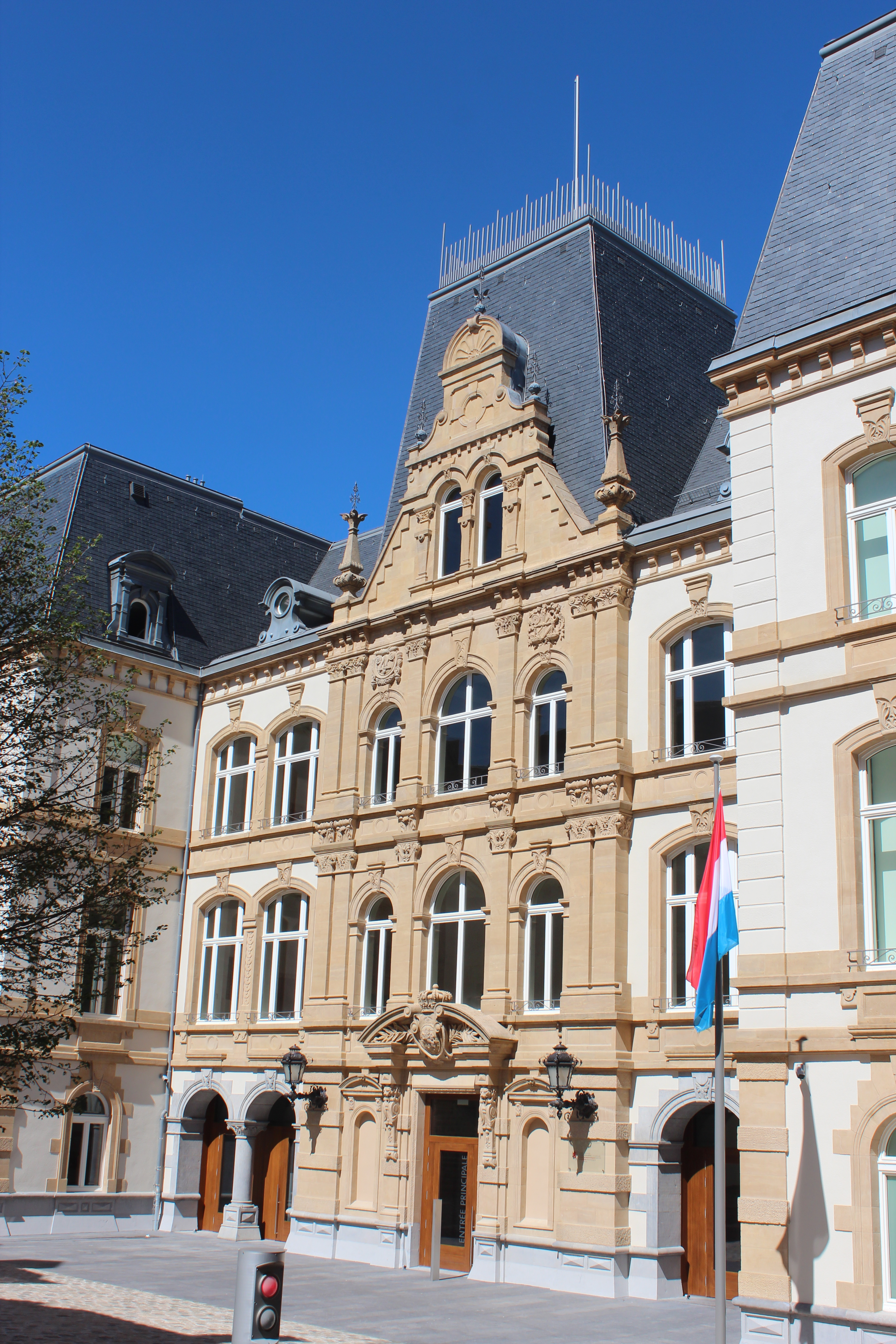
- The Mansfeld Building, since 2017 headquarters of the Ministry of Foreign and European Affairs

Ministry overview
- Formed: 1848; 178 years ago (as part of the Prime Minister’s Office)
- Jurisdiction: Government of Luxembourg
- Headquarters: The Mansfeld Building, 9 Rue du Palais de Justice, 1841 Ville-Haute Luxembourg; 49°36′44″N 6°07′59″E
- Cabinet Minister responsible: The Rt Hon. Xavier Bettel, Deputy Prime Minister Minister for Foreign and European Affairs, Cooperation, Foreign Trade and the Greater Region
- Minister attending Cabinet responsible: The Rt Hon. Yuriko Backes, Minister of Defence
- Child agencies: General Secretariat; Directorate of Political Affairs; Directorate of European Affairs and International Economic Relations; Directorate of Protocol and Chancellery; Directorate of Finance and Human Resources; The Directorate for Development Cooperation and Humanitarian Affairs; Directorate of Consular Affairs and International Cultural Relations; Directorate of Defence
- Website: English-language website

The Ministry of Foreign and European Affairs, Defence, Development Cooperation and Foreign Trade (Luxembourgish: Ministère des Affaires étrangères et européennes, de la Défense, de la Coopération et du Commerce extérieur, MAE), commonly referred to as the Ministry of Foreign Affairs, is a ministry of the government of Luxembourg, which comprises a general secretariat and eight directorates. The ministry is headquartered in the Bâtiment Mansfeld in Luxembourg City.

The office of Minister of Foreign Affairs is customarily given to a member of the junior party in a coalition, and usually coincides with that of Deputy Prime Minister. For instance, LSAP politicians Jacques Poos and Jean Asselborn served a combined 34 years as Minister of Foreign Affairs in CSV and DP-led governments, 24 of which as Deputy Prime Minister.

== Beginning ==
The position of Minister for Foreign Affairs has been in continuous existence since the promulgation of Luxembourg's first constitution, in 1848. Until 1937, the position was held concurrently by the Prime Minister, thus ridding it of any true significance as an office. However, in 1937, Joseph Bech resigned as Prime Minister, but was immediately reappointed as Minister for Foreign Affairs upon Pierre Dupong's premiership. When Bech became Prime Minister again, in 1953, the two jobs were united once more. Over the next twenty-six years, the jobs were separated and united another two times. However, since 1979, the two positions have been kept in separate hands.

Several times since World War II, the minister for foreign affairs has also been the deputy prime minister and leader of the smaller party in a coalition government; this has especially been the case since the 1980s.

Since 24 March 1936, the title of Minister for Foreign Affairs has been an official one, although the position had been unofficially known by that name since its creation. From the position's creation until 28 November 1857, the minister went by the title of Administrator-General. From 1857 until 1936, the minister went by the title of Director-General.

== Organisation ==
As of 2017, the Ministry consists of a general secretariat and 8 Directorates:

- Directorate of Political Affairs
- Directorate of European Affairs and International Economic Relations
- Directorate of Protocol and the Chancellery
- Directorate of Finance and Human Resources
- Directorate of Development Cooperation and Humanitarian Action
- Directorate of Consular Affairs and International Cultural Relations
- Directorate of Defence
- Directorate of Immigration

== List of ministers ==
| Minister | Party | Start date | End date | Other posts | Prime Minister |
|---|---|---|---|---|---|
| Gaspard-Théodore-Ignace de la Fontaine | None | 1 August 1848 | 2 December 1848 | | Himself |
| Jean-Jacques Willmar | None | 2 December 1848 | 23 September 1853 | | Himself |
| Charles-Mathias Simons | None | 23 September 1853 | 26 September 1860 | | Himself |
| Baron de Tornaco | None | 26 September 1860 | 3 December 1867 | | Himself |
| Emmanuel Servais | None | 3 December 1867 | 26 December 1874 | | Himself |
| Baron de Blochausen | None | 26 December 1874 | 20 February 1885 | | Himself |
| Édouard Thilges | None | 20 February 1885 | 22 September 1888 | | Himself |
| Paul Eyschen | None | 22 September 1888 | 11 October 1915 | | Himself |
| Mathias Mongenast | None | 12 October 1915 | 6 November 1915 | | Himself |
| Hubert Loutsch | None | 6 November 1915 | 24 February 1916 | | Himself |
| Victor Thorn | None | 24 February 1916 | 19 June 1917 | | Himself |
| Léon Kauffman | PD | 19 June 1917 | 28 September 1918 | | Himself |
| Émile Reuter | PD | 28 September 1918 | 20 March 1925 | | Himself |
| Pierre Prüm | PNI | 20 March 1925 | 16 July 1926 | | Himself |
| Joseph Bech | PD | 16 July 1926 | 5 November 1937 | | Himself |
| Joseph Bech | PD | 5 November 1937 | 23 November 1944 | | Pierre Dupong |
| Joseph Bech | CSV | 23 November 1944 | 29 December 1953 | | Pierre Dupong |
| Joseph Bech | CSV | 29 December 1953 | 29 March 1958 | | Himself |
| Joseph Bech | CSV | 29 March 1958 | 2 March 1959 | | Pierre Frieden |
| Eugène Schaus | DP | 2 March 1959 | 15 July 1964 | Deputy Prime Minister | Pierre Werner |
| Pierre Werner | CSV | 15 July 1964 | 3 January 1967 | | Pierre Werner |
| Pierre Grégoire | CSV | 3 January 1967 | 6 February 1969 | | Pierre Werner |
| Gaston Thorn | DP | 6 February 1969 | 15 June 1974 | | Pierre Werner |
| Gaston Thorn | DP | 15 June 1974 | 16 July 1979 | | Himself |
| Gaston Thorn | DP | 16 July 1979 | 22 November 1980 | Deputy Prime Minister | Pierre Werner |
| Colette Flesch | DP | 22 November 1980 | 20 July 1984 | Deputy Prime Minister | Pierre Werner |
| Jacques Poos | LSAP | 20 July 1984 | 26 January 1995 | Deputy Prime Minister | Jacques Santer |
| Jacques Poos | LSAP | 26 January 1995 | 7 August 1999 | Deputy Prime Minister | Jean-Claude Juncker |
| Lydie Polfer | DP | 7 August 1999 | 20 July 2004 | Deputy Prime Minister | Jean-Claude Juncker |
| Charles Goerens | DP | 20 July 2004 | 31 July 2004 | | Jean-Claude Juncker |
| Jean Asselborn | LSAP | 31 July 2004 | 4 December 2013 | Deputy Prime Minister | Jean-Claude Juncker |
| Jean Asselborn | LSAP | 4 December 2013 | 17 November 2023 | | Xavier Bettel |
| Xavier Bettel | DP | 17 November 2023 | Incumbent | Deputy Prime Minister | Luc Frieden |

== See also ==
- Foreign relations of Luxembourg
- List of diplomatic missions of Luxembourg
- List of diplomatic missions in Luxembourg
- List of prime ministers of Luxembourg
- Luxembourg and the United Nations
