= Independent Party of the Right =

The Independent Party of the Right (Luxembourgish: Onofhängeg Rietspartei) was a political party in Luxembourg led by Eugène Hoffmann, a dissident from the Party of the Right.

== History ==
In the 1925 elections the party received 2.4% of the vote, winning a single seat. It did not contest the partial elections of 1928, and by the 1931 elections Hoffmann had established the Party of Farmers and the Middle Class.
