= 1925 Luxembourg general election =

- 1 March 1925
- 47 seats in the Chamber of Deputies; 24 seats needed for a majority
Party	Leader	Vote %	Seats	+/–
Party of the Right	Émile Reuter	40.27	22	−4
LA		19.00	8	+2
Union of the Left	Gaston Diderich	10.03	5	New
PNI	Pierre Prüm	6.07	3	−1
Radical Left		6.15	3	New
UNI	Hubert Loutsch	7.55	2	New
Independent Left	Othon Decker	2.98	2	+1
Left Liberals		2.96	1	New
OR	Eugène Hoffmann	2.09	1	New
This lists parties that won seats. See the complete results below.
Results by constituency
Prime Minister before	Prime Minister after
Émile Reuter; Party of the Right	Pierre Prüm; PNI

General elections were held in Luxembourg on 1 March 1925. The Party of the Right won 22 of the 47 seats in the Chamber of Deputies.

== Results ==
Party	Votes	%	Seats	+/–
Party of the Right	536,691	40.27	22	–4
Luxembourg Workers' Party	253,256	19.00	8	+2
Union of the Left	133,747	10.03	5	New
National Independent Union	100,568	7.55	2	New
Radical Left	82,017	6.15	3	New
Independent National Party	80,895	6.07	3	–1
Independent Left	39,700	2.98	2	+1
Left Liberals	39,500	2.96	1	New
Independent Party of the Right	27,806	2.09	1	New
Independent Party of the Peasants	23,263	1.75	0	New
Party of the Workers and Peasants	15,443	1.16	0	New
Total	1,332,886	100.00	47	–1
Valid votes	109,216	95.43		
Invalid/blank votes	5,233	4.57		
Total votes	114,449	100.00		
Source: Nohlen & Stöver, Luxemburger Wort

=== By constituency ===
Constituency	Seats	Electorate	Turnout	Party	Votes	Seats won
Centre	13		35,747	Party of the Right	153,969	5
Centre	13		35,747	Union of the Left	133,747	5
Centre	13		35,747	Workers' Party	53,437	1
Centre	13		35,747	National Independent Union	45,560	1
Centre	13		35,747	Left Liberals	39,500	1
Est	7		18,270	Party of the Right	69,322	5
Est	7		18,270	Independent Left	39,700	2
Est	7		18,270	National Independent Union	10,625	0
Nord	11		28,008	Party of the Right	154,347	6
Nord	11		28,008	Independent National Party	80,895	3
Nord	11		28,008	Independent Party of the Right	27,806	1
Nord	11		28,008	Workers' Party	27,498	1
Sud	16	33,997	32,424	Workers' Party	172,321	6
Sud	16	33,997	32,424	Party of the Right	159,053	6
Sud	16	33,997	32,424	Radical Left	82,017	3
Sud	16	33,997	32,424	National Independent Union	44,383	1
Sud	16	33,997	32,424	Independent Party of the Peasants	23,263	0
Sud	16	33,997	32,424	Party of the Workers and Peasants	15,443	0
Source: Luxemburger Wort
