= 1931 Luxembourg general election =

- 7 June 1931
- 27 out of 54 seats in the Chamber of Deputies; 28 seats needed for a majority
Party	Leader	Vote %	Seats	+/–
Party of the Right	Joseph Bech	44.94	26	+2
Socialist Workers' Party		19.83	15	+3
Radical Socialist Party		10.11	4	−2
RP (Marcel Cahen)	Marcel Cahen	8.49	2	+1
PACM	Eugène Hoffmann	5.99	2	New
Independent Party	Hubert Loutsch	5.23	2	0
PDPN	Nicholas Mathieu	4.60	1	New
Independent Left		–	2	0
This lists parties that won seats. See the complete results below.
Results by constituency
Prime Minister before	Prime Minister after
Joseph Bech; Party of the Right	Joseph Bech; Party of the Right

Partial general elections were held in Luxembourg on 7 June 1931, electing 25 of the 54 seats in the Chamber of Deputies in the centre and north of the country, as well as two seats in the south. The Party of the Right won 14 of the 27 seats, and saw its total number of seats rise from 24 to 26.

== Results ==
Party	Votes	%	Seats			
Party	Votes	%	Not up	Elected	Total	+/–
Party of the Right	348,652	44.94	12	14	26	+2
Luxembourg Workers' Party	153,805	19.83	10	5	15	+3
Radical Socialist Party	78,464	10.11	2	2	4	–2
Radical Party (Marcel Cahen)	65,861	8.49	0	2	2	+1
Party of Farmers and the Middle Class	46,446	5.99	0	2	2	New
Independent Party	40,569	5.23	1	1	2	0
Progressive Democratic Party of the North	35,702	4.60	0	1	1	New
Communist Party of Luxembourg	6,264	0.81	0	0	0	New
Independent Left			2	–	2	0
Total	775,763	100.00	27	27	54	+2
Valid votes	65,620	94.42				
Invalid/blank votes	3,878	5.58				
Total votes	69,498	100.00				
Source: Nohlen & Stöver

=== By constituency ===
Constituency	Seats	Turnout	Party	Votes	Seats won
Centre	14	39,154	Party of the Right	185,144	6
Centre	14	39,154	Workers' Party	115,882	3
Centre	14	39,154	Radical Socialist Party	78,464	2
Centre	14	39,154	Radical Party	58,160	2
Centre	14	39,154	Independent Party	40,569	1
Centre	14	39,154	Communist Party	6,264	0
Nord	11	30,344	Party of the Right	163,508	7
Nord	11	30,344	Party of Farmers and the Middle Class	46,446	2
Nord	11	30,344	Workers' Party	37,923	1
Nord	11	30,344	Progressive Democratic Party of the North	35,702	1
Nord	11	30,344	Radical Party	7,701	0
Sud	2	44,846	Workers' Party	35,944	1
Sud	2	44,846	Party of the Right	30,637	1
Sud	2	44,846	Radical Socialist Party	10,883	0
Sud	2	44,846	Communist Party	4,543	0
Source: Luxemburger Wort, Luxemburger Wort
