= Free List =

Free List may refer to:

== Computer science ==
- Free list, a data structure used in dynamic memory allocation

== Politics ==
- Free list, a form of open list party-list proportional representation system
- Free List (Liechtenstein), a centre-left political party in Liechtenstein
- Free List (Fria Listan), a defunct libertarian political party that contested the 2002 Swedish general election
- Free List of Farmers, the Middle Class and Workers, a defunct political party in Luxembourg

== Economics ==
Free lists show goods not subject to customs duty
