= Left Bloc (Luxembourg) =

The Left Bloc (Luxembourgish: Lénksblock, French: Bloc des Gauches) was a political alliance in the Chamber of Deputies of Luxembourg at the beginning of the 20th century. The "marriage of convenience" between the Social Democratic Party and the Liberal League was formed in 1908.

Its goal was to roll back the influence of the Church in public life, and specifically in schools. In this, it was successful against the "Right Bloc" (the later Party of the Right), when the Deputies of the two parties voted through the Education Law of 1912.

In this period, before universal suffrage had been introduced (in 1919), only 20,000 of the wealthier taxpayers had the right to vote. Thus, the centre of power was in the legislature, and this was a parliament of notables.

After their common goal had been reached, the two parties went their separate ways. In part, this was because the liberal, business-friendly world-view on the one hand, and socialist ideas on the other, were irreconcilable.

== Captains of industry ==
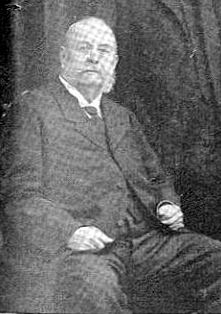
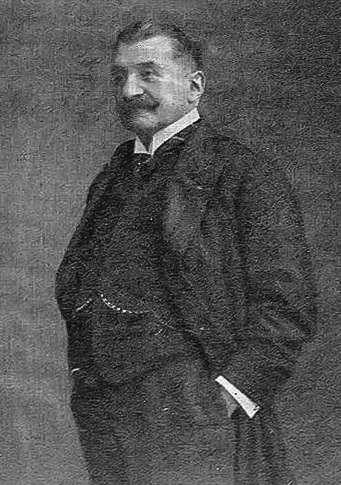
Léon Metz and Auguste Laval, two of the steel industrialists and Deputies who were part of the Left Bloc

The management of the steel industry played a significant role both in the parliament and in the Left Bloc.

The major steel company ARBED was formed in 1911 from the merger of the three largest Luxembourgish steel producers. Of the 12 members of its board of directors at its inception, 4 sat in the Chamber of Deputies. These were: Auguste Laval, lawyer (Eich); Norbert Le Gallais, foundry owner (Luxembourg City), Adolph Schmit, lawyer (Luxembourg City), and Léon Metz, foundry owner (Esch-Alzette). If one includes further Deputies, such as Edmond Muller and Maurice Pescatore, the son and son-in-law respectively of ARBED board members, the company's staff and supporters already had the size of a parliamentary party as soon as it was founded. This was a time in which the total number of seats was around 50, and formal political parties themselves were in their infancy. (The Social Democratic Party was only founded in 1902, the Liberal League in 1904.)
