= Party of Farmers and the Middle Class =

Former political party in Luxembourg

The Party of Farmers and the Middle Class (French: Parti des Agriculteurs et des Classes Moyennes, PACM) was a political party in Luxembourg led by Eugène Hoffmann.

== History ==
Hoffmann had previously headed the Independent Party of the Right, which won a single seat in the 1925 elections. The PACM received 6.9% of the vote in the 1931 elections, winning two seats. It did not contest the partial elections of 1934 but its seats were not up for election. However, it lost both seats in the 1937 elections as its vote share fell to 2.6%.
