= National Independent Union =

Former political party in Luxembourg

The National Independent Union (French: Union Nationale Indépendant) was a political party in Luxembourg.

== History ==
The National Independent Union was formed as a breakaway from the Party of the Right, and was led by Hubert Loutsch and Jean-Pierre Kohner. In the 1925 elections it received 7.3% of the vote, winning two seats.

The party contested the 1928 elections as the "Independent Group", retaining the one seat it had up for election. It then ran as the "Independent Party" in the 1931 elections, again retaining its one-seat up for election. In the 1934 elections it ran under the name "Independents", losing its seat in the south of the country.

After 1934, the party did not contest any further elections.
