= 1937 Luxembourg political parties referendum =

- 6 June 1937
- Do you agree that the law ordering the dissolution of the Communist Party and the associations that want to change the Constitution or the laws of the country through violence or threats come into force?

Results
Choice	Votes	%
Yes	70,371	49.32%
No	72,300	50.68%
Valid votes	142,671	92.95%
Invalid or blank votes	10,815	7.05%
Total votes	153,486	100.00%
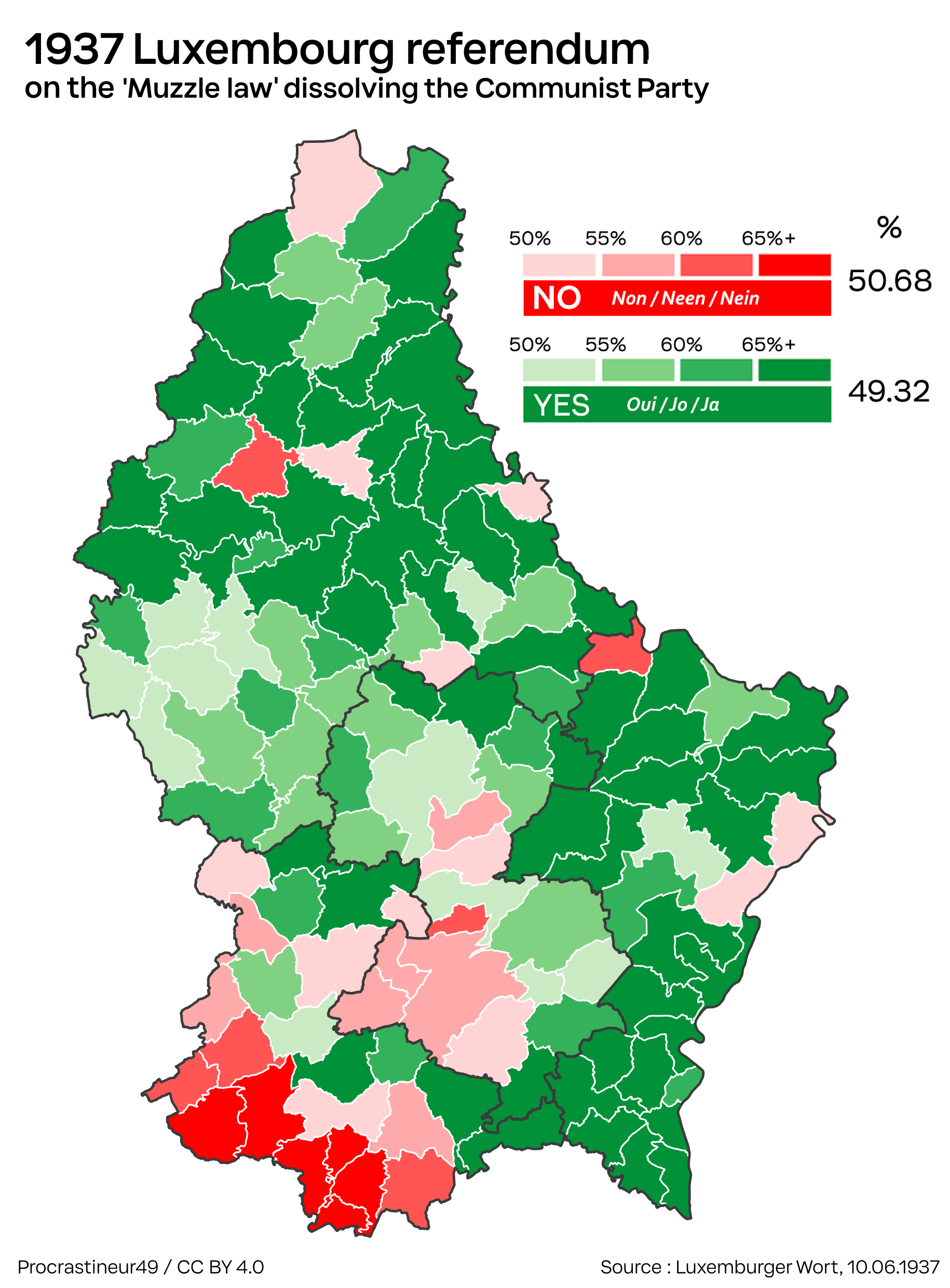
- Results by commune

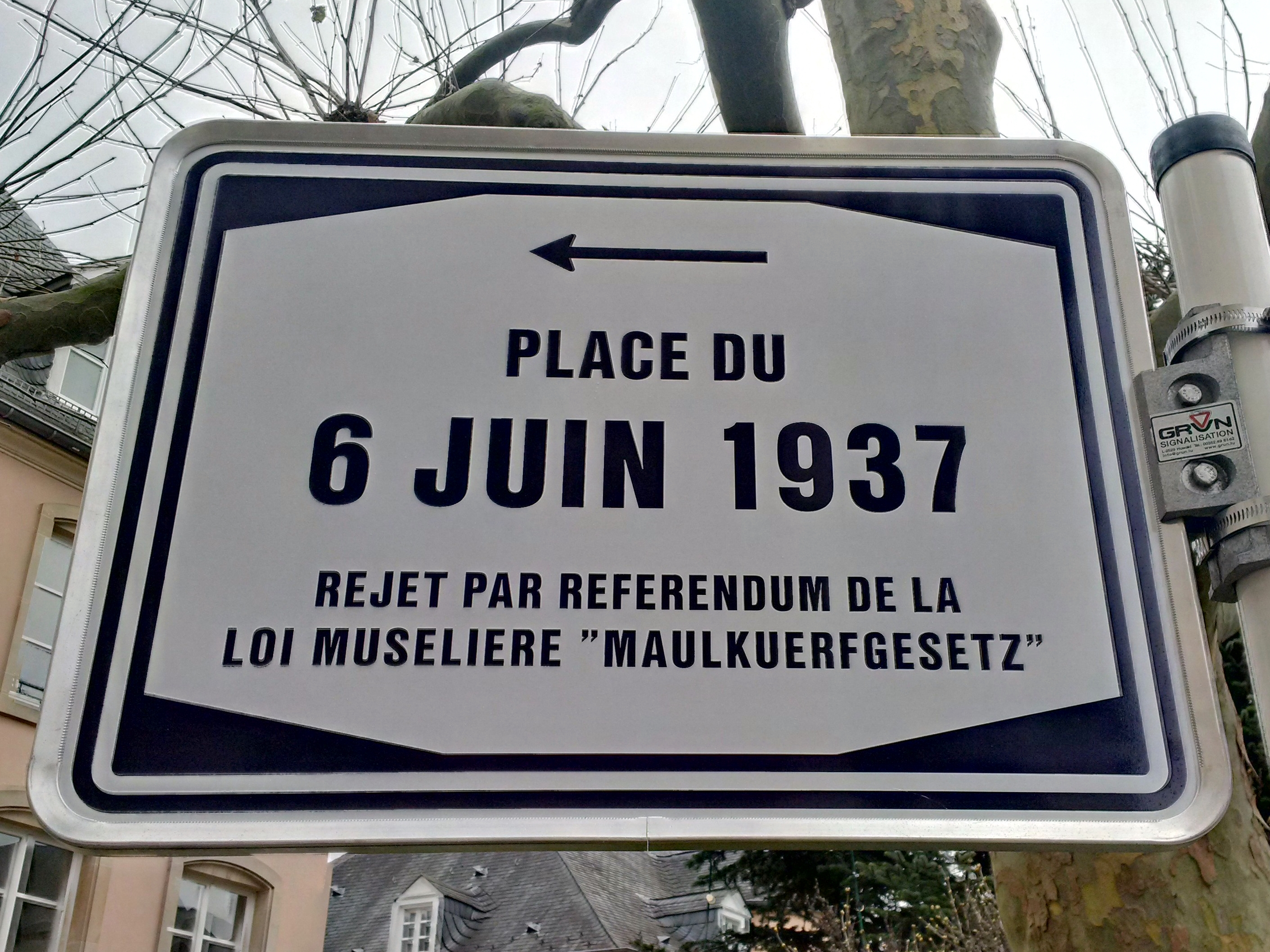
A small square in Luxembourg City is named in honor of the referendum's rejection.

A referendum on the order law was held in Luxembourg on 6 June 1937. Voters were asked whether they approved of the new law (loi d'ordre), which would have banned any political party that sought to change the constitution or national legislation by violence or threats. The law would have resulted in the dissolution of the Communist Party, and became known as the Maulkuerfgesetz ("muzzle law" or loi muselière).

The proposal was narrowly rejected by voters, leading to the resignation of Prime Minister Joseph Bech and his replacement by Pierre Dupong.

== Background ==
The law was proposed by the Party of the Right, which had become increasingly authoritarian during the 1930s. Protests against the law were led by the Labour Party, trade unions and young members of the Radical Liberal Party. Believing he had the support of the majority of the public, Bech agreed to a referendum on the law shortly before it was adopted by the Chamber of Deputies by a vote of 34 to 19.

== Results ==
Choice	Votes	%
For	70,371	49.32
Against	72,300	50.68
Total	142,671	100.00
Valid votes	142,671	92.95
Invalid/blank votes	10,815	7.05
Total votes	153,486	100.00
Source: Nohlen & Stöver
