= 1934 Luxembourg general election =

- 3 June 1934
- 29 out of 54 seats in the Chamber of Deputies; 28 seats needed for a majority
Party	Leader	Vote %	Seats	+/–
Party of the Right	Joseph Bech	37.00	25	−1
LA		36.71	14	−1
Radical Liberal Party		12.85	7	New
KPL		6.44	1	+1
PIE	Othon Decker	4.60	3	+1
Independents	Hubert Loutsch	2.33	1	−1
PACM		–	2	0
PDPN		–	1	0
This lists parties that won seats. See the complete results below.
Prime Minister before	Prime Minister after
Joseph Bech; Party of the Right	Joseph Bech; Party of the Right

Partial general elections were held in Luxembourg on 3 June 1934, electing 29 of the 54 seats in the Chamber of Deputies in the south and east of the country. The Party of the Right won 12 of the 29 seats, but saw its total number of seats fall from 26 to 25.

The Communist Party of Luxembourg won its first seat, but it was later invalidated by a vote in the Chamber of Deputies. Its seat was given instead to the Luxembourg Workers' Party, who had voted against its expulsion.

== Results ==
Party	Votes	%	Seats			
Party	Votes	%	Not up	Elected	Total	+/–
Party of the Right	407,838	37.00	13	12	25	–1
Luxembourg Workers' Party	404,729	36.71	4	10	14	–1
Radical Liberal Party	141,695	12.85	4	3	7	1
Communist Party of Luxembourg	70,940	6.44	0	1	1	+1
Party of Independents of the East	50,707	4.60	0	3	3	+1
Independents	25,694	2.33	1	0	1	–1
Middle Class Party	793	0.07	0	0	0	New
Party of Farmers and the Middle Class			2	–	2	0
Progressive Democratic Party of the North			1	–	1	0
Total	1,102,396	100.00	25	29	54	0
Valid votes	66,416	95.39				
Invalid/blank votes	3,207	4.61				
Total votes	69,623	100.00				
Source: Nohlen & Stöver, Luxemburger Wort

=== By constituency ===
Constituency	Seats	Turnout	Party	Votes	Seats won
Est	7	49,491	Party of the Right	77,560	4
Est	7	49,491	Party of Independents of the East	58,160	2
Sud	22		Workers' Party	404,729	10
Sud	22		Party of the Right	330,278	8
Sud	22		Radical Liberal Party	141,695	3
Sud	22		Communist Party	70,940	1
Sud	22		Independents	25,694	0
Sud	22		Middle Class Party	793	0
Source: Luxemburger Wort, Luxemburger Wort
