= Zénon Bernard =

Luxembourgish communist politician

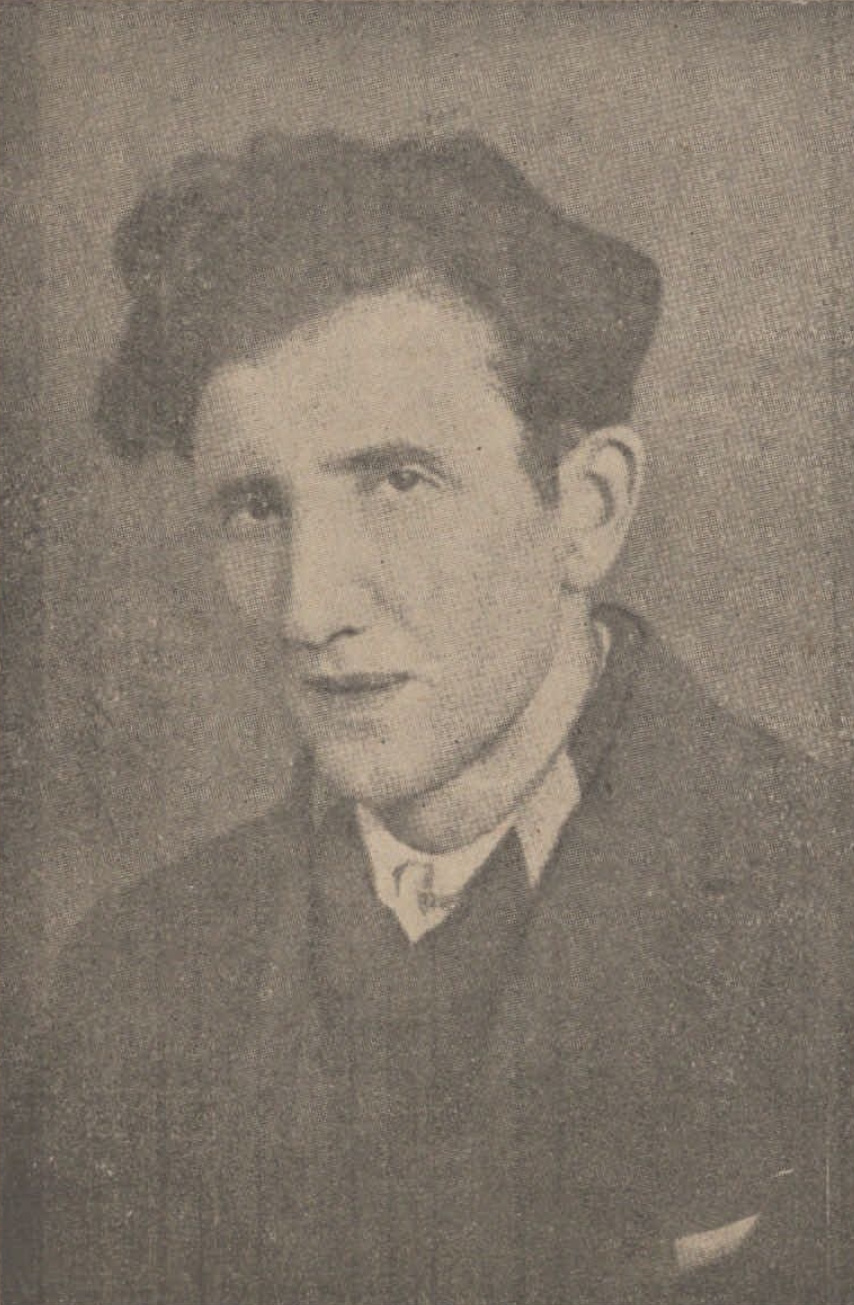
- Undated portrait of Bernard

Chairman of the Communist Party of Luxembourg
- In office May 1921 – 25 June 1942

Personal details
- Born: 15 February 1893 Kahler, Grand Duchy of Luxembourg
- Died: 25 June 1942 (aged 49) Kassel, Nazi Germany
- Party: KPL
- Occupation: Politician, footballer

Johann Zénon Bernard (13 February 1893 – 25 June 1942) was a Luxembourgish communist politician. He led the Communist Party of Luxembourg during its first two decades of existence, and was the first communist elected to the Chamber of Deputies. He died in German captivity during the Second World War.

== Political activism ==
Bernard was born in Kahler. He was a metal worker by profession. He joined the socialist movement when the First World War broke out. He became a leading figure in the leftwing faction of the Socialist Party, advocating affiliation to the Communist International. In January 1921, he took part in the founding of the Communist Party of Luxembourg and became the secretary of the Central Committee of the party. In May 1921, he became the party chairman.

Bernard was elected to parliament in the 1934 general election. He was the first Luxembourgish communist elected to parliament. He was, however, barred from occupying his seat by the centre-right majority, on the pretext that as a revolutionary Bernard could not swear on the Constitution.

== Resistance and imprisonment ==
After the German invasion of Luxembourg in the Second World War, Bernard headed the underground activities of the Communist Party. He was arrested by Gestapo in September 1940. Bernard died in German captivity in Kassel.

== Sports ==
Bernard was a football player in his youth. He played for Sporting Club Luxembourg between 1911 and 1914. He played in the Luxembourg national football team twice, against France on 29 October 1911, and again against France on 8 February 1914. In the latter game, a friendly, he scored a goal, and Luxembourg won the match by 5–4, the only time Luxembourg ever beat France.

== Streets ==
Bernard was a resident of Esch-sur-Alzette. A street is named after him in the city, where the Communist Party and its newspaper Zeitung vum Lëtzebuerger Vollek has its offices. There is also a street named after him in Differdange.
