= Independent National Party (Luxembourg) =

Defunct political party in Luxembourg

The Independent National Party (Luxembourgish: Onofhängeg Nationalpartei, French: Parti national indépendant, German: Unabhängige Nationalpartei), abbreviated as PNI, was a populist political party in Luxembourg in the interwar period.

The party was founded in 1918 by disgruntled members of the Party of the Right. The most prominent of the founders was Pierre Prüm, who was appointed the party's leader. The constitutional amendments of 1919 introduced universal suffrage and proportional representation, strengthening the new populists' chance of winning both votes and seats. In the first election after the reforms, the party won three seats (out of 48) in the Chamber of Deputies, finishing a distant fourth; the dominant Party of the Right won 27 seats, allowing it to form the only stand-alone government in Luxembourgish history.

In the election of 1922, the PNI increased its share to four seats, but fell back to three in the 1925 election. More importantly, the Party of the Right fell below the 50% threshold, allowing the other parties to form a broad-based coalition against the conservatives. The coalition relied upon almost all minor parties giving their support to pass measures of confidence, but included members of only three party lists: the Independent National Party, the Radical Socialist Party, and the Independent Left. The head of the coalition was the leader of the PNI, Prüm, even though the party was only the joint-fourth largest party in the Chamber of Deputies.

In 1926, the government attempted to reward the support offered by the Socialist Party by improving minimum working conditions. However, this was opposed by the Radical Socialists, a party that was born from the Liberal League and maintained its predecessor's support for business and the middle classes. In opposition, the Radical Socialists withdrew their support from the coalition, leaving the government short of a majority. To avoid a humiliating motion of no confidence, Prüm offered his resignation on 22 June, and left politics to become a judge. At the next election, without Prüm, the PNI's share of the vote was slashed, and the party won only one seat. In the 1931 election, the party lost that solitary seat, and was dissolved.

Many of the Independent National Party's members, including Prüm, would later become associated with the Volksdeutsche Bewegung: a collaborationist Nazi party that governed during the German occupation.
