= Free List of Farmers, the Middle Class and Workers =

Defunct political party in Luxembourg

The Free List of Farmers, the Middle Class and Workers was a political party in Luxembourg.

== History ==
The party was linked to the Democratic List, with Pierre Prüm included on the list of both parties. It received 4.2% of the vote in the 1937 elections, winning a single seat. It did not contest any further elections.
