= Left Liberals =

Left-wing liberal party

The Left Liberals (French: Libéraux de gauche) were a political party in Luxembourg.

== History ==
The party was formed as a result of a split in the Liberal League by the 'old Liberals' including Robert Brasseur and Norbert Le Gallais; the other faction formed the Radical Socialist Party. In the 1925 elections it received 2.8% of the vote, winning a single seat.

The party did not contest any further elections, but retained its seat in the partial elections of 1928 as it was not up for election.
