= Radical Party (Luxembourg) =

The Radical Party was a political party in Luxembourg led by Marcel Cahen.

== History ==
The party was formed by Cahen in 1928 after he left the Radical Socialist Party. The party did not contest the partial elections later that year, but its one seat was not up for election. In the 1931 elections it won two seats. In 1934 it merged with the Radical Socialist Party to form the Radical Liberal Party.
