= Radical Liberal Party (Luxembourg) =

Luxembourgish political party (1934-1945)

The Radical Liberal Party (Luxembourgish: Radikal-Liberal Partei, RLP; French: Parti Radical Libéral, PRL) was a Luxembourgish political party that existed from 1934 until 1945. It was the main party bridging the gap between the former Liberal League and the current Democratic Party.

The party was founded on 18 February 1934 through a merger of the Radical Socialist Party (PRS) and the Radical Party (PR). The PRS had been the main group to emerge from the collapse of the Liberal League, whilst the Radical Party had broken away from the PRS in 1928. The two, however, continued to cooperate, and were reunited fully by the created of the Radical Liberal Party in 1934. In their first election, the partial elections held in 1934, the party won three seats out of the 29 up for election in the Chamber of Deputies. In 1937, the PLR lost two of the four seats it held in the Centre and North, bringing their total down to five seats out of 55 in the Chamber. This would be the last election that the party would fight.

The PRL was a part of the Luxembourgish government from 1934 until 1938, as the junior partner to the Party of the Right, which dominated inter-war politics. The PRL continued to exist until the political realignment brought about by the German occupation during Second World War. On 2 June 1945, the party was reconstituted as the Patriotic and Democratic Group, which would become the Democratic Party.

Leading members of the party included Nicolas Braunshausen, Gaston Diderich, Norbert Dumont, Étienne Schmit. Diderich was the Mayor of Luxembourg City for the duration of the party's existence, whilst the other three all held cabinet positions.

== See also ==
- Liberalism in Luxembourg
