= Kahler, Luxembourg =

Coordinates: 49°37.8′N 5°55′E

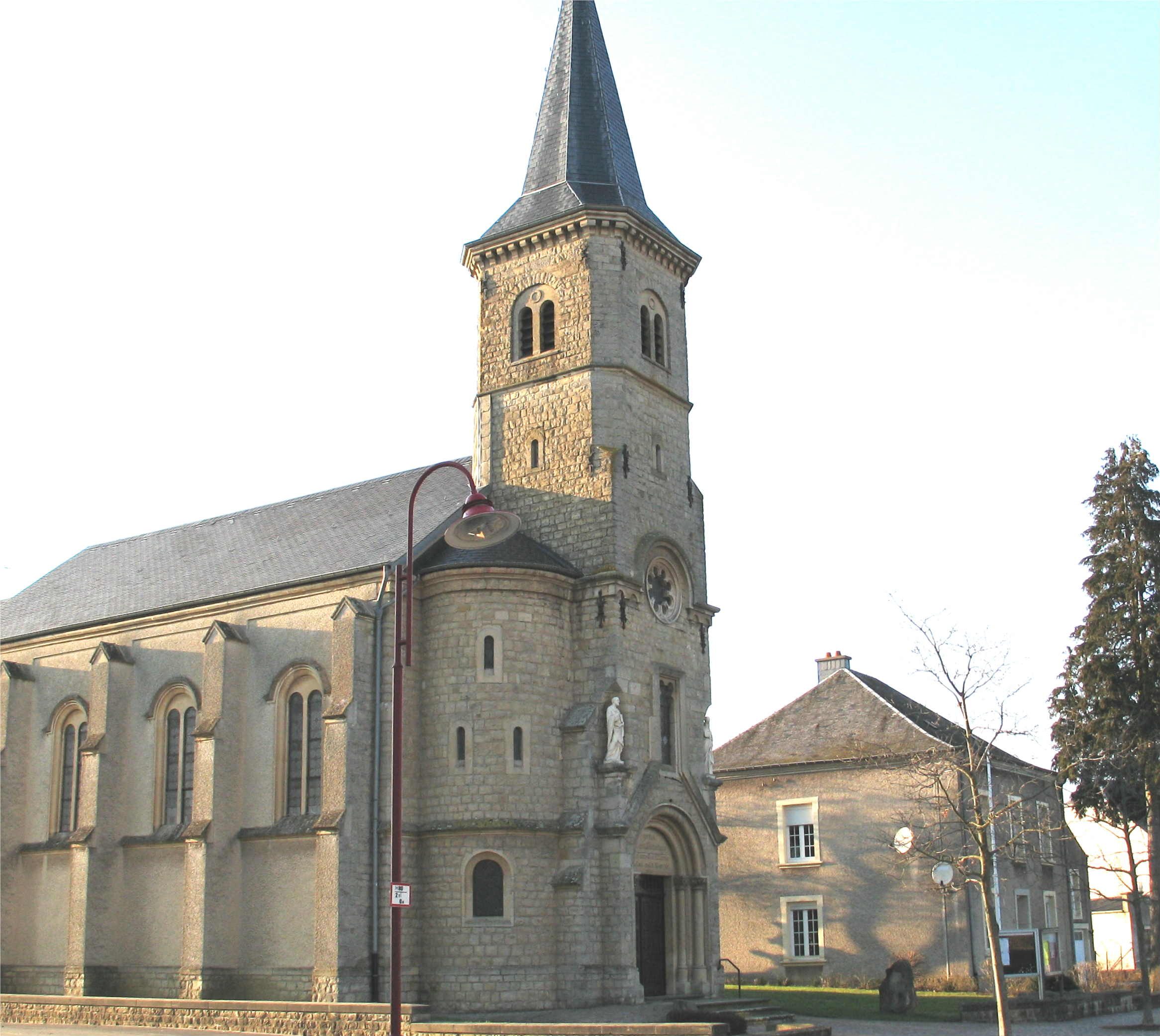
The church

Kahler (German pronunciation: [ˈkaːlɐ]; Luxembourgish: Koler) is a village in the commune of Garnich, in south-western Luxembourg. As of September 2026, the village has a population of 379.
