= Independent People's Party (Luxembourg) =

Former Luxembourg political party

The Independent People's Party (German: Unabhängige Volkspartei, French: Parti populaire indépendant) was a political party in Luxembourg.

== History ==
The party won five of the 53 seats in the 1918 Constitutional Assembly elections. In the general elections the following year it ran lists under different names in the different regions; in the Centre and Est it ran as "Independent People's Party", in Nord it ran as "Free People's Party", whilst in Sud it ran as "People's Party". In total it won two of the 48 seats in the Chamber of Deputies.

The party did not contest any further elections.
