= Party of Independents of the East =

Political party in Luxembourg

The Party of Independents of the East (French: Parti des Indépendants de l'Est) was a political party in Luxembourg.

== History ==
Headed by Othon Decker, the Cartel list contested the 1919 general elections, receiving 3% of the vote and winning one seat. By the 1925 elections it had become the Independent Left (Luxembourgish: Onofhängeg Lénkspartei) under Decker's leadership. The 1925 elections saw the party's vote share increase to 5% as it won two seats. It retained both seats in the partial elections in 1928, and did not contest the partial elections of 1931.

By the 1934 elections it had been renamed Party of Independents of the East. Increasing its vote share to 12%, the party won three seats in the Chamber of Deputies. It did not contest the 1937 partial elections in the north of the country.

Following World War II, the party received just 1.6% of the vote in the 1945 elections, winning a single seat. It did not contest any further elections, instead running as Socialist Independents of the East alongside the Luxembourg Socialist Workers' Party.
