= 1937 Luxembourg general election =

Partial general elections in Luxembourg

- 6 June 1937
- 26 of the 55 seats in the Chamber of Deputies; 28 seats needed for a majority
Party	Leader	Vote %	Seats	+/–
Party of the Right	Joseph Bech	44.05	25	0
Workers' Party		25.72	18	+4
Democratic List		10.99	2	New
Radical Liberal Party		10.67	5	−2
GLBMA		3.48	1	New
Liberal Party		2.98	1	New
PIE		–	3	0
This lists parties that won seats. See the complete results below.
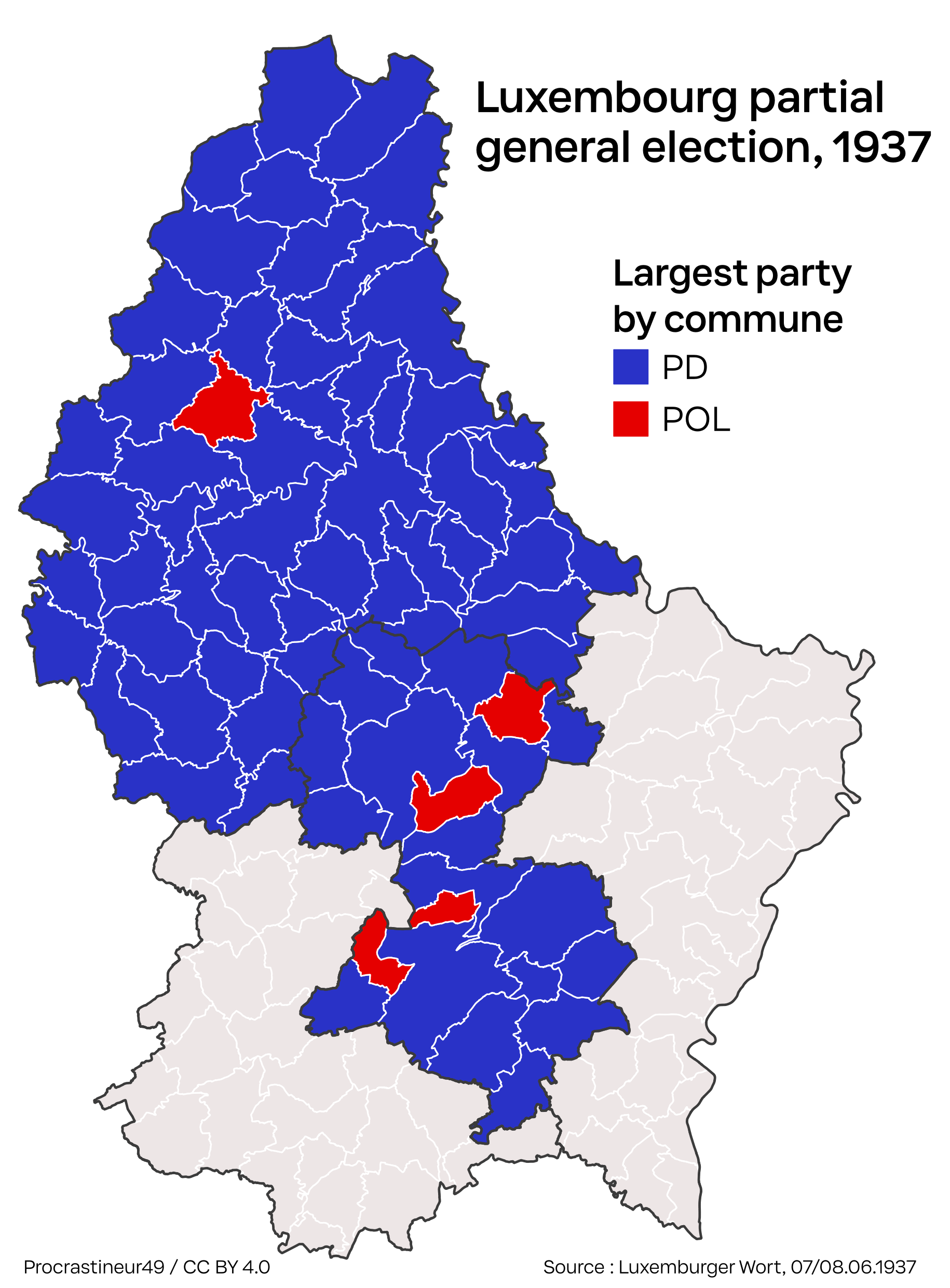
Results by commune
Prime Minister before	Prime Minister after
Joseph Bech; Party of the Right	Joseph Bech; Party of the Right

Partial general elections were held in Luxembourg on 6 June 1937, electing 26 of the 55 seats in the Chamber of Deputies in the centre and north of the country. The Party of the Right won 13 of the 26 seats and remained the largest party with 25 of the 55 seats.

== Results ==
Party	Votes	%	Seats			
Party	Votes	%	Not up	Elected	Total	+/–
Party of the Right	408,773	44.05	12	13	25	0
Luxembourg Workers' Party	238,665	25.72	11	7	18	+4
Democratic List	102,013	10.99	0	2	2	New
Radical Liberal Party	99,029	10.67	3	2	5	–2
Free List of Farmers, the Middle Class and Workers	32,265	3.48	0	1	1	New
Liberal Party	27,621	2.98	0	1	1	0
Party of Farmers and the Middle Class	19,634	2.12	0	0	0	–2
Party of Independents of the East			3	–	3	0
Total	928,000	100.00	29	26	55	+1
Valid votes	73,801	94.35				
Invalid/blank votes	4,419	5.65				
Total votes	78,220	100.00				
Source: Nohlen & Stöver
