= Radical Socialist Party (Luxembourg) =

The Radical Socialist Party (Luxembourgish: Radikal-Sozialistesch Partei, French: Parti Radical Socialist) was a progressive political party that existed in Luxembourg from 1925 to 1932. It was the successor of the Liberal League, but, unlike its predecessor, it existed as an organised extra-parliamentary party, marking itself as Luxembourg's first true liberal political party. It was the predecessor of the Radical Liberal Party and, ultimately, of the current Democratic Party.

== History ==
The party was founded following a split in the Liberal League, which had been riven by ideological splits between the classical liberal 'old liberals' led by the party's founder Robert Brasseur and the progressive 'new liberals' led by the Mayor of Luxembourg City, Gaston Diderich. When the Liberal League collapsed, the progressives reformed under Diderich's leadership as the Radical Socialist Party (the name reflecting its left-wing tendencies compared to its predecessor), whilst the old Liberals formed the Left Liberals.

The party was instantly accepted into a new coalition government, headed by Pierre Prüm of the small populist Independent National Party. The government lasted only one year, before falling apart due to ideological strains between its constituent parties and with the Socialist Party. In 1928, a faction broke away under the leadership of Marcel Cahens as a protest against the party's involvement in the Party of the Right government of Joseph Bech, becoming the Radical Party

However, the parties remained close, and eventually reunited in 1932 as the Radical Liberal Party, which would take part in governments from 1932 until 1938. After the Second World War, the liberal movement would find itself united again with the emergence of the Democratic Party.

== Bibliography ==
- Hearl, Derek (1988). "The Luxembourg Liberal Party". In Emil Kirchner (ed.). Liberal Parties in Western Europe. Cambridge: Cambridge University Press. pp. 373–395. ISBN 0-521-32394-0.
