= Émile Reuter =

Luxembourgish politician (1874–1973)

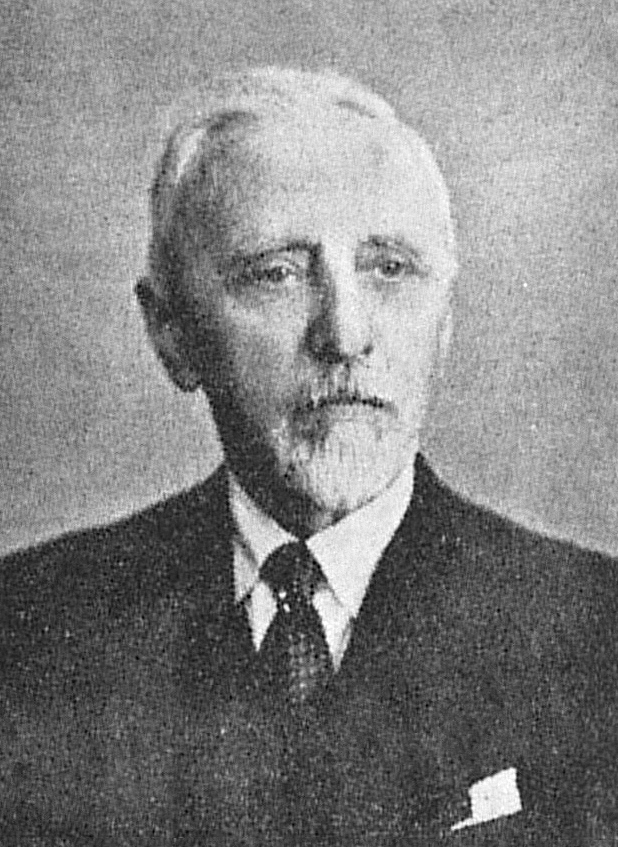
- Reuter in 1946

Prime Minister of Luxembourg
- In office 28 September 1918 – 20 March 1925
- Monarchs: Marie-Adélaïde; Charlotte
- Preceded by: Léon Kauffman
- Succeeded by: Pierre Prüm

Personal details
- Born: 2 August 1874 Bofferdange, Luxembourg
- Died: 14 February 1973 (aged 98) Luxembourg, Luxembourg
- Party: Right

Émile Reuter (2 August 1874 – 14 February 1973) was a Luxembourgish politician. He served as prime minister of Luxembourg for six years, from 28 September 1918 until 20 March 1925.

== Life ==
After finishing school in 1893 at the Athénée de Luxembourg, Émile Reuter studied law in Strasbourg, Nancy and Paris from 1894 to 1898 and then registered at the bar in Luxembourg. In 1903 he became president of the Association populaire catholique and in 1911 was elected to the Chamber of Deputies. In 1914, he was a founding member of the Party of the Right. Shortly before the end of World War I, on 28 September 1918 Reuter became prime minister and Director-General (Minister) for Foreign Affairs and the Interior. In 1925, there was a crisis in the government when the Chamber rejected the government's proposals to amalgamate the railway companies Guillaume-Luxembourg and Prince-Henri under Belgian direction. The Reuter Ministry then resigned. From 1926 to 1959 (apart from the years of the German occupation in World War II) he was president of the Chamber of Deputies. Until 1964, he was also the first president of the Christian Social People's Party (CSV), founded in 1944. In 1957, he became ambassador of Luxembourg to the Holy See.

He died on 14 February 1973 in Luxembourg City, aged 98. The Avenue Émile-Reuter was named after him in the city.

== See also ==
- Reuter Ministry

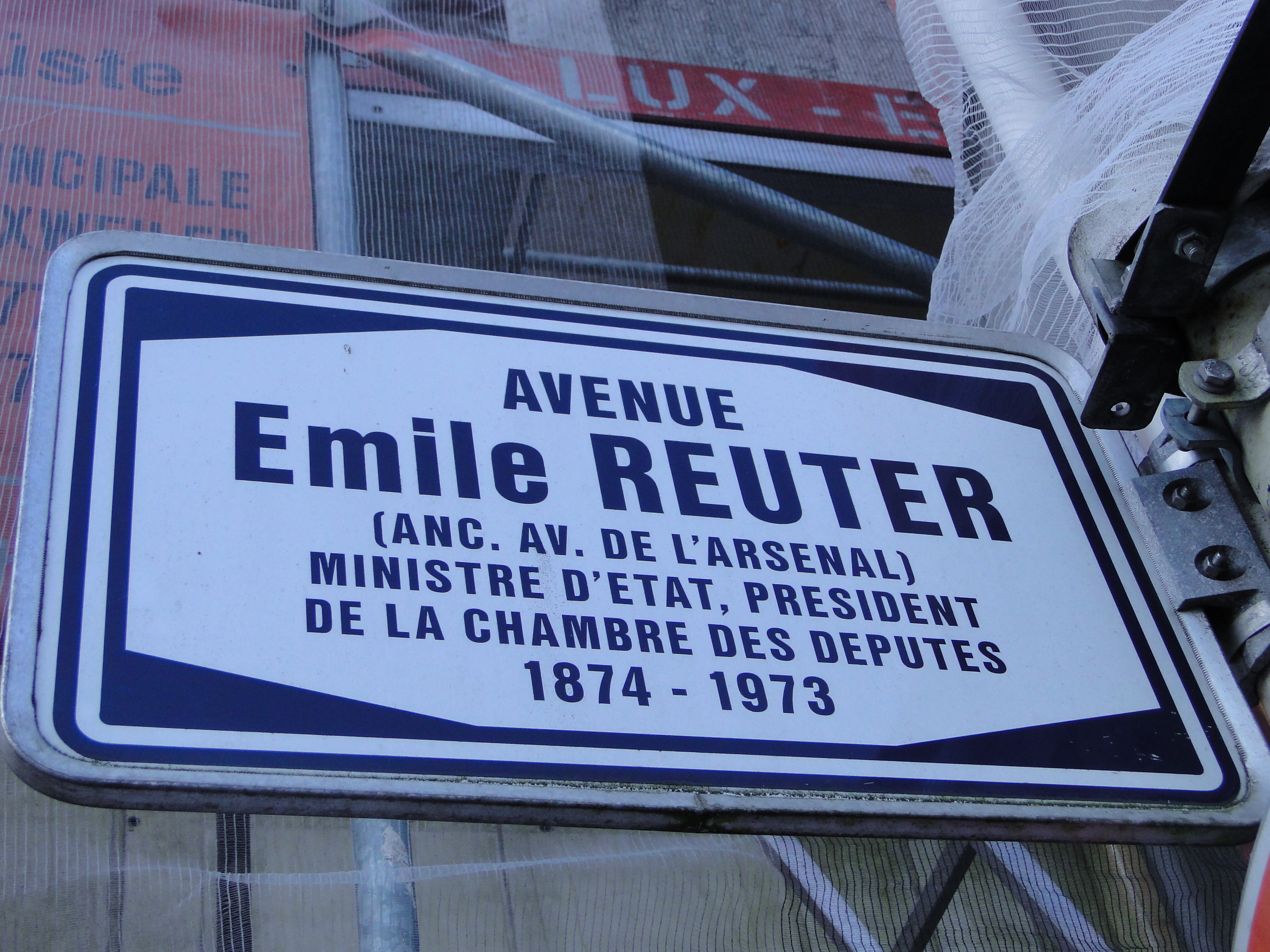

Political offices
Preceded by Léon Kauffmann	Prime Minister of Luxembourg; 1918–1925	Succeeded by Pierre Prüm
Preceded by Léon Kauffmann	Director-General for Foreign Affairs; 1918–1925	Succeeded by Pierre Prüm
Preceded by René Blum	President of the Chamber of Deputies; 1st time 1926–1944	Succeeded by Nicolas Wirtgen
Preceded by Nicolas Wirtgen	President of the Chamber of Deputies; 2nd time 1945–1958	Succeeded by Joseph Bech
Party political offices
New title New party formed after World War II	President of the CSV; 1945–1964	Succeeded by Tony Biever
Records
Preceded by Joseph Paul-Boncour	Oldest living state leader 28 March 1972 – 14 February 1973	Succeeded by Dezső Pattantyús-Ábrahám
