= Liberal League (Luxembourg) =

Political party in Luxembourg

The Liberal League (Luxembourgish: Liberal Liga; French: Ligue Libérale; German: Liberale Liga) was a political party in Luxembourg between 1904 and 1925. It was the indirect predecessor of the Democratic Party (DP), which has been one of the three major parties in Luxembourg since the Second World War.

For the first decade of its existence, the Liberal League maintained the liberal dominance under Prime Minister Paul Eyschen. In 1908, they formed an alliance with the Socialists, leading to confrontations with the Party of the Right over secularism. During the First World War, the party lost much of its advantage, and was replaced as the dominant party by the Party of the Right. In the early 1920s, riven by rivalries between its classical liberal and progressive wings, the party collapsed.

== Foundation ==
The liberal Liberal League was founded in 1904 as a formalisation of the decentralised ideological alliance already existing within the Chamber of Deputies, under the leadership of the classical liberal Robert Brasseur. The liberal faction was predominantly supported by the entrepreneurial and middle classes. Nonetheless, in 1908, the Liberal League and the Socialist Party (formed in 1902) formed a seemingly unlikely alliance, called the 'Left Bloc' (Bloc de la Gauche) in Esch-sur-Alzette. The main aim of this alliance was to ensure and extend the secularism of the state, which they saw as being under attack from the overtly Roman Catholic conservative grouping; secularisation of the school system was the major policy on which they fought the elections of 1908, 1911, and 1912.

The liberals were the dominant force, and the chief liberal, Paul Eyschen, had been prime minister for sixteen years (and would be for another eleven). However, despite Eyschen's support for the party and the clear legislative support for Eyschen amongst the party's large representation in the Chamber, he never formally enrolled in the party. Similarly, neither did his cabinet ministers, which would have major repercussions for the party after Eyschen's death, in 1915. The informality of the arrangement would lead to the collapse of the liberal-led governments of Mathias Mongenast and Victor Thorn; the former was forced out by Grand Duchess Marie-Adélaïde, whilst the former was brought down by a cross-party motion of no confidence.

Despite these reverses, the Liberal League still maintained considerable power in the Chamber of Deputies until the end of the German occupation. However, after the war, a host of constitutional amendments undermined their power base. Most notably, the liberals were harmed by the introduction of female suffrage; women were thought of as leaning towards the conservatives, undermining the liberals' hitherto unchallenged advantage in Luxembourg City and other cities.

== Collapse ==
The expansion of suffrage, together with the loss of the old guard that had dominated Luxembourgish politics for the previous thirty years, caused the Liberal League's political base to be eroded. Two ideological groupings emerged in the party: the 'old' classical liberals and the 'young' progressive liberals. The former camp was led by Robert Brasseur, whilst the latter was led by Gaston Diderich. A deputy from the Socialists defected to the Liberal League, forming a 'radical socialist' caucus within the party that was openly opposed to Brasseur's leadership.

In 1925, the old liberals were virtually wiped out, leading to the collapse of the party. The party was succeeded by the Radical Socialist Party, the Liberal Left, the Radical Party. In 1932, the parties re-united under the name of the Radical Liberal Party, which would go on to become the nucleus of the modern Democratic Party after the war.

== See also ==
- Liberalism in Luxembourg, for a more comprehensive overview of its ideological successors
