= Pierre Prüm =

Politician from Luxembourg

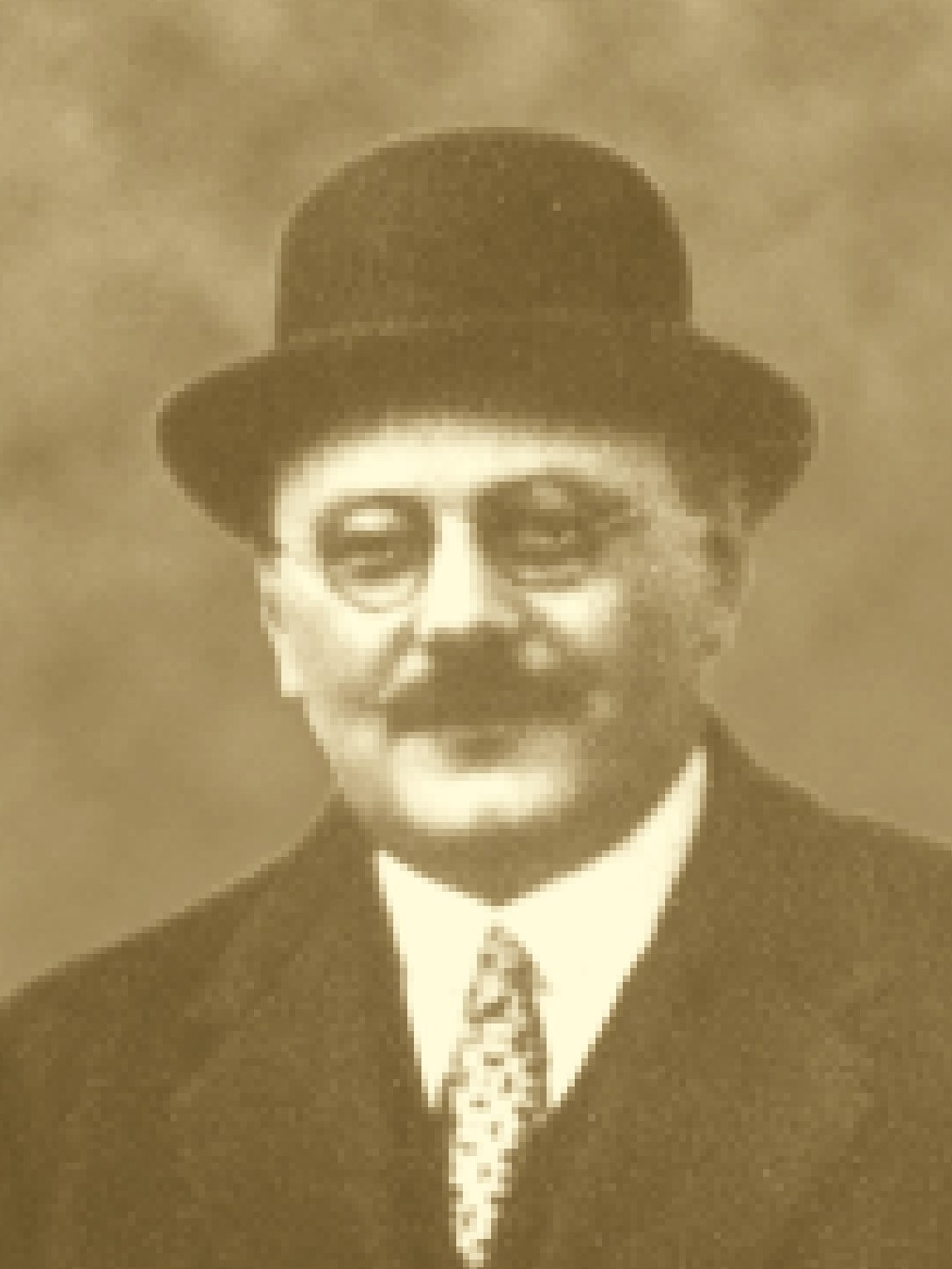

Prime Minister of Luxembourg
- In office 20 March 1925 – 16 July 1926
- Monarch: Charlotte
- Preceded by: Émile Reuter
- Succeeded by: Joseph Bech

Personal details
- Born: 9 July 1886 Troisvierges, Luxembourg
- Died: 1 February 1950 (aged 63) Clervaux, Luxembourg
- Party: Independent National

Pierre Prüm (9 July 1886 – 1 February 1950) was a Luxembourgish politician and jurist. He was served as prime minister of Luxembourg for a year, from 20 March 1925 until 16 July 1926.

== Early life ==
Prüm was born in Troisvierges, in the far north of the Grand Duchy, on 9 July 1886. His father, Émile Prüm, was a fervent Roman Catholic and a prominent conservative politician, and this greatly affected his political outlook. He and his brother Emmanuel were sent to university at Leuven, where he joined K.A.V. Lovania Leuven, a Catholic fraternity.

While his brother became a priest, Pierre trained as a lawyer. Like his father, he sought political office, and entered politics himself, representing the canton of Clervaux in the Chamber of Deputies. As a conservative, he joined the Party of the Right (PD) when it was founded, in 1914. However, Prüm left the Party of the Right in 1918 to form his own party, the Independent National Party (PNI).

== Prime minister ==
=== Formation ===
The Chamber of Deputies' rejection of the railway treaty with Belgium brought about the Reuter government's resignation. As it was not possible for a new government majority to be formed, the Chamber was dissolved and new general elections were called for 1 March 1925. The election saw various changes in the political landscape, as nine different political parties were henceforth represented in the Chamber. The right lost its absolute majority, and held on to 22 out of 47. But it refused to enter into coalition with any party that had voted against the railway treaty. Pierre Prüm, leader of the Independent National Party, was asked to form a new government, and relied on an eclectic alliance of liberals, socialists, some Deputies on the right.

=== Foreign policy ===
At the risk of provoking a break-up of the UEBL, Pierre Prüm sought a rapprochement with France. When he had only just taken office, the prime minister was received in Paris. On 9 October 1925, an agreement was reached with the Direction Générale des Chemins de fer d’Alsace et de Lorraine. This agreement gave France the provisional right to the Guillaume-Luxembourg network. During the Prüm government's time in office, the Locarno Treaties were also signed. Although they came about without Luxembourgish participation, they marked an important date in the evolution of the Grand Duchy's defence policy. The fact that France and Germany guaranteed the inviolability of national borders, and agreed not to use war, consolidated Luxembourg's international situation. Pierre Prüm made use of Locarno Treaties' possibilities for international arbitration, to start talks with the Belgian and French governments. These would only conclude under the next government.

=== Social policy ===
Although the Socialist Party was not directly represented in the government, it constituted the Prüm government's main support, alongside the Independent National Party. Under the impetus of the socialists, the government took a number of social measures. One of its first acts was to re-establish the workers' delegations, in factories with over 20 workers. However, the bill on workers' holidays, which was debated in the Chamber from May 1926, divided the liberals and socialists. As it no longer had a parliamentary majority, the Prüm government resigned on 15 July 1926.

== Government ==
In 1925, the PNI seized upon the inability of the PD government to pass railway reforms. In the legislative elections of 1 March, the ruling Party of the Right lost its majority in the Chamber of Deputies, winning only 22 of the 47 seats. Unwilling to form a coalition with any parties that had blocked its railway reforms, Prüm was invited to form a government, provided that he could form a majority coalition. Taking in an eclectic collection of Radical Socialists and dissident conservatives, with the additional informal backing of the Socialist Party, Prüm's government took office on 20 March.

Prüm sought to improve relations with France and Germany, which had been alienated by the formation of the Belgium-Luxembourg Economic Union in 1921. On 9 October, Prüm negotiated a working arrangement on the co-ordination of iron production in France and Luxembourg. At the same time, the Locarno Treaties were signed between seven European states (not including Luxembourg); the treaties confirmed the inviolability of the French and Belgian borders with Germany as drawn by the Treaty of Versailles. These two arrangements would go a considerable distance towards calming the tensions over Luxembourg that had flared up during and after the First World War.

When the government turned its attention back to domestic affairs, it did not fare so well. The Socialist Party had supported Prüm throughout 1925, despite not being rewarded with a cabinet position. As a mark of its debt to the Socialists, in May 1926, the government sought to introduce a bill improving working conditions. The Liberals, who predominantly represented employers and the professional class, were angered, and withdrew their support for the government. Without a majority, Prüm tendered his resignation to Grand Duchess Charlotte on 22 June.

== Later life ==
In 1926, Prüm became a justice of the peace in Clervaux, where he served for ten years. In the 1937 election, Prüm was elected to the Chamber of Deputies once again, representing the Nord constituency. When Nazi Germany occupied Luxembourg in 1940, he left the pro-Nazi Society for German Literature and Art (GEDELIT).

After the war, he was prosecuted for collaborationism, and was sentenced on 28 November 1946 to four years imprisonment. He died on 1 February 1950 in Clervaux.

== Footnotes ==
Political offices
Preceded by Émile Reuter	Prime Minister of Luxembourg; 1925–1926	Succeeded by Joseph Bech
Preceded by Émile Reuter	Director-General for Foreign Affairs; 1925–1926	Succeeded by Joseph Bech
