= Hubert Loutsch =

Prime Minister of Luxembourg (1878–1946)

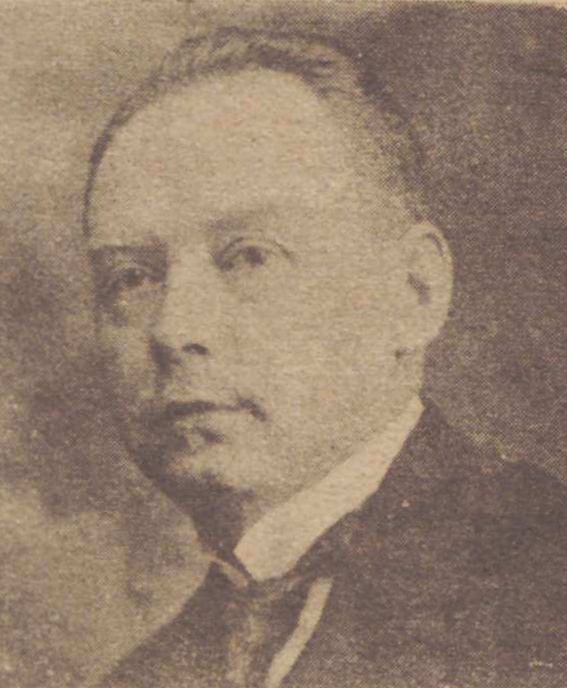

Prime Minister of Luxembourg
- In office 6 November 1915 – 24 February 1916
- Monarch: Marie-Adélaïde
- Preceded by: Mathias Mongenast
- Succeeded by: Victor Thorn

Personal details
- Born: 18 November 1878 Mondercange, Luxembourg
- Died: 24 June 1946 (aged 67) Brussels, Belgium
- Party: National Independent Union

Hubert Loutsch (18 November 1878 – 24 June 1946) was a Luxembourgish politician. He served as prime minister of Luxembourg for 16 weeks, from 6 November 1915 until 24 February 1916.

Loutsch was a lawyer by profession. On 6 November 1915 he was appointed prime minister, and Director-General (Minister) for Foreign Affairs. The Loutsch Ministry consisted only of members of the Right Party, but the Left had a majority in the Chamber of Deputies. Thereafter, Grand Duchess Marie-Adélaïde dissolved the legislature and ordered new elections to be held on 23 December 1915. The new Chamber, however, also did not give the Right Party a majority. On 11 January 1916 the Loutsch government lost a confidence vote, and Loutsch was succeeded by Victor Thorn on 24 February 1916.

From 1920 to 1934 he was president of the insurance company La Luxembourgeoise. From 1925 to 1934 he was a Deputy in the Chamber for the Union nationale indépendante.

He died in 1946 in Brussels and was buried at Luxembourg City's Fetschenhof cemetery.

Political offices
Preceded by Mathias Mongenast	Prime Minister of Luxembourg; 1915–1916	Succeeded by Victor Thorn
Preceded by Mathias Mongenast	Director-General for Foreign Affairs; 1915–1916	Succeeded by Victor Thorn
