= Party of the Right (Luxembourg) =

Party of the Right Rietspartei
- Founded: 16 January 1914
- Dissolved: 1944/1945
- Succeeded by: Christian Social People's Party
- Ideology: Christian democracy Conservatism
- European affiliation: White International

The Party of the Right (Luxembourgish: Rietspartei, French: Parti de la droite, German: Rechtspartei), abbreviated to PD, was a political party in Luxembourg between 1914 and 1944. It was the direct predecessor of the Christian Social People's Party (CSV), which has ruled Luxembourg for all but fifteen years since.

== Origins ==
Before World War I, politics in Luxembourg was in the era of notables and census suffrage: public political life was restricted to a small minority. The notion of a "party" did not exist in the modern sense; the word referred to political schools of thought, loose groupings of like-minded people, and sometimes, committees organised shortly before elections.

There was, then, no Catholic party in the strict sense, even though there was a group in the Chamber of Deputies appealing to this tendency. The members of this opposition group, numbering 17 Deputies (out of 52) in 1912, came primarily from rural cantons. They consisted of notables grouped around strong personalities, such as Émile Prüm (from Clervaux) or Philippe Bech (from Grevenmacher).

In 1902, the Luxemburger Zeitung identified two currents among the "reactionaries": the clerical-agrarians, and the Christian-socials. It identified the heads of the clerical-agrarians as Émile Prüm, Joseph Brincourt and Philippe Bech. The Christian-social stream included Émile Reuter, A. Kayser and Auguste Thorn.

At the start of the century, Émile Prüm tried, in vain, to introduce the concept of a "Catholic party" or "Catholic people's party" (”Katholische Volkspartei”). Neither the foundation of the Social Democratic Party in 1902 (the modern-day Luxembourg Socialist Workers' Party), nor that of the Liberal League in 1904 prompted the creation of an organised Catholic party in response.

== Foundation ==
The conservative PD was founded on 16 January 1914. Present at the founding were Émile Reuter, Émile Prüm, Mgr. Schiltz, Albert Philippe, Pierre Dupong, Joseph Bech and Mgr. Jean Origer. The founding of the party in 1914 was a reaction to the formalisation of the other ideological alliances within the Chamber of Deputies. The Social Democratic Party formed in 1902, whilst the dominant Liberal League was founded in 1904. The party's foundation also took part in a climate of Kulturkampf. When the Education Law of 1912 was passed by a majority in the Chamber of Deputies, several right-wing figures became convinced that it was necessary to organise themselves into a political party.

The name "Catholic People's Party" had initially been suggested, but was later rejected in favour of the term "Party of the Right", so as to be able to appeal to non-Catholics as well.

== Overview ==
The PD benefited from the break-up of the Socialist-Liberal alliance after the death of Paul Eyschen, and soon became the dominant party, strengthened by the introduction of universal suffrage in 1918. The leader of the Party of the Right would serve as the prime minister from the end of the First World War until the start of the Second, except for a fourteen-month period in the mid-1920s.

The three prime ministers from the Party of the Right were Émile Reuter (1918–1925), Joseph Bech (1926–1937), and Pierre Dupong (1937–1944); the latter two would go on to serve as prime minister as heads of the CSV. It is also notable that the PD cabinet of 1921–1925 was the only cabinet in Luxembourgish history that included politicians of only one party.

The historian Gilbert Trausch distinguished two streams within the party: on the one hand, agrarian conservatives, who defended the interests of farmers and traditional values, and were ambivalent or hostile towards the world of industry. These rural notables were also hostile towards universal suffrage. On the other hand, were the innovators, generally slightly younger than the first group, and who were inspired by Christian social ideas, and the conviction that social reforms were necessary; this second group was more favourable towards universal suffrage. Émile Prüm and Philippe Bech belonged to the former of these groups, while Emile Reuter and Pierre Dupong represented the latter.

The close relationship between the Catholic Church and the party was illustrated by the presence in the party of the priest Jean Origer, the director of the Luxemburger Wort, and head of the party in the Chamber of Deputies; and of Jean-Baptiste Esch, a writer for the Luxemburger Wort.

== Election results ==
Chamber of Deputies
Election	Seats	Vote percentage
1915	25 / 53	–
1918	23 / 53	43.40%
1919	27 / 48	56.25%
1922	25 / 48	52.08%
1925	22 / 47	46.81%
1928	23 / 52	44.23%
1931	26 / 54	48.15%
1934	25 / 54	46.30%
1937	25 / 55	45.45%

== References and further reading ==
- Blau, Lucien (October 1986). "Der "christlich-berufsständische Staat": Das Reformprogramm des J. B. Esch" (PDF). Forum (in German) (90): 37–39.
- Blau, Lucien (October 2000). "Du parti de la droite au Parti chrétien-social: Un tour de force réussi" (PDF). Forum (in French) (203): 25–30.
- Spizzo, Daniel (November 1995). "De 1919 à 1939: Le parti catholique et la genèse du "nationalisme" luxembourgeois" (PDF). Forum (in French) (163): 20–24.
- Thewes, Guy (May 2011). Les gouvernements du Grand-Duché de Luxembourg depuis 1848 (PDF) (in French). Luxembourg City: Service Information et Presse. ISBN 978-2-87999-212-9.
