= Werner-Schaus I Government =

Coalition government of Luxembourg from 1959 to 1964

- Cabinet of Luxembourg
- 1959-1964
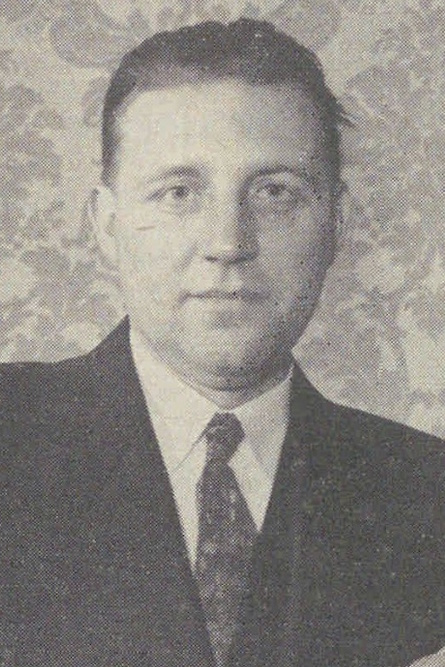
- Date formed: 2 March 1959
- Date dissolved: 15 July 1964 (5 years, 4 months, 1 week and 6 days)

People and organisations
- Grand Duchess: Charlotte
- Prime Minister: Pierre Werner
- Deputy Prime Minister: Eugène Schaus
- Total no. of members: 7
- Member parties: CSV; DP
- Status in legislature: Centre to centre-right coalition government
- Opposition parties: LSAP; KPL

History
- Election: 1959 general election
- Legislature term: 22nd Legislature of the Chamber of Deputies
- Predecessor: Frieden Government
- Successor: Werner-Cravatte Government

The first Werner-Schaus Government was the government of Luxembourg between 2 March 1959 and 15 July 1964. It was a coalition between the Christian Social People's Party (CSV), and the Democratic Party. It was formed after the general election of 1959 and the sudden death of prime minister Pierre Frieden.

== Ministers ==
| Name | Portrait | Party | Office |
|---|---|---|---|
| Pierre Werner | | CSV | Prime Minister; Minister for Finances |
| Eugène Schaus | | DP | Deputy Prime Minister; Minister for Foreign Affairs and Foreign Trade; Minister for the Armed Forces |
| Émile Colling | | CSV | Minister for Work and Social Security; Minister for Public Health |
| Robert Schaffner | | DP | Minister for Public Works; Minister for Physical Education |
| Émile Schaus | | CSV | Minister for Agriculture; Minister for National Education, Population, and the Family |
| Paul Elvinger | | DP | Minister for Economic Affairs and the Middle Class |
| Pierre Grégoire | | CSV | Minister for the Interior, Religion, the Arts, and Science; Minister for Transport |

== Formation ==
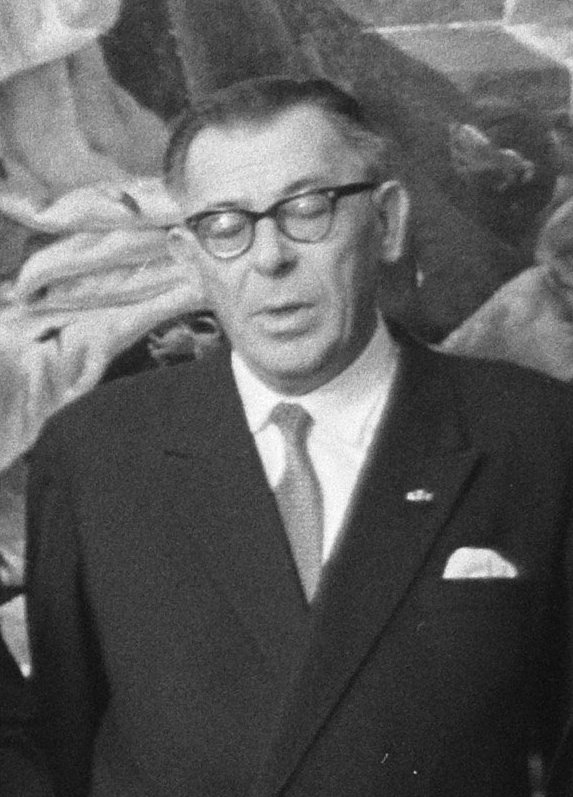
Eugène Schaus, deputy prime minister

The early elections of 1 February 1959 put an end to the coalition between the CSV and the LSAP which had dominated the preceding decade. While the LSAP retained the 17 seats it had received in 1954, the CSV lost five seats. The conflict between the Farmers' Central and the government had cost the CSV many votes among its rural base. The Democratic Party, since 1955 the successor of the Patriotic and Democratic Group, was the winner of the election. The liberals received 11 seats, and presented themselves as the alternative to the LSAP in a coalition government. Despite its losses, with 21 seats the CSV remained the largest political force in the country. The Grand Duchess asked Pierre Werner to form a government, after Pierre Frieden had declined to do so for health reasons; Frieden died on 23 February 1959. Until the new government took office on 2 March, the departments under Frieden were distributed on an interim basis to the other government members: Central Administration to Joseph Bech, the Interior to Pierre Werner, Education, Arts and Sciences, Religion, Population and Family to Émile Colling.

== Foreign policy ==
=== Belgian partnership ===
The project of European construction in which the government had participated throughout the 1950s had modified the relations between Luxembourg and its neighbouring countries, especially Belgium. The creation of a common European market had repercussions for the structures of the Belgium–Luxembourg Economic Union (UEBL), and made it necessary to revise the treaty of 1921, long before it was due to expire in 1972. In the late 1950s, the two partners started negotiations to re-examine the UEBL. On 29 January 1963, three protocols were signed to adapt the UEBL to the new international situation. The agreements were intended to harmonise the two countries' economic policies, especially with regards to agricultural trade and excise duties; to redefine the currency regime and increase the volume of notes printed by the Luxembourgish authorities; and finally to introduce a "Committee of Ministers" similar to the Council of Ministers of the EEC. Through the agreements of 1963, the two partners showed their desire to treat each other as equals within the UEBL.

=== Army reform ===
The Werner-Schaus government was committed to a structural reform of the Luxembourg Army. From November 1959, Eugène Schaus undertook consultations with the military authorities of NATO about reducing military service to nine months. However, its partners in the Atlantic alliance showed little enthusiasm for the restructuring plans of the Luxembourgish minister. They insisted that Luxembourg fulfil its international obligations: as a NATO member, it was expected to provide a direct contribution to NATO and participate in common defence. The government's military policy in the 1960s consisted of reconciling Luxembourg's international engagements with a public opinion that was increasingly hostile to compulsory military service.

=== Treaty with Germany ===
The government also pursued its negotiations with the Federal Republic of Germany, started under Joseph Bech. 15 years after the war, it was felt that relations between the two countries should be normalised. On 11 July 1959, the two countries' foreign ministers signed a treaty dealing with various Germano-Luxembourgish disputes, and establishing compensation for the victims of the occupation. This agreement, criticised as the "treaty of shame", was attacked by those Luxembourgers who had been forcibly conscripted into the Wehrmacht in World War II, and felt discriminated compared to the members of the Resistance. The treaty of 1959 was not ratified until 1961, after bitter debates in the Chamber of Deputies and a protest on the Place Guillaume that attracted 10,000 members of the Federation of Forcibly Conscripted Victims of Nazism.

== Economic policy ==
In 1959, the closure of the last leather factory, the company "Idéal" in Wiltz, provoked a reorientation of government policy on industrial investments. The authorities were conscious of the danger in the monolithic nature of the Luxembourgish economy. During the 1950s, the economy had almost entirely relied on the steel industry. Traditional activities which had once flourished, such as slate production, tanneries and furniture manufacturing, were not able to keep pace with international competition and gradually disappeared. This deindustrialisation especially affected the rural regions of the North and the East. This reinforced the imbalance between the country's rural, farming areas, and the mining basin, where the iron and steel industry was concentrated.

From 1959, the government led an active policy of economic diversification and development in order to modernise the nation's industries, slow the exodus from rural areas, and maintain a regional balance. Thus, it created a Board of Industrial Development (BID), which aimed to persuade American industrialists who wanted to get round the custom tariffs of the Common Market, to create production facilities in Luxembourg. The Grand Ducal court, which enjoyed a certain amount of prestige across the Atlantic, was closely associated with this campaign, and the presidency of the BID was given to Prince Charles of Luxembourg, the son of the Grand Duchess. A law on economic expansion, passed on 2 June 1962, gave the government the means to attract foreign investments by granting low-interest loans and tax incentives.

Thanks to these measures, the redevelopment of the Wiltz region was seen through. By 1965, seven businesses working mostly for the foreign market and employing 560 people were established in the city. However, the biggest successes of the diversification effort came towards the mid-1960s, when DuPont established itself in Contern and Monsanto in Echternach.

=== Infrastructure ===
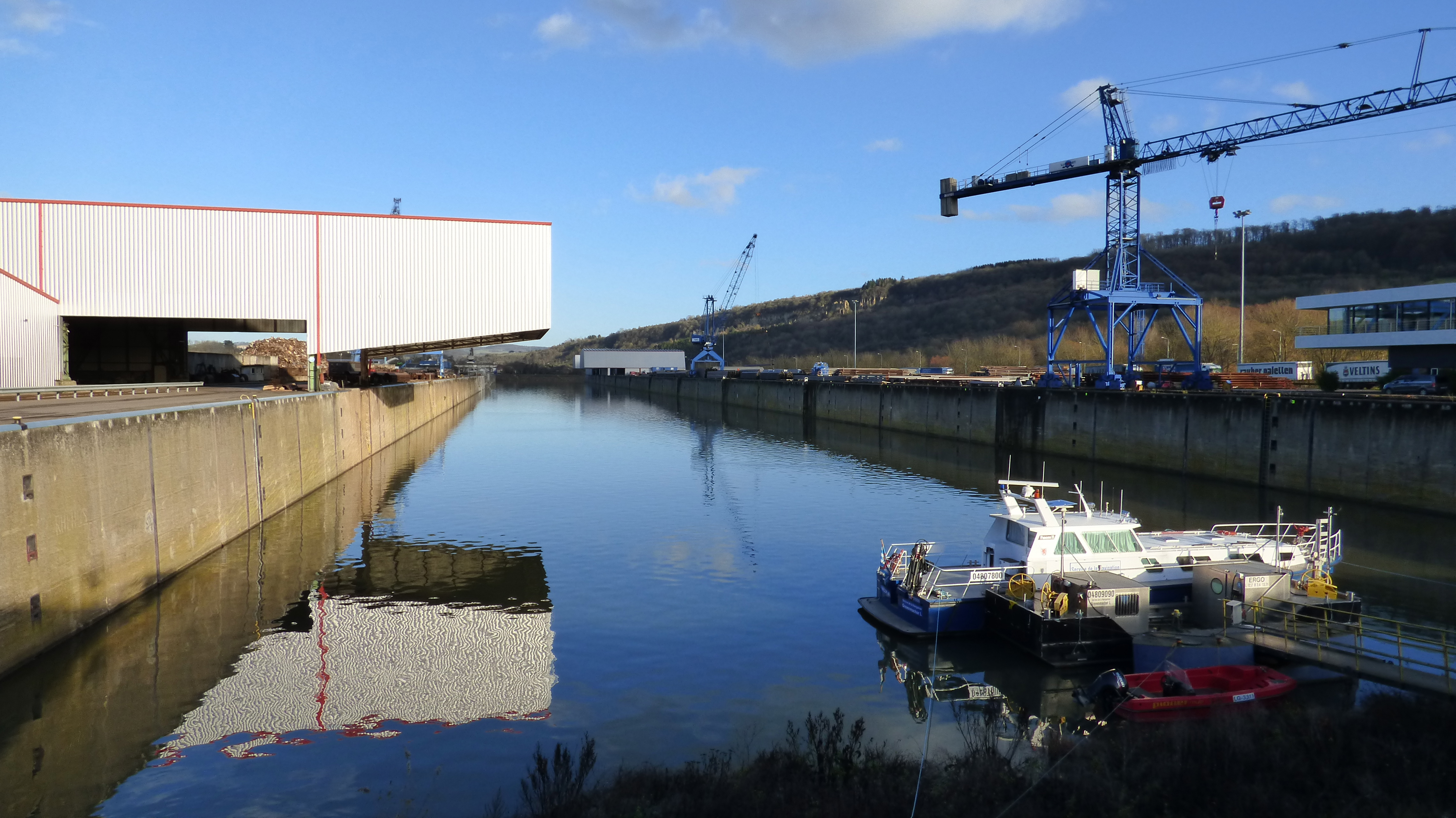
Port of Mertert, 2016

In addition, the Werner-Schaus government continued its efforts to modernise and enlarge the country's economic infrastructure. The law of 22 July 1963 created the port of Mertert. The canalisation of the Moselle was finished by 1964. On 26 May 1964, the first official trip was taken on the new waterway which gave Luxembourgish steel access to maritime ports, in the presence of French President Charles de Gaulle and West German President Heinrich Lübke. On 17 April 1964, the hydro-electric plant at Vianden was opened.

=== Kirchberg ===
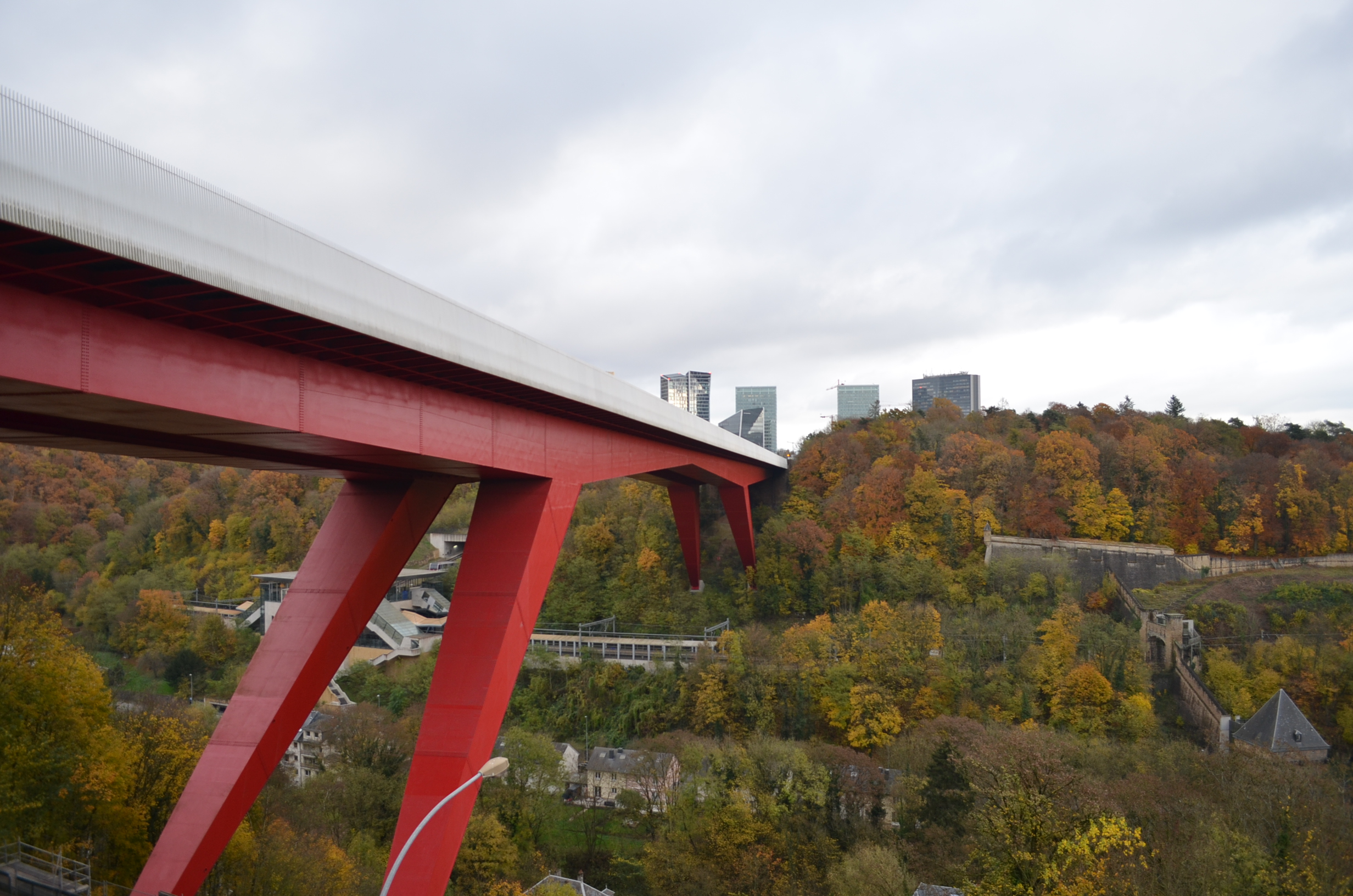
The finished Grand Duchess Charlotte Bridge

Apart from finishing the construction projects started under previous governments, the Werner-Schaus government also started another large infrastructure programme: expanding Luxembourg City towards the East. The law of 7 August 1961 created a Fund for Urbanisation and Development of the Plateau of Kirchberg. The development of more than 300 hectares opened up a new space, intended to host the European institutions. The Luxembourgish government constructed a European quarter on the Kirchberg, and would then lease the buildings to the European Communities. The decision to erect a European administrative centre constituted another asset in its policy aiming to make Luxembourg the permanent headquarters of one, several, or all European institutions. The construction of the Grand Duchess Charlotte Bridge, spanning the valley between the city centre and the Kirchberg plateau, started in 1963.

== Social policy ==
When it had only just assumed office, the government was confronted with a social conflict which risked paralysing the mining and steel industries. Employers refused to negotiate a new collective contract for the factories and mines. In August 1959, trade unions threatened to call a strike. The government eventually managed to persuade both sides to turn to a neutral arbiter, namely Henri Rieben, a professor at the University of Lausanne; this allowed both unions and employers to save face. The pay rise which was finally decided took into account the productivity and profitability of the businesses. Rieben's arbitration showed the will of the actors to enter into a dynamic of social partnership, and to resort to negotiation rather than confrontation.

The Werner-Schaus government enacted several laws to extend the social security system. In 1960, a pension fund for commercial and industrial businesses, and a National Solidarity Fund, were created. In 1962, social protection was extended to rural workers with the introduction of a health insurance fund for farmers. In 1963, civil servants received a salary review which increased their allowance considerably. Finally, they enacted a large-scale pensions reform. The law of 13 May 1964 unified the principles of funding the contribution systems for old-age pensions, and regulated the adaptation of pensions to pay rises.
