= Pierre Frieden Government =

Coalition government of Luxembourg from 1958 to 1959

Frieden Government
- Cabinet of Luxembourg
- 1958-1959
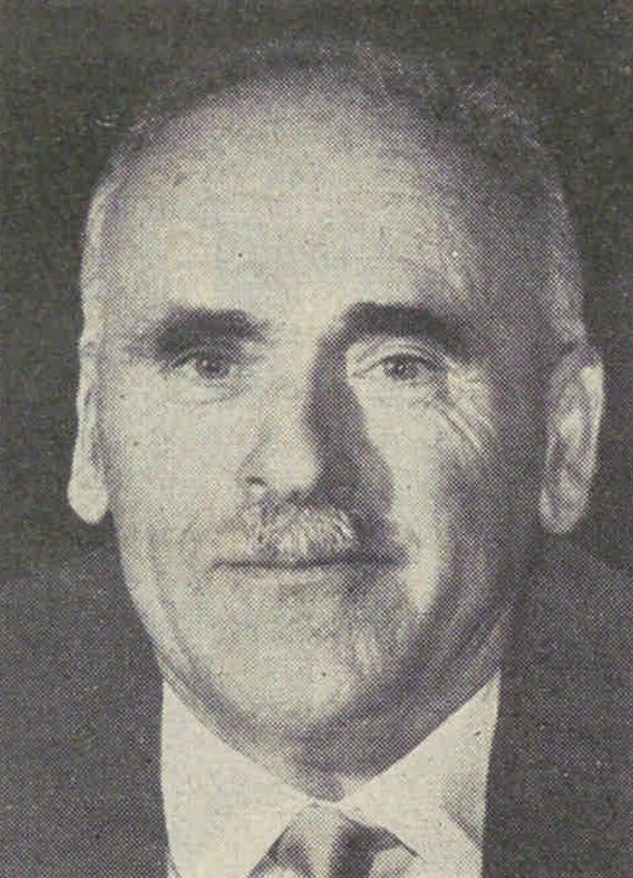
- Date formed: 29 March 1958
- Date dissolved: 2 March 1959 (11 months and 2 days)

People and organisations
- Grand Duchess: Charlotte
- Prime Minister: Pierre Frieden
- Total no. of members: 8
- Member parties: CSV; LSAP
- Status in legislature: Centre-left to centre-right coalition government
- Opposition parties: DP; KPL

History
- Election: 1954 general election
- Legislature term: 21st Legislature of the Chamber of Deputies
- Predecessor: Bech-Bodson Government
- Successor: Werner-Schaus I Government

The Frieden Government was the government of Luxembourg between 29 March 1958 and 23 February 1959 until the death of Pierre Frieden. It was a coalition between the Christian Social People's Party (CSV), and the Luxembourg Socialist Workers' Party (LSAP).

== Ministers ==
Name	Portrait	Party	Office
Pierre Frieden		CSV	Prime Minister; Minister for National Education; Minister for the Arts and Science; Minister for Religion, Population, and the Family; Minister for the Interior
Joseph Bech		CSV	Minister for Foreign Affairs and Foreign Trade; Minister for Viticulture
Victor Bodson		LSAP	Minister for Justice; Minister for Public Works; Minister for Transport
Nicolas Biever		LSAP	Minister for Work, Social Security, Mines, and Social Assistance
Pierre Werner		CSV	Minister for Finances; Minister for the Armed Forces
Émile Colling		CSV	Minister for Agriculture; Minister for Public Health
Paul Wilwertz		LSAP	Minister for Economic Affairs
Henry Cravatte		LSAP	Secretary of State for Economic Affairs

== Formation ==
When in January 1958, the Minister of Economic Affairs, Michel Rasquin, left the government and became a member of the Commission of the EEC, Joseph Bech wanted to profit from the ministerial reshuffle by giving himself a Secretary of State for Foreign Affairs to assist him. However, the LSAP, the coalition partner, opposed this idea. Bech also requested that the Grand Duchess allow him to resign as Prime Minister, as he found he could no longer fulfil this role efficiently while still carrying out his international responsibilities. Pierre Frieden, the longest-serving CSV minister, replaced him as head of government.

== Policy ==
A year before the election, the Frieden government had a limited margin for manoeuvre. Various pressure groups presented their demands to the government, especially the Farmers' Central and trade unions.

The Frieden government continued the policy of the preceding government, putting more emphasis on reforms in education and culture.

The law of 7 July 1958 introduced a new training regime for teachers. Their secondary studies would be complemented by two years at the "Institut pédagogique". The law of 3 August 1958 created the "Institut d'enseignement technique". The law of 5 December 1958 gave a legal status to the National Library and the State Archives. Other reforms, such as those of the state museums and professional education, could not be completed due to the premature death of the Prime Minister. The continual growth of the number of pupils required the construction of new school buildings. In 1958, construction was started for a new school campus on Boulevard Pierre Dupong, of which the first completed building was that of the new Athénée.

The government also pursued the modernisation of the country's infrastructure. On 10 July 1958, it signed an agreement with the German Land Rhineland-Palatinate on the development of a pumping station on the Our, near Vianden. To achieve this, a private company with some investment by the Luxembourgish state had been created in 1951, the Société électrique de l’Our (SEO). The signing of the agreement allowed construction to start on the hydroelectric plant. The pumping station started working in 1963.
