= Bech-Bodson Government =

Coalition government of Luxembourg from 1953 to 1958

- Cabinet of Luxembourg
- 1953-1958
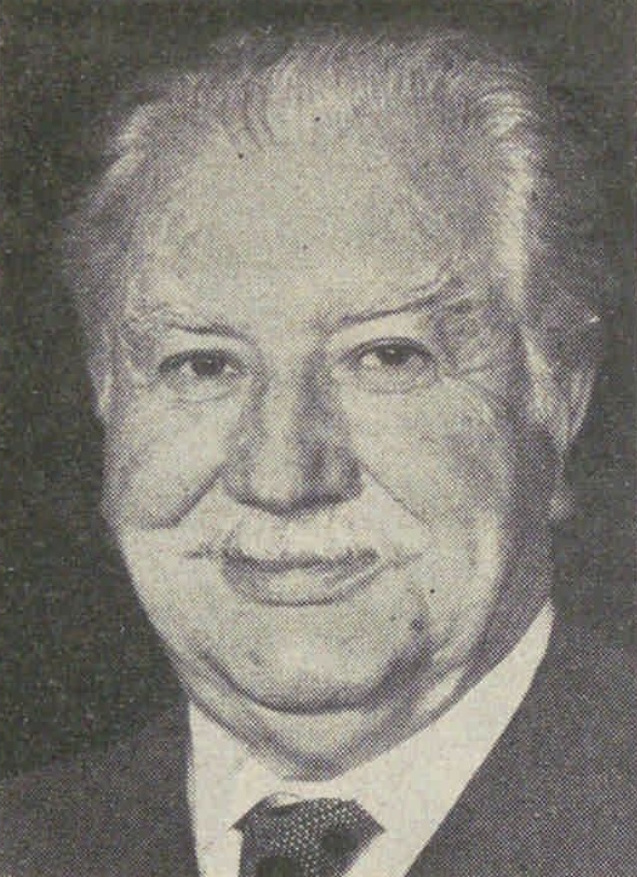
- Date formed: 29 December 1953
- Date dissolved: 29 March 1958 (4 years and 3 months)

People and organisations
- Grand Duchess: Charlotte
- Prime Minister: Joseph Bech
- Deputy Prime Minister: Victor Bodson
- Total no. of members: 6 (1953-1954; 1958); 7 (1954-1958)
- Member parties: CSV; LSAP
- Status in legislature: Centre-left to centre-right coalition government
- Opposition parties: DP (Note: Known as the Patriotic and Democratic Grouping (GPD) until 1955.); KPL

History
- Elections: 1951 general election 1954 general election
- Legislature term: 21st Legislature of the Chamber of Deputies
- Predecessor: Dupong-Bodson Government
- Successor: Frieden Government

The Bech-Bodson Government was the government of Luxembourg between 29 December 1953 and 29 March 1958. It was a coalition between the Christian Social People's Party (CSV), and the Luxembourg Socialist Workers' Party (LSAP).

== Formation ==
The CSV was taken by surprise by the unexpected death of Pierre Dupong on 23 December 1953. Dupong had chosen a preferred successor for himself: Pierre Werner, who joined the government as Minister for Finances and the Armed Forces. Joseph Bech, who had the longest government experience, became Prime Minister, while also taking over the ministries of Foreign Affairs and Agriculture. At the general election of 30 May 1954, the CSV achieved a spectacular victory. It obtained 26 seats out of 52 and, for the second time since 1945, came close to an absolute majority. The new coalition between the CSV and the LSAP took the new power relations into account, by giving the CSV a fourth ministerial post. Émile Colling became the Minister for Agriculture and for Health. At the Ministry for Economic Affairs, Michel Rasquin was now assisted by a commissioner-general in Paul Wilwertz. By decree of 31 December 1957, the latter received the title of secretary of state. Rasquin was criticised within the party for his economic policy that was seen as too liberal, and left the government on 20 January 1958 to become a member of the Commission of the European Economic Community in Brussels. His secretary of state became a minister, until a more wide-reaching reshuffle of the government in March of the same year.

== Foreign policy ==
The foreign policy of Luxembourg in the 1950s was dominated by the question of European construction. European unification represented an existential challenge for a country as small as Luxembourg. Joseph Bech, the master of Luxembourgish diplomacy, quoted a saying to justify his government's reserves with regards to the abandoning of sovereignty that the European cause required: "While a fat man grows thin, a thin man dies."

The French National Assembly's refusal on 30 August 1954 to ratify the treaty establishing the European Defence Community, seemed initially to block the process of integration. However, the danger that after the failure of the EDC, France and Germany would lead their own policy caused the Benelux countries to retake the initiative in the European project. At the Messina Conference (1–3 June 1955) they submitted a memorandum in which they proposed a common market. Luxembourg played only a minor role in the Messina initiative. Bech was worried about the extension of supranationality, and was wary of the prospect of totally free circulation of goods and persons. The memorandum was mostly the work of his Belgian and Dutch colleagues, Paul-Henri Spaak and Johan Willem Beyen. At the negotiations of Val-Duchesse, which prepared the path for the Treaty of Rome, the Luxembourgish government sent a small delegation led by the former minister Lambert Schaus.

Luxembourg found itself in a vulnerable position. It brought little to a common market of 150 million people, as its main industry, the steel industry, was already integrated in the European Coal and Steel Community. Its small population and the backwardness of its farming industry led it to demand special treatment which provoked the irritation of other countries. Luxembourg feared that in a common market, Luxembourgish agriculture, which had benefited from protectionist measures since the Zollverein, would be devastated by foreign competition. In addition, the free circulation of people inside the European Community risked increasing in an uncontrolled manner the number of foreigners in Luxembourg, who already constituted 11% of the population and 27% of the workforce in 1956. Luxembourg finally obtained two exception clauses in an annex to the treaty of the common market. The first stipulated that during a transition period of 12 to 15 years, the Grand Duchy could limit the import of certain agricultural products. Nevertheless, the Luxembourgish government had to pledge to take “all structural, technical and economic measures to enable the progressive integration of Luxembourgish agriculture in the common market”. The other clause required that the regulations of the Commission concerning free circulation of workers take account of the “particular demographic situation” of Luxembourg.

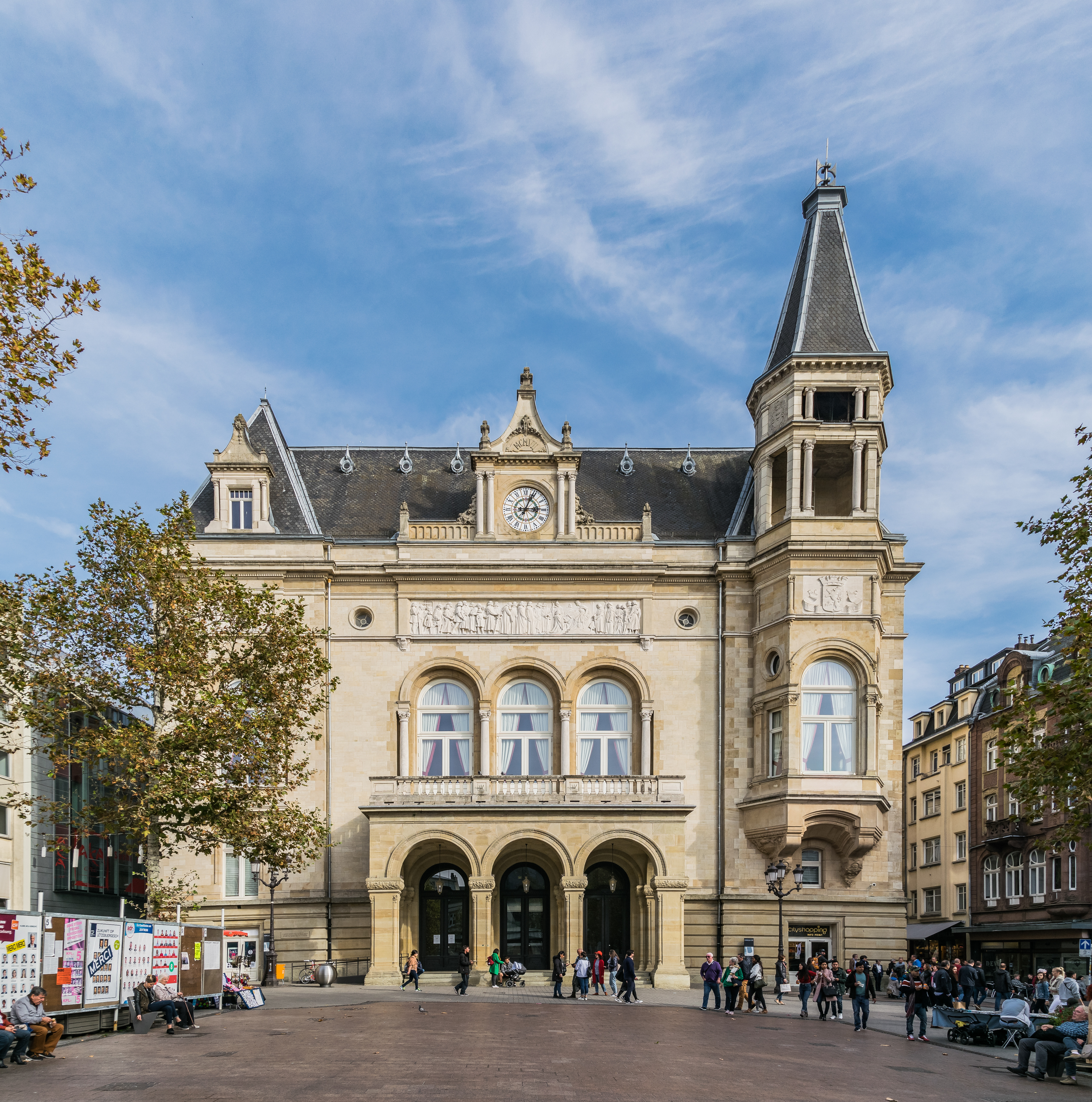
The Cercle Municipal, the seat of the Council of Ministers when in Luxembourg

In terms of the political organisation of the EEC, the Luxembourgish government had constantly opposed a representation of Luxembourg by Belgium (in conformance with the treaty of the Belgium–Luxembourg Economic Union of 1921) and insisted that Luxembourg join the common market as a sovereign state. It finally received what it wanted: it would be fully represented in the Commission. Of the nine seats in the Commission, one seat was allocated to Luxembourg. The Luxembourgish negotiators were convinced that the interests of the Grand Duchy as a sovereign state were best protected by the Council of Ministers. In these meetings of six, Luxembourg was more likely to get its voice heard. They also argued for a reinforcement of the powers of the Council of Ministers at the expense of the supranational organs. Luxembourg had only received its recognition as a sovereign state, as a full member of the international community, in the course of the Second World War and at the cost of heavy sacrifice. This explains the government's reluctance to renounce a part of its national prerogatives.

The signature of the Treaty of Rome in March 1957 also raised the question of the headquarters of the new Communities. The attitude of the Luxembourgish government may be surprising today. It did not immediately demand that all common market and Euratom institutions be located in Luxembourg, and only suggested its capital as a last resort. Instead, it argued for the solution of a split headquarters, which would put the organs of the ECSC in Luxembourg and gave Brussels the new institutions. The government had probably given way to the influence of certain groups who feared the country would be overrun by the European bureaucracy and would lose its identity. It is not clear if it missed a historic opportunity, since in opting for decentralisation, it was better able to defend its status as the location of the ECSC in the face of Brussels's and Strasbourg's candidacies, while obtaining compensation for the loss of parts that were integrated in the new common market.

== Domestic policy ==
=== Electoral system ===
The domestic policy of the 1950s was concerned with modernisation. An important innovation in the political sphere was the abandonment of the system of re-electing half of the Chamber every three years, and the introduction of general elections every five years. The system of partial elections, in only two of the four constituencies – one urban or industrial, the other rural – had been designed to avoid sudden political changes. On 30 May 1954, general elections were held in the four constituencies after the Deputies had declared a number of articles of the Constitution subject to revision. The constitutional revisions of 27 July, 25 October and 2 November 1956 uniformly changed the term of office of Deputies to five years, and added Article 49, which allowed the transfer of sovereignty to international institutions.

=== Social policy ===
In the area of social policy, the main issue was the progressive extension of social security to all socio-professional groups, and especially to farmers and the self-employed. The social achievements gained by the workers in the 1920s and 1930s were used as a model. The law of 3 September 1956 on the Fund for Farmers' Pensions guaranteed a pension for farmers. The law of 29 July 1957 extended compulsory health insurance to craftworkers, shopkeepers and manufacturers. The questions of the length of the working day, overtime payment, and wages, created numerous tensions between employers and workers. In 1955, a miners' strike paralysed the entire sector. Work only resumed a week later, thanks to mediation by the Minister for Work, Nicolas Biever.

=== Purges ===
The Bech-Bodson government also closed the chapter of purges. In 1954, a thousand cases of collaborators were still pending before Luxembourgish courts. The government was keen to pacify feelings and re-establish national unity, and restarted discussions about an amnesty plan from April 1954. The law of 12 January 1955 wiped the slate clean on actions against the external security of the State committed by Luxembourgers, and instituted clemency measures relative to administrative purges.

=== Infrastructure ===
In the immediate post-war period, the work of reconstruction had allowed the state to develop powerful means of intervention in the national economy. Once reconstruction had finished, the government did not stop its interventionist practices. A vast programme of infrastructural modernisation took over the reins from the reconstruction efforts. Two sectors were the object of considerable public investments: energy and transport. In 1955, reconstruction work started on the Esch-sur-Sûre Dam, which was at the same time a hydroelectric power plant and a water reservoir. The turbines produced electricity from 1960. Around the same time, a hydroelectric plant was built on the lower Sauer in Rosport (1957-1960). In parallel to the energy supply, the government took action to improve transport infrastructure. The canalisation of the Moselle, agreed in 1956 by the three riverine countries, and the port installations in Mertert gave the steel industry access to maritime ports. The electrification of the rail network from 1956 was also motivated by the desire to reduce transport costs and facilitate the export of steel products. In this point, Luxembourgish and French interests were aligned. France delivered 20 electric locomotives to Luxembourg in return for the construction of the canal of the Moselle, which required substantial investments by Luxembourg, but which mostly benefited the steel industry of Lorraine. The government additionally expanded the road network, and enlarged the airport.

The aid received in the framework of the Marshall Plan allowed Luxembourg to finance the modernisation of its infrastructure. Later, however, it was the Luxembourgish state which financed these large-scale projects, its income boosted by the positive economic situation. The government invested the dividends of growth in modernisation.

== Ministers ==
=== 29 December 1953 – 29 June 1954 ===
Name	Party	Office
Joseph Bech	CSV	Prime Minister; Minister for Foreign Affairs and Foreign Trade; Minister for Agriculture and Viticulture
Pierre Frieden	CSV	Minister for National Education; Minister for Population and the Family; Minister for the Interior; Minister for Public Health; Minister for Religion, the Arts, and Science
Victor Bodson	LSAP	Minister for Justice; Minister for Public Works; Minister for Transport
Nicolas Biever	LSAP	Minister for Work, Social Security, Mines, and Social Assistance
Michel Rasquin	LSAP	Minister for Economic Affairs and Reconstruction
Pierre Werner	CSV	Minister for Finances; Minister for the Armed Forces

=== 29 June 1954 – 20 January 1958 ===
Name	Party	Office
Joseph Bech	CSV	Prime Minister; Minister for Foreign Affairs and Foreign Trade; Minister for Viticulture
Pierre Frieden	CSV	Minister for National Education; Minister for Population and the Family; Minister for the Interior; Minister for Public Health; Minister for Religion, the Arts, and Science
Victor Bodson	LSAP	Minister for Justice; Minister for Public Works; Minister for Transport
Nicolas Biever	LSAP	Minister for Work, Social Security, Mines, and Social Assistance
Michel Rasquin	LSAP	Minister for Economic Affairs
Pierre Werner	CSV	Minister for Finances; Minister for the Armed Forces
Paul Wilwertz	LSAP	Secretary of State for Economic Affairs

=== 20 January 1958 – 29 March 1958 ===
Name	Portrait	Party	Office
Joseph Bech		CSV	Prime Minister; Minister for Foreign Affairs and Foreign Trade; Minister for Viticulture
Pierre Frieden		CSV	Minister for National Education; Minister for Population and the Family; Minister for the Interior; Minister for Public Health; Minister for Religion, the Arts, and Science
Victor Bodson		LSAP	Minister for Justice; Minister for Public Works; Minister for Transport
Nicolas Biever		LSAP	Minister for Work, Social Security, Mines, and Social Assistance
Pierre Werner		CSV	Minister for Finances; Minister for the Armed Forces
Paul Wilwertz		LSAP	Minister for Economic Affairs
Source: Service Information et Presse

== Notes and references ==
=== Works cited ===
- Thewes, Guy (2011). Les gouvernements du Grand-Duché de Luxembourg depuis 1848 (PDF) (in French). Service Information et Presse. ISBN 978-2-87999-212-9.
