= Dupong-Krier Ministry =

Government of Luxembourg, 1937–1940

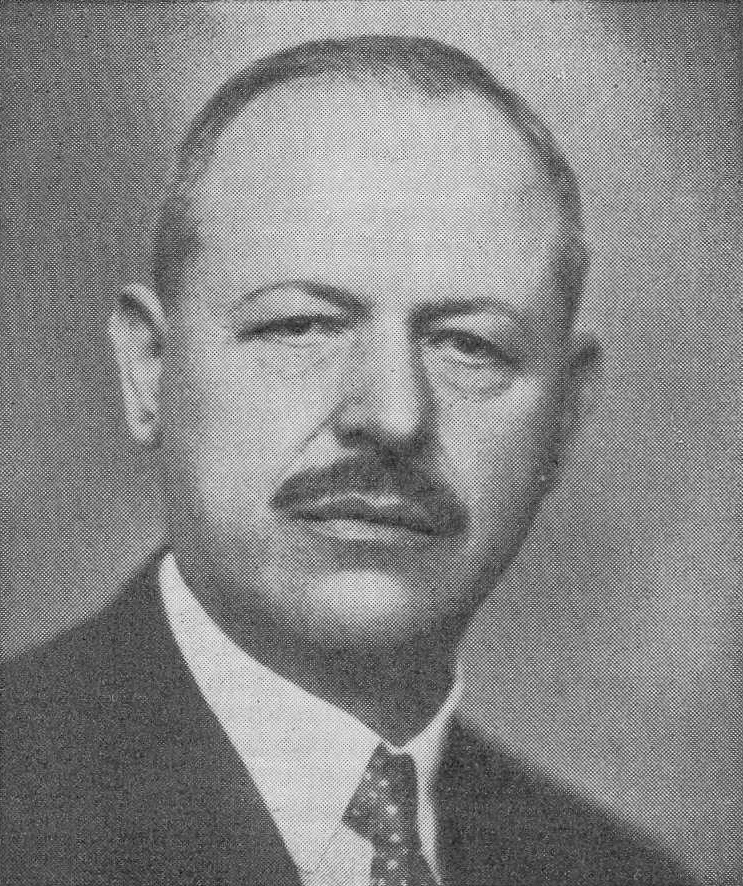
Pierre Dupong, prime minister

The Dupong-Krier Ministry took office in Luxembourg on 5 November 1937 after the resignation of the prime minister Joseph Bech, due to the result of a referendum on the so-called Maulkuerfgesetz ("muzzle law").

It was a large coalition government between the Party of the Right and the Luxembourg Workers' Party. Initially, the Liberals also participated, but Étienne Schmit died on 19 December 1937. There was then a reshuffle on 7 February 1938. There was a further reshuffle on 6 April 1940 when Victor Bodson took over the portfolio of René Blum.

During the German invasion of Luxembourg on 10 May 1940, all members of the government apart from Nicolas Margue managed to make it over the border and into exile.

== Formation ==
After the rejection in the referendum on the Maulkuerfgesetz, Joseph Bech presented his resignation to Grand Duchess Charlotte. However, she initially refused to accept it. In the face of an international situation that was growing more and more menacing, the idea gained ground that a coalition of the three main parties should be formed. But the socialists refused to join a government of which Bech would be a member. The Catholics responded with a similar condition with regards to René Blum, a figure in the Workers' Party. Five months of long negotiations were necessary before Pierre Dupong succeeded in forming a new government coalition, which was almost a national union government. Bech remained in the government, holding on to the Foreign Affairs portfolio. Dupong became head of government. Two socialists joined the government: Pierre Krier, a trade unionist, and René Blum, a lawyer. The liberals were represented in the cabinet by Étienne Schmit. After the latter's death on 19 December 1937, they found no successor who was acceptable to the other parties, and officially withdrew from the coalition on 11 July 1939. For personal reasons, the Workers' Party replaced René Blum with Victor Bodson in April 1940, only a few weeks before the German invasion and the government's departure into exile.

== Foreign policy ==
The remilitarisation of the Rhineland, from 1936, reduced the safety buffer between France and Germany to the small territory of Luxembourg. The presence of foreign troops in the Grand Duchy in case of a Franco-German war once again became a probability. The other Western neighbour of Germany, Belgium, reacted by pulling out from the military agreement with France, and by adopting a "policy of free hands". The Luxembourgish government also sought safety in a policy of neutrality. To consolidate the international position of Luxembourg, the Minister of Foreign Affairs, Joseph Bech, imagined a diplomatic operation: the signatory states to the Treaty of London of 1867 were to reaffirm the perpetual neutrality of Luxembourg by a common declaration. However, Belgium and the United Kingdom equivocated. In the absence of a multilateral agreement, Bech tried to obtain a simultaneous undertaking from France and Germany. While Germany had no problem in expressing towards Luxembourg all the promises that had been requested, France hesitated to commit itself. The French headquarters wanted to retain a right of passage across the Grand Duchy in case of German aggression. Thus, in spring 1939, with the spectre of war hovering over Europe, the government did not succeed in obtaining any formal guarantees. A surprise invasion without a reaction from the other powers became probable.

== Domestic policy ==
In the face of the international threat, the Chamber granted the government an extension of its power in order to allow it to take measures necessary to safeguard the interests of the state. Thus, on the basis of the laws of 28 September 1938 and of 29 August 1939, the government took a series of measures: a new declaration of neutrality, a ban on providing aid to the belligerent parties, increased monitoring of the borders, a ban on hunting in border areas, measures to save fuel and electricity, the creation of stocks of food and fuel, and monitoring of radio broadcasts and the press.

In this context, the commemoration of the centenary of independence, in which the whole of Luxembourgish society participated, became a reaction against the German threat. In 1939, the government skilfully used the commemoration festivities to demonstrate to European public opinion the country's desire for independence. The commemoration succeeded in reconciling Luxembourgish society after it had been divided by the referendum of 1937, and reinforced national sentiments in the face of the external threat.

== Composition ==
=== 5 November 1937 to 7 February 1938 ===
| Name | Party | Office |
|---|---|---|
| Pierre Dupong | PD | Prime Minister; Minister for Finances; Minister for the Army |
| Joseph Bech | PD | Minister for Foreign Affairs; Minister for Viticulture; Minister for Arts and Sciences |
| Étienne Schmit (died 19 December 1937) | PRL | Minister for the Interior; Minister for Commerce; Minister for Industry and Trades; Minister for Transport and Electricity |
| Nicolas Margue | PD | Minister for Education; Minister for Agriculture and Religion |
| Pierre Krier | POS | Minister for Social Security and Work; Minister for Mines |
| René Blum | POS | Minister for Justice; Minister for Public Works |

=== 7 February 1938 to 6 April 1940 ===
| Name | Party | Office |
|---|---|---|
| Pierre Dupong | PD | Prime Minister; Minister for Finances; Minister for the Army |
| Joseph Bech | PD | Minister for Foreign Affairs; Minister for Viticulture; Minister for Arts and Sciences; Minister for the Interior (acting) |
| Nicolas Margue | PD | Minister for Education; Minister for Agriculture and Religion; Minister for Commerce (acting); Minister for Industry and Trades (acting) |
| Pierre Krier | POS | Minister for Social Security and Work; Minister for Mines |
| René Blum | POS | Minister for Justice; Minister for Public Works; Minister for Transport and Electricity (acting) |

=== 6 April 1940 to 10 May 1940 ===
| Name | Party | Office |
|---|---|---|
| Pierre Dupong | PD | Prime Minister; Minister for Finances; Minister for the Army |
| Joseph Bech | PD | Minister for Foreign Affairs; Minister for Viticulture; Minister for Arts and Sciences; Minister for the Interior (acting) |
| Nicolas Margue | PD | Minister for Education; Minister for Agriculture and Religion; Minister for Commerce (acting); Minister for Industry and Trades (acting) |
| Pierre Krier | POS | Minister for Social Security and Work; Minister for Mines |
| Victor Bodson | POS | Minister for Justice; Minister for Public Works; Minister for Transport and Electricity |

== References and further reading ==
- Hoffmann, Serge (2002). "Les relations germano-luxembourgeoises durant les années 30" (PDF). Ons Stad (in French) (71). Archived from the original (PDF) on 13 September 2016.
- Thewes, Guy (2011). Les gouvernements du Grand-Duché de Luxembourg depuis 1848 (PDF) (in French). Service Information et Presse. pp. 104–109. ISBN 978-2-87999-212-9. Archived from the original (PDF) on 2017-01-11.
