= Dupong-Bodson Government =

1951–1953 government of Luxembourg

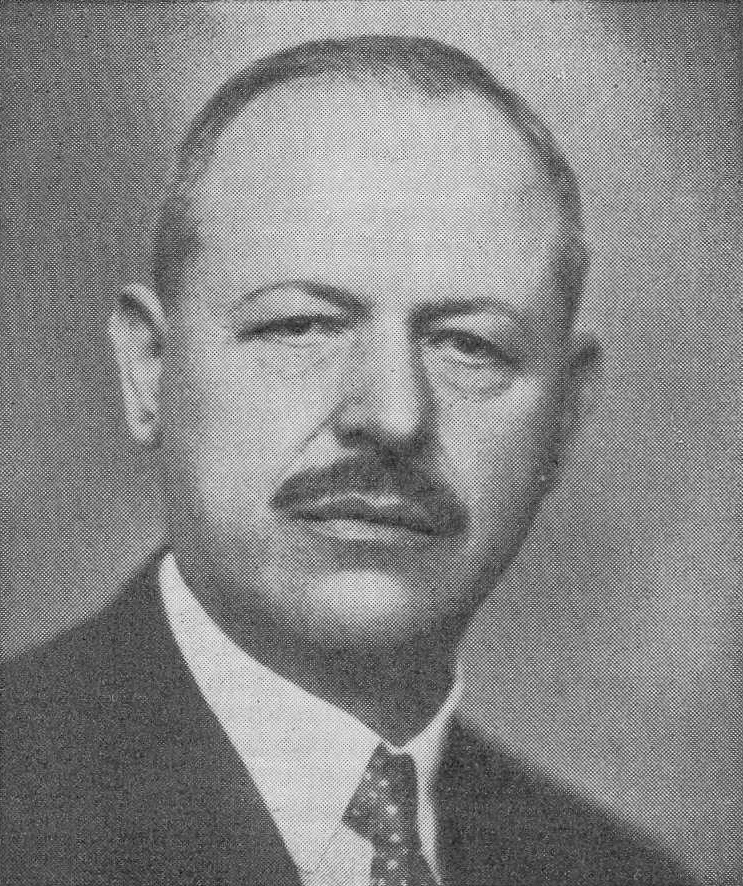
Pierre Dupong, prime minister

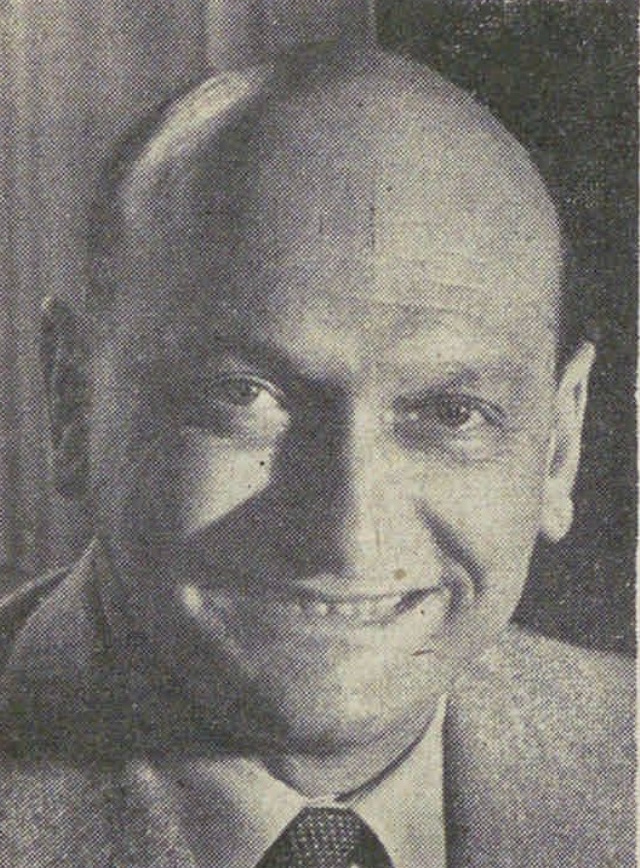
Victor Bodson, deputy prime minister

The Dupong-Bodson Government was the government of Luxembourg between 3 July 1951 and 23 December 1953. It was a coalition between the Christian Social People's Party (CSV), and the Luxembourg Socialist Workers' Party (LSAP). It was formed after the general election of 1951.

== Formation ==
In the partial elections of 3 June 1951, in the constituencies of Centre and Nord, the LSAP consolidated the positive results it had achieved in the election of 1948. In the new Chamber of Deputies, it had grown from 15 to 19 seats, becoming the main competing force for the CSV (21 seats). The Democratic Group lost a large number of votes in the Centre (19,7% in 1951, down from 25,9% in 1945), even though it managed to improve its result in Nord. The result of the elections led the CSV to change its coalition partner. From 1951 to 1959, the government was formed by a coalition between the CSV and the LSAP. These two political groups, which dominated political life for a decade, represented the two main areas of Luxembourgish society in the 1950s: the rural world and the workers' world.

== Foreign policy ==
After the signature of the Treaty of Paris on 18 April 1951, creating the European Coal and Steel Community, the question of the location of the new institution arose. From 23 to 25 July 1952, the foreign ministers of the six member states met in Paris to find a solution. Several cities including Luxembourg advanced their candidature, with none of them receiving unanimous support. The High Authority and the Court of Justice were in danger of not being able to start their work, due to not having a headquarters. During this impasse, the Luxembourgish Minister of Foreign Affairs, Joseph Bech, probably inspired by Konrad Adenauer, undertook a diplomatic manoeuvre that determined the European future of the Grand Duchy. Bech withdrew the candidacy of Luxembourg, and then suggested the country's capital as a provisional place of work. The other countries accepted this solution, which postponed the decision over the definitive headquarters of the European institutions to an undefined future date. On 10 August 1952, the High Authority had its first meeting in the city hall in Luxembourg, presided by Jean Monnet.

At the same time as Luxembourg was integrating itself in the ECSC, the government was confronted with another European project, that of the European Defence Community (EDC) which was to provide a framework for Germany's rearmament. In the course of the negotiations, the government succeeded in gaining full representation for Luxembourg: one of the nine commissioners in the EDC would be Luxembourgish. However, the country's small population did not allow it to fulfil its military obligations. Again, the government managed to obtain special treatment for the case of Luxembourg. On 27 May 1952, the treaty establishing the EDC was signed in Paris. The treaty was never to come into effect, as the French National Assembly refused to ratify the EDC in 1954.

== Domestic policy ==
Since the introduction of obligatory military service in 1944, the Luxembourg Army had been much criticised for its lack of military value, and high financial cost, for such a small country. The law of 23 July 1952 reorganised the Army, limiting the length of service to 12 months, with two recalls for three months each. It was intended to allow Luxembourg to fulfil its military obligations to the EDC.

After the elections of 1951, Pierre Dupong took over the Ministry of Agriculture in order to defuse the conflict between the Farmers' Central (Centrale paysanne) and the government. He largely followed the protectionist position promoted by the farmers' professional association.

Under the impulse of the CSV, the government gave the family a central role. When the government was formed, it created a Department of Population and Family, which was attached to the Ministry of Education. From 1952, a Superior Council of the Family assisted the minister in forming family policy.

Victor Bodson, who was in charge of Transport, started an ambitious programme to modernise the railways. This provided for a replacement of the narrow-gauge lines, and for a study on the electrification of the railway network.

The Dupong-Bodson government also laid important groundwork in the area of social security. Health insurance, which was already obligatory for manual workers, was extended to civil servants and employees (law of 29 August 1951). From 1951, the minimum wage and employees' and workers' pensions were indexed, that is, adapted to inflation.

== Ministers ==
Name	Portrait	Party	Office
Pierre Dupong		CSV	Prime Minister; Minister for Finances; Minister for Agriculture; Minister for War Damage
Joseph Bech		CSV	Minister for Foreign Affairs and Foreign Trade; Minister for the Armed Forces
Pierre Frieden		CSV	Minister for National Education; Minister for Population and the Family; Minister for the Interior; Minister for Public Health; Minister for Religion, the Arts, and Science
Victor Bodson		LSAP	Minister for Justice; Minister for Public Works; Minister for Transport
Nicolas Biever		LSAP	Minister for Work, Social Security, Mines, and Social Assistance
Michel Rasquin		LSAP	Minister for Economic Affairs and Reconstruction
