= François Altwies =

Luxembourgish politician

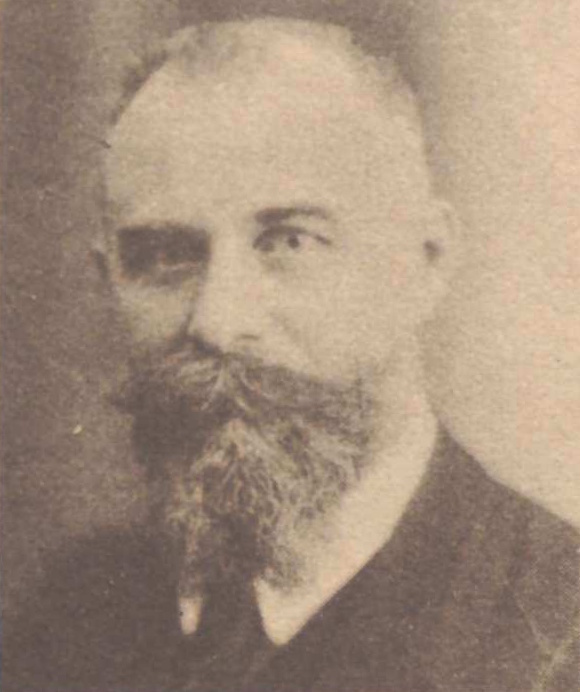
- Altwies c. 1925

President of the Chamber of Deputies
- In office 1917–1925
- Preceded by: Edouard Hemmer
- Succeeded by: René Blum

Member of the Chamber of Deputies
- In office 1911–1919
- Constituency: Grevenmacher

Member of the Chamber of Deputies
- In office 1919–1933
- Constituency: Centre

Personal details
- Born: 11 November 1869 Remich
- Died: 5 July 1936 (aged 66) Luxembourg City
- Party: Party of the Right
- Spouse: Elise Wurth (m. 1901)
- Occupation: Civil law notary

François Altwies (11 November 1869 – 5 July 1936) was a Luxembourgish politician. He sat in the Chamber of Deputies, of which he served as President from 1917 until 1925.

Altwies was a lawyer by profession, and was appointed notary in Junglinster in 1897, before holding that office in Luxembourg City from 1922. He was first elected to the Chamber in 1911, representing the canton of Grevenmacher. A conservative, Altwies joined the Party of the Right (PD) upon its formation in 1914. He was reelected in 1915 and 1918.

An eloquent and prominent member, Altwies became, along with Emile Prüm, Joseph Bech, and Auguste Thorn, one of the PD's main weapons on the floor of the Chamber. He became vice-president of the chamber on 28 June 1917 when Léon Kauffman, a fellow PD member, became prime minister. Only four months later, he was elevated to president, in which capacity he remained until 1925, when the Party of the Right lost their overall majority in the chamber (the only spell in the era of proportional representation in which any party has held it).

Altwies played a key role in putting down the attempted communist revolution led by Émile Servais in January 1919, calling upon French soldiers to intervene in the crisis. When proportional representation was introduced, in 1919, he moved to representing Centre, for which he was returned again in 1925 and 1931. He was appointed a Councillor of State in 1933. He died on 5 July 1936 in Luxembourg City.

He married Elise Wurth (1879–1966) on 21 May 1901. They lived together on the maison de maître of Luxembourg City's prestigious Boulevard Royal.

== Decorations ==
Altwies was awarded the following national decorations:

- Belgium: Order of the Crown of Belgium (Grand Cross)
- France: Legion of Honour (Commander)
- Italy: Order of the Crown of Italy (Grand Cross)
- Luxembourg
  - Order of Adolphe of Nassau (Grand Officer)
  - Order of the Oak Crown (Grand Officer)

== Footnotes ==
Political offices
Preceded by Edouard Hemmer	President of the Chamber of Deputies; 1917–1925	Succeeded by René Blum
