= 1954 Luxembourg general election =

- 30 May 1954
- All 52 seats in the Chamber of Deputies; 27 seats needed for a majority
Party	Leader	Vote %	Seats	+/–
CSV	Joseph Bech	42.36	26	+5
LSAP	Victor Bodson	35.12	17	−2
GD	Eugène Schaus	10.79	6	−2
KPL	Dominique Urbany	8.92	3	−1
This lists parties that won seats. See the complete results below.
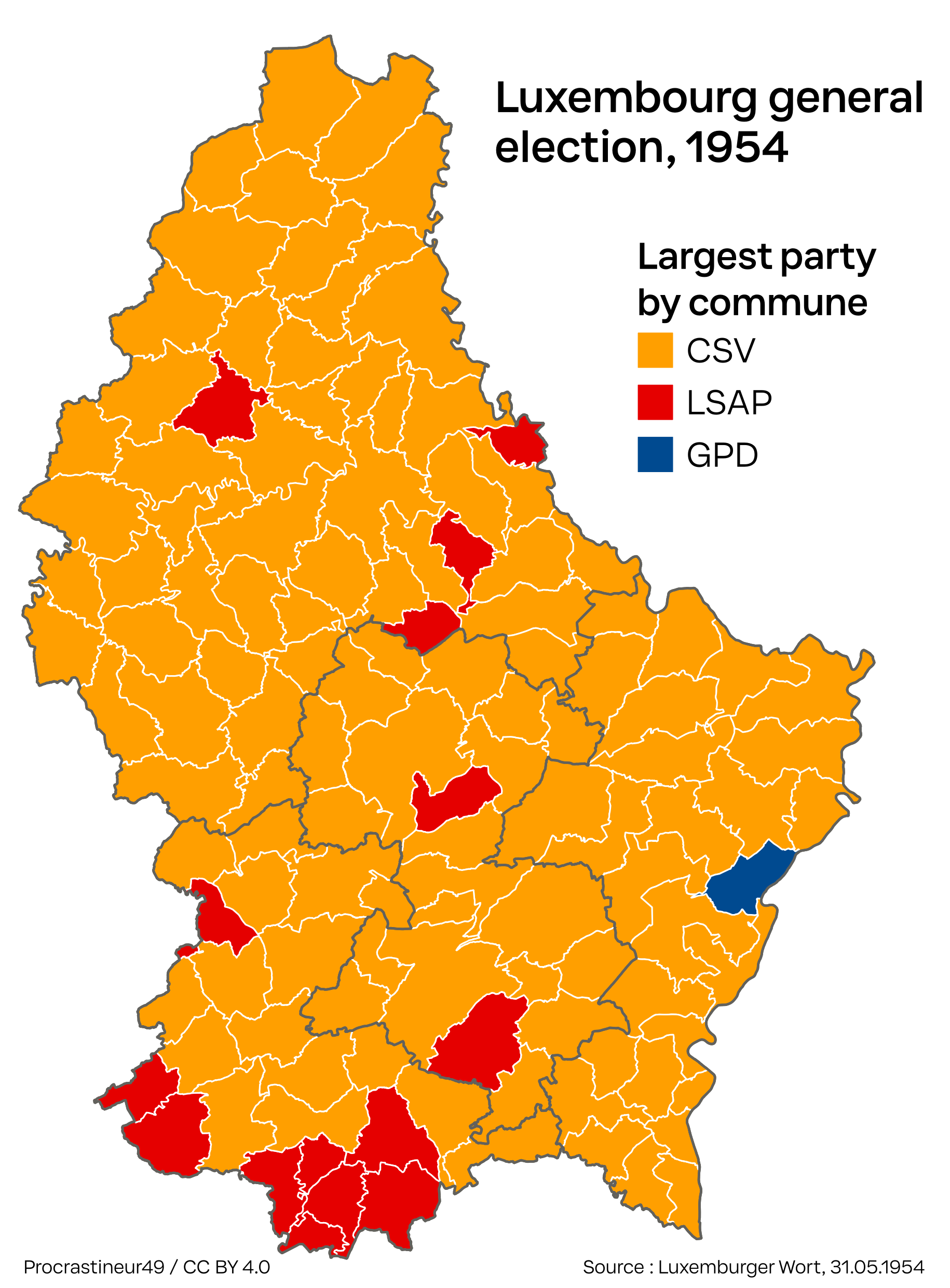
Results by commune
Prime Minister before	Prime Minister after
Joseph Bech; CSV	Joseph Bech; CSV

General elections were held in Luxembourg on 30 May 1954. The Christian Social People's Party won 26 of the 52 seats in the Chamber of Deputies.

The elections were the general elections held after the Bech-Bodson government changed the electoral system. Previously, partial elections were held every three years in which half the seats in the Chamber were elected, with deputies serving six-year terms. The changes reduced deputies' terms to five years, with all seats elected at the same time.

The government, a coalition of the Christian Social People's Party (CSV), and the Luxembourg Socialist Workers' Party, remained in power following the elections.

== Results ==
Party	Votes	%	Seats	+/–
Christian Social People's Party	1,003,406	42.36	26	+5
Luxembourg Socialist Workers' Party	831,836	35.12	17	–2
Democratic Group	255,522	10.79	6	–2
Communist Party of Luxembourg	211,171	8.92	3	–1
Independent Party of the Middle Class	66,582	2.81	0	New
Total	2,368,517	100.00	52	0
Valid votes	162,063	95.28		
Invalid/blank votes	8,029	4.72		
Total votes	170,092	100.00		
Registered voters/turnout	183,590	92.65		
Source: Nohlen & Stöver
