= Étienne Schmit =

Luxembourgish politician and jurist

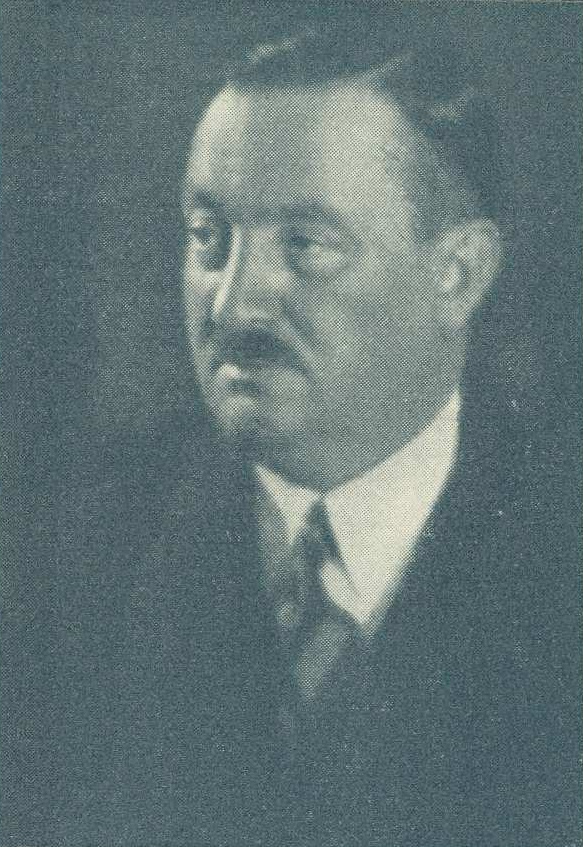
Schmit c. 1935

Étienne Schmit (22 October 1889 – 19 December 1937) was a Luxembourgish politician and jurist.

== Biography ==
Schmit was born in Rambrouch, Luxembourg on October 22, 1886. Schmit studied law and became a lawyer and a Justice of the Peace.

Schmit served in the Chamber of Deputies in the Government of Pierre Prüm, as Director-General of Finance and Public Instruction, from 1925–1926.

He sat in the communal council of Luxembourg City from 1929–1931. He was also, for a time, the President of the Commercial Court.

Schmit served again in the Chamber of Deputies in the governments of Joseph Bech (1932–1937), and Pierre Dupong (1937). In 1932, he became the Director General of Public Works, Commerce, and Industry and later Director General of Public Works and Justice.

In 1937, he became Minister for the Interior. Schmit died in office later that year. The same year, his daughter, Yvonne, a pioneer dentist, married the sculptor, Lucien Wercollier.

Political offices
Preceded by Alphonse Neyens	Director-General for Finances; 1925–1926	Succeeded by Pierre Dupong
Preceded by Albert Clemang	Minister for Public Works; 1932–1937	Succeeded by René Blum
Preceded by Norbert Dumont	Minister for Justice; 1936–1937	Succeeded by René Blum
New title Ministry created	Minister for Transport; 1937	Succeeded by René Blum
