= Émile Colling =

Luxembourgian doctor and politician (1899–1981)

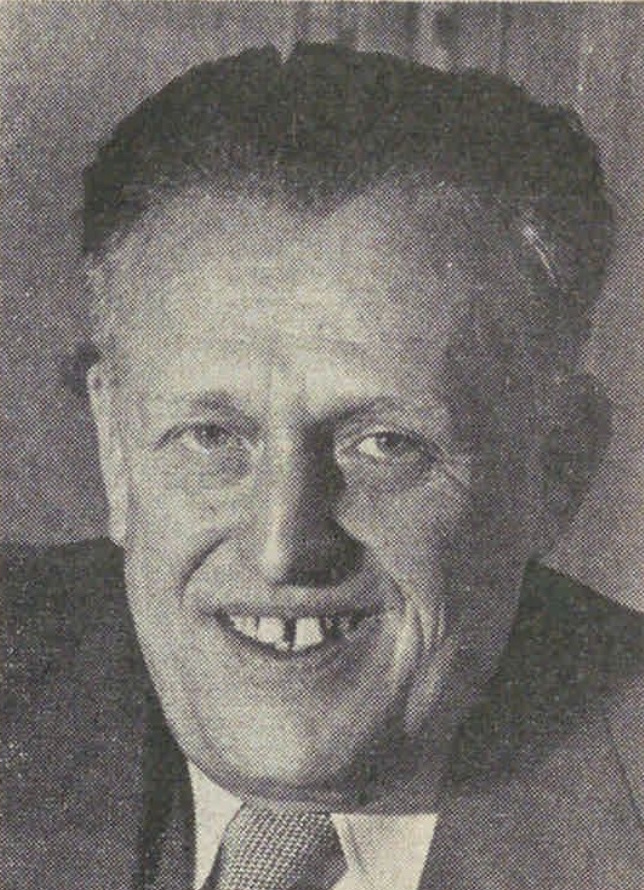
Colling c. 1954

Émile Colling (12 April 1899 – 16 September 1981) was a Luxembourgish medical doctor and politician.

== Life ==
Colling was born in Clervaux, as the youngest of 6 children. After attending the Athénée de Luxembourg, he studied medicine in Strasbourg, Nancy, Freiburg, and Cologne. In 1925, he settled in Esch-sur-Alzette as a doctor. In 1945 he was made the first director of public health. In the same year, he became manager of the spa in Mondorf and a member of the Consultative Assembly. Politically, he was aligned with the newly founded conservative Christian Social People's Party. In 1945, he was elected to the city council of Esch, and also to the Chamber of Deputies for the South district. He was re-elected as a Deputy in 1948 and 1954. In 1954 he became Minister for Agriculture and Public Health in the Bech-Bodson Ministry. He remained in this post from 1958 to 1959 in the Frieden Ministry. Then he became Minister for Labour and Social Security in Pierre Werner's government, until 1964, and thereafter the Minister for Agriculture, Wine-growing, Families, Population and Social Security. In 1967 he became the Luxembourgish ambassador to the Holy See, which he remained until 1974.

He had five children, including François Colling.

== Publications ==
- Den Dokter vun der Grenz. E Stéck Escher Chronik vum Emil Colling, 1899 - 1981. (2005). ISBN 2-9599671-0-0
- De Fuuss am Krich. Eng lëschteg Reimerei iwwer eng eescht Geschicht (1978).
