= List of prime ministers of Luxembourg =

Prime Minister of Principality of Luxembourg
- Luxembourgish: Premierminister vu Lëtzebuerg; French: Premier ministre luxembourgeois German: Premierminister von Luxemburg
- Lesser coat of arms of Luxembourg

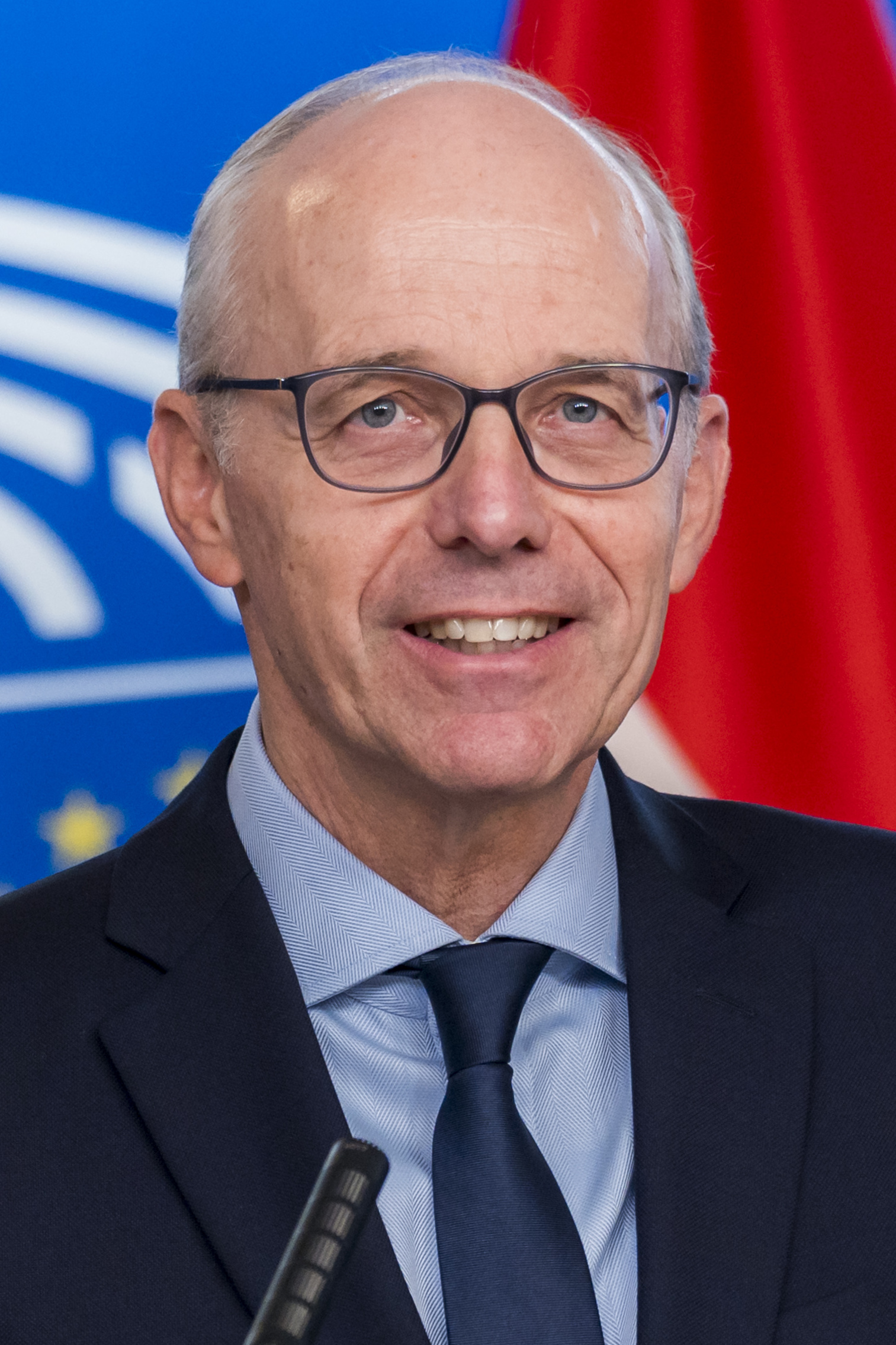
- Incumbent; Luc Frieden since 17 November 2023
- Executive branch of the Grand Duchy of Luxembourg
- Style: Mr. Prime Minister (informal); The Honourable (formal); His Excellency (diplomatic)
- Status: Head of government
- Member of: Council of Government; European Council
- Reports to: Monarch • Parliament
- Residence: Hôtel Saint-Maximin
- Seat: Luxembourg City
- Appointer: Grand Duke of Luxembourg
- Term length: No fixed term
- Constituting instrument: Constitution of the Grand Duchy of Luxembourg
- Formation: 1 August 1848; 178 years ago
- First holder: Gaspard-Théodore-Ignace de la Fontaine
- Unofficial names: Minister of State "Premier"
- Deputy: Deputy Prime Minister
- Salary: €262,548 annually
- Website: gouvernement.lu

The prime minister of Luxembourg (Luxembourgish: Premierminister vu Lëtzebuerg; French: Premier ministre luxembourgeois; German: Premierminister von Luxemburg) is the head of government of Luxembourg. The prime minister leads the executive branch, chairs the Council of Government and appoints its ministers.

Since 1989, the title of Prime Minister has been an official one, although the head of the government had been unofficially known by that name for some time. Between 1857 and 1989, the prime minister was styled the President of the Government, with the exception of the 25-day premiership of Mathias Mongenast. Before 1857, the prime minister was the President of the Council. In addition to these titles, the prime minister uses the title Minister of State, although this is usually relegated to a secondary title.

This is a list of prime ministers and governments since the post was founded, in 1848. In larger font are the dates of the prime ministers entering and leaving office. The smaller dates, during the respective premierships, are those of the prime ministers' governments. Luxembourg has a collegial governmental system; often, the government will present its resignation, only for the successor government to include many, if not most, of the previous ministers serving under the same prime minister. Each of the smaller dates reflects a change in the government without a change of prime minister.

== Era of independents (1848–1918) ==
From the promulgation of the first constitution, in 1848, until the early twentieth century, Luxembourgish politics was dominated by independent politicians and statesmen. The prerogative powers of the grand duke remained undiluted, and, as such, the monarch actively chose and personally appointed the prime minister. As a result, the prime minister was often a moderate, without any strong affiliation no to either of the two major ideological factions in the Chamber of Deputies: the secularist liberals and the Catholic conservatives.

In the early twentieth century, the emergence of socialism as a third force in Luxembourgish politics ended the dominance of independents, and further politicised the government of the country. This did not affect the prime minister's position until 1915, when the long-serving Paul Eyschen died in office. His death created a struggle for power between the main factions, leading to the establishment of the formalised party system.

=== Prime ministers from 1848 to 1890 ===
Name (Birth–Death)		Portrait	Term of office			Monarch (Reign)
Name (Birth–Death)		Portrait	No.	Start	End	Monarch (Reign)
1	Gaspard-Théodore-Ignace de la Fontaine (1787–1871)		1 August 1848		6 December 1848	Willem II (1840–1849)
1	Gaspard-Théodore-Ignace de la Fontaine (1787–1871)		First Prime Minister. Resigned following a Vote of no confidence.			Willem II (1840–1849)
2	Jean-Jacques Madeleine Willmar (1792–1866)		6 December 1848		23 September 1853	Willem III (1849–1890)
2	Jean-Jacques Madeleine Willmar (1792–1866)		Dismissed by the Governor			Willem III (1849–1890)
3	Charles-Mathias Simons (1802–1874)		1; 2; 3; 4; 5; 6; 7; 8	23 September 1853; 23 September 1854; 24 May 1856; 2 June 1857; 29 November 1857; 12 November 1858; 23 June 1859; 15 July 1859	23 September 1854; 24 May 1856; 2 June 1857; 29 November 1857; 12 November 1858; 23 June 1859; 15 July 1859; 26 September 1860	Willem III (1849–1890)
3	Charles-Mathias Simons (1802–1874)		Coup of 1856. President of the Council until November 1857; thereafter President of the Government. Resigned.			Willem III (1849–1890)
4	Victor, Baron de Tornaco (1805–1875)		1; 2; 3; 4; 5; 6; 7	26 September 1860; 9 September 1863; 31 March 1864; 26 January 1866; 3 December 1866; 14 December 1866; 18 June 1867	9 September 1863; 31 March 1864; 26 January 1866; 3 December 1866; 14 December 1866; 18 June 1867; 3 December 1867	Willem III (1849–1890)
4	Victor, Baron de Tornaco (1805–1875)		Shortest cabinet, December 1866. Luxembourg Crisis; Treaty of London. Resigned following a Vote of no confidence.			Willem III (1849–1890)
5	Lambert Joseph Emmanuel Servais (1811–1890)		1; 2; 3; 4; 5	3 December 1867; 30 September 1869; 12 October 1869; 7 February 1870; 25 May 1873	30 September 1869; 12 October 1869; 7 February 1870; 25 May 1873; 26 December 1874	Willem III (1849–1890)
5	Lambert Joseph Emmanuel Servais (1811–1890)		Resigned.			Willem III (1849–1890)
6	Félix, Baron de Blochausen (1834–1915)		1; 2; 3; 4; 5; 6	26 December 1874; 26 April 1875; 8 July 1876; 6 August 1878; 21 September 1882; 12 October 1882	26 April 1875; 8 July 1876; 6 August 1878; 21 September 1882; 12 October 1882; 20 February 1885	Willem III (1849–1890)
6	Félix, Baron de Blochausen (1834–1915)		Dismissed by the Grand Duke.			Willem III (1849–1890)
7	Jules Georges Édouard Thilges (1817–1904)		20 February 1885		22 September 1888	Willem III (1849–1890)
7	Jules Georges Édouard Thilges (1817–1904)		Resigned.			Willem III (1849–1890)

The Kingdom of the Netherlands shared the same monarchs with the Grand Duchy of Luxembourg from 1815 to 1890. The Grand Duchy has had its own monarchs since 1890.

=== Prime ministers from 1890 to 1918 ===
Name (Birth–Death)		Portrait	Term of office			Monarch (Reign)
Name (Birth–Death)		Portrait	No.	Start	End	Monarch (Reign)
8	Paul Eyschen (1841–1915)		1; 2; 3; 4; 5; 6	22 September 1888; 26 October 1892; 23 June 1896; 25 October 1905; 9 January 1910; 3 March 1915	26 October 1892; 23 June 1896; 25 October 1905; 9 January 1910; 3 March 1915; 11 October 1915	Adolphe (1890–1905) Guillaume IV (1905–1912)
8	Paul Eyschen (1841–1915)		Longest premiership. Longest cabinet 1896–1905. Luxembourg occupied by Germany on 2 August 1914. Died in office.			Adolphe (1890–1905) Guillaume IV (1905–1912)
9	Mathias Mongenast (1843–1926)		12 October 1915		6 November 1915	Marie-Adélaïde (1912–1919)
9	Mathias Mongenast (1843–1926)		Shortest premiership. Ruled as President of the Council. Resigned.			Marie-Adélaïde (1912–1919)
10	Hubert Loutsch (1878–1946)		6 November 1915		24 February 1916	Marie-Adélaïde (1912–1919)
10	Hubert Loutsch (1878–1946)		Minority government. Resigned following a Vote of no confidence.			Marie-Adélaïde (1912–1919)
11	Victor Thorn (1844–1930)		24 February 1916		19 June 1917	Marie-Adélaïde (1912–1919)
11	Victor Thorn (1844–1930)		National Union Government. Resigned.			Marie-Adélaïde (1912–1919)
12	Léon Kauffman (1869–1952)		19 June 1917		28 September 1918	Marie-Adélaïde (1912–1919)
12	Léon Kauffman (1869–1952)		Resigned.			Marie-Adélaïde (1912–1919)

== Party system (1918–present) ==
In 1918, towards the end of World War I, a new Chamber of Deputies was elected with the explicit ambition of reviewing the constitution. To this end, formalised parties were formed by the main political blocs, so as to increase their bargaining power in the negotiations. The revisions to the constitution introduced universal suffrage and compulsory voting, adopted proportional representation, and limited the sovereignty of the monarch.

Since the foundation of the party system, only one cabinet (between 1921 and 1925) has not included members of more than one party. Most of the time, governments are grand coalitions of the two largest parties, no matter their ideology; this has made Luxembourg one of the most stable democracies in the world. Two cabinets (between 1945 and 1947) included members of every party represented in the Chamber of Deputies.

During the occupation of Luxembourg by Nazi Germany in World War II, Luxembourg was governed by a Nazi Party official, Gustav Simon. Pierre Dupong continued to lead the government in exile in the United Kingdom until the liberation of Luxembourg in December 1944, whereupon the constitutional Luxembourg government returned to the Grand Duchy. Thus, although Luxembourg was formally annexed on 30 August 1942, the prime minister of the government in exile, Pierre Dupong, is assumed to have remained prime minister throughout.

=== Prime ministers since 1918 ===
Political Party: PD PNI CSV DP

No.	Name (Birth–Death)	Portrait	Political party	Term of office			Government	Coalition	Monarch (Reign)
No.	Name (Birth–Death)	Portrait	Political party	Election	Start	End	Government	Coalition	Monarch (Reign)
13	Émile Reuter (1874–1973)		PD	— 1919; 1922	28 September 1918; 5 January 1920; 15 April 1921	5 January 1920; 15 April 1921; 20 March 1925	Reuter	PD, LL; PD, LL; PD	Marie-Adélaïde (1912–1919)
13	Émile Reuter (1874–1973)		PD	— 1919; 1922	28 September 1918; 5 January 1920; 15 April 1921	5 January 1920; 15 April 1921; 20 March 1925	Reuter	PD, LL; PD, LL; PD	Charlotte (1919–1964)
13	Émile Reuter (1874–1973)		PD	First partisan government. Armistice; Constitution amended. Only one-party cabinet 1921–1925. Resigned.					Charlotte (1919–1964)
14	Pierre Prüm (1886–1950)		PNI	1925	20 March 1925	16 July 1926	Prüm	PNI, PRS	Charlotte (1919–1964)
14	Pierre Prüm (1886–1950)		PNI	Only PNI premiership. Resigned.					Charlotte (1919–1964)
15	Joseph Bech (1887–1975) (1st time)		PD	1928, 1931; 1934; 1937	16 July 1926; 11 April 1932; 27 December 1936	11 April 1932; 27 December 1936; 5 November 1937	Bech	PD, LdG; PD, PRL; PD, PRL	Charlotte (1919–1964)
15	Joseph Bech (1887–1975) (1st time)		PD	Longest party-era cabinet 1926–1932. Resigned.					Charlotte (1919–1964)
16	Pierre Dupong (1885–1953)		PD	— — —	5 November 1937; 7 February 1938; 6 April 1940	7 February 1938; 6 April 1940; 10 May 1940	Dupong-Krier	PD, POL, PRL; PD, POL; PD, POL	Charlotte (1919–1964)
16	Pierre Dupong (1885–1953)		PD	—	10 May 1940	23 November 1944	Govt. in Exile	PD, POL	Charlotte (1919–1964)
16	Pierre Dupong (1885–1953)		CSV	— — —	23 November 1944; 23 February 1945; 21 April 1945	23 February 1945; 21 April 1945; 14 November 1945	Liberation	CSV, LSAP	Charlotte (1919–1964)
16	Pierre Dupong (1885–1953)		CSV	1945 —	14 November 1945; 29 August 1946	29 August 1946; 1 March 1947	National Union	CSV, LSAP, GD, KPL	Charlotte (1919–1964)
16	Pierre Dupong (1885–1953)		CSV	— 1948	1 March 1947; 14 July 1948	14 July 1948; 3 July 1951	Dupong-Schaus	CSV, GD	Charlotte (1919–1964)
16	Pierre Dupong (1885–1953)		CSV	1951	3 July 1951	23 December 1953	Dupong-Bodson	CSV, LSAP	Charlotte (1919–1964)
16	Pierre Dupong (1885–1953)		CSV	World War II; Luxembourg remained neutral. Emergency government; Nazi occupation; government in exile. Liberation Governments; neutrality ended. National Union Governments. Died in office.					Charlotte (1919–1964)
17	Joseph Bech (1887–1975) (2nd time)		CSV	— 1954	29 December 1953; 29 June 1954	29 June 1954; 29 March 1958	Bech-Bodson	CSV, LSAP	Charlotte (1919–1964)
17	Joseph Bech (1887–1975) (2nd time)		CSV	Resigned.					Charlotte (1919–1964)
18	Pierre Frieden (1892–1959)		CSV	1959	29 March 1958	23 February 1959	Frieden	CSV, LSAP	Charlotte (1919–1964)
18	Pierre Frieden (1892–1959)		CSV	Won 1959 election; died in office.					Charlotte (1919–1964)
19	Pierre Werner (1913–2002) (1st time)		CSV	—	2 March 1959	15 July 1964	Werner-Schaus I	CSV, DP	Charlotte (1919–1964)
19	Pierre Werner (1913–2002) (1st time)		CSV	1964 —	15 July 1964; 3 January 1967	3 January 1967; 6 February 1969	Werner-Cravatte	CSV, LSAP	Jean (1964–2000)
19	Pierre Werner (1913–2002) (1st time)		CSV	1968 — —	6 February 1969; 5 July 1971; 19 September 1972	5 July 1971; 19 September 1972; 15 June 1974	Werner-Schaus II	CSV, DP	Jean (1964–2000)
19	Pierre Werner (1913–2002) (1st time)		CSV	Longest party-era premiership. Went into opposition following 1974 election.					Jean (1964–2000)
20	Gaston Thorn (1928–2007)		DP	1974 — —	15 June 1974; 21 July 1976; 16 September 1977	21 July 1976; 16 September 1977; 16 July 1979	Thorn	DP, LSAP	Jean (1964–2000)
20	Gaston Thorn (1928–2007)		DP	First DP premiership. Became Deputy Prime Minister under Werner when CSV returned to government following 1979 election.					Jean (1964–2000)
21	Pierre Werner (1913–2002) (2nd time)		CSV	1979 —	16 July 1979; 3 March 1980	3 March 1980; 22 November 1980	Werner-Thorn	CSV, DP	Jean (1964–2000)
21	Pierre Werner (1913–2002) (2nd time)		CSV	— —	22 November 1980; 21 December 1982	21 December 1982; 20 July 1984	Werner-Flesch	CSV, DP	Jean (1964–2000)
21	Pierre Werner (1913–2002) (2nd time)		CSV	Retired at 1984 election.					Jean (1964–2000)
22	Jacques Santer (born 1937)		CSV	1984	20 July 1984	14 July 1989	Santer-Poos I	CSV, LSAP	Jean (1964–2000)
22	Jacques Santer (born 1937)		CSV	1989 —	14 July 1989; 9 December 1992	9 December 1992; 13 July 1994	Santer-Poos II	CSV, LSAP	Jean (1964–2000)
22	Jacques Santer (born 1937)		CSV	1994	13 July 1994	26 January 1995	Santer-Poos III	CSV, LSAP	Jean (1964–2000)
22	Jacques Santer (born 1937)		CSV	President of the Government until 1989; Prime Minister from 1989. Appointed EC President.					Jean (1964–2000)
23	Jean-Claude Juncker (born 1954)		CSV	— —	26 January 1995; 4 February 1998	4 February 1998; 7 August 1999	Juncker-Poos	CSV, LSAP	Jean (1964–2000)
23	Jean-Claude Juncker (born 1954)		CSV	1999	7 August 1999	31 July 2004	Juncker-Polfer	CSV, DP	Henri (2000–2025)
23	Jean-Claude Juncker (born 1954)		CSV	2004	31 July 2004	23 July 2009	Juncker-Asselborn I	CSV, LSAP	Henri (2000–2025)
23	Jean-Claude Juncker (born 1954)		CSV	2009	23 July 2009	4 December 2013	Juncker-Asselborn II	CSV, LSAP	Henri (2000–2025)
23	Jean-Claude Juncker (born 1954)		CSV	Longest uninterrupted party-era premiership. Also President of the Eurogroup. Appointed EC President.					Henri (2000–2025)
24	Xavier Bettel (born 1973)		DP	2013	4 December 2013	5 December 2018	Bettel I	DP, LSAP, DG	Henri (2000–2025)
24	Xavier Bettel (born 1973)		DP	2018	5 December 2018	17 November 2023	Bettel II	DP, LSAP, DG	Henri (2000–2025)
25	Luc Frieden (born 1963)		CSV	2023	17 November 2023	Incumbent	Frieden-Bettel	CSV, DP	Henri (2000–2025)
25	Luc Frieden (born 1963)		CSV	2023	17 November 2023	Incumbent	Frieden-Bettel	CSV, DP	Guillaume V (2025–present)

== See also ==
- List of monarchs of Luxembourg
- Lists of office-holders
- List of presidents of the Council of State of Luxembourg
