= Pierre Grégoire (politician) =

Luxembourgian politician (1907–1991)

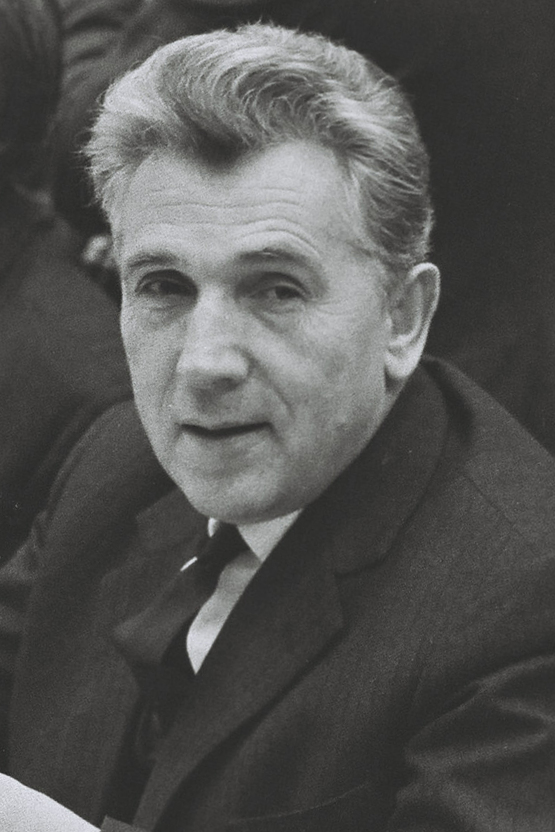
Pierre Grégoire, 1967

Pierre Grégoire (9 November 1907 – 8 April 1991) was a Luxembourgish politician in the Christian Social People's Party (CSV), journalist, and writer. Before turning to politics full-time, he wrote for the Luxemburger Wort newspaper.

Before World War II, he organised the development of the CSV's precursor, the Party of the Right, along with Jean Baptiste Esch. He was a CSV Deputy from 1946 onwards, and was the party's secretary-general from 1952 to 1960. He was a member of the Council of Europe from 1956.

He also held several government posts: he was the minister for the Interior, Religion, Arts and Sciences and Transport from 1959 to 1964, then became minister for Cultural Affairs, Education and the Civil Service from 1964 onwards. From 1969 to 1974 he was the president of the Chamber of Deputies.

Political offices
Preceded by Victor Bodson	Minister for Transport; 1959 – 1964	Succeeded by Albert Bousser
Preceded by Marcel Fischbach	Minister for Defence; 1967 – 1969	Succeeded by Eugène Schaus
Preceded by Pierre Werner	Minister for Foreign Affairs; 1967 – 1969	Succeeded by Gaston Thorn
Preceded by Giuseppe Medici	President of the Council of the EU; First half 1969	Succeeded by Joseph Luns
Preceded by Romain Fandel	President of the Chamber of Deputies; 1969 – 1974	Succeeded by Antoine Wehenkel
