= President of the government =

President of the government, chairman of the government, or head of the government is a term used in official statements to describe several Prime Ministers.

- Andorra, Prime Minister of Andorra, Cap de Govern del Principat d'Andorra
- Brunei, Sultan of Brunei Darussalam
- Croatia, Prime Minister of Croatia
- Greece, Prime Minister of Greece, Πρόεδρος της Κυβέρνησης
- Hong Kong, Chief Executive of Hong Kong
- Lebanon, Prime Minister of Lebanon
- Macau, Chief Executive of Macau
- Philippines, Prime Minister of the Philippines (defunct), President of the Philippines
- Serbia, Prime Minister of Serbia
- Slovenia, Prime Minister of Slovenia
- Spain, Prime Minister of Spain
- Vatican City, President of the Pontifical Commission for Vatican City State
- United States, President of the United States

Chairman of the Government can refer to:

- Adjara, Chairman of the Government of Adjara
- Czech Republic, Prime Minister of the Czech Republic
- Russia, Prime Minister of Russia
- Slovakia, Prime Minister of Slovakia
- Transnistria, Prime Minister of Transnistria

Head of the Government can refer to:

- Austria, Chancellor of Austria
- Algeria, Prime Minister of Algeria
- Germany, Chancellor of Germany
- Tunisia, Prime Minister of Tunisia
- Israel, Prime Minister of Israel
- Morocco, Prime Minister of Morocco
- Syria, Prime Minister of Syria

== See also ==
- President (government title)
