= List of ministers for transport of Luxembourg =

The minister for transport (French: ministre des transports) was a position in the Luxembourgish cabinet. The minister for transport was responsible for maintenance and revision of the road network, operation of public transport, and regulation of aviation and waterways.

On 23 July 2009, the position was merged with those of the Ministry for the Environment and Minister for Public Works to form the new position of Minister for Sustainable Development and Infrastructure, under Claude Wiseler.

== List of ministers for transport ==
Minister	Party	Start date	End date	Prime Minister
Étienne Schmit	PRL	5 November 1937	7 February 1938	Pierre Dupong
René Blum (ad interim)	POS	7 February 1938	6 April 1940	Pierre Dupong
Victor Bodson (first time)	POS	6 April 1940	14 November 1945	Pierre Dupong
Victor Bodson (first time)	LSAP	14 November 1945	1 March 1947	Pierre Dupong
Robert Schaffner	GD	1 March 1947	3 July 1951	Pierre Dupong
Victor Bodson (second time)	LSAP	3 July 1951	29 December 1953	Pierre Dupong
Victor Bodson (second time)	LSAP	29 December 1953	29 March 1958	Joseph Bech
Victor Bodson (second time)	LSAP	29 March 1958	2 March 1959	Pierre Frieden
Pierre Grégoire	CSV	2 March 1959	15 July 1964	Pierre Werner
Albert Bousser	LSAP	15 July 1964	6 February 1969	Pierre Werner
Marcel Mart	DP	6 February 1969	15 June 1974	Pierre Werner
Marcel Mart	DP	15 June 1974	16 September 1977	Gaston Thorn
Josy Barthel	DP	16 September 1977	16 July 1979	Gaston Thorn
Josy Barthel	DP	16 July 1979	20 July 1984	Pierre Werner
Marcel Schlechter	LSAP	20 July 1984	14 July 1989	Jacques Santer
Robert Goebbels	LSAP	14 July 1989	13 July 1994	Jacques Santer
Mady Delvaux-Stehres	LSAP	13 July 1994	26 January 1995	Jacques Santer
Mady Delvaux-Stehres	LSAP	26 January 1995	9 August 1999	Jean-Claude Juncker
Henri Grethen	DP	9 August 1999	31 July 2004	Jean-Claude Juncker
Lucien Lux	LSAP	31 July 2004	23 July 2009	Jean-Claude Juncker
