= Robert Schaffner =

Luxembourgish politician (1905-1979)

Member of the Chamber of Deputies
- In office: 1945–1947; 1951–1958; 1964–1968; 1969–1979

Mayor of Echternach
- In office 1945–1947; 1970–1979

Minister for Public Works
- In office 1947–1951; 1959–1964

Minister for Transport
- In office 1947–1951

Personal details
- Born: 24 July 1905
- Died: 2 August 1979 (aged 74)
- Party: Democratic

Robert Schaffner (24 July 1905 – 2 August 1979) was a Luxembourgish politician.

A founding member of the Patriotic and Democratic Group (GPD), now the Democratic Party, Schaffner entered politics after the German occupation during the Second World War. In 1945, he was elected to the Chamber of Deputies, in which he would remain (including spells as a government minister) until his death over three decades later.

He entered Pierre Dupong's government in 1947 as Minister for Public Works and Minister for Transport, replacing the Luxembourg Socialist Workers' Party's Victor Bodson. He remained in these positions for four years, before the ejection of the GPD from government in favour of the Luxembourg Socialist Workers' Party saw the roles reverse and Bodson return to the cabinet in Schaffner's place.

Schaffner was twice mayor of Echternach, from 1945 to 1947, and from 1970 to 1979.

T. Glad Bincham and A.W. Hurll, then General Secretary of The Boy Scouts Association, paid a visit to Belgium, the Netherlands, Luxembourg and France in October 1945. They were able to make valuable first-hand contacts with the leaders of the Scout movements in these countries, and to learn more of how Scouting had played a part during the occupation, and how it proposed to meet the future. In Luxembourg, they were received by Schaffner, the Scout Commissioner, who had been elected mayor of the ruined town of Echternach the day before, and was already drawing up plans for its reconstruction.

Political offices
| Preceded by Victor Bodson | Minister for Public Works; 1947–1951; 1959–1964 | Succeeded by Victor Bodson |
| Preceded by Victor Bodson | Minister for Transport; 1947–1951 | Succeeded by Victor Bodson |
