= Nicolas Biever =

Luxembourgish politician

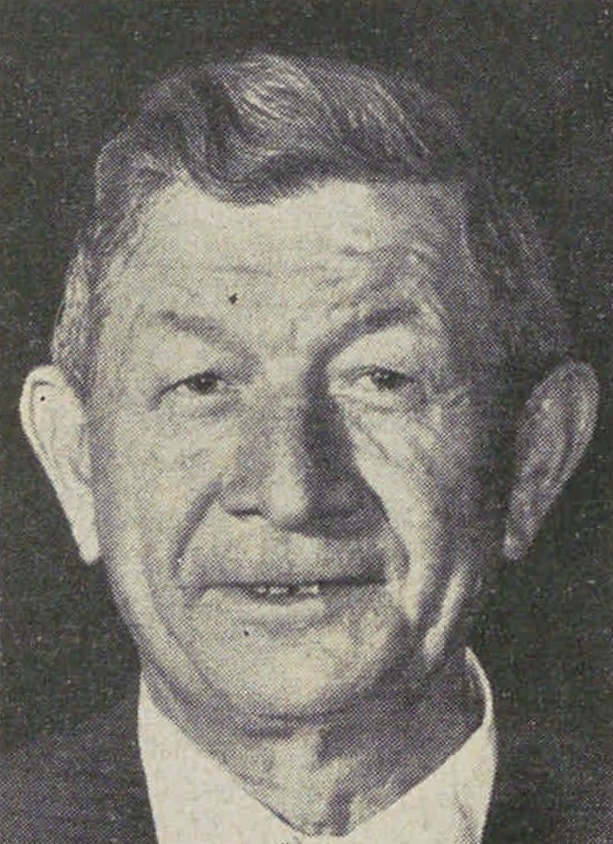
Biever c. 1954

Nicolas "Nic" Biever (22 May 1894 – 15 July 1965) was a Luxembourgish politician.

Nic Biever worked in ARBED's factory in Dudelange. In February 1919, he became secretary of the Dudelange section of the trade union Luxembourg Mining and Metalworkers' Union (LBMV), and in February 1920 became one of two secretaries of the LBMV. From 1938 onwards he was the president of the union. He was elected a member of the Dudelange city council on 14 October 1924, and an LSAP member of the Chamber of Deputies on 1 March 1925. Apart from the war years of 1940–1944, and his tenure as a minister, he would continue to hold these offices. On 12 March 1945 he was appointed a member of the Consultative Assembly, as a former Deputy. From 3 July 1951 to 1 February 1959 he was Minister for Labour in the governments of Dupong-Bodson and Bech-Bodson, and again from 15 July 1964 until his death on 15 July 1965, in the Werner-Cravatte government.

== Legacy ==
The following are named after him:

- Rue Nicolas Biever in Rodange
- Rue Nicolas Biever in Esch
- Rue Nic. Biever in Dudelange
- Lycée Nic-Biever in Dudelange

== Honours ==
- Grand Officer of the Order of the Oak Crown
