= René Blum (politician) =

Luxembourgish politician (1889–1967)

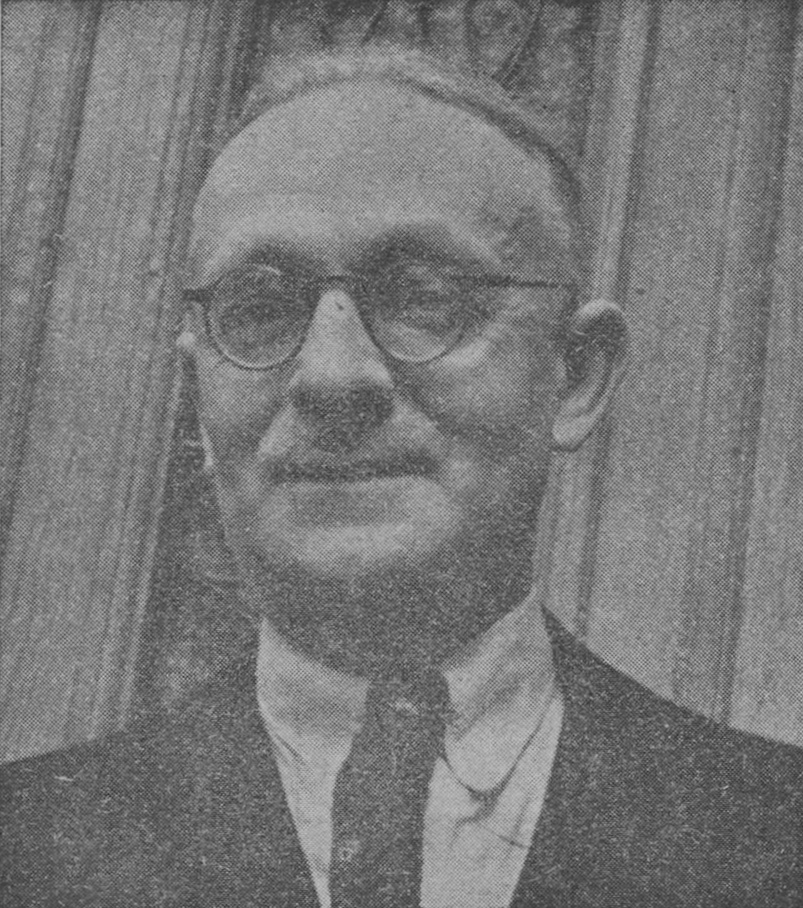
Blum c. 1937

René Blum (17 February 1889 – 25 December 1967) was a Luxembourgish politician, diplomat, and jurist. He sat in the Chamber of Deputies from 1918 until 1937, when he became a government minister. He was briefly the President of the Chamber, from 1925 until 1926.

In government, Blum held the offices of Minister for Justice and Minister for Transport, before the outbreak of the Second World War cut these tenures short. After the war, Blum served as the country's first Ambassador to the Soviet Union (1944–55). During his time as the Justice Minister, Blum allowed a refugee from Germany to stay in the country until he was able to make it safely out of Europe.

Political offices
Preceded by François Altwies	President of the Chamber of Deputies; 1925 – 1926	Succeeded by Émile Reuter
Preceded by Étienne Schmit	Minister for Justice; 1937 – 1940	Succeeded by Victor Bodson
Preceded by Étienne Schmit	Minister for Public Works; 1937 – 1940	Succeeded by Victor Bodson
Preceded by Étienne Schmit	Minister for Transport; 1938 – 1940	Succeeded by Victor Bodson
