= List of ministers for defence of Luxembourg =

The minister for defence (Luxembourgish: Verdeedegungsminister; French: ministre de la défense; German: Verteidigungsminister) is a position in the Luxembourg cabinet. Among other competences, the minister for defence is responsible for overseeing the maintenance and deployment of the armed forces, for veterans, for aiding in the execution of the orders of the commander-in-chief, the grand duke.

The position has existed since 5 November 1937. From its creation until 6 February 1969, the position's name was Minister for the Armed Force (Ministre de la Force Armée). From 1969 until 7 August 1999, the official title of the office was Minister for the Public Force (Ministre de la Force publique). In 1999, the briefs of international cooperation and humanitarian relief were added to that of defence, creating the office of Minister for Cooperation, Humanitarian Action, and Defence (French: Ministre de la Coopération, de l’Action humanitaire, et de la Défense). In 2004, the positions were separated again, creating the current title.

== List of ministers for defence ==
Minister	Party	Start date	End date	Prime Minister
Pierre Dupong	PD	5 November 1937	23 November 1944	Pierre Dupong
Pierre Dupong	CSV	23 November 1944	1 March 1947	Pierre Dupong
Lambert Schaus	CSV	1 March 1947	14 July 1948	Pierre Dupong
Pierre Dupong	CSV	14 July 1948	3 July 1951	Pierre Dupong
Joseph Bech	CSV	3 July 1951	29 December 1953	Pierre Dupong
Pierre Werner	CSV	29 December 1953	29 March 1958	Joseph Bech
Pierre Werner	CSV	29 March 1958	2 March 1959	Pierre Frieden
Eugène Schaus	DP	2 March 1959	15 July 1964	Pierre Werner
Marcel Fischbach	CSV	15 July 1964	3 January 1967	Pierre Werner
Pierre Grégoire	CSV	3 January 1967	6 February 1969	Pierre Werner
Eugène Schaus	DP	6 February 1969	15 June 1974	Pierre Werner
Émile Krieps	DP	15 June 1974	16 July 1979	Gaston Thorn
Émile Krieps	DP	16 July 1979	20 July 1984	Pierre Werner
Marc Fischbach	CSV	20 July 1984	14 July 1989	Jacques Santer
Jacques Poos	LSAP	14 July 1989	13 July 1994	Jacques Santer
Alex Bodry	LSAP	13 July 1994	26 January 1995	Jacques Santer
Alex Bodry	LSAP	26 January 1995	7 August 1999	Jean-Claude Juncker
Charles Goerens	DP	7 August 1999	31 July 2004	Jean-Claude Juncker
Luc Frieden	CSV	31 July 2004	22 February 2006	Jean-Claude Juncker
Jean-Louis Schiltz	CSV	22 February 2006	23 July 2009	Jean-Claude Juncker
Jean-Marie Halsdorf	CSV	23 July 2009	4 December 2013	Jean-Claude Juncker
Etienne Schneider	LSAP	4 December 2013	5 December 2018	Xavier Bettel
François Bausch	The Greens	5 December 2018	17 November 2023	Xavier Bettel
Yuriko Backes	DP	17 November 2023	Incumbent	Luc Frieden
