= Pierre Werner =

Luxembourgish politician (1913–2002)

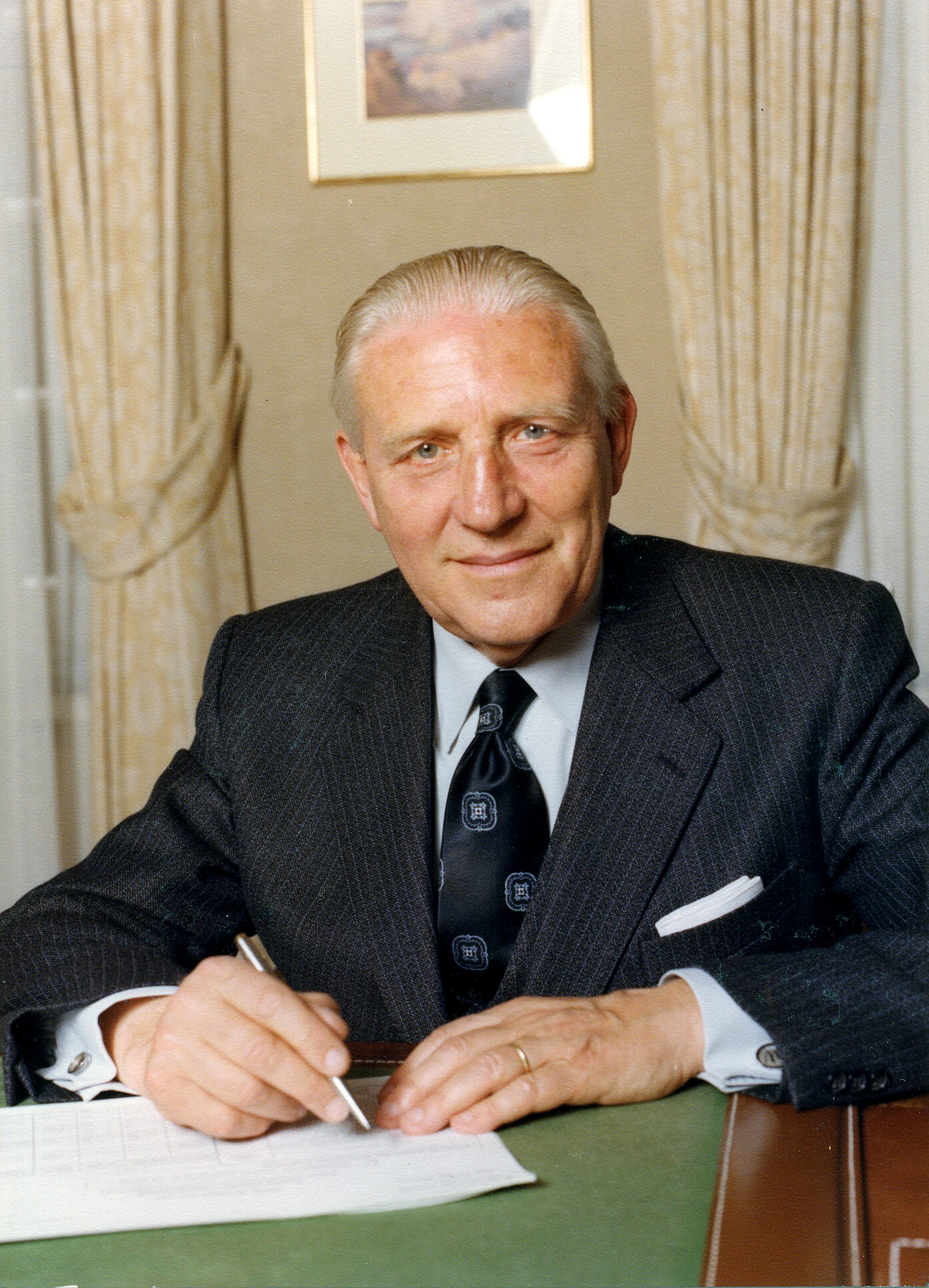

Prime Minister of Luxembourg
- In office 16 July 1979 – 20 July 1984
- Monarch: Jean
- Preceded by: Gaston Thorn
- Succeeded by: Jacques Santer
- In office 2 March 1959 – 15 June 1974
- Monarchs: Charlotte; Jean
- Preceded by: Pierre Frieden
- Succeeded by: Gaston Thorn

Minister of Finances
- In office 23 December 1953 – 15 June 1974
- Prime Minister: Joseph Bech; Pierre Frieden; Himself
- Preceded by: Pierre Dupong
- Succeeded by: Raymond Vouel

Minister of Justice
- In office 2 March 1959 – 3 January 1967
- Prime Minister: Himself
- Preceded by: Victor Bodson
- Succeeded by: Jean Dupong

Minister of Foreign Affairs
- In office 15 July 1964 – 3 January 1967
- Prime Minister: Himself
- Preceded by: Eugène Schaus
- Succeeded by: Pierre Grégoire

Minister of Defence
- In office 23 December 1953 – 2 March 1959
- Prime Minister: Joseph Bech; Pierre Frieden
- Preceded by: Joseph Bech
- Succeeded by: Eugène Schaus

Personal details
- Born: 29 December 1913 Saint-André-lez-Lille, France
- Died: 24 June 2002 (aged 88) Luxembourg, Luxembourg
- Party: Christian Social People's

Pierre Werner (29 December 1913 – 24 June 2002) was a Luxembourgish politician of the Christian Social People's Party (CSV) who was the prime minister of Luxembourg from 1959 to 1974 and from 1979 to 1984.

== Training and early activities ==
Pierre Werner was born in Saint-André-lez-Lille, Nord, France, to Luxembourgish parents. He studied at the Cours Supérieurs de Luxembourg (a forerunner to the University of Luxembourg) from 1933 to 1934 and continued his higher education at the Law Faculty of the University of Paris and the École libre des sciences politiques from 1934 to 1937. In 1938, he completed a PhD in law in Luxembourg. He was involved in several student organisations, becoming chairman of the Association of Catholic Students from 1935 to 1937 and vice-president of the Pax Romana movement (The International Movement for Intellectual and Cultural Affairs) in 1937.

In 1938 he became a lawyer in Luxembourg City, before becoming a banker instead. During the Nazi occupation of Luxembourg (1940–1945) Werner gave clandestine support to the resistance against the occupation forces. After World War II he became the Controller of the banking system in his country. He attended the Bretton Woods Conference which set up the International Monetary Fund (IMF).

== Government ==
Werner was appointed as Finance Minister of Luxembourg in 1953, and was 19th and 21st Prime Minister from 1959 to 1974 and from 1979 to 1984. He also served as Minister for Culture.

As head of government, he governed in coalition with the Democratic Party (1959–1964), then the Luxembourg Socialist Workers' Party (1964–1969), then the DP again (1969–1974). Werner and the CSV went into opposition for the first time since World War II from 1974 to 1979. When he returned to power, his last government was another coalition with the DP (1979–1984).

Werner was instrumental in solving the "empty chair" crisis provoked in 1965 by President Charles de Gaulle who, dissatisfied with the orientations of European integration at that time, had decided France would suspend its participation in meetings with other Member States; Werner persuaded France to resume its seat, thus re-enabling the decision-making process. In 1970, Werner was given the mandate by the heads of State or government to draft, with a group of experts, a blueprint for an economic and monetary union within the EEC. His report advocated gradual reforms, the irreversible fixing of exchange rates, and the introduction of a single currency within a decade. As it happened, the plan was not implemented at the time, due to internal political disagreements, and the oil crisis; however the “Werner Plan” was later revived and extended by Jacques Delors. Its principles were enshrined in the Treaty of Maastricht, paving the way for the single European currency, i.e. the euro.

As Prime Minister, Werner, a Christian Democrat, undertook the diversification of the national economy, hard hit by a major Europe-wide crisis in the steel industry, by attracting new industrial investments, as well as financial services to the Grand Duchy. He placed Luxembourg on the map of global satellite communications. He is remembered for having used "tripartite" social mediation (industry, labour and government) to overcome the severe steel crisis which lasted from 1979 to 1984. He placed the process of European integration at the centre of the policy of his country. With friends such as Joseph Bech, Jean Monnet and Robert Schuman, Werner was a determined advocate of European integration. During his terms in office, he negotiated the relocation of several European institutions to Luxembourg.

The Pierre Werner Institute (Institut Pierre Werner, IPW) was created in Luxembourg in 2003 at the behest of the Foreign Ministers of France, Germany and Luxembourg (at the time, respectively Dominique de Villepin, Joschka Fischer and Lydie Polfer), the project having been fostered by Erna Hennicot-Schoepges, then Minister for Culture, Universities and Research in Luxembourg. IPW organises seminars and conferences aimed at promoting better understanding among the three founding countries, but also more widely throughout Europe.

Werner, a sponsor of culture and especially music, actively promoted the restoration of Luxembourg's heritage (e.g. Vianden Castle). A fan of cricket since living in London, the United Kingdom, in 1930, Werner was Honorary President of the Optimists Cricket Club, which he promoted during, between, and after his premierships. In his honour, Luxembourg's main cricket ground, the Pierre Werner Cricket Ground in Walferdange, is named after him.

Pierre Werner died on 24 June 2002, in Luxembourg City.

== Political responsibilities ==
Pierre Werner served as 'President of the Government' (Prime Minister) from 1959 to 1974 and from 1979 to 1984.
On each occasion this post was combined with several ministerial portfolios :

- 1954–1959: Minister of Finance and Minister of the Armed Forces;
- 1959–1964: President of the Government and Minister of Finance;
- 1964–1967: President of the Government, Minister for the Treasury, Minister for Foreign Affairs, Minister for Justice;
- 1967–1969: President of the Government, Minister for the Treasury, Minister for the Civil Service;
- 1969–1974: President of the Government, Minister for Finance;
- 1979–1984: President of the Government.

Werner was a member of parliament and leader of the CSV from 1974 to 1979. During this period he was the leader of the parliamentary opposition. In 1979 the CSV won the parliamentary elections in Luxembourg. At this time, Werner was also elected to the European Parliament but he chose not to sit as an MEP, to serve as President of the Government.

== Other activities ==
After withdrawing from politics in 1984, Pierre Werner continued to assume some official duties and pursue cultural activities. From 1985 to 1987, he was Chairman of the Governing Board of the Compagnie luxembourgeoise de télédiffusion (CLT, Radio Luxembourg). Werner placed Luxembourg on the map of global satellite communications. From 1989 to 1996, he was chairman of the board of directors of the Société Européenne des Satellites, becoming honorary chairman in 1996. During this last term of office, he had laid the ground for the establishment of this company. He worked hard both within Luxembourg and abroad to realise his vision for a medium-power satellite in Luxembourg, enabling his country to become a forerunner in global satellite telecommunications.

Pierre Werner was also a member of the National Ethics Committee of Luxembourg.

== See also ==
- List of prime ministers of Luxembourg
- Werner-Schaus Ministry I
- Werner-Cravatte Government
- Werner-Schaus Ministry II
- Werner-Thorn Ministry
- Werner-Flesch Ministry
- East-West United Bank
- Institut Monétaire Luxembourgeois

== Notes and references ==
Political offices
Preceded by Joseph Bech	Minister for Defence; 1953–1959	Succeeded by Eugène Schaus
Preceded by Pierre Dupong	Minister for Finances; 1953–1974	Succeeded by Raymond Vouel
Preceded by Victor Bodson	Minister for Justice; 1959–1967	Succeeded by Jean Dupong
Preceded by Pierre Frieden	Prime Minister of Luxembourg; 1st time 1959–1974	Succeeded by Gaston Thorn
Preceded by Eugène Schaus	Minister for Foreign Affairs; 1964–1967	Succeeded by Pierre Grégoire
Preceded by Gaston Thorn	Prime Minister of Luxembourg; 2nd time 1979–1984	Succeeded by Jacques Santer
