= Pierre Frieden =

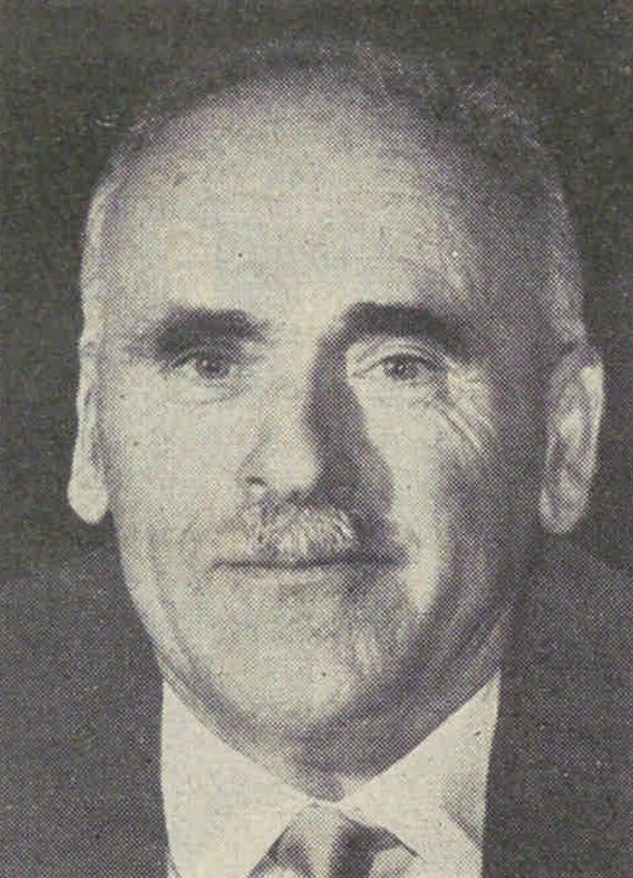
- Frieden c. 1954

Prime Minister of Luxembourg
- In office 29 March 1958 – 23 February 1959
- Monarch: Charlotte
- Preceded by: Joseph Bech
- Succeeded by: Pierre Werner

Personal details
- Born: 28 October 1892 Mertert, Luxembourg
- Died: 23 February 1959 (aged 66) Zurich, Switzerland
- Party: Christian Social People's

Pierre Frieden (28 October 1892 – 23 February 1959) was a Luxembourgish politician and writer. He was prime minister of Luxembourg, serving for eleven months, from 29 March 1958 until his death, on 23 February 1959. He also served as Interior Minister from 1951.

Frieden was born in 1892 in Mertert. From 1912 to 1916 he studied philosophy and literature in Luxembourg city and in Freiburg, Zürich, Geneva and Munich. From 1916 he taught secondary school philosophy, Latin and French in Esch-sur-Alzette, from 1919 until 1940 in the Lycée classique de Diekirch, the Athénée de Luxembourg and in the Cours supérieurs.

During the German occupation of Luxembourg in World War II, from 18 September until 4 November 1942 he was interned in Hinzert concentration camp. In 1944, after the liberation of Luxembourg, he became Minister for Education, Culture and Science under Pierre Dupong. From 14 December 1945 to 15 July 1948 he was a member of the Council of State.

He returned to his post as Minister for Education, Culture and Science in the government of Joseph Bech, who became prime minister after Pierre Dupong's death in 1953. He was also Minister for Families and the Interior. On 29 March 1958 he became prime minister.

Only a year later, in 1959, he died in Zürich.

He was married to Madeleine Kinnen, herself a politician and government minister.

== See also ==
- Frieden Ministry

Political offices
Preceded by Joseph Bech	Prime Minister of Luxembourg; 1958–1959	Succeeded by Pierre Werner
