= Victor Bodson =

Luxembourgish politician (1902–1984)

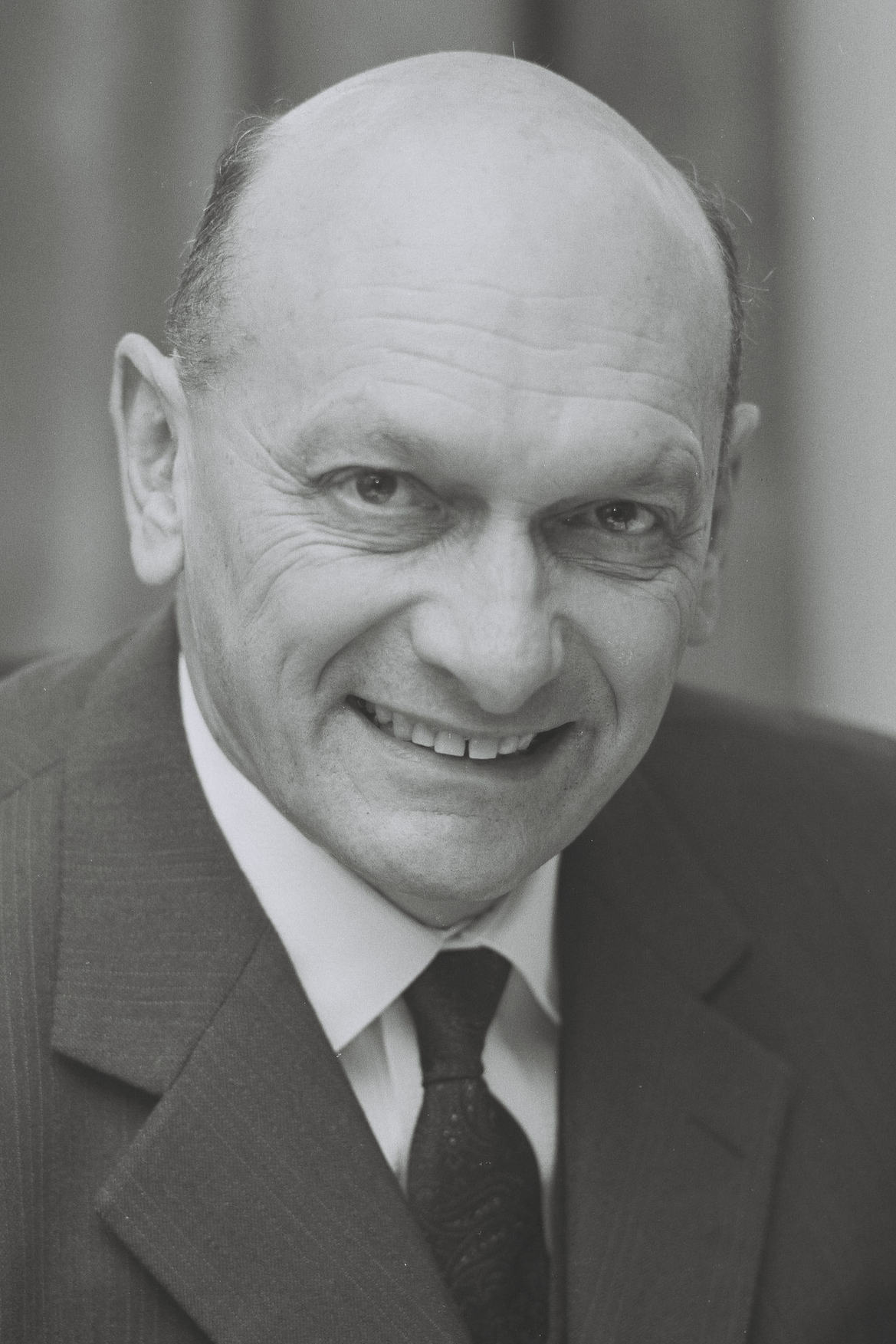
- Bodson in 1968

European Commissioner for Transport
- In office 1967–1970
- President: Jean Rey
- Preceded by: Lambert Schaus
- Succeeded by: Albert Coppé

President of the Chamber of Deputies
- In office 1964–1967
- Prime Minister: Pierre Werner
- Preceded by: Joseph Bech
- Succeeded by: Romain Fandel

Personal details
- Born: Victor Nicolas Bodson; 24 March 1902 Luxembourg City, Luxembourg
- Died: 29 June 1984 (aged 82) Mondorf-les-Bains, Luxembourg
- Party: Luxembourg Socialist Workers' Party

Victor Nicolas Bodson (24 March 1902 – 29 June 1984) was a Luxembourgish socialist politician who held the posts of Minister of Justice, Public Works, and Transport for long periods of time in the 1940s and 1950s, including in exile during World War II, when Luxembourg was occupied by Nazi Germany.

He is recognised as Righteous Among the Nations awarded by Yad Vashem for his actions during the Holocaust in occupied Luxembourg, in which he helped Jews escape persecution from the German government.

== Life ==
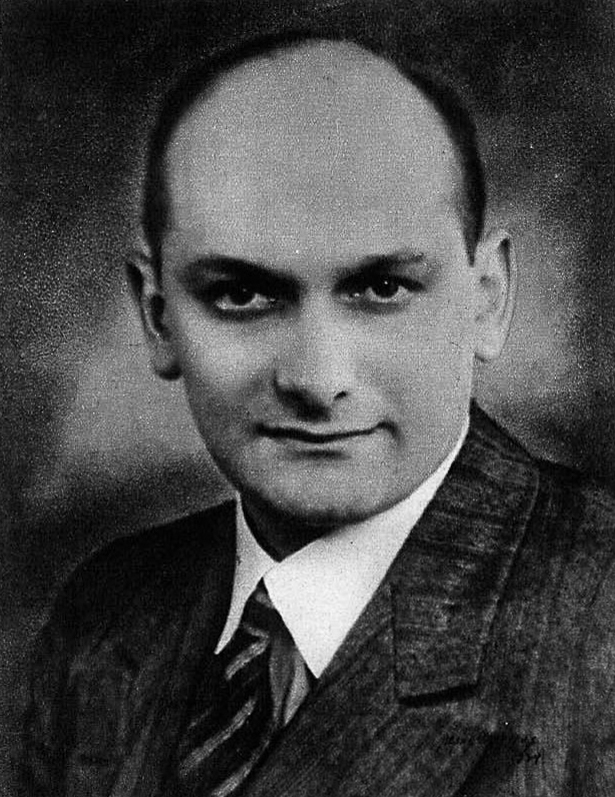
Bodson in 1935

Joseph Hubert Victor Bodson was born on 24 March 1902 in Hollerich, which later became part of Luxembourg City, to Léon Bodson (1874 - 1927), a railway stationmaster, and Thérèse Bodson (née Kimmes; 1877 - 1954). After graduating from the Athénée in 1921, he studied law at the University of Strasbourg and the University of Montpellier. He practiced as a lawyer in Luxembourg, and was a motorcyclist (Luxembourgish champion in 1926) and swimmer.

His political career started in 1930, when he became a member of the Luxembourg Socialist Workers' Party (LSAP). In 1934 he was elected into the Chamber of Deputies for the South constituency, and in 1935 he became a member of the council of Luxembourg City. he also campaigned against the Maulkuerfgesetz.

On the international level, his anti-fascist convictions led him to actively support refugee exiles from Nazi Germany, and the Republican side in the Spanish Civil War. As Consul for the Republic of Spain, organised events to raise solidarity, awareness and funds for the Republican cause (conferences, festivals, etc.) and to gather money to send Luxembourgish volunteers.

To help exiled Jews and anti-Nazi political refugees, he worked in the framework of an aid network organised by Luxembourgish trade unions, such as the Luxembourg Mining and Metalworkers' Union. Channels towards Belgium and France had been established in the early 1930s, and were used more intensively after the 1938 Kristallnacht pogroms. Persecuted Jews could thus cross the borders in secret to the Belgian ports, where they could travel to the United States. This Luxembourgish refugee channel lasted until the outbreak of hostilities, when the organisers would themselves be persecuted. Bodson himself estimated that he had helped more than 2,000 persons (Jews, political refugees, spies) escape Germany through this channel.

== Government ==
=== Ministerial appointment ===
On 6 April 1940, he became Minister for Justice, Public Works and Transport, replacing his political mentor René Blum. Officially, the Blum's departure was attributed to "personal" reasons, however in the context of the Phoney War, there had been fears inside the government of a scandal as Blum had allegedly had a romantic liaison with a female spy working for the Germans, which caused him to resign.

Bodson only had four weeks after his ministerial appointment to familiarise himself with his new post, before the war reached Luxembourg.

=== Exile to France, Portugal, Canada ===
On 10 May 1940, Germany invaded Luxembourg. Most of the government quickly departed Luxembourg City in a motorcade, but Bodson stayed behind at the Saint-Esprit Barracks to monitor the situation. He later fled and, using his knowledge of Luxembourg's secondary roads garnered while motorcycling, he was able to avoid German roadblocks and escape to France.

After arriving in Bordeaux, Victor Bodson and his family were granted transit visas from the Portuguese consul Aristides de Sousa Mendes, along with the rest of the government and the Grand Ducal Family of Luxembourg, in June 1940. Victor, along with his wife Gilberte, and their five children, Andrée, Marie, Sonia, Robert and Leon, followed the Grand Ducal family through Coimbra and Lisbon, settling at Praia das Maçãs after the Grand Ducal family had moved to Cascais. By August, the entire entourage had moved to Monte Estoril, where the Bodson family stayed at Pensão Zenith, between 30 August and 2 October 1940. The family then boarded the S.S. Excambion headed for New York City, along with the children of Pierre Dupong (Prime Minister of Luxembourg) and of Joseph Bech (Foreign Minister). They arrived on 11 October 1940 and lived in exile in Montreal. Joseph Bech and Pierre Krier on the other hand travelled to London. This physical split-up of the government would last only a year, but weighed heavily on Bodson, who felt far away from the heart of matters, and from the war. "I looked like a fifth wheel on the cart of the government [...] I became more and more impatient to leave for London," he would comment later.

=== London ===
The government-in-exile was reunited in 1941-1942, and all its members gradually established themselves in London. Bodson lived in a cottage in Byfleet, south of London, and travelled every day to 27 Wilton Crescent, the address of the Luxembourgish embassy in London.

The government was composed of two socialists, Bodson and Pierre Krier, and the Christian-social Joseph Bech and Pierre Dupong. Relations between the ministers were not always straightforward, and the government in exile's history was marked by numerous disagreements such as over the various ministries' prerogatives, matters of protocol, or minor issues of an administrative or logistical nature. Towards the end of the war, disagreements became more frequent, as the liberation of Luxembourg was in process and the government's return to the country was coming closer, heralding many political changes. In spring 1944, there were heightened tensions between Bodson and Pierre Dupong, the prime minister.

== Post-Liberation ==
After the liberation, he had the same portfolios and, as justice minister, was partially responsible for purification (épuration) in the Liberation Government, and in the National Unity Government (until 1 March 1947). In 1948 and 1951 he was re-elected to the Chamber.

In 1961 he was appointed to the Council of State. In 1964 he left the Council, and wanted to stand for election again in the Luxembourg constituency; however, his party did not see him as a sufficiently strong candidate. In the end he stood in the East constituency and was successful, and also managed to be elected President of the Chamber of Deputies.

== European Commission ==
In 1967 he was appointed as Luxembourg's European Commissioner and served on the Rey Commission until 1970. He had responsibility for Transport. In 1970, his term was not renewed by the new centre-right government, and he was replaced by Albert Borschette, a diplomat close to the liberals.

After 1970, he rarely intervened in politics.

== Righteous Among Nations award ==
Victor Bodson lived close to the river Sauer, which acts as the border between Luxemburg and Germany. Bodson helped create and operate an escape route for Jews during World War II. The route required fleeing Jews to cross over the river before meeting Bodson at his house in Steinheim. Here using a special apparatus in his car, he would ferry these people to a safe haven that had been prepared in advance by his friends.

During the course of his actions, Victor Bodson risked his life several times. Due to the results of his actions approximately 100 Jews were saved from the concentration camps.

== Legacy ==
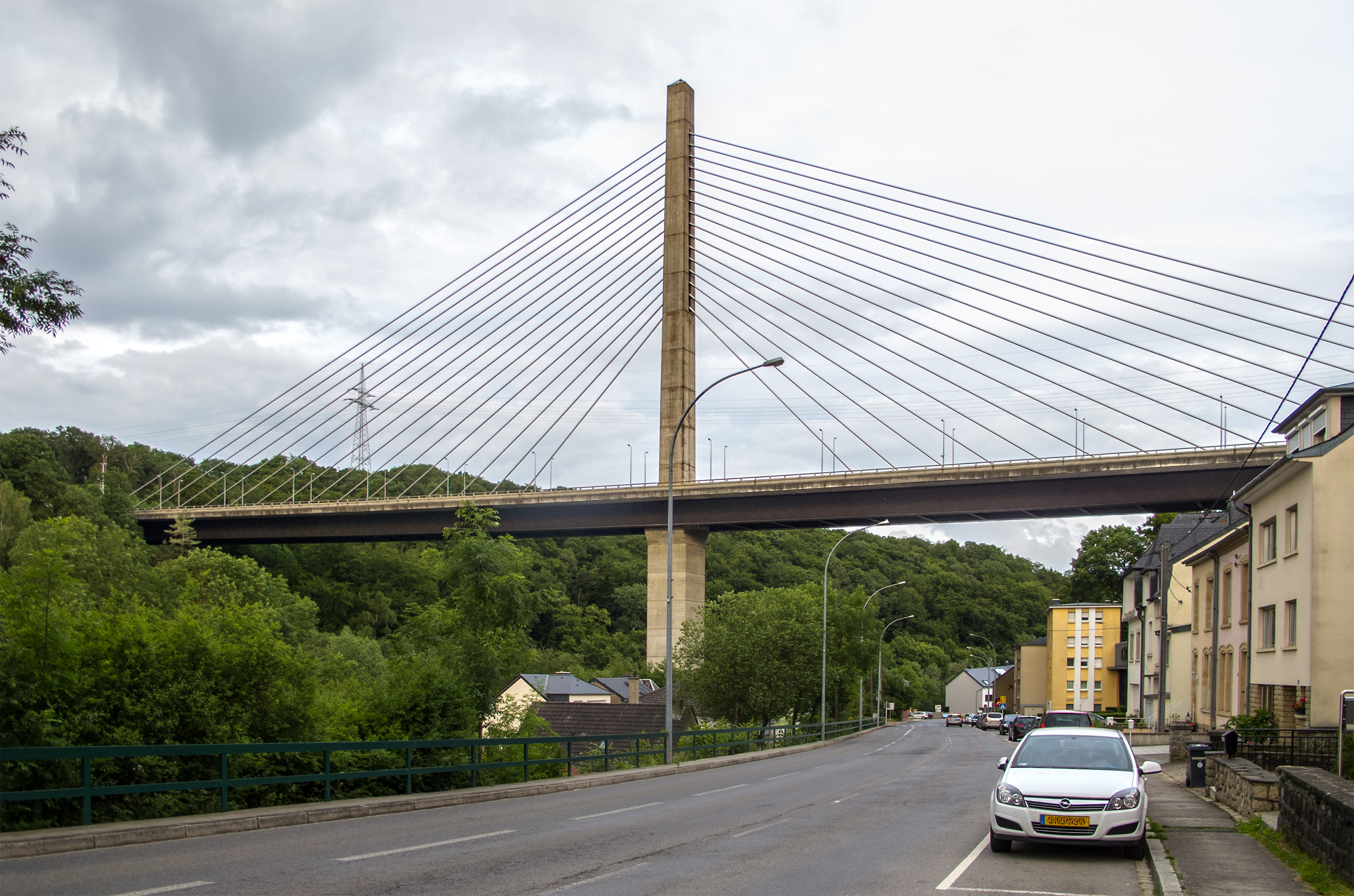
Victor Bodson Bridge in Hesperange, Luxembourg

The Victor Bodson Bridge in Hesperange, in southern Luxembourg, which carries the A1 motorway, was named after Bodson in 1994. Victor Bodson founded a law firm in Luxembourg in 1923, which is today called Wildgen, Partners in Law.

== See also ==
- Luxembourg government in exile
- Liberation Government
- National Union Government (1945)

== Bibliography and further reading ==
- Carbonell, Mauve (1 October 2016). "Victor Bodson (1902-1984): un notable luxembourgeois dans la tourmente européenne au XXe siècle. Une approche biographique". Hémecht (in French). 68 (4): 411ff.
- Grosbois, Thierry (1 April 2015). "Le gouvernement luxembourgeois en exil face à la persécution et l'extermination des Juifs 1939-1945". Hémecht (in French). 67 (2): 155ff.

Political offices
Preceded by René Blum	Minister for Justice; 1st time 1940–1947	Succeeded by Eugène Schaus
Preceded by René Blum	Minister for Public Works; 1st time 1940–1947	Succeeded by Robert Schaffner
Preceded by René Blum	Minister for Transport; 1st time 1940–1947	Succeeded by Robert Schaffner
Preceded by Eugène Schaus	Minister for Justice; 2nd time 1951–1959	Succeeded by Pierre Werner
Preceded by Robert Schaffner	Minister for Public Works; 2nd time 1951–1959	Succeeded by Robert Schaffner
Preceded by Robert Schaffner	Minister for Transport; 2nd time 1951–1959	Succeeded by Pierre Grégoire
Preceded by Joseph Bech	President of the Chamber of Deputies; 1964–1967	Succeeded by Romain Fandel
