= Joseph Bech =

Prime Minister of Luxembourg, 1926–1937, 1953–1958

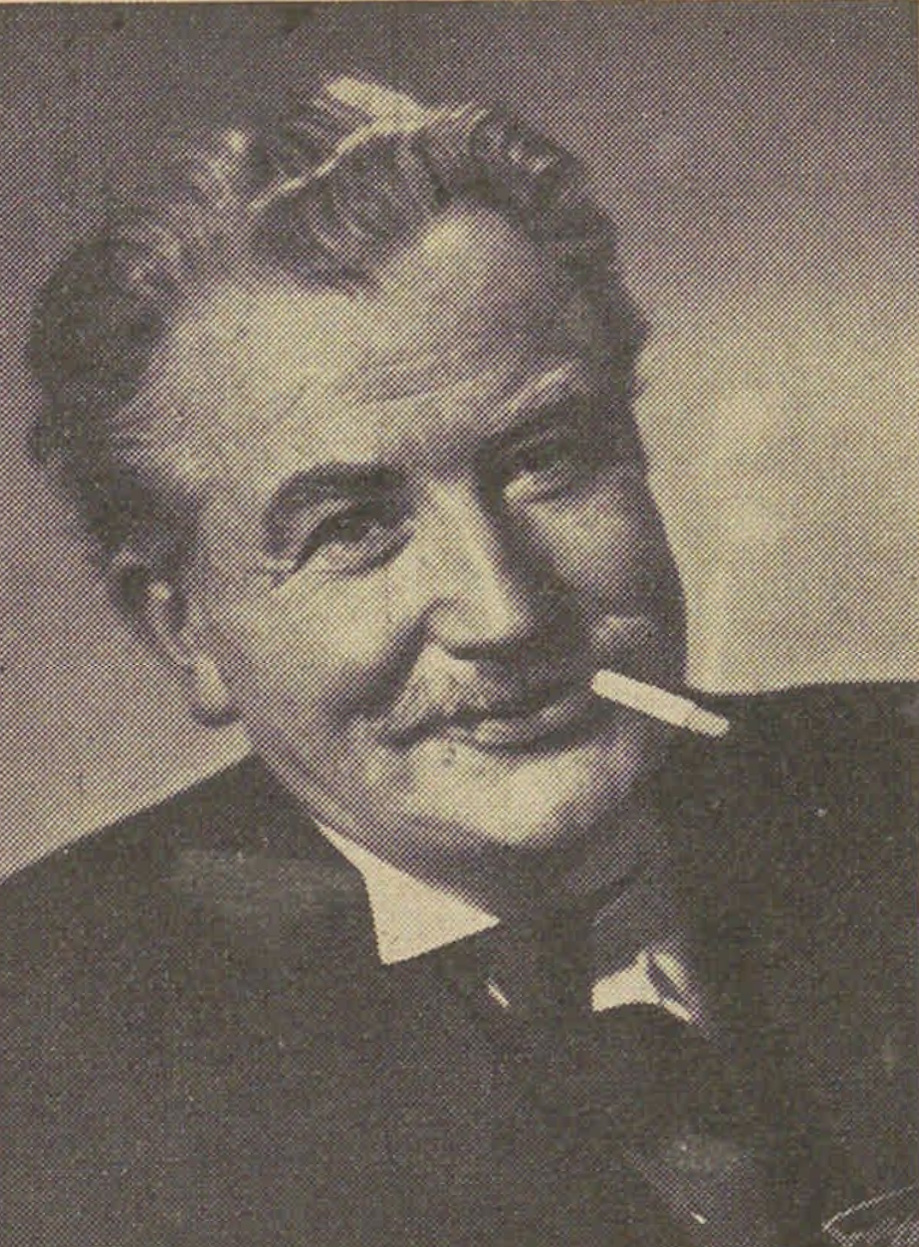
- Bech c. 1950

Prime Minister of Luxembourg
- In office 29 December 1953 – 29 March 1958
- Monarch: Charlotte
- Preceded by: Pierre Dupong
- Succeeded by: Pierre Frieden
- In office 16 July 1926 – 5 November 1937
- Monarch: Charlotte
- Preceded by: Pierre Prüm
- Succeeded by: Pierre Dupong

Personal details
- Born: 17 February 1887 Diekirch, Luxembourg
- Died: 8 March 1975 (aged 88) Luxembourg, Luxembourg
- Party: Right (1914–1944); Christian Social People's (1944–1975)

Joseph Marie Bech (17 February 1887 – 8 March 1975) was a Luxembourgish politician and lawyer. He was the prime minister of Luxembourg, serving for eleven years, from 16 July 1926 to 5 November 1937. He returned to the position after World War II, and served for another four years, from 29 December 1953 until 29 March 1958. The 1982–1983 academic year at the College of Europe was named in his honour.

== Career ==
Bech studied law at Fribourg and Paris before he received his doctorate in law in 1912, and qualified as a lawyer in 1914. The same year, on 30 June, he was elected to the Luxembourgish Chamber of Deputies for the newly founded Party of the Right, representing the Canton of Grevenmacher.

On 15 April 1921, Bech was appointed to Émile Reuter's cabinet, holding the positions of Director-General for the Interior and Director-General for Education. In 1925, Bech lost those positions, as the Party of the Right was edged out of government by a coalition of the other parties, which formed the government under Pierre Prüm.

When Prüm's coalition collapsed in 1926, Bech became prime minister, as well as Minister for Foreign Affairs, Education and Wine-growing. He was to remain the Foreign and Wine-growing Minister until 1954. His term as prime minister, on the other hand, lasted until 1937, when he resigned over the outcome in the referendum on the Maulkuerfgesetz. At various points, he also held the portfolios of Agriculture, Arts and Sciences, and the Interior.

With the German invasion of Luxembourg on 10 May 1940, most of the government quickly departed Luxembourg City and escaped to France.

It was in Bordeaux that Bech and his family were granted transit visas from the Portuguese consul Aristides de Sousa Mendes, along with the rest of the government and the Grand Ducal Family of Luxembourg, in June 1940. Joseph, along with his wife Georgette, and their children Charles and Betty, followed the Grand Ducal family through Coimbra and Lisbon, settling at Praia das Maçãs after the Grand Ducal family had moved to Cascais. By August, the entire entourage had moved to Monte Estoril, where the Bech stayed at Chalet Posser de Andrade until 26 September 1940, with the exception of Charles, who would stay until 2 October. On 26 September, Georgette and Betty boarded the S.S. Excalibur headed for New York City, along with Prime Minister of Luxembourg Pierre Dupong and his wife Sophie. They arrived on 5 October 1940. Joseph Bech eventually returned to London, where the Luxembourg government-in-exile was officially based.

During World War II, Bech was the Foreign Minister of the Luxembourg government-in-exile in London. In that capacity he signed the London Customs Convention establishing the Benelux Union in 1944.

Bech is considered to be one of the 'Founding Fathers' of the European Union and the European Community. He was one of the participants of the Messina Conference in 1955, which would lead to the Treaty of Rome in 1957.

He was prime minister again from 1953 to 1958, succeeding Pierre Dupong. He remained in the government until 1959 when he became President of the Chamber of Deputies until 1964.

Bech died on 8 March 1975, at the age of 88.

== Honours and awards ==
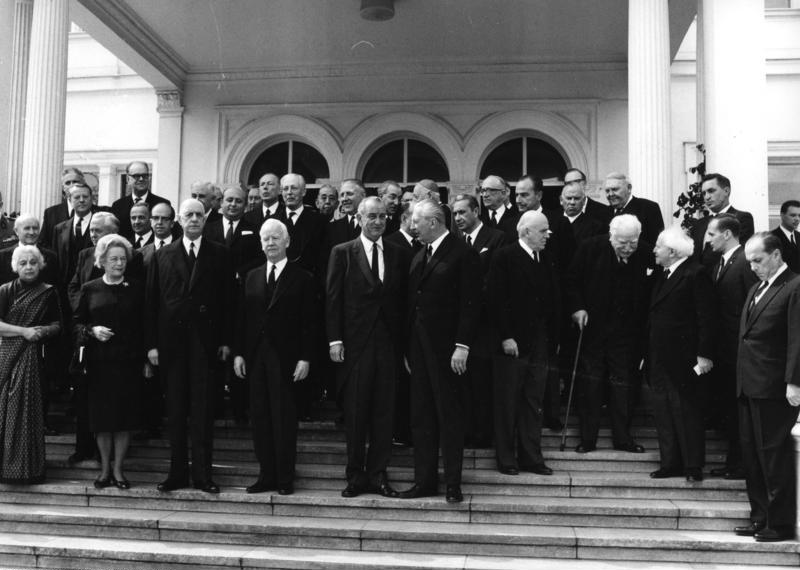
Gathering for the funeral of Konrad Adenauer, Bonn, 1967. Joseph Bech is fourth from right, looking downwards with walking stick.

=== Honours ===
- Grand-Cross of the Order of the Oak Crown
- Grand Cross of the Order of the White Lion (1930)
- Grand Decoration of Honour in Gold with Sash for Services to the Republic of Austria (1955)
- Grand Cross of the Order of Merit of the Federal Republic of Germany (1958)
- Honorary Doctorate by the University of Innsbruck (1968)

=== Awards ===
- Charlemagne Prize (26 May 1960) – "in recognition of his life's work and his high merits for the unification of Europe that began in the old League of Nations and in the European institutions took their purposeful continuation."

Political offices
Preceded by Guillaume Leidenbach	Director-General for Justice; 1923–1925	Succeeded by Norbert Dumont
Preceded by Pierre Prüm	Prime Minister of Luxembourg; 1st time 1926–1937	Succeeded by Pierre Dupong
Preceded by Pierre Prüm	Minister for Foreign Affairs; 1926–1959	Succeeded by Eugène Schaus
Preceded by Pierre Dupong	Minister for Defence; 1951–1953	Succeeded by Pierre Werner
Preceded by Pierre Dupong	Prime Minister of Luxembourg; 2nd time 1953–1958	Succeeded by Pierre Frieden
Preceded by Émile Reuter	President of the Chamber of Deputies; 1959–1964	Succeeded by Victor Bodson
