= South (Chamber of Deputies of Luxembourg constituency) =

Constituency of the Chamber of Deputies, the national legislature of Luxembourg

- Süden; Sud; Süden
- Constituency for the Chamber of Deputies
- Location of South within Luxembourg
- Canton: Capellen; Esch-sur-Alzette
- Population: 247,091 (2024)
- Electorate: 111,884 (2023)
- Area: 442 km^{2} (2018)

Current Constituency
- Created: 1919
- Seats: List: 23 (1989–present); 25 (1984–1989); 24 (1974–1984); 23 (1964–1974); 20 (1945–1964); 22 (1931–1945); 20 (1928–1931); 16 (1919–1928)
- Deputies: List: Barbara Agostino (DP); Marc Baum (DL); Dan Biancalana (LSAP); Taina Bofferding (LSAP); Liz Braz (LSAP); Yves Cruchten (LSAP); Mars Di Bartolomeo (LSAP); Félix Eischen (CSV); Luc Emering (DP); Georges Engel (LSAP); Marc Goergen (PPLU); Gusty Graas (DP); Fernand Kartheiser (ADR); Françoise Kemp (CSV); Nancy Kemp-Arendt (CSV); Fred Keup (ADR); Mandy Minella (DP); Nathalie Morgenthaler (CSV); Meris Šehović (DG); Marc Spautz (CSV); Joëlle Welfring (DG); Michel Wolter (CSV); Laurent Zeimet (CSV)
- Created from: List: Capellen; Esch-sur-Alzette

South (Luxembourgish: Süden; French: Sud; German: Süden) is one of the four multi-member constituencies of the Chamber of Deputies, the national legislature of Luxembourg. The constituency was established in 1919 following the introduction of proportional representation for elections to the Chamber of Deputies. It consists of the cantons of Capellen and Esch-sur-Alzette. The constituency currently elects 23 of the 60 members of the Chamber of Deputies using the open party-list proportional representation electoral system. At the 2023 general election it had 111,884 registered electors.

== Electoral system ==
South currently elects 23 of the 60 members of the Chamber of Deputies using the open party-list proportional representation electoral system. Electors votes for candidates rather than parties and may cast as many votes as the number of deputies to be elected from the constituency. They may vote for an entire party list or individual candidates and may cast up to two votes for an individual candidate. If the party list contains fewer candidates than the number of deputies to be elected, the elector may vote for candidates from other lists as long as their total number of votes does not exceed the number of deputies to be elected. The ballot paper is invalidated if the elector cast more votes than the number of deputies to be elected from the constituency. Split-ticket voting (panachage) is permitted.

The votes received by each party's candidates are aggregated and seats are allocated to each party using the Hagenbach-Bischoff quota.

== Election results ==
=== Summary ===
Election	Communists KPL / ABP			Left DL / NL / RSP / LCR			Socialist Workers LSAP / LAP / SP			Greens DG / GLEI-GAP / GAP			Democrats DP / GD / GPD / RLP RSP / RP / RL			Christian Social People CSV / RP			Alternative Democratic Reform ADR / 5/6		
Election	Votes	%	Seats	Votes	%	Seats	Votes	%	Seats	Votes	%	Seats	Votes	%	Seats	Votes	%	Seats	Votes	%	Seats
2023	17,715	0.93%	0	82,914	4.35%	1	467,088	24.53%	6	134,590	7.07%	2	268,591	14.11%	4	529,283	27.80%	7	199,903	10.50%	2
2018	32,338	1.78%	0	108,193	5.96%	1	403,460	22.23%	6	266,445	14.68%	3	214,216	11.80%	3	488,471	26.91%	7	159,223	8.77%	2
2013	40,123	2.40%	0	95,819	5.73%	1	421,519	25.20%	7	163,641	9.78%	2	213,182	12.75%	3	539,306	32.24%	8	125,826	7.52%	2
2009	33,553	2.17%	0	63,965	4.13%	1	436,233	28.16%	7	158,046	10.20%	2	156,646	10.11%	2	551,771	35.62%	9	122,597	7.91%	2
2004	26,942	1.67%	0	36,684	2.28%	0	519,227	32.27%	8	164,798	10.24%	2	152,758	9.49%	2	572,888	35.60%	9	135,814	8.44%	2
1999				76,174	4.98%	1	454,940	29.77%	7	133,980	8.77%	2	234,772	15.36%	4	462,998	30.30%	7	145,886	9.55%	2
1994	43,189	2.77%	0	25,940	1.67%	0	520,970	33.47%	9	158,991	10.21%	2	179,818	11.55%	3	455,400	29.25%	8	110,908	7.12%	1
1989	115,839	7.30%	1	8,229	0.52%	0	535,962	33.78%	9	77,441	4.88%	1	148,991	9.39%	2	489,316	30.84%	8	101,068	6.37%	1
1984	124,216	7.29%	2	4,047	0.24%	0	703,259	41.29%	11	96,774	5.68%	1	199,874	11.73%	3	543,513	31.91%	8			
1979	143,146	8.98%	2	4,468	0.28%	0	482,953	30.28%	8				245,261	15.38%	4	486,322	30.49%	8			
1974	249,823	15.83%	4	8,285	0.52%	0	554,682	35.14%	9				213,664	13.54%	3	401,606	25.44%	6			
1968	304,487	22.00%	5				495,690	35.82%	9				139,350	10.07%	2	440,124	31.80%	7			
1964	241,293	17.02%	4				593,103	41.84%	10				75,577	5.33%	1	421,954	29.77%	7			
1959	188,282	15.32%	3				493,911	40.18%	8				126,001	10.25%	2	405,185	32.96%	7			
1954	177,747	15.10%	3				470,845	40.00%	8				56,214	4.78%	1	430,297	36.56%	8			
1948	193,320	18.31%	4				459,867	43.57%	9				69,091	6.55%	1	333,282	31.57%	6			
1945	227,619	20.73%	4				335,745	30.57%	6				109,156	9.94%	2	389,324	35.45%	8			
1934	70,940	7.27%	1				404,729	41.49%	10				141,695	14.52%	3	331,728	34.00%	8			
1931*	4,543	5.54%	0				35,944	43.83%	1				10,883	13.27%	0	30,637	37.36%	1			
1928							352,970	48.21%	10				67,791	9.26%	2	262,909	35.91%	7			
1925	15,443	3.11%	0				172,321	34.71%	6				82,017	16.52%	3	159,053	32.04%	6			
1919							118,975	25.16%	4				88,852	18.79%	3	173,739	36.74%	7			

* partial election

=== Detailed ===
==== 2020s ====
===== 2023 =====
Results of the 2023 general election held on 8 October 2023:

Party		Votes	%	Seats
Christian Social People's Party	CSV	529,283	27.80%	7
Luxembourg Socialist Workers' Party	LSAP	467,088	24.53%	6
Democratic Party	DP	268,591	14.11%	4
Alternative Democratic Reform Party	ADR	199,903	10.50%	2
The Greens	DG	134,590	7.07%	2
Pirate Party Luxembourg	PPLU	131,708	6.92%	1
The Left	DL	82,914	4.35%	1
Focus	FOK	41,966	2.20%	0
Communist Party of Luxembourg	KPL	17,715	0.93%	0
Liberty – Freedom!	LF	16,736	0.88%	0
The Conservatives	DK	7,126	0.37%	0
Volt Luxembourg	VOLT	6,449	0.34%	0
Total		1,904,069	100.00%	23
Valid votes		89,832		
Blank votes		3,748	3.81%	
Rejected votes – other		4,747	4.83%	
Total polled		98,327	87.88%	
Registered electors		111,884		

The following candidates were elected: Jean Asselborn (LSAP), 33,398 votes; Marc Baum (DL), 8,664 votes; Dan Biancalana (LSAP), 24,435 votes; Taina Bofferding (LSAP), 30,912 votes; Liz Braz (LSAP), 24,284 votes; Mars Di Bartolomeo (LSAP), 24,663 votes; Félix Eischen (CSV), 26,542 votes; Luc Emering (DP), 11,833 votes; Georges Engel (LSAP), 24,503 votes; Marc Goergen (PPLU), 12,856 votes; Gusty Graas (DP), 11,943 votes; Max Hahn (DP), 19,477 votes; Fernand Kartheiser (ADR), 13,581 votes; Nancy Kemp-Arendt (CSV), 26,145 votes; Fred Keup (ADR), 14,763 votes; Claude Meisch (DP), 17,001 votes; Georges Mischo (CSV), 30,388 votes; Gilles Roth (CSV), 31,451 votes; Meris Šehović (DG), 8,336 votes; Marc Spautz (CSV), 26,053 votes; Joëlle Welfring (DG), 13,014 votes; Michel Wolter (CSV), 26,922 votes; and Laurent Zeimet (CSV), 24,128 votes.

==== 2010s ====
===== 2018 =====
Results of the 2018 general election held on 14 October 2018:

Party		Votes	%	Seats
Christian Social People's Party	CSV	488,471	26.91%	7
Luxembourg Socialist Workers' Party	LSAP	403,460	22.23%	6
The Greens	DG	266,445	14.68%	3
Democratic Party	DP	214,216	11.80%	3
Alternative Democratic Reform Party	ADR	159,223	8.77%	2
Pirate Party Luxembourg	PPLU	126,829	6.99%	1
The Left	DL	108,193	5.96%	1
Communist Party of Luxembourg	KPL	32,338	1.78%	0
The Conservatives	DK	9,516	0.52%	0
Democracy		6,371	0.35%	0
Total		1,815,062	100.00%	23
Valid votes		85,275		
Blank votes		3,197	3.45%	
Rejected votes – other		4,313	4.65%	
Total polled		92,785	90.01%	
Registered electors		103,083		

The following candidates were elected: Jean Asselborn (LSAP), 40,283 votes; Marc Baum (DL), 10,525 votes; Dan Biancalana (LSAP), 20,601 votes; Alex Bodry (LSAP), 20,599 votes; Félix Braz (DG), 25,124 votes; Mars Di Bartolomeo (LSAP), 27,310 votes; Félix Eischen (CSV), 25,892 votes; Georges Engel (LSAP), 19,204 votes; Gaston Gibéryen (ADR), 18,370 votes; Marc Goergen (PPLU), 9,818 votes; Pierre Gramegna (DP), 18,383 votes; Max Hahn (DP), 11,228 votes; Jean-Marie Halsdorf (CSV), 23,853 votes; Fernand Kartheiser (ADR), 10,355 votes; Nancy Kemp-Arendt (CSV), 23,802 votes; Dan Kersch (LSAP), 21,441 votes; Josée Lorsché (DG), 17,323 votes; Claude Meisch (DP), 15,527 votes; Georges Mischo (CSV), 25,387 votes; Gilles Roth (CSV), 23,846 votes; Marc Spautz (CSV), 28,685 votes; Roberto Traversini (DG), 19,136 votes; and Michel Wolter (CSV), 24,068 votes.

===== 2013 =====
Results of the 2013 general election held on 20 October 2013:

Party		Votes	%	Seats
Christian Social People's Party	CSV	539,306	32.24%	8
Luxembourg Socialist Workers' Party	LSAP	421,519	25.20%	7
Democratic Party	DP	213,182	12.75%	3
The Greens	DG	163,641	9.78%	2
Alternative Democratic Reform Party	ADR	125,826	7.52%	2
The Left	DL	95,819	5.73%	1
Pirate Party Luxembourg	PPLU	50,676	3.03%	0
Communist Party of Luxembourg	KPL	40,123	2.40%	0
Party for Full Democracy	PID	22,571	1.35%	0
Total		1,672,663	100.00%	23
Valid votes		81,294		
Blank votes		2,521	2.88%	
Rejected votes – other		3,759	4.29%	
Total polled		87,574	91.80%	
Registered electors		95,397		

The following candidates were elected: Sylvie Andrich-Duval (CSV), 24,269 votes; Jean Asselborn (LSAP), 38,257 votes; Eugène Berger (DP), 12,549 votes; Alex Bodry (LSAP), 24,372 votes; Félix Braz (DG), 19,782 votes; Yves Cruchten (LSAP), 18,205 votes; Mars Di Bartolomeo (LSAP), 28,067 votes; Félix Eischen (CSV), 26,985 votes; Georges Engel (LSAP), 19,814 votes; Gaston Gibéryen (ADR), 16,518 votes; Gusty Graas (DP), 10,265 votes; Jean-Marie Halsdorf (CSV), 27,215 votes; Jean-Claude Juncker (CSV), 55,968 votes; Fernand Kartheiser (ADR), 8,531 votes; Nancy Kemp-Arendt (CSV), 24,594 votes; Dan Kersch (LSAP), 21,042 votes; Josée Lorsché (DG), 11,719 votes; Claude Meisch (DP), 22,300 votes; Lydia Mutsch (LSAP), 24,057 votes; Gilles Roth (CSV), 26,585 votes; Marc Spautz (CSV), 28,052 votes; Serge Urbany (DL), 8,830 votes; and Michel Wolter (CSV), 24,828 votes.

==== 2000s ====
===== 2009 =====
Results of the 2009 general election held on 7 June 2009:

Party		Votes	%	Seats
Christian Social People's Party	CSV	551,771	35.62%	9
Luxembourg Socialist Workers' Party	LSAP	436,233	28.16%	7
The Greens	DG	158,046	10.20%	2
Democratic Party	DP	156,646	10.11%	2
Alternative Democratic Reform Party	ADR	122,597	7.91%	2
The Left	DL	63,965	4.13%	1
Communist Party of Luxembourg	KPL	33,553	2.17%	0
Citizens' List		26,281	1.70%	0
Total		1,549,092	100.00%	23
Valid votes		76,449		
Blank votes		2,724	3.32%	
Rejected votes – other		2,924	3.56%	
Total polled		82,097	91.29%	
Registered electors		89,928		

The following candidates were elected: Jean Asselborn (LSAP), 42,797 votes; Eugène Berger (DP), 8,566 votes; François Biltgen (CSV), 38,963 votes; Alex Bodry (LSAP), 31,167 votes; Félix Braz (DG), 17,660 votes; Claudia Dall'Agnol (LSAP), 18,561 votes; Mars Di Bartolomeo (LSAP), 37,743 votes; Christine Doerner (CSV), 23,352 votes; Félix Eischen (CSV), 26,136 votes; Lydie Err (LSAP), 21,378 votes; Gaston Gibéryen (ADR), 17,237 votes; Tania Gibéryen (ADR), 6,759 votes; Jean-Marie Halsdorf (CSV), 32,237 votes; André Hoffmann (DL), 10,770 votes; Jean Huss (DG), 14,279 votes; Jean-Claude Juncker (CSV), 67,082 votes; Nancy Kemp-Arendt (CSV), 26,285 votes; Lucien Lux (LSAP), 22,297 votes; Claude Meisch (DP), 22,402 votes; Lydia Mutsch (LSAP), 26,549 votes; Gilles Roth (CSV), 23,636 votes; Marc Spautz (CSV), 24,465 votes; and Michel Wolter (CSV), 28,622 votes.

===== 2004 =====
Results of the 2004 general election held on 13 June 2004:

Party		Votes	%	Seats
Christian Social People's Party	CSV	572,888	35.60%	9
Luxembourg Socialist Workers' Party	LSAP	519,227	32.27%	8
The Greens	DG	164,798	10.24%	2
Democratic Party	DP	152,758	9.49%	2
Alternative Democratic Reform Party	ADR	135,814	8.44%	2
The Left	DL	36,684	2.28%	0
Communist Party of Luxembourg	KPL	26,942	1.67%	0
Total		1,609,111	100.00%	23
Valid votes		77,491		
Blank votes		2,401	2.92%	
Rejected votes – other		2,320	2.82%	
Total polled		82,212	92.28%	
Registered electors		89,085		

The following candidates were elected: Jean Asselborn (LSAP), 36,443 votes; François Biltgen (CSV), 47,021 votes; Alex Bodry (LSAP), 36,030 votes; John Castegnaro (LSAP), 31,783 votes; Mars Di Bartolomeo (LSAP), 40,870 votes; Lydie Err (LSAP), 22,473 votes; Gaston Gibéryen (ADR), 16,284 votes; Marcel Glesener (CSV), 24,251 votes; Henri Grethen (DP), 15,539 votes; Jean-Marie Halsdorf (CSV), 30,378 votes; Norbert Haupert (CSV), 24,080 votes; Jean Huss (DG), 18,055 votes; Aly Jaerling (ADR), 8,039 votes; Jean-Claude Juncker (CSV), 65,378 votes; Lucien Lux (LSAP), 32,022 votes; Claude Meisch (DP), 11,993 votes; Lydia Mutsch (LSAP), 28,953 votes; Marc Spautz (CSV), 25,497 votes; Nelly Stein (CSV), 24,454 votes; Fred Sunnen (CSV), 24,725 votes; Claude Turmes (DG), 11,534 votes; Michel Wolter (CSV), 28,748 votes; and Marc Zanussi (LSAP), 28,015 votes.

==== 1990s ====
===== 1999 =====
Results of the 1999 general election held on 13 June 1999:

Party		Votes	%	Seats
Christian Social People's Party	CSV	462,998	30.30%	7
Luxembourg Socialist Workers' Party	LSAP	454,940	29.77%	7
Democratic Party	DP	234,772	15.36%	4
Action Committee for Democracy and Pensions Justice	ADR	145,886	9.55%	2
The Greens	DG	133,980	8.77%	2
The Left	DL	76,174	4.98%	1
Green and Liberal Alliance	GaL	14,117	0.92%	0
Party of the Third Age		5,382	0.35%	0
Total		1,528,249	100.00%	23
Valid votes		73,547		
Blank votes		3,193	4.05%	
Rejected votes – other		2,180	2.76%	
Total polled		78,920	85.54%	
Registered electors		92,259		

The following candidates were elected: Jean Asselborn (LSAP), 28,401 votes; Eugène Berger (DP), 12,763 votes; François Biltgen (CSV), 22,373 votes; Alex Bodry (LSAP), 36,357 votes; Mars Di Bartolomeo (LSAP), 32,266 votes; Lydie Err (LSAP), 21,323 votes; Robert Garcia (DG), 9,757 votes; Gaston Gibéryen (ADR), 14,605 votes; Marcel Glesener (CSV), 22,392 votes; Gusty Graas (DP), 11,454 votes; Henri Grethen (DP), 17,921 votes; Jean-Marie Halsdorf (CSV), 20,732 votes; André Hoffmann (DL), 8,099 votes; Jean Huss (DG), 12,084 votes; Aly Jaerling (ADR), 7,760 votes; Jean-Claude Juncker (CSV), 46,430 votes; Lucien Lux (LSAP), 27,329 votes; Jacques Poos (LSAP), 22,139 votes; John Schummer (DP), 12,045 votes; Jean Spautz (CSV), 30,306 votes; Nelly Stein (CSV), 20,984 votes; Michel Wolter (CSV), 23,283 votes; and Marc Zanussi (LSAP), 22,860 votes.

===== 1994 =====
Results of the 1994 general election held on 12 June 1994:

Party		Votes	%	Seats
Luxembourg Socialist Workers' Party	LSAP	520,970	33.47%	9
Christian Social People's Party	CSV	455,400	29.25%	8
Democratic Party	DP	179,818	11.55%	3
The Greens	GLEI-GAP	158,991	10.21%	2
Action Committee for Democracy and Pensions Justice	ADR	110,908	7.12%	1
National Movement	NB	50,345	3.23%	0
Communist Party of Luxembourg	KPL	43,189	2.77%	0
New Left	NL	25,940	1.67%	0
Neutral and Independent Human Rights Party	NOMP	9,863	0.63%	0
Luxembourg Association for an Improved Future	ALFA	1,235	0.08%	0
Total		1,556,659	100.00%	23
Valid votes		73,573		
Blank votes		3,580	4.53%	
Rejected votes – other		1,880	2.38%	
Total polled		79,033	88.99%	
Registered electors		88,807		

The following candidates were elected: Jean Asselborn (LSAP), 27,483 votes; Eugène Berger (DP), 8,676 votes; Alex Bodry (LSAP), 31,201 votes; François Colling (CSV), 25,189 votes; Mars Di Bartolomeo (LSAP), 28,363 votes; Lydie Err (LSAP), 22,836 votes; Robert Garcia (GLEI-GAP), 9,235 votes; Gaston Gibéryen (ADR), 11,011 votes; Marcel Glesener (CSV), 21,484 votes; Henri Grethen (DP), 14,763 votes; Jean Huss (GLEI-GAP), 13,527 votes; Jean-Claude Juncker (CSV), 39,207 votes; Ady Jung (CSV), 20,999 votes; Johny Lahure (LSAP), 29,017 votes; Lucien Lux (LSAP), 26,184 votes; Lydia Mutsch (LSAP), 21,795 votes; Jacques Poos (LSAP), 31,970 votes; Viviane Reding (CSV), 23,459 votes; John Schummer (DP), 10,237 votes; Jean Spautz (CSV), 31,218 votes; Nelly Stein (CSV), 20,995 votes; Michel Wolter (CSV), 24,257 votes; and Marc Zanussi (LSAP), 23,241 votes.

==== 1980s ====
===== 1989 =====
Results of the 1989 general election held on 18 June 1989:

Party		Votes	%	Seats
Luxembourg Socialist Workers' Party	LSAP	535,962	33.78%	9
Christian Social People's Party	CSV	489,316	30.84%	8
Democratic Party	DP	148,991	9.39%	2
Communist Party of Luxembourg	KPL	115,839	7.30%	1
Action Committee 5/6 Pensions for Everyone	5/6	101,068	6.37%	1
Green Alternative Party	GAP	77,441	4.88%	1
Green List Ecological Initiative	GLEI	60,336	3.80%	1
National Movement	NB	48,556	3.06%	0
RSP Against Racism and Fascism	RSP	8,229	0.52%	0
Citizens Party		871	0.05%	0
Total		1,586,609	100.00%	23
Valid votes		73,740		
Blank votes		2,760	3.53%	
Rejected votes – other		1,675	2.14%	
Total polled		78,175	88.21%	
Registered electors		88,628		

The following candidates were elected: Jean Asselborn (LSAP), 24,546 votes; Josy Barthel (DP), 12,234 votes; Alex Bodry (LSAP), 28,501 votes; Joseph Brebsom (LSAP), 23,882 votes; François Colling (CSV), 27,011 votes; Mars Di Bartolomeo (LSAP), 23,414 votes; Camille Dimmer (CSV), 22,441 votes; Lydie Err (LSAP), 24,649 votes; Gaston Gibéryen (5/6), 8,566 votes; Henri Grethen (DP), 9,350 votes; Jean Huss (GAP), 8,538 votes; Jean-Claude Juncker (CSV), 34,932 votes; Johny Lahure (LSAP), 28,863 votes; Marcelle Lentz-Cornette (CSV), 23,053 votes; Lucien Lux (LSAP), 24,714 votes; Jim Meisch (GLEI), 4,134 votes; Jacques Poos (LSAP), 37,917 votes; René Putzeys (CSV), 24,288 votes; Viviane Reding (CSV), 25,567 votes; Jean Regenwetter (LSAP), 23,289 votes; Jean Spautz (CSV), 34,637 votes; René Urbany (KPL), 13,443 votes; and Michel Wolter (CSV), 24,325 votes.

===== 1984 =====
Results of the 1984 general election held on 17 June 1984:

Party		Votes	%	Seats
Luxembourg Socialist Workers' Party	LSAP	703,259	41.29%	11
Christian Social People's Party	CSV	543,513	31.91%	8
Democratic Party	DP	199,874	11.73%	3
Communist Party of Luxembourg	KPL	124,216	7.29%	2
Green Alternative Party	GAP	96,774	5.68%	1
Independent Socialist Party	PSI	31,634	1.86%	0
Revolutionary Communist League	LCR	4,047	0.24%	0
Total		1,703,317	100.00%	25
Valid votes		73,086		
Blank votes		3,103	3.99%	
Rejected votes – other		1,543	1.99%	
Total polled		77,732	89.68%	
Registered electors		86,679		

The following candidates were elected: Jean Asselborn (LSAP), 28,349 votes; Josy Barthel (DP), 14,790 votes; Bernard Berg (LSAP), 30,998 votes; Nicolas Birtz (LSAP), 28,615 votes; Aloyse Bisdorff (KPL), 7,374 votes; Alex Bodry (LSAP), 29,004 votes; Joseph Brebsom (LSAP), 30,517 votes; François Colling (CSV), 27,676 votes; Camille Dimmer (CSV), 22,289 votes; Willy Dondelinger (LSAP), 28,202 votes; Nicolas Eickmann (LSAP), 28,959 votes; Lydie Err (LSAP), 29,697 votes; Jean-Pierre Glesener (CSV), 23,056 votes; Henri Grethen (DP), 10,032 votes;Jean Huss (GAP), 5,067 votes; Jean-Claude Juncker (CSV), 29,382 votes; Marcelle Lentz-Cornette (CSV), 24,193 votes; René Mart (DP), 11,323 votes; Jacques Poos (LSAP), 35,577 votes; Viviane Reding (CSV), 26,447 votes; Jean Regenwetter (LSAP), 30,265 votes; Jean Spautz (CSV), 32,561 votes; Maurice Thoss (LSAP), 29,073 votes; René Urbany (KPL), 10,257 votes; and Michel Wolter (CSV), 23,135 votes.

==== 1970s ====
===== 1979 =====
Results of the 1979 general election held on 10 June 1979:

Party		Votes	%	Seats
Christian Social People's Party	CSV	486,322	30.49%	8
Luxembourg Socialist Workers' Party	LSAP	482,953	30.28%	8
Democratic Party	DP	245,261	15.38%	4
Communist Party of Luxembourg	KPL	143,146	8.98%	2
Enrôlés de Force	EDF	112,057	7.03%	1
Social Democratic Party	SDP	104,799	6.57%	1
Alternative List - Worth it		15,843	0.99%	0
Revolutionary Communist League	LCR	4,468	0.28%	0
Total		1,594,849	100.00%	24
Valid votes		70,145		
Blank votes		3,161	4.17%	
Rejected votes – other		2,553	3.37%	
Total polled		75,859	89.79%	
Registered electors		84,486		

The following candidates were elected: Josy Barthel (DP), 17,019 votes; Albert Berchem (DP), 11,967 votes; Bernard Berg (LSAP), 23,618 votes; Aloyse Bisdorff (KPL), 7,477 votes; Joseph Brebsom (LSAP), 21,365 votes; René Bürger (CSV), 22,655 votes; François Colling (CSV), 27,118 votes; Willy Dondelinger (LSAP), 20,947 votes; Joseph Eyschen (DP), 11,687 votes; Jean-Pierre Glesener (CSV), 22,723 votes; Roger Krier (LSAP), 21,318 votes; Marcelle Lentz-Cornette (CSV), 21,596 votes; Joseph Lucius (CSV), 20,931 votes; Astrid Lulling (SDP), 13,646 votes; René Mart (DP), 13,472 votes; Jacques Poos (LSAP), 25,279 votes; Viviane Reding (CSV), 22,971 votes; Jean Regenwetter (LSAP), 21,595 votes; Lydie Schmit (LSAP), 23,345 votes; Jean Spautz (CSV), 24,740 votes; Maurice Thoss (LSAP), 21,990 votes; René Urbany (KPL), 9,920 votes; Jos Weirich (EDF), 7,160 votes; and Jean Wolter (CSV), 25,018 votes.

===== 1974 =====
Results of the 1974 general election held on 26 May 1974:

Party		Votes	%	Seats
Luxembourg Socialist Workers' Party	LSAP	554,682	35.14%	9
Christian Social People's Party	CSV	401,606	25.44%	6
Communist Party of Luxembourg	KPL	249,823	15.83%	4
Democratic Party	DP	213,664	13.54%	3
Social Democratic Party	SDP	150,335	9.52%	2
Revolutionary Communist League	LCR	8,285	0.52%	0
Total		1,578,395	100.00%	24
Valid votes		70,100		
Blank votes		1,674	2.25%	
Rejected votes – other		2,505	3.37%	
Total polled		74,279	91.50%	
Registered electors		81,176		

The following candidates were elected: Albert Berchem (DP), 11,535 votes; Bernard Berg (LSAP), 27,547 votes; Marthe Bigelbach-Fohrmann (LSAP), 23,331 votes; Nicolas Birtz (LSAP), 24,426 votes; Joseph Brebsom (LSAP), 24,192 votes; René Bürger (CSV), 20,389 votes; Jean Dupong (CSV), 19,934 votes; Marcel Flammang (KPL), 11,986 votes; Jean-Pierre Glesener (CSV), 19,363 votes; Joseph Grandgenet (KPL), 14,280 votes; Joseph Haupert (LSAP), 24,658 votes; Marcel Knauf (LSAP), 24,543 votes; Roger Krier (LSAP), 25,581 votes; Joseph Lucius (CSV), 19,127 votes; Astrid Lulling (SDP), 17,097 votes; Marcel Mart (DP), 19,311 votes; René Mart (DP), 12,029 votes; Dominique Meis (KPL), 11,687 votes; Jacques Poos (LSAP), 25,942 votes; Roger Schleimer (SDP), 9,581 votes; Jean Spautz (CSV), 22,881 votes; Arthur Useldinger (KPL), 16,706 votes; Raymond Vouel (LSAP), 27,072 votes; and Jean Wolter (CSV), 20,814 votes.

==== 1960s ====
===== 1968 =====
Results of the 1968 general election held on 15 December 1968:

Party		Votes	%	Seats
Luxembourg Socialist Workers' Party	LSAP	495,690	35.82%	9
Christian Social People's Party	CSV	440,124	31.80%	7
Communist Party of Luxembourg	KPL	304,487	22.00%	5
Democratic Party	DP	139,350	10.07%	2
National Solidarity		4,250	0.31%	0
Total		1,383,901	100.00%	23
Valid votes		64,017		
Blank votes		2,283	3.35%	
Rejected votes – other		1,907	2.80%	
Total polled		68,207	90.16%	
Registered electors		75,650		

The following candidates were elected: Albert Berchem (DP), 8,580 votes; Bernard Berg (LSAP), 21,542 votes; René Bürger (CSV), 21,432 votes; Jean Dupong (CSV), 25,188 votes; Romain Fandel (LSAP), 24,972 votes; Joseph Flammang (KPL), 13,730 votes; Jean Fohrmann (LSAP), 23,428 votes; Jean-Pierre Glesener (CSV), 21,644 votes; Joseph Grandgenet (KPL), 15,898 votes; René Hartmann (LSAP), 21,453 votes; Antoine Krier (LSAP), 23,618 votes; Roger Krier (LSAP), 21,492 votes; Joseph Lucius (CSV), 20,893 votes; Astrid Lulling (LSAP), 24,682 votes; René Mart (DP), 7,132 votes; Dominique Meis (KPL), 14,185 votes; Pierre Rumé (CSV), 20,984 votes; Roger Schleimer (LSAP), 21,648 votes; Jean Spautz (CSV), 24,846 votes; Dominique Urbany (KPL), 16,008 votes; Arthur Useldinger (KPL), 17,067 votes; Raymond Vouel (LSAP), 25,381 votes; and Jean Wolter (CSV), 20,873 votes.

===== 1964 =====
Results of the 1964 general election held on 7 June 1964:

Party		Votes	%	Seats
Luxembourg Socialist Workers' Party	LSAP	593,103	41.84%	10
Christian Social People's Party	CSV	421,954	29.77%	7
Communist Party of Luxembourg	KPL	241,293	17.02%	4
Popular Independent Movement	MIP	85,630	6.04%	1
Democratic Party	DP	75,577	5.33%	1
Total		1,417,557	100.00%	23
Valid votes		64,778		
Blank votes		2,261	3.29%	
Rejected votes – other		1,723	2.51%	
Total polled		68,762	91.60%	
Registered electors		75,066		

The following candidates were elected: Albert Berchem (DP), 5,437 votes; Nicolas Biever (LSAP), 30,407 votes; Edmond Chlecq (MIP), 5,218 votes; Émile Colling (CSV), 22,346 votes; Jean Dupong (CSV), 19,699 votes; Romain Fandel (LSAP), 28,654 votes; Jean Fohrmann (LSAP), 29,393 votes; Jean Gallion (LSAP), 27,401 votes; Pierre Gansen (LSAP), 26,778 votes; Jean-Pierre Glesener (CSV), 19,284 votes; Joseph Grandgenet (KPL), 12,049 votes; Jacques Hoffmann (KPL), 10,563 votes; Théophile Kirsch (LSAP), 25,265 votes; Marcel Knauf (LSAP), 25,763 votes; Antoine Krier (LSAP), 29,129 votes; Joseph Lucius (CSV), 19,730 votes; Pierre Schockmel (CSV), 19,672 votes; Jules Schreiner (LSAP), 25,621 votes; Jean Spautz (CSV), 22,041 votes; Dominique Steichen (LSAP), 26,904 votes; Dominique Urbany (KPL), 12,708 votes; Arthur Useldinger (KPL), 13,248 votes; and Charles Wirtgen (CSV), 19,188 votes.

==== 1950s ====
===== 1959 =====
Results of the 1959 general election held on 1 February 1959:

Party		Votes	%	Seats
Luxembourg Socialist Workers' Party	LSAP	493,911	40.18%	8
Christian Social People's Party	CSV	405,185	32.96%	7
Communist Party of Luxembourg	KPL	188,282	15.32%	3
Democratic Party	DP	126,001	10.25%	2
National Solidarity		15,821	1.29%	0
Total		1,229,200	100.00%	20
Valid votes		64,330		
Rejected votes		3,081	4.57%	
Total polled		67,411	93.41%	
Registered electors		72,166		

The following candidates were elected: Albert Berchem (DP), 8,102 votes; Nicolas Biever (LSAP), 31,781 votes; François Cigrang (DP), 8,294 votes; Émile Colling (CSV), 26,242 votes; Jean Dupong (CSV), 24,275 votes; Romain Fandel (LSAP), 27,314 votes; Jean Fohrmann (LSAP), 28,921 votes; Jean Gallion (LSAP), 25,191 votes; Pierre Gansen (LSAP), 27,431 votes; Joseph Grandgenet (KPL), 11,206 votes; Jean Kinsch (CSV), 22,050 votes; Antoine Krier (LSAP), 28,070 votes; Joseph Lommel (CSV), 21,911 votes; Joseph Lucius (CSV), 22,160 votes; Denis Netgen (LSAP), 24,717 votes; Pierre Schockmel (CSV), 22,419 votes; Dominique Steichen (LSAP), 26,633 votes; Dominique Urbany (KPL), 11,959 votes; Arthur Useldinger (KPL), 12,435 votes; and Charles Wirtgen (CSV), 21,900 votes.

===== 1954 =====
Results of the 1954 general election held on 30 May 1954:

Party		Votes	%	Seats
Luxembourg Socialist Workers' Party	LSAP	470,845	40.00%	8
Christian Social People's Party	CSV	430,297	36.56%	8
Communist Party of Luxembourg	KPL	177,747	15.10%	3
Democratic Group	GD	56,214	4.78%	1
Independent Party of the Middle Class		41,978	3.57%	0
Total		1,177,081	100.00%	20
Valid votes		61,136		
Rejected votes		3,024	4.71%	
Total polled		64,160	93.55%	
Registered electors		68,584		

The following candidates were elected: Nicolas Biever (LSAP), 28,838 votes; François Cigrang (GD), 4,084 votes; Émile Colling (CSV), 25,920 votes; Jean Dupong (CSV), 25,296 votes; Romain Fandel (LSAP), 26,143 votes; Jean Fohrmann (LSAP), 27,636 votes; Pierre Gansen (LSAP), 26,644 votes; Joseph Grandgenet (KPL), 10,237 votes; Jean Kinsch (CSV), 22,808 votes; Antoine Krier (LSAP), 25,528 votes; Joseph Lommel (CSV), 23,474 votes; Nicolas Margue (CSV), 23,454 votes; Denis Netgen (LSAP), 24,481 votes; Michel Rasquin (LSAP), 26,839 votes; Jean-Baptiste Rock (CSV), 22,855 votes; Dominique Steichen (LSAP), 23,769 votes; Dominique Urbany (KPL), 10,348 votes; Arthur Useldinger (KPL), 11,090 votes; Alex Werné (CSV), 21,992 votes; and Charles Wirtgen (CSV), 22,928 votes.

==== 1940s ====
===== 1948 =====
Results of the 1948 general election held on 6 June 1948:

Party		Votes	%	Seats
Luxembourg Socialist Workers' Party	LSAP	459,867	43.57%	9
Christian Social People's Party	CSV	333,282	31.57%	6
Communist Party of Luxembourg	KPL	193,320	18.31%	4
Patriotic and Democratic Group	GPD	69,091	6.55%	1
Total		1,055,560	100.00%	20
Valid votes		55,106		
Blank votes		1,726	2.97%	
Rejected votes – other		1,250	2.15%	
Total polled		58,082	91.54%	
Registered electors		63,448		

The following candidates were elected: Nicolas Biever (LSAP), 28,202 votes; Victor Bodson (LSAP), 27,887 votes; Mathias Clemens (LSAP), 22,512 votes; Émile Colling (CSV), 20,330 votes; Pierre Dupong (CSV), 23,373 votes; Romain Fandel (LSAP), 23,448 votes; Jean Fohrmann (LSAP), 29,088 votes; Pierre Gansen (LSAP), 26,403 votes; Joseph Grandgenet (KPL), 11,790 votes; Aloyse Hentgen (CSV), 19,205 votes; Antoine Krier (LSAP), 24,724 votes; Nicolas Margue (CSV), 18,103 votes; Nicolas Moes (KPL), 10,576 votes; Denis Netgen (LSAP), 25,223 votes; Alphonse Osch (GPD), 5,976 votes; Michel Rasquin (LSAP), 26,043 votes; Jean-Baptiste Rock (CSV), 19,731 votes; Dominique Urbany (KPL), 12,038 votes; Arthur Useldinger (KPL), 12,976 votes; and Charles Wirtgen (CSV), 18,417 votes.

===== 1945 =====
Results of the 1945 general election held on 21 October 1945:

Party		Votes	%	Seats
Christian Social People's Party	CSV	389,324	35.45%	8
Luxembourg Workers' Party	LAP	335,745	30.57%	6
Communist Party of Luxembourg	KPL	227,619	20.73%	4
Patriotic and Democratic Group	GPD	109,156	9.94%	2
Liberal Party	LP	36,321	3.31%	0
Total		1,098,165	100.00%	20
Valid votes		56,664		
Blank votes		490	0.84%	
Rejected votes – other		1,095	1.88%	
Total polled		58,249		
Registered electors				

The following candidates were elected: Nicolas Biever (LAP), 20,342 votes; Mathias Clemens (LAP), 18,482 votes; Émile Colling (CSV), 22,625 votes; Pierre Dupong (CSV), 28,171 votes; Jean Fohrmann (LAP), 20,977 votes; Ferdinand Frieden (GPD), 7,215 votes; Pierre Gansen (LSAP), 18,196 votes; Joseph Grandgenet (KPL), 13,266 votes; Aloyse Hentgen (CSV), 22,338 votes; Léon Kinsch (CSV), 21,769 votes; Nicolas Kremer (GPD), 6,635 votes; Antoine Krier (LAP), 21,423 votes; Joseph Lommel (CSV), 19,431 votes; Nicolas Margue (CSV), 23,166 votes; Denis Netgen (LAP), 19,221 votes; Jean-Baptiste Rock (CSV), 22,386 votes; Nicolas Schumacher (KPL), 11,939 votes; Dominique Urbany (KPL), 15,649 votes; Arthur Useldinger (KPL), 14,811 votes; and Charles Wirtgen (CSV), 20,416 votes.

==== 1930s ====
===== 1934 =====
Results of the 1934 general election held on 3 June 1934:

Party		Votes	%	Seats
Luxembourg Workers' Party	LAP	404,729	41.49%	10
Party of the Right	RP	331,728	34.00%	8
Radical Liberal Party	RLP	141,695	14.52%	3
Communist Party of Luxembourg	KPL	70,940	7.27%	1
Independents		25,694	2.63%	0
Middle Class Party		793	0.08%	0
Total		975,579	100.00%	22
Valid votes		47,045		
Blank votes		1,141	2.31%	
Rejected votes – other		1,305	2.64%	
Total polled		49,491	92.35%	
Registered electors		53,591		

The following candidates were elected: Jean-Pierre Bausch (LAP), 19,933 votes; Zénon Bernard (KPL), 6,057 votes; Nicolas Biever (LAP), 21,201 votes; René Blum (LAP), 24,165 votes; Victor Bodson (LAP), 19,158 votes; Hubert Clément (LAP), 20,543 votes; Pierre Dupong (RP), 22,401 votes; Pierre Hamer (LAP), 19,441 votes; Aloyse Hentgen (RP), 16,613 votes; Edouard Kirsch (RP), 16,590 votes; Léon Kinsch (RP), 16,389 votes; Adolphe Krieps (LAP), 19,025 votes; Pierre Krier (LAP), 21,031 votes; Charles Krombach (RLP), 8,618 votes; Émile Mark (RLP), 10,617 votes; Denis Netgen (LAP), 19,053 votes; Eugène Reichling (RP), 18,347 votes; Jean-Baptiste Rock (RP), 16,842 votes; Marcel Schintgen (RP), 15,854 votes; Joseph Schroeder (LAP), 18,952 votes; Guillaume Theves (RLP), 11,569 votes; Nicolas Wirtgen (RP), 17,461 votes.

===== 1931 =====
Results of the 1931 general election held on 7 June 1931:

Party		Votes	%	Seats
Luxembourg Workers' Party	LAP	35,944	43.83%	1
Party of the Right	RP	30,637	37.36%	1
Radical Socialist Party	RSP	10,883	13.27%	0
Communist Party of Luxembourg	KPL	4,543	5.54%	0
Total		82,007	100.00%	2
Valid votes		41,156		
Blank votes		1,415	3.16%	
Rejected votes – other		2,275	5.07%	
Total polled		44,846		
Registered electors				

The following candidates were elected: Jean-Pierre Mockel (LAP), 18,814 votes; and Eugène Reichling (RP), 16,336 votes.

==== 1920s ====
===== 1928 =====
Results of the 1928 general election held on 3 June 1928:

Party		Votes	%	Seats
Luxembourg Workers' Party	LAP	352,970	48.21%	10
Party of the Right	RP	262,909	35.91%	7
Radical Party	RP	67,791	9.26%	2
Independent Group	OG	48,492	6.62%	1
Total		732,162	100.00%	20
Valid votes		39,427		
Blank votes		560	1.36%	
Rejected votes – other		1,121	2.73%	
Total polled		41,108	89.62%	
Registered electors		45,871		

The following candidates were elected: Jean-Pierre Bausch (LAP), 16,822 votes; Nicolas Biever (LAP), 20,189 votes; René Blum (LAP), 24,340 votes; Albert Clemang (RP), 8,040 votes; Hubert Clément (LAP), 18,460 votes; Eugène Auguste Collart (RP), 17,565 votes; Eugène Dondelinger (RP), 18,271 votes; Pierre Dupong (RP), 21,908 votes; Pierre Hamer (LAP), 16,424 votes; Edouard Kirsch (RP), 15,247 votes; Adolphe Krieps (LAP), 19,493 votes; Pierre Krier (LAP), 21,067 votes; Hubert Loutsch (OG), 8,593 votes; Émile Mark (RP), 8,721 votes; Valentin Noesen (RP), 13,851 votes; Jacques Thilmany (LAP), 19,688 votes; Albert Wagner (RP), 13,798 votes; Léon Weirich (LAP), 16,997 votes; Victor Wilhelm (LAP), 19,787 votes; and Nicolas Wirtgen (RP), 16,662 votes.

===== 1925 =====
Results of the 1925 general election held on 1 March 1925:

Party		Votes	%	Seats
Luxembourg Workers' Party	LAP	172,321	34.71%	6
Party of the Right	RP	159,053	32.04%	6
Radical Left	RL	82,017	16.52%	3
National Independent Union	ONV	44,383	8.94%	1
Independent Party of the Peasants		23,263	4.69%	0
Party of the Workers and Peasants	ABP	15,443	3.11%	0
Total		496,480	100.00%	16
Valid votes		32,673		
Blank votes		428	1.25%	
Rejected votes – other		1,157	3.38%	
Total polled		34,258		
Registered electors				

The following candidates were elected: Nicolas Biever (LAP), 12,212 votes; René Blum (LAP), 16,476 votes; Albert Clemang (RL), 8,187 votes; Eugène Auguste Collart (RP), 13,320 votes; Eugène Dondelinger (RP), 13,765 votes; Pierre Dupong (RP), 13,476 votes; Aloyse Kayser (RL); 11,005 votes; Edouard Kirsch (RP), 12,264 votes; Adolphe Krieps (LAP), 11,858 votes; Pierre Krier (LAP), 14,312 votes; Hubert Loutsch (ONV), 7,295 votes; Émile Mark (RL), 12,648 votes; Jacques Thilmany (LAP), 12,214 votes; Victor Wilhelm (LAP), 14,866 votes; Albert Wagner (RP), 10,423 votes; and Nicolas Wirtgen (RP), 12,025 votes.

==== 1910s ====
===== 1919 =====
Results of the 1919 general election held on 26 October 1919:

Party		Votes	%	Seats
Party of the Right	RP	173,739	36.74%	7
Socialist Party	SP	118,975	25.16%	4
Radical List	RL	88,852	18.79%	3
Independent People's Party	FV	64,847	13.71%	2
Emile Mark List		14,055	2.97%	0
Independent Workers' Party		11,354	2.40%	0
J Kayser List		1,084	0.23%	0
Total		472,906	100.00%	16
Valid votes				
Blank votes				
Rejected votes – other				
Total polled				
Registered electors				

The following candidates were elected: Alphonse Bervard (RP), 10,898 votes; René Blum (SP), 11,489 votes; Albert Clemang (RL), 8,535 votes; Eugène Dondelinger (RP), 15,753 votes; Pierre Dupong (RP), 15,051 votes; Bernard Herschbach (FV), 7,928 votes; Pierre Kappweiler (FV), 8,227 votes; Aloyse Kayser (RL); 11,505 votes; Edouard Kirsch (RP), 13,260 votes; Adolphe Krieps (SP), 11,152 votes; Pierre Krier (SP), 12,720 votes; Eugène Steichen (RP), 10,909 votes; Joseph Thorn (SP), 9,618 votes; Georges Ulveling (RL), 7,035 votes; Albert Wagner (RP), 10,792 votes; and Nicolas Wirtgen (RP), 13,209 votes.
