= Lucien Lux =

Luxembourgish politician (born 1956)

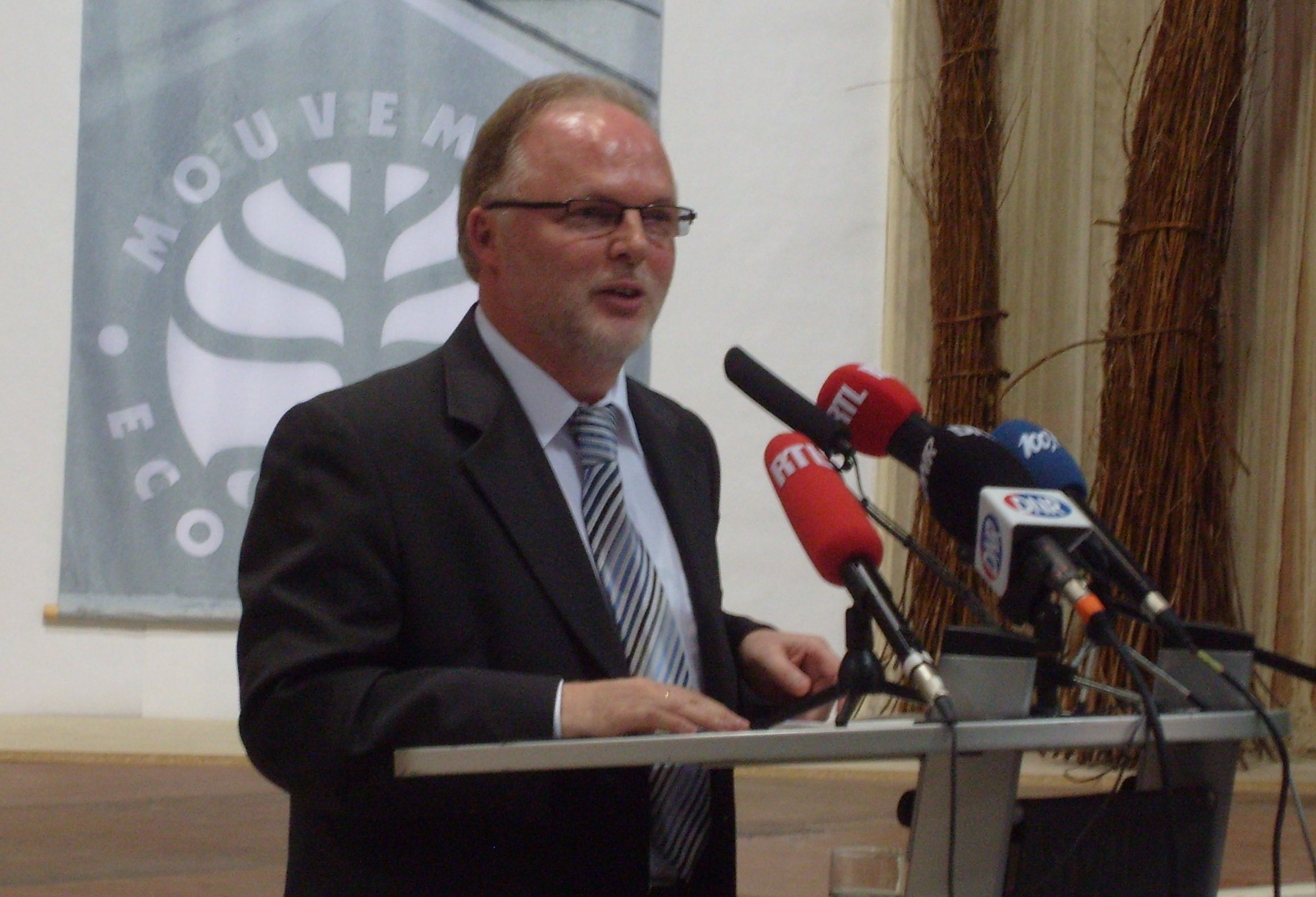
- Lux in 2008

Member of the Council of State
- Incumbent
- Assumed office 2014

Member of the Chamber of Deputies
- In office 1989–2013
- Constituency: South

Minister for the Environment
- In office 2004 – 23 July 2009
- Prime Minister: Jean-Claude Juncker
- Preceded by: Charles Goerens
- Succeeded by: Office abolished

Minister for Transport
- In office 2004 – 23 July 2009
- Prime Minister: Jean-Claude Juncker
- Preceded by: Henri Grethen
- Succeeded by: Office abolished

Mayor of Bettembourg
- In office 1 January 1988 – 2004

Personal details
- Born: 13 September 1956 (age 69) Troisvierges, Luxembourg
- Party: Luxembourg Socialist Workers' Party
- Occupation: Politician, trade unionist

Lucien Lux (born 13 September 1956 in Troisvierges) is a politician and trade unionist from Luxembourg. He was a member of the Chamber of Deputies representing the Luxembourg Socialist Workers' Party from 1989 to 2013. He served as a minister in the first government of prime minister Jean-Claude Juncker, from 2004 until 2009. He later retired from the chamber and was appointed to the Council of State.

In 2023, Lux received the council's first reprimand in its history for breaching privacy policies. The next year in 2024, Luxembourgish authorities started an investigation into Lux for alleged corruption.

== Career ==
He worked for Chemins de Fer Luxembourgeois, and in 1978 joined the Confederation of Independent Trade Unions (OGB-L) as union secretary. Lux was the chairman of the Bettembourg branch of the Luxembourg Socialist Workers' Party (LSAP) from 1986, and he became mayor of Bettembourg on 1 January 1988, which he would hold until his appointment to the government.

The 1989 election saw Lux first enter the Chamber of Deputies, representing the South constituency, after which he stepped down from his position at the OGB-L. He was re-elected in 1994 and in 1999 (in fourth place among LSAP candidates in Sud).

He was elected as Secretary-General of the LSAP in 2002, putting him in charge of the 2004 election. In that election, he placed fourth once again, while the LSAP dislodged the Democratic Party from the governing coalition. As a result, Lux was appointed Minister for the Environment and Minister for Transport after the election, posts which he held until 23 July 2009, when they were abolished. In the 2009 election, Lux was returned to the Chamber, but only fifth amongst LSAP candidates. He did not contest the 2013 election and instead joined the Council of State, the country's de facto upper legislative body, in 2014.

In August 2023, Lux was accused of sharing confidential information of the Council of State with property tycoon Flavio Becca, a business partner of his who had a vested interest in the council's proposed regulations of MRIs and other diagnostics technology in private medical practices. A report in November later that year determined that Lux had disclosed the opinion of the council to "a person external to the institution" on 13 July, a few hours before a vote on the matter by council members. Lux was reprimanded, marking the first time the council had sanctioned one of its members.

On 10 April 2024, police searched the premises of the Council of State as part of an investigation into allegations of Lux misusing company assets, laundering money, breaching professional secrecy, and receiving stolen goods.
