= Ady Jung =

Luxembourgish politician (1938–2023)

Member of the Council of State of Luxembourg
- In office 28 May 2003 – 12 December 2010
- Preceded by: Marcel Sauber
- Succeeded by: Charles Lampers

President of the Benelux Interparliamentary Consultative Council
- In office 1 January 1995 – 31 December 1996
- Preceded by: Dick Dees
- Succeeded by: Chris Moors

Member of the Chamber of Deputies of Luxembourg for South
- In office 18 July 1989 – 28 May 2003
- Succeeded by: Nancy Kemp-Arendt

Personal details
- Born: 13 December 1938 Esch-sur-Alzette, Luxembourg
- Died: 15 September 2023 (aged 84)
- Party: CSV
- Occupation: Businessman

Ady Jung (13 December 1938 – 15 September 2023) was a Luxembourgish businessman and politician of the CSV.

== Biography ==
Born in Esch-sur-Alzette on 13 December 1938, Jung first entered the Chamber of Deputies following the 1989 legislative election, representing the South constituency. He was re-elected in 1994 and 1999. He left the Chamber following his nomination to the Council of State on 28 May 2003 and was replaced by Nancy Kemp-Arendt.

On 28 May 2013, Jung was named a member of the Council of State, succeeding Marcel Sauber. He left this position on 12 December 2010 due to age limits, and was replaced by Charles Lampers.

Jung served as president of the Benelux Interparliamentary Consultative Council from 1 January 1995 to 31 December 1996.

Ady Jung died on 15 September 2023, at the age of 84.

== Decorations ==
- Officer of the Order of the Oak Crown (1999)
