= Marcel Glesener =

Luxembourgish politician and trade unionist (1937–2025)

Marcel Glesener (17 April 1937 – 23 March 2025) was a Luxembourgish politician and trade unionist, who was a member of the Christian Social People's Party (CSV), sitting in the national legislature, the Chamber of Deputies.

Glesener was a member of the CSV from 1957. He was President of the CSV-leaning Luxembourg Confederation of Christian Trade Unions (LCGB) between 1980 and 1996, succeeding Jean Spautz. Glesener was elected to the Chamber of Deputies in the 1989 elections, representing the Sud constituency. He sat in the Chamber ever since, having been re-elected in 1994, 1999, and 2004.

He was a regular representative of the Chamber of Deputies in international organisations. Glesener was a member of the Parliamentary Assembly of the Council of Europe and a member of, and leader of the Luxembourgish delegation to, the Assembly of the Western European Union (WEU) since 1999. The latter includes spells as Vice-President (2000–03) and President (2003–04).

Glesener died on 23 March 2025, at the age of 87.

== Footnotes ==
Political offices
Preceded by Jan Dirk Blaauw	President of the Assembly of WEU; 2003–2004	Succeeded by Stef Goris
Trade union offices
Preceded by Jean Spautz	President of the LCGB; 1980–1996	Succeeded by Robert Weber
