= Lydie Err =

Luxembourgish politician (born 1949)

Lydie Err (born 23 April 1949, in Pétange) is a Luxembourgish politician.

She was elected to the Chamber of Deputies for the Luxembourg Socialist Workers' Party (LSAP) in 1984, representing Circonscription Sud. She was re-elected in 1989, 1994, 1999, and 2004. From 1989 until 1991, she sat as one of the two Vice-Presidents of the Chamber. She entered the Juncker-Poos Ministry in 1998 as a Secretary of State. She remained for one year, before the CSV-LSAP coalition collapsed in the wake of the LSAP's 1999 election defeat.
