= Mars Di Bartolomeo =

Luxembourgish politician

The Honourable Mars Di Bartolomeo
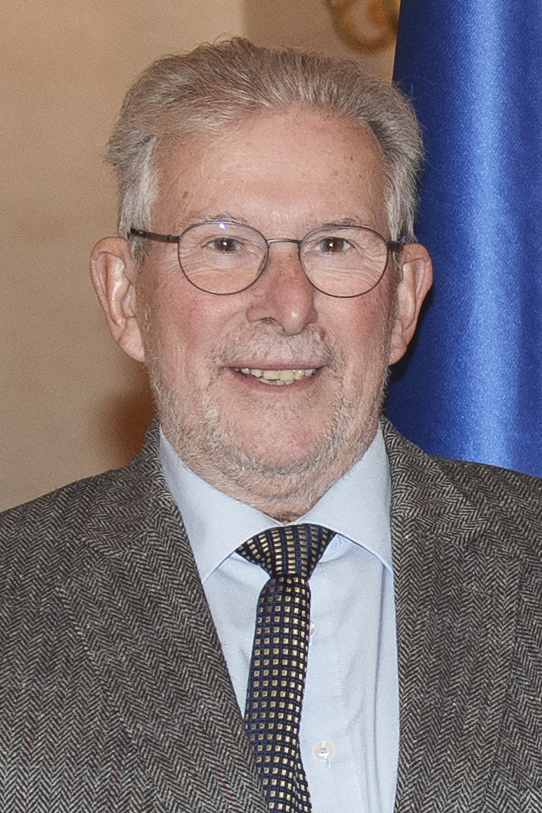
- Di Bartolomeo in 2015

Vice President of the Chamber of Deputies
- Incumbent
- Assumed office 21 November 2023 Serving with Michel Wolter and André Bauler
- President: Claude Wiseler
- Preceded by: Himself
- In office 6 December 2018 – 24 October 2023 Serving with Claude Wiseler and Djuna Bernard
- President: Fernand Etgen
- Preceded by: Simone Beissel; Laurent Mosar; Henri Kox

Member of the Chamber of Deputies
- Incumbent
- Assumed office 5 December 2013
- Constituency: South
- In office 18 July 1989 – 31 July 2004
- Constituency: South

President of the Chamber of Deputies
- In office 5 December 2013 – 30 October 2018
- Vice President: Simone Beissel; Laurent Mosar; Henri Kox
- Preceded by: Laurent Mosar
- Succeeded by: Fernand Etgen

Minister for Health and Social Security
- In office 31 July 2004 – 4 December 2013
- Prime Minister: Jean-Claude Juncker
- Preceded by: Carlo Wagner
- Succeeded by: Lydia Mutsch (Health); Romain Schneider (Social Security)

Mayor of Dudelange
- In office 1 January 1994 – 31 July 2004
- Preceded by: Louis Rech
- Succeeded by: Alex Bodry

Personal details
- Born: Marcel Jean Di Bartolomeo; 27 June 1952 (age 74) Dudelange, Luxembourg
- Party: LSAP

Marcel Jean "Mars" Di Bartolomeo (born 27 June 1952) is a Luxembourgish politician of the Luxembourg Socialist Workers' Party (LSAP) who served as President of the Chamber of Deputies from 2013 to 2018.

After attending the lycée in Esch-sur-Alzette, he worked for the Tageblatt newspaper from 1972 until 1984.

Di Bartolomeo worked as a parliamentary secretary for the LSAP from 1984 onwards. He was first elected to the Dudelange communcal council in 1987, and to the Chamber of Deputies in 1989. On 1 January 1994, Di Bartolomeo became Mayor of Dudelange, which he remained until his appointment as minister. From 2004 to 2013, he served as Minister of Health and Social Security in the first and second Juncker-Asselborn Governments.

== Honours ==
- Italy: Knight Grand Cross of the Order of Merit of the Italian Republic (2 June 2015)
- Portugal: Grand Cross of the Order of Merit (23 May 2017)

Political offices
Preceded by Louis Rech	Mayor of Dudelange; 1994–2004	Succeeded by Alex Bodry
Preceded by Laurent Mosar	President of the Chamber of Deputies; 2013–2018	Succeeded by Fernand Etgen
