= Alex Bodry =

Luxembourgish politician

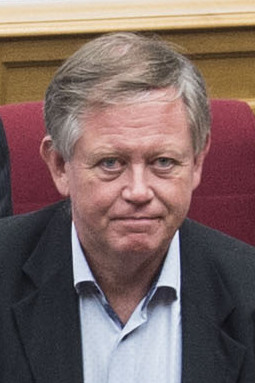
- Bodry in 2018

Member of the Council of State
- Incumbent
- Assumed office 21 January 2020
- Preceded by: Romain Nati

Member of the Chamber of Deputies
- In office 12 August 1999 – 21 January 2020
- Constituency: South
- In office 16 July 1984 – 12 June 1989
- Constituency: South

Mayor of Dudelange
- In office 13 August 2004 – 12 December 2014
- Preceded by: Mars Di Bartolomeo
- Succeeded by: Dan Biancalana

Minister for the Public Force, Physical Education, Sports and Youth
- In office 13 July 1994 – 7 August 1999
- Prime Minister: Jacques Santer; Jean-Claude Juncker
- Preceded by: Jacques Poos (Public Force); Johny Lahure (Physical Education, Sports and Youth)
- Succeeded by: Anne Brasseur (Sports); Marie-Josée Jacobs (Youth)

Minister for the Environment
- In office 30 January 1998 – 7 August 1999
- Prime Minister: Jean-Claude Juncker
- Preceded by: Johny Lahure
- Succeeded by: Charles Goerens
- In office 14 July 1989 – 13 July 1994
- Prime Minister: Jacques Santer
- Preceded by: Robert Krieps
- Succeeded by: Johny Lahure

Minister for Spatial Planning
- In office 14 July 1989 – 7 August 1999
- Prime Minister: Jacques Santer; Jean-Claude Juncker

Minister for Energy and Communications
- In office 14 July 1989 – 13 July 1994
- Prime Minister: Jacques Santer
- Preceded by: Marcel Schlechter
- Succeeded by: Robert Goebbels (Energy); Mady Delvaux-Stehres (Communications)

Personal details
- Born: 3 October 1958 (age 67) Dudelange, Luxembourg
- Citizenship: Luxembourgish
- Party: LSAP
- Education: Paris 1 Panthéon-Sorbonne University

Alex Bodry (born 3 October 1958) is a Luxembourgish politician.

== Life and career ==
Born 3 October 1958 in Dudelange, Bodry lived there since childhood. Coming from a family of socialist tradition (his grandfather Jean Fohrmann, was Member of Parliament and Mayor, union activist, member of the High authority of the ESCS and resistant fighter and his aunt Marthe Bigelbach-Fohrmann, was a socialist Member of Parliament from 1974 to 1979), he entered the Luxembourg Socialist Workers' Party at the age of 15. After his secondary education at the Lycée des Garçons in Esch-sur-Alzette, he studied law at the Sorbonne University (Paris I) where he passed his master's degree and became lawyer in Luxembourg. Neither his university studies, nor his professional activity as a lawyer cut his links with his home town to which he remains deeply attached.

Elected in 1982 a local councillor at the age of twenty three years only, Alex Bodry remained in the municipal council until 1989 when he joined the Government.

Alongside his local work, Alex Bodry began a national political career which led him in 1984 to become a Member of Parliament and in 1989 a member of the Government. He was elected - until now - four times at the "Chambre des Députés", the first time at the age of 25.

Having been Minister from 1989 till 1999 in various departments (Environment, Town and country planning, Communication, Energy, Youth, Sports, Police and Armed forces), he became 1st alderman of his home town Dudelange and became Mayor after the elections of 2004.

Alex Bodry contributed to the development of the environmental law in Luxembourg and was the Minister responsible for the merger of the Gendarmerie and for the Police in his country.

To ensure a dynamic and sustainable development of the former "Forge of the South" after the decline of the steel industry, such is the political objective of the local elected representative. The revitalization of the city centre combined with an active support for the life of districts and for the sanitation of the ARCELOR Brownfield sites are the key elements of the urbanistic revival of Dudelange. His commitment to a careful budgetary policy allowed to loosen the financial and political margins to guarantee investments in the future of Dudelange.

In the same year of 2004 Alex Bodry became national a president of the Luxembourg Socialist Workers' Party ( LSAP). He also serves as vice-president of the socialist parliamentary group since then. In addition, he is a member of the PES presidency (Party of European Socialists). His political priorities are at present oriented to legal and institutional questions, public finances and the economy. Designated twice Rapporteur of the Budget, the politician from Dudelange is the author of several bills of law and revision of the Constitution.

He is at present an honorary president of the Luxemburg Federation of athletics, of which he was the national president from 2000 till 2010. In 2007 he was elected vice-president of the AASSE. The jurist is also the author of several law books including a reference book on the non-contentious administrative procedure. Alex Bodry is married with Martine Kohn and father of two girls. During his spare time he likes to find antiques and to attend music concerts.
