= Nancy Kemp-Arendt =

Luxembourgish politician and sportswoman

The Honourable Nancy Kemp-Arednt
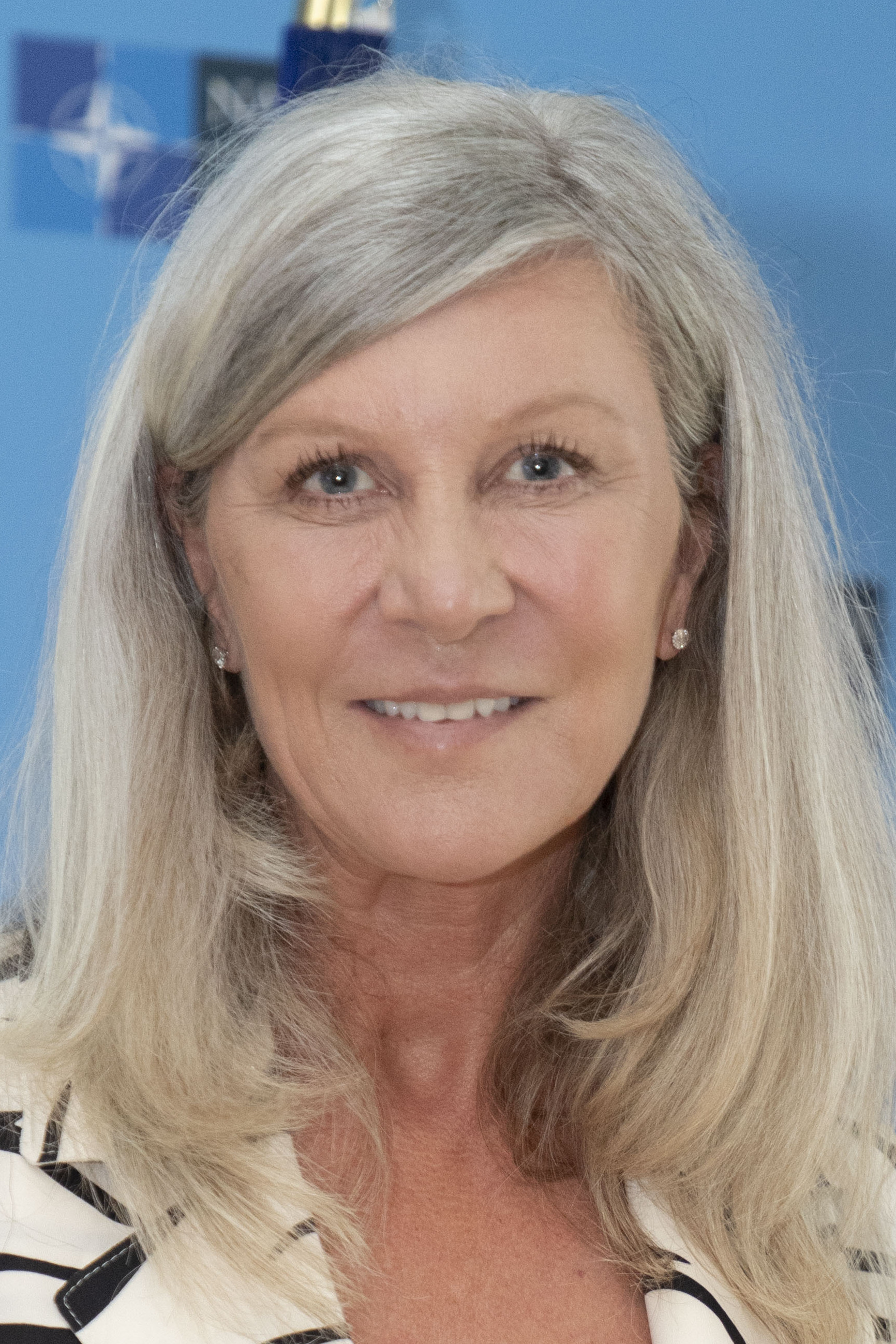
- Kemp-Arendt in 2024

Member of the Chamber of Deputies
- Incumbent
- Assumed office 3 August 2004
- Constituency: South
- In office 3 June 2003 – 5 June 2004
- Preceded by: Ady Jung
- Constituency: South
- In office 23 January 1996 – 8 June 1999
- Preceded by: François Colling
- Constituency: South

Personal details
- Born: 22 May 1969 (age 57) Esch-sur-Alzette, Luxembourg
- Party: CSV (since 1993)
- Profession: Journalist

Nancy Kemp-Arendt (née Arendt; born 22 May 1969) is a Luxembourgish politician and former athlete. She competed in triathlon and swimming. She now sits in the national legislature, the Chamber of Deputies, for the Christian Social People's Party.

Kemp-Arendt competed under her maiden name, Nancy Arendt, at the 1988 Summer Olympics, in Seoul. Participating in the 100m breaststroke and 200m breaststroke, she finished twenty-ninth and thirty-first respectively. After converting to triathlon, Kemp-Arendt competed in that sport's first appearance in the Summer Olympics, in 2000. She took tenth place with a total time of 2:03:14.94. She has won the title of Luxembourgish Sportswoman of the Year a total of six times – two for swimming and four for triathlon – making her the only athlete (male or female) to have won it for success in two different sports.

After her early sporting success, Arendt went into politics, becoming a member for the Christian Social People's Party (CSV) in 1993. She was appointed to the Chamber of Deputies to fill a vacancy on 23 January 1996, and finished out the term until the 1999 general election. In that election, she finished eleventh on the CSV list for the South constituency, with seven being elected. However, this was high enough to ensure her replacement of Ady Jung on 3 June 2003, in whose place she served until the following year. She placed eleventh again in the following election, but on a landslide CSV victory that saw nine CSV members elected from the South, allowing her to be appointed to fill one of three minister-vacated seats, and has sat in the Chamber since then.
