= Spautz =

Spautz is a surname. Notable people with the surname include:

- Jean Spautz (born 1930), Luxembourgish politician and trade unionist
- Marc Spautz (born 1963), Luxembourgish politician and trade unionist, son of Jean
