= Minister for Planning =

Minister for Planning may refer to:

- Minister of State for Housing and Planning (United Kingdom)
- Minister for Planning and the Environment of Luxembourg
- Minister for Planning (New South Wales)
- Minister for Planning (Western Australia)
- Minister for Planning (Victoria)
