= André Hoffmann =

André Hoffmann may refer to:

- André Hoffmann (businessman) (born 1958), Swiss businessman
- André Hoffmann (footballer) (born 1993), a German footballer
- André Hoffmann (politician) (born 1941), a Luxembourgish politician
- André Hoffmann (speed skater) (born 1961), a German speed skater
