= Revolutionary Socialist Youth =

Revolutionary Socialist Youth (in French: Jeunesse Socialiste Révolutionnaire) was the youth wing of the Revolutionary Socialist Party (PSR). It published De Fonken. JSR was founded in 1978.

JSR is the continuation of Schülerfront, that existed 1971-1977.
