= Marc Spautz =

Luxembourgish politician

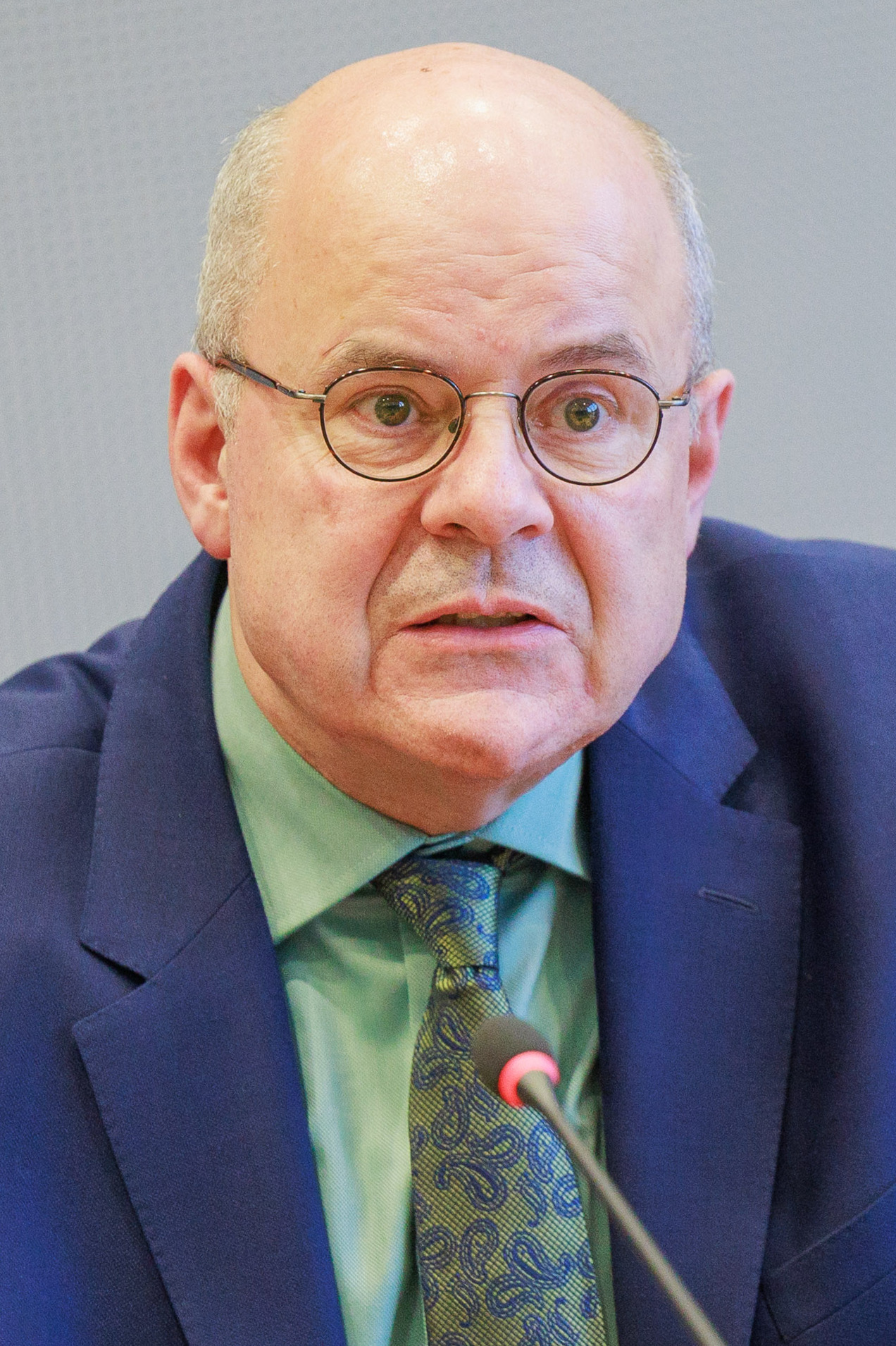
- Spautz in 2024

Minister of Labour
- Incumbent
- Assumed office 11 December 2025
- Prime Minister: Luc Frieden
- Government: Frieden-Bettel
- Preceded by: Georges Mischo

Member of the Chamber of Deputies
- In office 5 December 2013 – 11 December 2025
- Succeeded by: Georges Mischo
- Constituency: South
- In office 13 July 2004 – 30 April 2013
- Succeeded by: Pierre Mellina
- Constituency: South

Minister for Family and Integration
- In office 30 April 2013 – 4 December 2013
- Prime Minister: Jean-Claude Juncker
- Government: Juncker–Asselborn II
- Preceded by: Marie-Josée Jacobs
- Succeeded by: Corinne Cahen

Minister for Cooperation and Humanitarian Action
- In office 30 April 2013 – 4 December 2013
- Prime Minister: Jean-Claude Juncker
- Government: Juncker–Asselborn II
- Preceded by: Marie-Josée Jacobs
- Succeeded by: Romain Schneider

Minister for Relations with Parliament
- In office 30 April 2013 – 4 December 2013
- Prime Minister: Jean-Claude Juncker
- Government: Juncker–Asselborn II
- Preceded by: Octavie Modert
- Succeeded by: Fernand Etgen

Personal details
- Born: 10 April 1963 (age 63) Esch-sur-Alzette, Luxembourg
- Party: CSV
- Relatives: Jean Spautz (father)

Marc Spautz (born 10 April 1963) is a Luxembourgish politician. A member of the Christian Social People's Party (CSV), he has served as Minister of Labour in the Frieden-Bettel Government since December 2025. He previously served as a member of the Chamber of Deputies from 2004 to 2025, except from April to December 2013, during which time he occupied several portfolios as a minister in the Juncker–Asselborn II Government. He was president of the CSV group in the Chamber from 2023 to 2025.

He is the son of Jean Spautz, a fellow CSV politician and trade union leader, who served as Minister of Internal Affairs (1980-1995) and President of the Chamber of Deputies (1995-2004). Marc followed in his father's footsteps, becoming a member of the CSV in 1981. In local politics, Spautz was a member of the Schifflange communal council from 1994 to 2025 – except during his time as a minister – and was an alderman in the commune from 2000 to 2005, from 2011 to 2013 and from 2017 to 2025.

Party political offices
| Preceded by Claude Wiseler | General Secretary of the CSV; 2009–2012 | Succeeded by Laurent Zeimet |
| Preceded by Lucien Thiel | President of the CSV in the Chamber of Deputies; 2011–2013 | Succeeded by Gilles Roth |
