= Georges Mischo =

Luxembourgish politician (born 1974)

The Honourable Georges Mischo
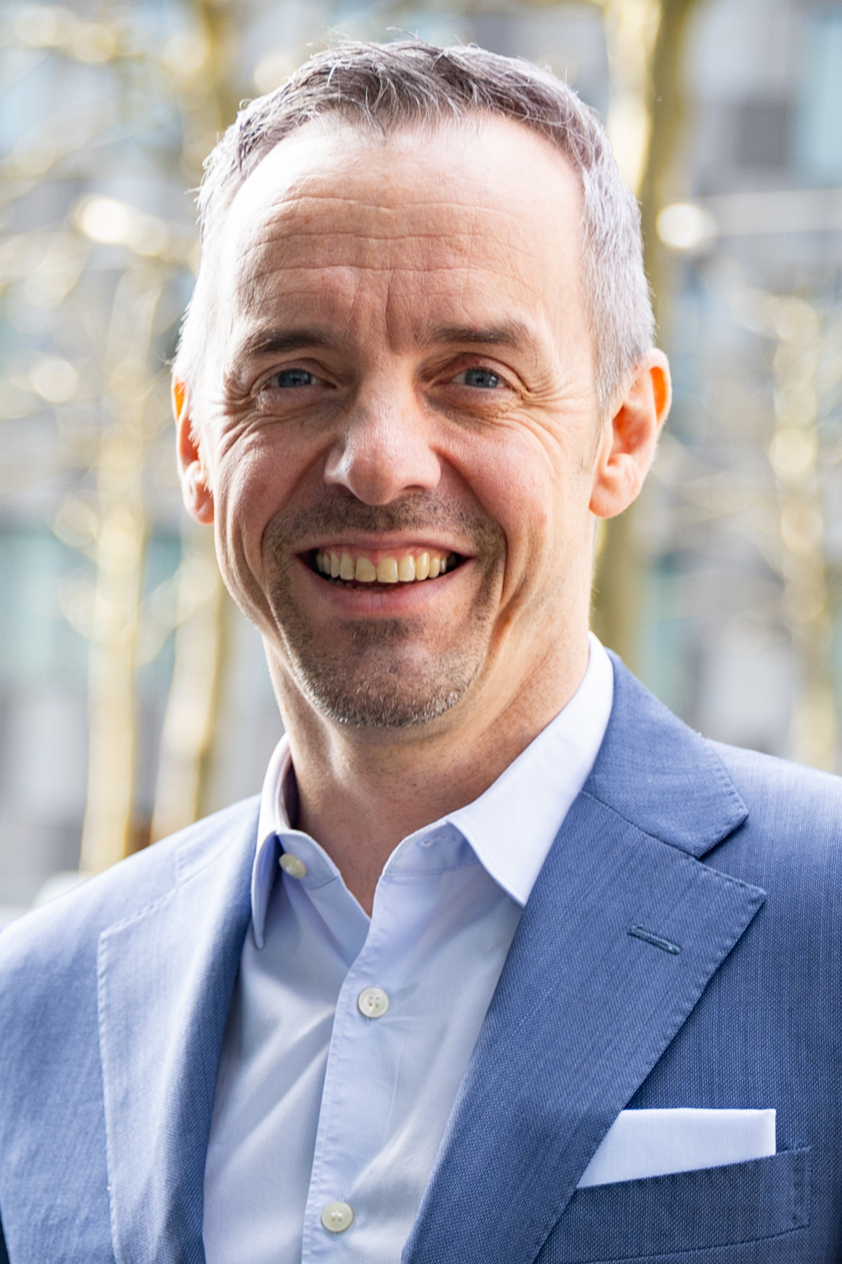
- Mischo in 2025

Member of the Chamber of Deputies
- Incumbent
- Assumed office 20 January 2026
- Preceded by: Marc Spautz
- Constituency: South
- In office 30 October 2018 – 17 November 2013
- Constituency: South

Minister of Labour and Sport
- In office 17 November 2023 – 11 December 2025
- Prime Minister: Luc Frieden
- Preceded by: Georges Engel
- Succeeded by: Marc Spautz (Labour); Martine Hansen (Sport)

Mayor of Esch-sur-Alzette
- In office 14 November 2017 – 17 November 2023
- Preceded by: Vera Spautz
- Succeeded by: Christian Weis

Personal details
- Born: 18 September 1974 (age 52)
- Party: Christian Social People's Party

Georges Mischo (born 18 September 1974) is a Luxembourgish politician and former sports teacher. A member of the Christian Social People's Party (CSV), he served as Minister of Labour and Sports in the Frieden-Bettel Government from 2023 to 2025. He was previously mayor of Esch-sur-Alzette from 2017 to 2023 and a member of the Chamber of Deputies from 2018 to 2023.

In 2025, during the renewal of the supervisory board of the Coque, a key sports and cultural facility in Luxembourg City, Georges Mischo faced criticism for appointing individuals from his personal circle—most notably François Knaff as president and Anne Heintz as vice president. While concerns of favoritism were raised, Mischo defended the appointments as justified and merit-based, highlighting the need for effective communication between the Coque leadership and the ministry.

On 8 December 2025, Prime Minister Luc Frieden announced Mischo’s resignation from the government, citing “hurtful and unfair criticism” amidst controversy surrounding both Mischo’s relationship with trade unions and the abandonment of a project for a sports museum in Esch-sur-Alzette.
