= André Hoffmann (politician) =

Luxembourgish politician (born 1941)

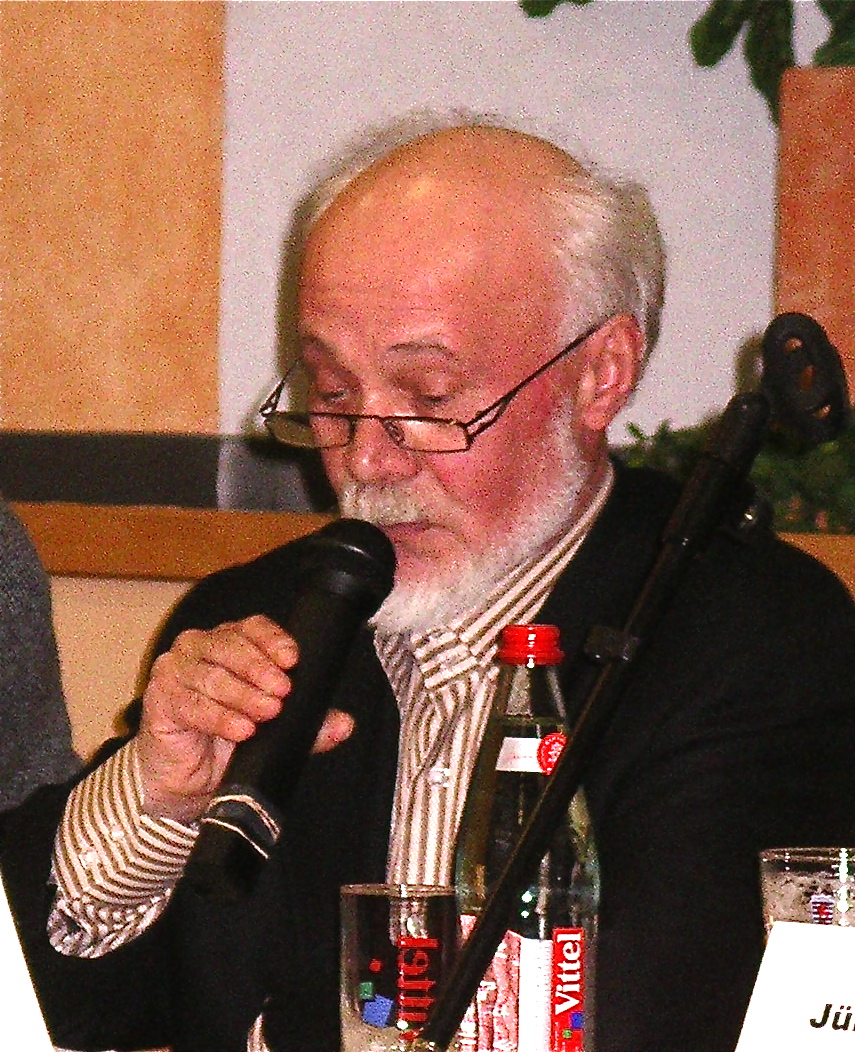
André Hoffmann

André Hoffmann (born 18 October 1941 in Luxembourg City) is a Luxembourgish politician from The Left. He was formerly leader of the Communist Party (KPL). He was a member of the Chamber of Deputies, but resigned in 2000 to become échevin of Esch-sur-Alzette, being replaced in the Chamber by Aloyse Bisdorff. He remained on Esch-sur-Alzette communal council until 2008, when he was replaced by Marc Baum to allow Hoffmann to concentrate on the 2009 election to the Chamber of Deputies.

Hoffmann was born in Luxembourg City, but moved to Esch in 1970 upon becoming a teacher at the Lycée de Garçons Esch-sur-Alzette.

Hoffmann led the 'Committee for the No' that campaigned for a 'no' vote in the 2005 referendum on the ratification of the European Constitution. However, in the face of otherwise widespread support for the Constitution, the committee's reliance on socialist arguments and figureheads like Hoffmann limited the movement's effectiveness.

In the 2009 elections, Hoffmann was returned to Parliament as the Left increased its share of the vote to 3.3%. Hoffmann's personal vote of 9,067 in the south constituency was almost equal to the total number of votes gathered by all Communist Party candidates standing (a total of 10,803 votes).
