= Luc Emering =

Luxembourgish politician (born 1996)

The Honourable Luc Emering

Member of the Chamber of Deputies
- Incumbent
- Assumed office 24 October 2023
- Constituency: South

First Alderman of Dippach
- Incumbent
- Assumed office 3 July 2023
- Mayor: Manon Bei-Roller
- Preceded by: Max Hahn

Personal details
- Born: 13 July 1996 (age 29)
- Party: Democratic Party

Luc Emering (born 13 July 1996) is a Luxembourgish farmer and politician of the Democratic Party who was elected member of the Chamber of Deputies in 2023. He was elected councillor of Dippach in the 2017 communal elections, and became first deputy mayor in 2023.
