= Félix Eischen =

Luxembourgish politician (born 1966)

The Honourable Félix Eischen

Member of the Chamber of Deputies
- Incumbent
- Assumed office 8 July 2009
- Constituency: South

Personal details
- Born: 5 February 1966 (age 60) Luxembourg City, Luxembourg
- Party: Christian Social People's Party

Félix Eischen (born 5 February 1966) is a Luxembourgish politician and former journalist. He has served as a member of the Chamber of Deputies from South since 2009. He is a member of the Christian Social People's Party.
