= Max Hahn =

Luxembourgish politician (born 1981)

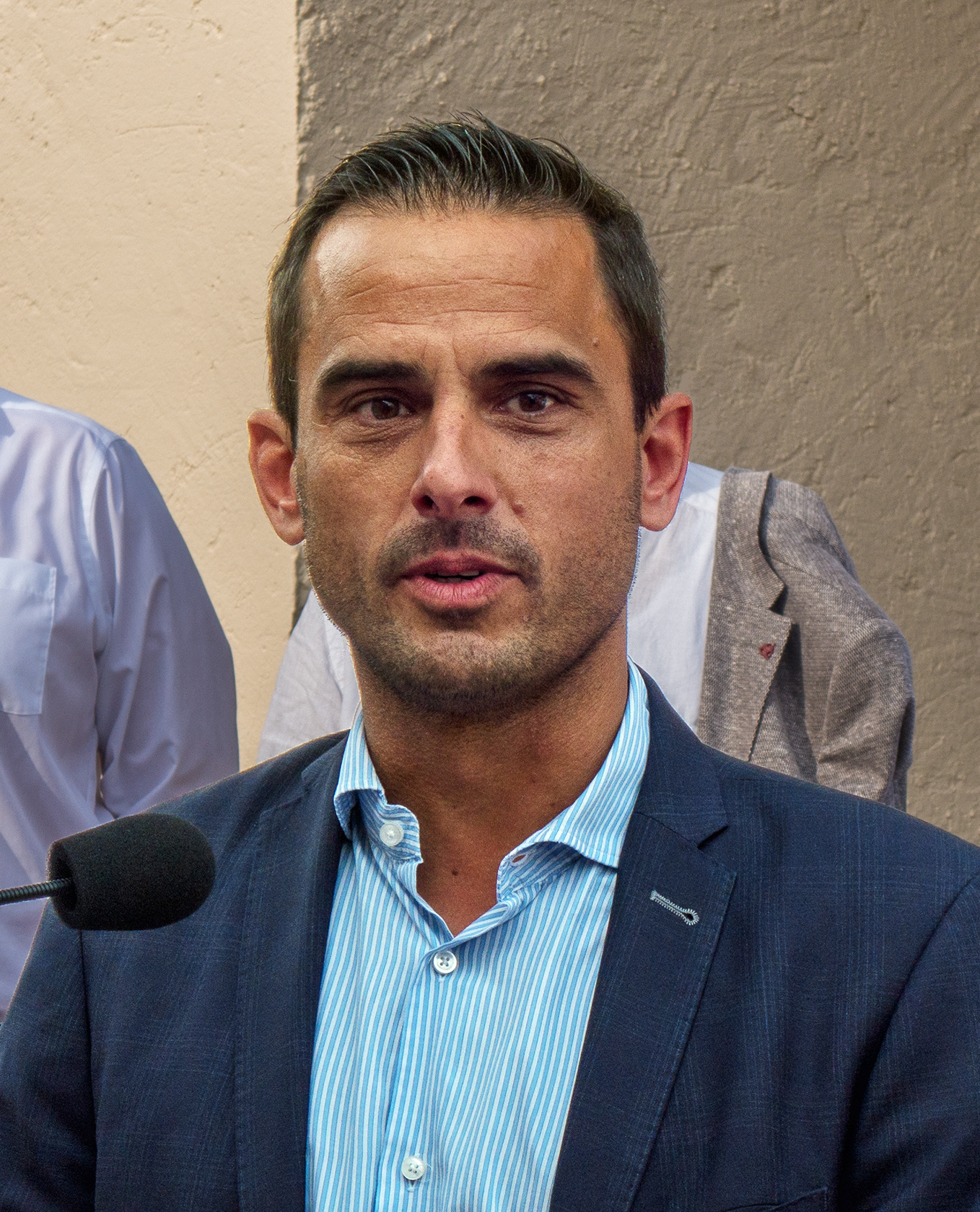
- Hahn in 2023

Minister for Family Affairs, Solidarity, Living Together and Reception of Refugees
- Incumbent
- Assumed office 17 November 2023
- Prime Minister: Luc Frieden
- Government: Frieden-Bettel
- Preceded by: Himself (Family Affairs)

Minister for Family Affairs, Integration and the Greater Region
- In office 15 June 2023 – 17 November 2023
- Prime Minister: Xavier Bettel
- Government: Bettel II
- Preceded by: Corinne Cahen
- Succeeded by: Himself (Family Affairs)

Member of the Chamber of Deputies
- In office 5 December 2013 – 27 June 2023
- Preceded by: Claude Meisch
- Succeeded by: Barbara Agostino
- Constituency: South

First Alderman of Dippach
- In office 10 November 2011 – 15 June 2023
- Mayor: Ady Hahn; Manon Bei-Roller
- Succeeded by: Luc Emering

Personal details
- Born: 30 April 1981 (age 44)
- Party: Democratic Party

Max Hahn (born 30 April 1981) is a Luxembourgish politician of the Democratic Party serving as Minister for Family Affairs since 2023. He was previously a member of the Chamber of Deputies from 2013 to 2023. From 2010 to 2013, he was president of the Democratic and Liberal Youth.
