= Lydia Mutsch =

Luxembourgish politician (born 1961)

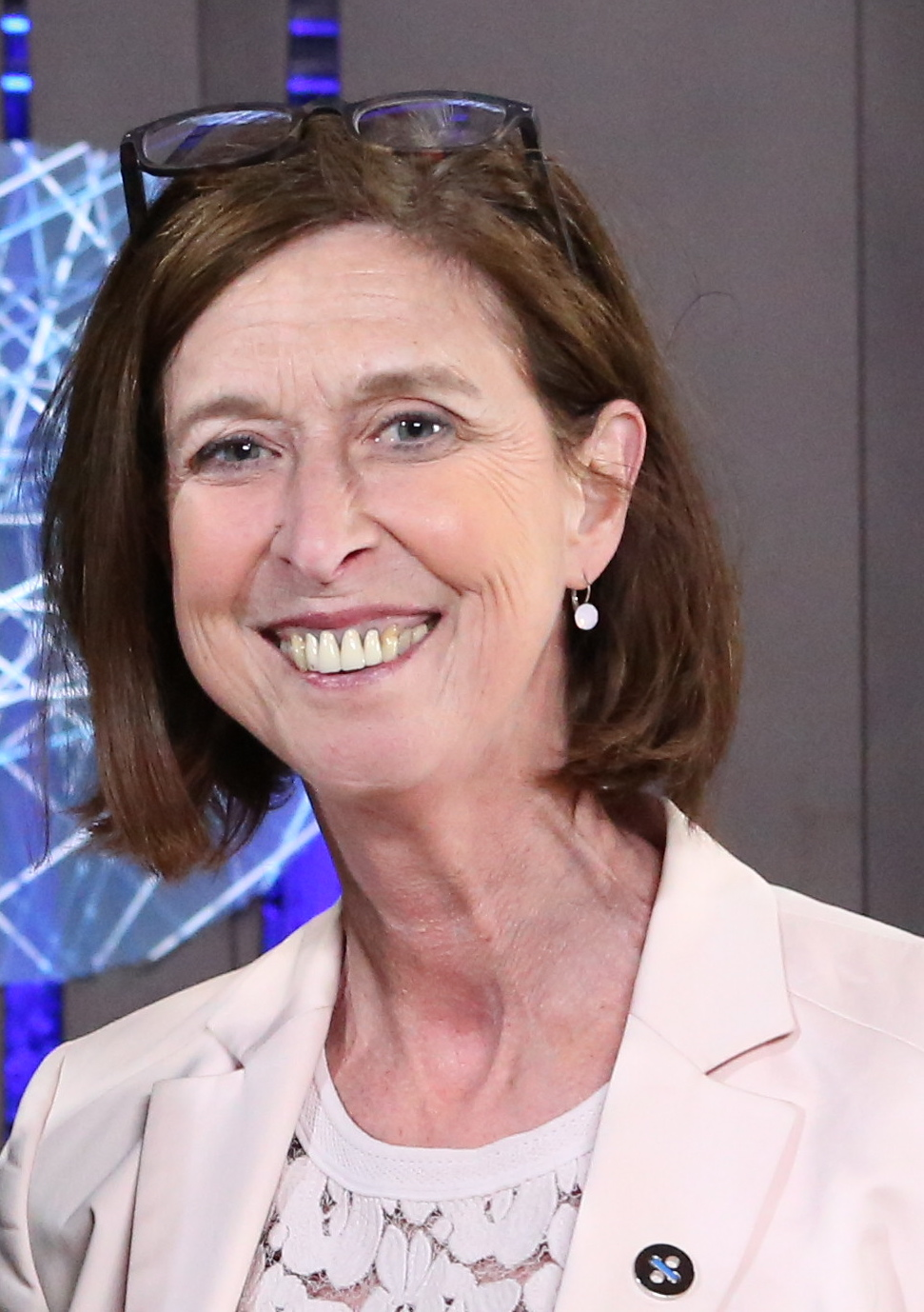
- Mutsch in 2017

Minister of Health
- In office December 2013 – December 2018
- Prime Minister: Xavier Bettel
- Preceded by: Mars Di Bartolomeo
- Succeeded by: Etienne Schneider

Minister of Equal Opportunities
- In office December 2013 – December 2018
- Prime Minister: Xavier Bettel
- Preceded by: Françoise Hetto-Gaasch
- Succeeded by: Taina Bofferding

Mayor of Esch-sur-Alzette
- In office 2000–2013
- Preceded by: François Schaack
- Succeeded by: Vera Spautz

Member of the Esch-sur-Alzette communal council
- Incumbent
- Assumed office 1988

Personal details
- Born: August 17, 1961 (age 64) Dudelange, Luxembourg
- Party: LSAP

Lydia Mutsch (born 17 August 1961) is a Luxembourgish politician. She served as Minister of Health and Minister for Equal Opportunities in the Bettel I Government from December 2013 until December 2018.

Mutsch studied in Göttingen and was a member of the national legislature, the Chamber of Deputies, from her 1989 election until her appointment as Minister of Health. From 2000 to 2013, she was the Mayor of Esch-sur-Alzette, having previously sat on the communal council since 1988. She has been a member of the Luxembourg Socialist Workers' Party since 1987.

== Footnotes ==
Political offices
Preceded by François Schaack	Mayor of Esch-sur-Alzette; 2000–2013	Succeeded by Vera Spautz
