= List of mayors of Esch-sur-Alzette =

Mayor of Esch-sur-Alzette
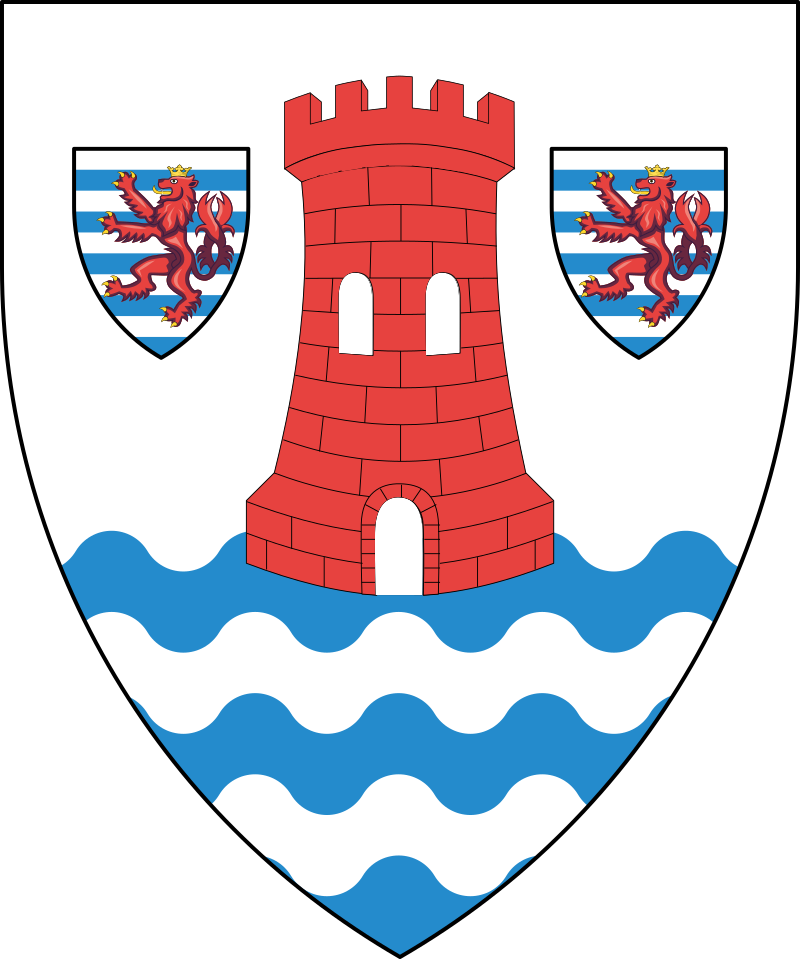
- Coat of arms of Esch-sur-Alzette
- Incumbent; Christian Weis since 7 December 2023
- Member of: Esch-sur-Alzette communal council
- Formation: 1814
- First holder: Johannes-Nepomuk Haas

The following persons have been mayor of the commune and city of Esch-sur-Alzette in Luxembourg.

== List of mayors ==
No.	Portrait	Name	Term		Party
1		Johannes-Nepomuk Haas	1814	1828	Unaffiliated
2		Henri Motté	1828	1830	Unaffiliated
3		Jacques Schmit	1830	1836	Unaffiliated
4		François-Joseph Hoferlin	1836	1841	Unaffiliated
5		Dominique Stoffel	1841	1843	Unaffiliated
6		Jacques Schmit	1843	1861	Unaffiliated
7		Pierre Claude	1861	1878	Unaffiliated
8		Dominique Joseph Hoferlin	1879	1906	Unaffiliated
9		Léon Metz	1906	1909	Unaffiliated
10		Armand Spoo	1909	1911	Unaffiliated
11		Jean-Pierre Michels	1912	1917	Unaffiliated
12		Nicolas Biwer	1917	1919	PD
13		Pierre Pierrard	1919	1920	PD
14		Victor Wilhelm	1921	1934	SP
15		Hubert Clément	1935	1945 (Note: Mayor in name only under Nazi occupation (1940 - 1944))	SP
16		Arthur Useldinger	1946	1949	KPL
17		Michel Rasquin	1949	1951	LSAP
18		Antoine Krier	1951	1965	LSAP
19		Jules Schreiner	1965	1969	LSAP
20		Arthur Useldinger	1970	1978	KPL
21		Joseph Brebsom	1978	1990	LSAP
22		François Schaack	1990	April 2000	LSAP
23		Lydia Mutsch	April 2000	15 January 2013	LSAP
24		Vera Spautz	15 January 2013	14 November 2017	LSAP
25		Georges Mischo	14 November 2017	7 December 2023	CSV
26		Christian Weis	7 December 2023	Incumbent	CSV
