= Gaston Gibéryen =

Luxembourgish politician

Gaston "Gast" Gibéryen (born 29 June 1950 in Born) is a Luxembourgish politician for the Alternative Democratic Reform Party (ADR) and trade unionist. He was a member of the Chamber of Deputies and represented the Sud constituency from 1989 to 2020. He was the leader of the ADR group in the Chamber.

Gibéryen was mayor of Frisange from 1982 until 2005, having previously been an alderman in the commune (1976–1981). His long tenure there has been credited with making the commune into a stronghold of the ADR, which achieved its best nationwide results there at general elections in 2013 and 2018.
