= List of ministers for the environment of Luxembourg =

The minister for the environment (Luxembourgish: Ëmweltminister) was a position in the government of Luxembourg. Among other competences, the minister for the environment is responsible for carrying out government policy on the environment; for ensuring sustainable development; for promoting development of new energy sources; and for protecting forests, parks, and areas of importance to the environment.

The office was first created on 17 June 1974, under the auspices of the Minister for Public Health and the Environment (Ministre de la Santé publique et de l’Environnement). On 16 September 1977, the environment brief was separated from that of public health, and combined with that of tourism, creating the post of Minister for the Environment and Tourism (Ministre de l’Environnement et du Tourisme). It was first created as a separate post on 20 July 1979. It was subsumed within the greater office of Minister for Planning and the Environment (Ministre de l'Aménagement du Territoire et de l’Environnement), between 14 July 1989 and 13 July 1994, before being recreated as a separate position. On 23 July 2009, it was merged with the positions of Minister for Public Works and Minister for Transport to create the new title of Minister for Sustainable Development and Infrastructure.

== List of ministers for the environment ==
Minister	Party	Start date	End date	Prime Minister
Émile Krieps	DP	17 June 1974	16 September 1977	Gaston Thorn
Josy Barthel	DP	16 September 1977	20 July 1979	Gaston Thorn
Josy Barthel	DP	20 July 1979	20 July 1984	Pierre Werner
Robert Krieps	LSAP	20 July 1984	14 July 1989	Jacques Santer
Alex Bodry	LSAP	14 July 1989	13 July 1994	Jacques Santer
Johny Lahure	LSAP	13 July 1994	26 January 1995	Jacques Santer
Johny Lahure	LSAP	26 January 1995	30 January 1998	Jean-Claude Juncker
Alex Bodry	LSAP	30 January 1998	7 August 1999	Jean-Claude Juncker
Charles Goerens	DP	7 August 1999	31 July 2004	Jean-Claude Juncker
Lucien Lux	LSAP	31 July 2004	23 July 2009	Jean-Claude Juncker
