= Laurent Zeimet =

Luxembourgish politician (born 1974)

The Honourable Laurent Zeimet
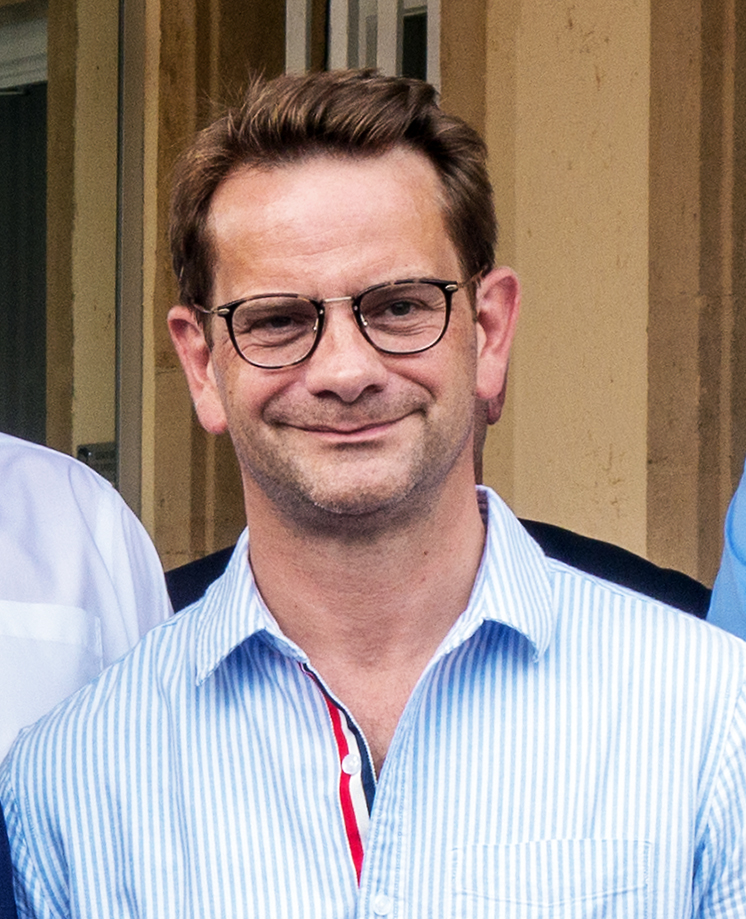
- Zeimet in 2023

Member of the Chamber of Deputies
- Incumbent
- Assumed office 24 October 2023
- Constituency: South
- In office 4 November 2014 – 30 October 2018

Personal details
- Born: 12 October 1974 (age 51) Esch-sur-Alzette, Luxembourg
- Party: Christian Social People's Party

Laurent Zeimet (Luxembourgish pronunciation: ['loʀɑ̃ː 'tsɑjmæt]; born 12 October 1974) is a Luxembourgish politician. Since 2023, he has served as a member of the Chamber of Deputies from South. He previously served as a member of the Chamber from 2014 to 2018. He also serves as the mayor of Bettembourg.
