= Revolutionary Socialist Party (Luxembourg) =

Defunct political party in Luxembourg

Revolutionary Socialist Party Revolutionär Sozialistesch Partei
- Founded: 5 September 1970
- Dissolved: 1999
- Newspaper: Sozialistesch Aktioun
- Youth wing: Revolutionary Socialist Youth
- Ideology: Communism; Trotskyism
- Political position: Far-left
- International affiliation: Fourth International (post-reunification)

The Revolutionary Socialist Party (Luxembourgish: Revolutionär Sozialistesch Partei, French: Parti Socialiste Révolutionnaire), abbreviated to RSP, was a far-left party in Luxembourg. At its start, it was a Trotskiyst group active in the late 1960s in the General Association of Luxembourgish Students. When the majority of students' group became Maoist and was transformed in the Revolutionary Socialist Left, the Trotskyist minority split and founded the Revolutionary Communist League (French: Ligue Communiste Révolutionnaire) in September 1970. It published Klassenkampf starting in 1970, and in December 1984 was renamed the Revolutionary Socialist Party and published Sozialistesch Aktioun until 1992.

The party had more than 100 members in the early seventies and 27 in 1985.

Under both names, it took part in the elections to Luxembourgish parliament from 1974 until 1989, winning no seats and between 0.2 and 0.4% of the vote. In the European elections between 1979 and 1989 it won between 0.4 and 0.6%.

In 1994 the RSP became part of the New Left which was founded by a faction of the Communist Party of Luxembourg. When The Left was established in 1999 by the New Left and the Communist Party, the RSP dissolved and its members joined the new party.

Leading members of the RSP were Robert Engel, André Kremer, Gaston Kremer, Jean-Pierre "Jhemp" Lulling, Robert Mertzig, Marc Reckinger, Joseph Wirth. The former RSP militants Justin Turpel, Antoine Jost and Thérèse Gorza are prominent members of The Left.

== See also ==
- Revolutionary Socialist Youth
