= Hubert Clément =

Luxembourgish journalist and politician (1889–1953)

Hubert Clément (12 September 1889 – 29 September 1953) was a Luxembourgish journalist and politician. He served as the Mayor of Esch-sur-Alzette, as a member of the Council of State, as a member of the Chamber of Deputies. He was a director of the Tageblatt newspaper, based in Esch-sur-Alzette.

He gives his name to the Lycée Hubert Clément, a school in Esch-sur-Alzette, the construction of which was made possible by the city's purchase of the land in 1938, under Clément's mayoralty.

== Footnotes ==
Political offices
Preceded by Victor Wilhelm	Mayor of Esch-sur-Alzette; 1935–1945	Succeeded by Arthur Useldinger
