= Antoine Krier =

Luxembourgish politician

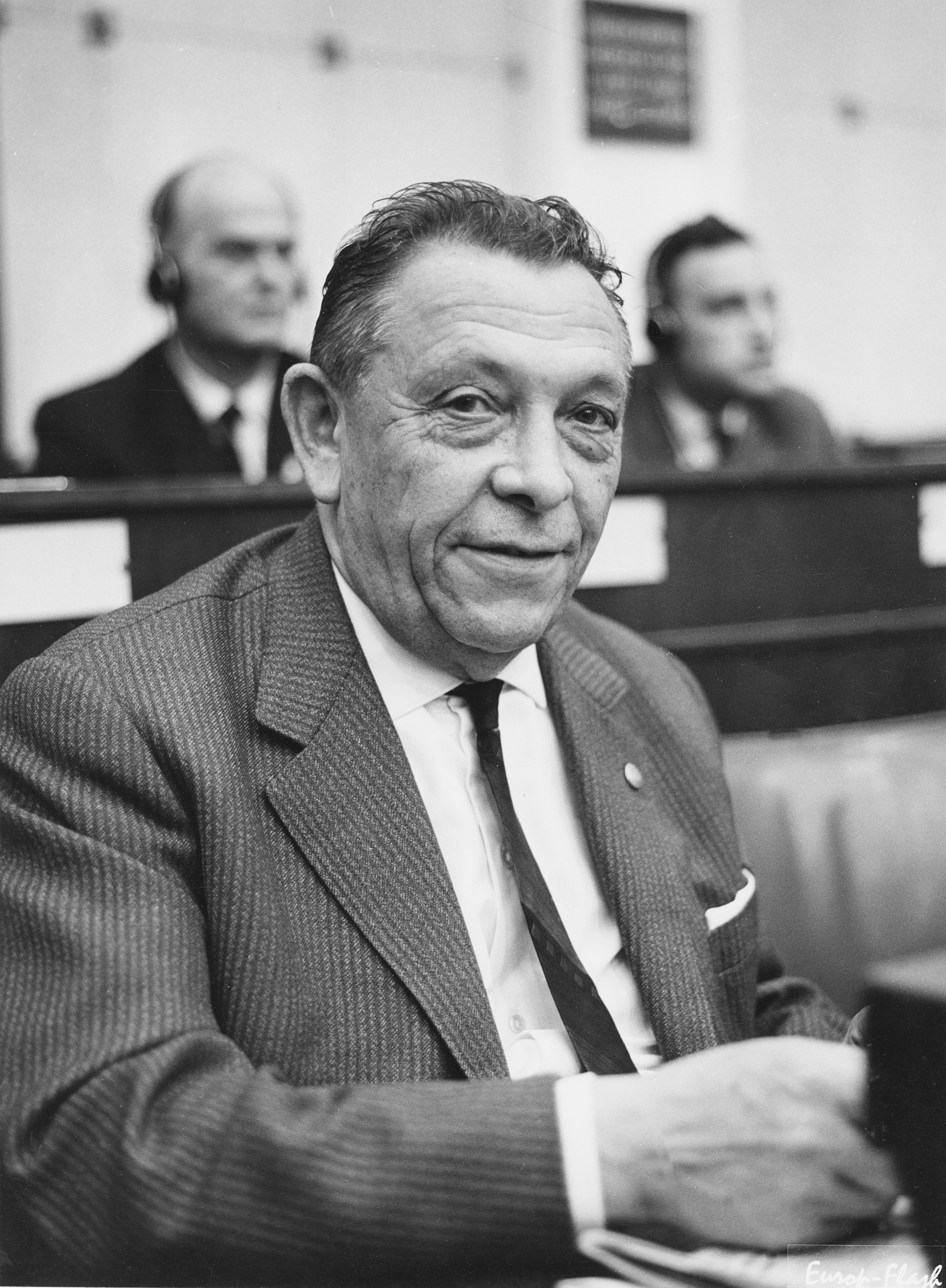
Krier in 1963

Antoine Krier (21 April 1897 – 22 September 1983) was a Luxembourgish politician for the Luxembourg Socialist Workers' Party (LSAP).

From 1929 until 1935, Krier was the President of the LSAP's predecessor party, the Socialist Party. From 1951 to 1959 he was a substitute member for Luxembourg in the European Parliament.

Antoine was the brother of fellow politician Pierre Krier.

Political offices
Preceded by Michel Rasquin	Mayor of Esch-sur-Alzette; 1951–1965	Succeeded by Jules Schreiner
