= Johny Lahure =

Luxembourgish politician (1942-2003)

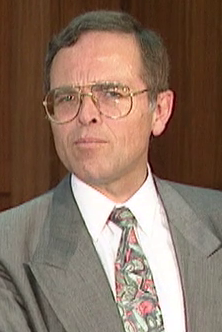
Lahure in 1994

Johny Lahure (24 March 1942 – 23 November 2003) was a Luxembourgish politician. He served as the minister for the environment from 1994 until 1998, under both Jacques Santer and Jean-Claude Juncker. In this capacity, as Luxembourg was chairing the Council of the European Union in the second half of 1997, Lahure conducted negotiations on behalf of the European Union that led to the Kyoto Protocol. He resigned in 1998 after a corruption scandal.

He also served on the Council of State of Luxembourg from 1974 to 1984.

Political offices
Preceded by Alex Bodry	Minister for the Environment; 1994 – 1998	Succeeded by Alex Bodry
