= Marc Goergen =

Luxembourgish economist

- Education: University of Oxford, Université libre de Bruxelles
- Occupation: Professor
- Organization(s): IE Business School, European Corporate Governance Institute
- Known for: Corporate governance, corporate finance
- Website: https://www.ie.edu/business-school/faculty-and-research/faculty/marc-goergen/

Marc Goergen is a Luxembourgish economist working as a professor of finance at IE Business School in Madrid. He specialises in corporate governance and corporate finance. Marc Goergen is the author of academic articles, book chapters and several books on corporate governance.

His articles have appeared in The Journal of Finance, the Journal of Financial Intermediation, the Journal of Corporate Finance, the Journal of Law, Economics and Organization, Industrial Relations - A Journal of Economy and Society as well as others. Goergen is the second most published author and the third most cited author in the Journal of Corporate Finance.

Goergen has been a Research Associate of the European Corporate Governance Institute (ECGI) since 2002.

== Academic career ==
Goergen has held a chair in finance at Cardiff Business School from 2009 to 2018 before joining IE Business School. He was Head of the Accounting and Finance Section at Cardiff Business School from 2014 to 2017. Other previous appointments include the University of Manchester, UMIST (University of Manchester Institute of Science and Technology), the University of Reading and the University of Sheffield. He holds a DPhil in Economics from Keble College of the University of Oxford and a Licence en Sciences Economiques from the Université libre de Bruxelles (ULB).

Goergen is an associate editor of the Journal Corporate Finance, European Financial Management, the British Journal of Management and the European Journal of Finance, as well as an Editorial Board Member of the Journal of Management and Governance, the Journal of Business Finance & Accounting, and the International Journal of Corporate Governance.

== Books ==
- Goergen, M. (2018), Corporate Governance. A Global Perspective, Andover: Cengage Learning EMEA.
- Goergen M. (2012), International Corporate Governance, Harlow: Pearson Education Prentice Hall, 336 p.
- Goergen, M., Mallin, C., Mitleton-Kelly, E., Al-Hawamdeh, A. and I. Chiu (2010), Corporate Governance and Complexity Theory, Cheltenham: Edward Elgar, 133+ix p.
- Correia da Silva, L., Goergen, M. and L. Renneboog (2004), Dividend Policy and Corporate Governance, Oxford: Oxford University Press, 185+xiv p. Translated into Chinese: Gu Li Zheng Ce Yu Gong Si Zhi Li, Beijing: Peking University Press, 2006.
- Goergen, M. (1998), Corporate Governance and Financial Performance: A Study of German and UK Initial Public Offerings, Cheltenham: Edward Elgar Publishing, 183+xii p.
