= Joseph Brebsom =

Luxembourgish politician

Joseph Brebsom (1913 – 12 April 2005) was a Luxembourgish politician.

A member of the Luxembourg Socialist Workers' Party (LSAP), Brebsom spent most of his career in the communal council of Esch-sur-Alzette. He rose to hold position as an échevin (1965–1969, 1970–1978) and Mayor (1978–1990), replacing the Communist Arthur Useldinger. He also sat in the Chamber of Deputies from 1974.

Political offices
Preceded by Arthur Useldinger	Mayor of Esch-sur-Alzette; 1978–1990	Succeeded by François Schaack
