= Arthur Useldinger =

Luxembourgish politician (1904–1978)

Arthur Useldinger (8 July 1904 – 15 March 1978) was a Luxembourgish politician. He was a member of the Communist Party of Luxembourg. Useldinger served two stints as Mayor of Esch-sur-Alzette: one following the end of the Second World War, and one in the 1970s, both in coalition with the Luxembourg Socialist Workers' Party. He is remembered as the most popular of Esch-sur-Alzette's post-war mayors. In addition, Useldinger sat in the national legislature, the Chamber of Deputies for a total of twenty-five years between the war and his death (1945–1958, 1959–1968, 1969–1978)

Arthur Useldinger was the husband of Yvonne Useldinger from 1940 to his death in 1978.

== Footnotes ==
Political offices
Preceded by Hubert Clément	Mayor of Esch-sur-Alzette (1st time); 1945–1949	Succeeded by Michel Rasquin
Preceded by Jules Schreiner	Mayor of Esch-sur-Alzette (2nd time); 1970–1978	Succeeded by Joseph Brebsom
