= Dan Biancalana =

Luxembourgish politician (born 1977)

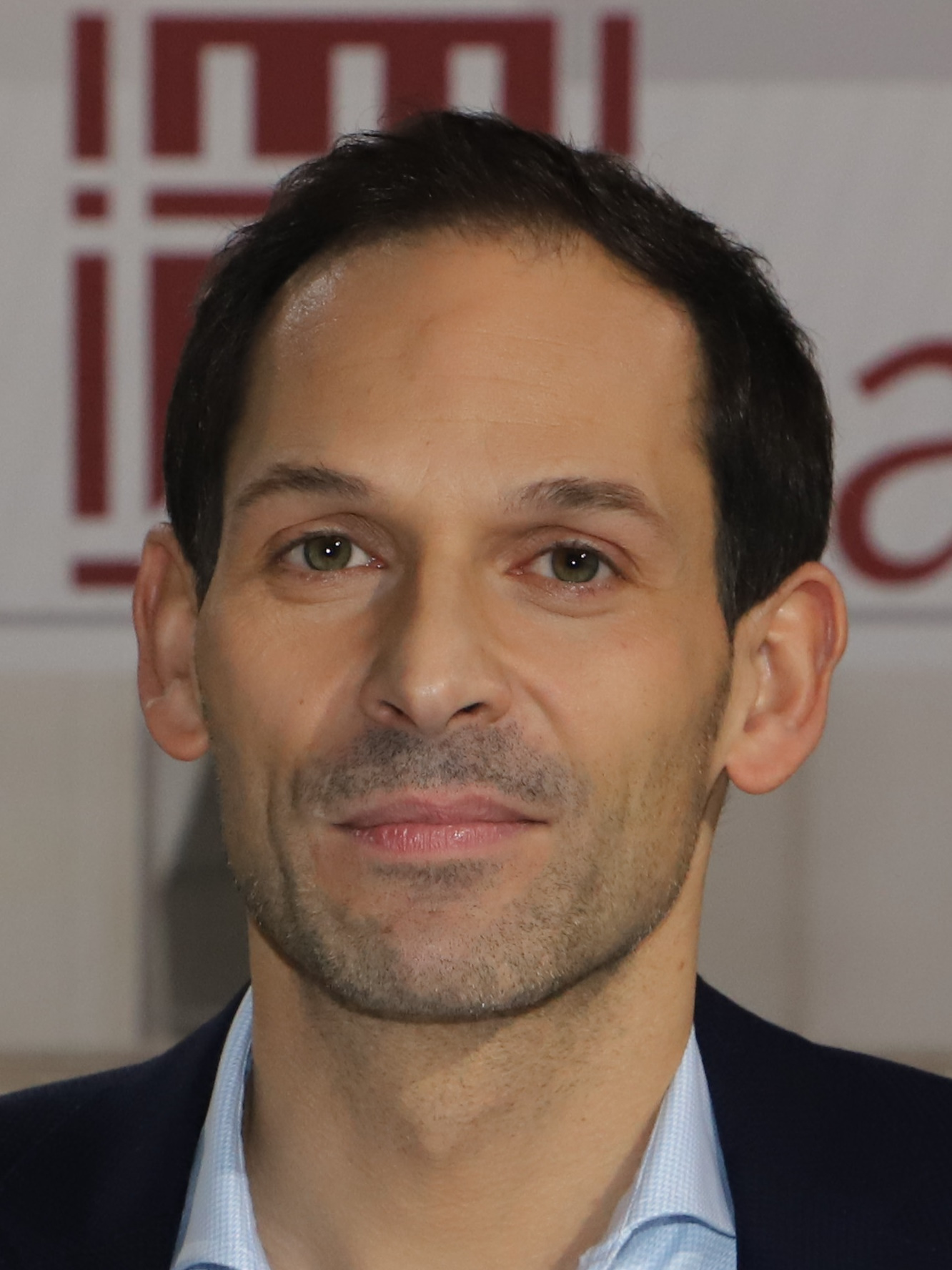
- Biancalana in 2021

Member of the Chamber of Deputies
- Incumbent
- Assumed office 30 October 2018
- Constituency: South

Personal details
- Born: 6 November 1977 (age 48)
- Party: Luxembourg Socialist Workers' Party

Daniel Adriano Biancalana (born 6 November 1977) is a Luxembourgish politician serving as a member of the Chamber of Deputies since 2018. He has served as mayor of Dudelange since 2014, and as co-president of the Luxembourg Socialist Workers' Party since 2023.
