= Marcelle Lentz-Cornette =

Luxembourgish politician (1927-2008)

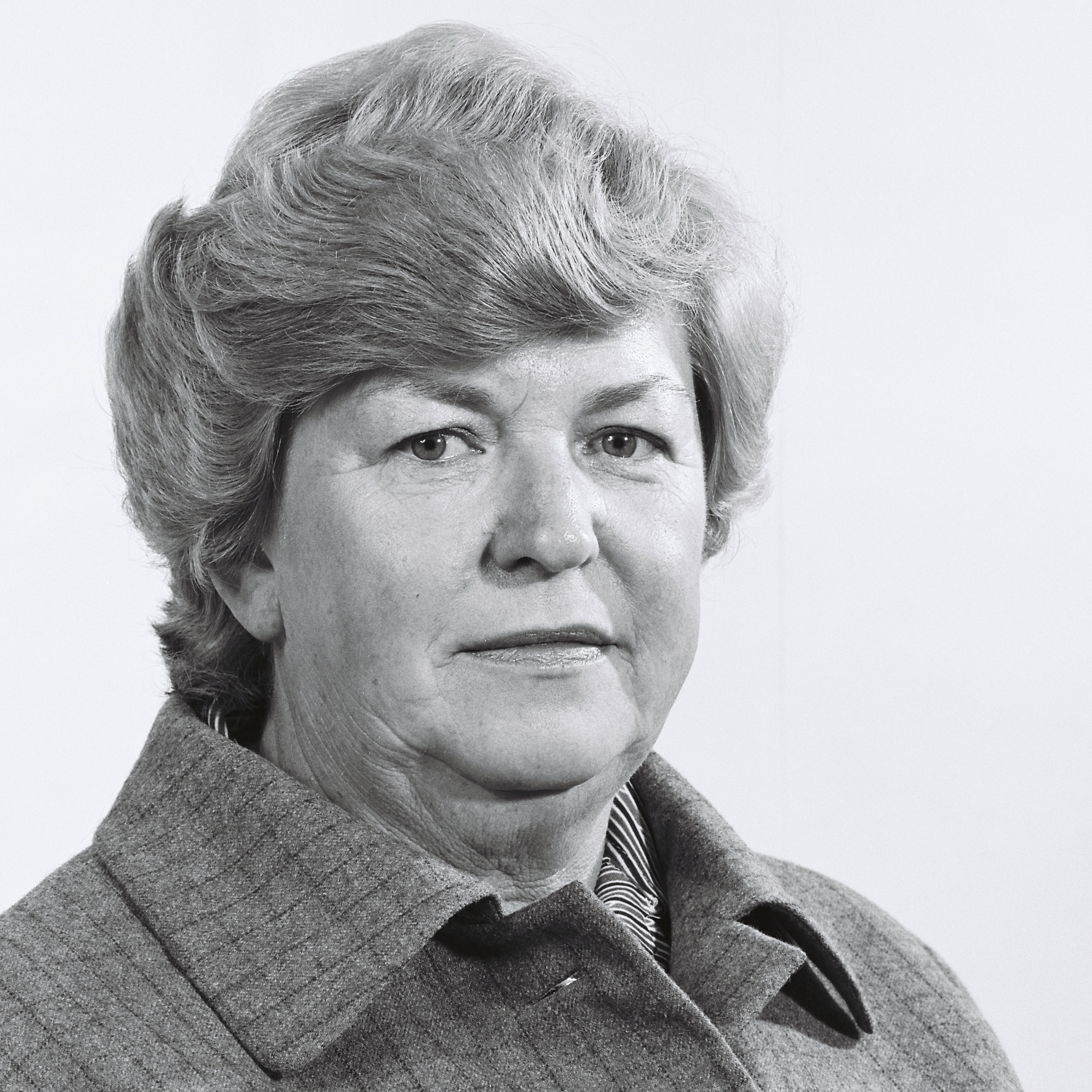
Lentz-Cornette in 1984

Marcelle Clémence Lentz-Cornette (née Cornette; 2 March 1927 – 29 January 2008) was a Luxembourgish politician of the Christian Social People's Party (CSV). Outside politics, she was a schoolteacher.

== Political career ==
Marcelle Clémence Lentz-Cornette was born in Niederkorn, in the southern commune of Differdange. She entered the communal council of Sanem in 1968, the first woman to do so, and remained there until 1985, in addition to holding the position of alderwoman (1970–1980) in the commune's administration. Lentz-Cornette was elected to the Chamber of Deputies in 1979. She served only one term (until 1984), having become one of Luxembourg's six Members of the European Parliament (MEPs) in 1980, replacing Jean Spautz. Lentz-Cornette sat in the European Parliament for two terms, including one full term, until 1989.

She served two more stints in Sanem's communal council (1997–2000, 2001–2003), before retiring.

Beside this, Marcelle Lentz-Cornette dedicated time and personal money to improve health care conditions in Nicaragua.

On 28 September 2013, prime minister Jean-Claude Juncker and Sanem mayor Georges Engel inaugurated a square named after her in the Belval district, Place Marcelle Lentz-Cornette.

== Private life ==
Lentz-Cornette was married to doctor Albert Lentz (1927–2017).
