= Michel Rasquin =

Luxembourgish politician (1899–1958)

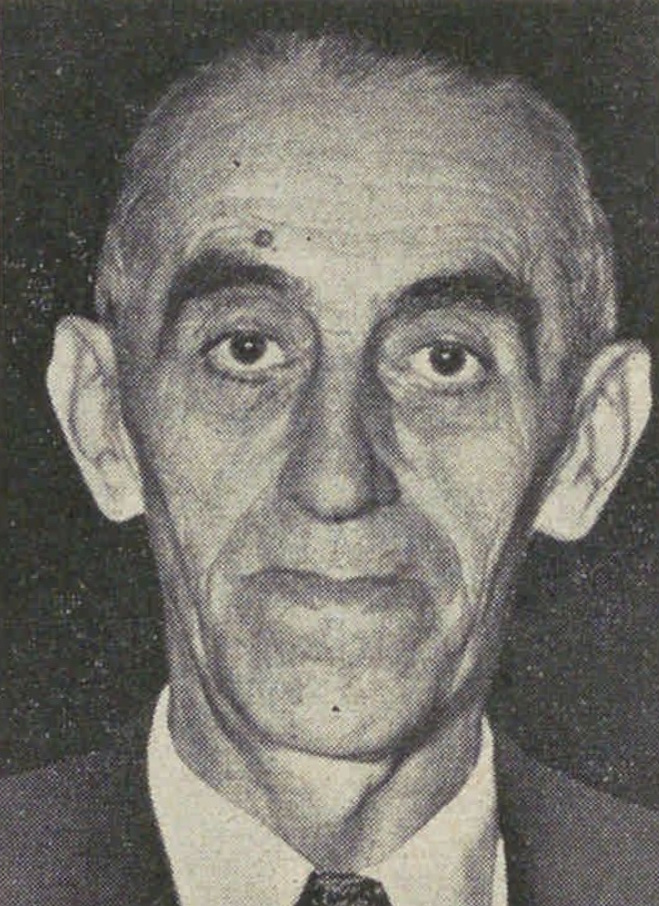
- Rasquin c. 1954

European Commissioner for Transport
- In office 7 January 1958 – 27 April 1958
- President: Walter Hallstein
- Preceded by: Position established
- Succeeded by: Lambert Schaus

Mayor of Esch-sur-Alzette
- In office 1949–1951
- Preceded by: Arthur Useldinger
- Succeeded by: Antoine Krier

Leader of the Luxembourg Socialist Workers' Party
- In office 1945–1951
- Preceded by: Position established
- Succeeded by: Paul Wilwertz

Personal details
- Born: 19 September 1899 Pétange, Luxembourg
- Died: 27 April 1958 (aged 58) Brussels, Belgium
- Party: Luxembourg Socialist Workers' Party

Michel Rasquin (19 September 1899 – 27 April 1958) was a Luxembourgish journalist and socialist politician, and European Commissioner.

Rasquin was born in Pétange, Luxembourg, in 1899. After the Second World War, he was the president of the Luxembourg Socialist Workers' Party from 1945 to 1951.

He was a member of the Council of State, the advisory body, from December 1945 to July 1948. In June 1948, he was elected to the Chamber of Deputies of Luxembourg.

He was Mayor of Esch-sur-Alzette from 1949 to 1951. He represented Luxembourg in the European Parliament during that same time period.

From 1951 to 1958, he was a minister in the coalition governments of Pierre Dupong and Joseph Bech, with responsibility for the economy.

He was appointed Luxembourg's representative on the inaugural European Commission, the Hallstein Commission, which took office in January 1958. Rasquin had responsibility for the Transport portfolio, but died in April 1958 and was succeeded by Lambert Schaus.

Party political offices
New office	Leader of the Luxembourg Socialist Workers' Party; 1945–1951	Succeeded by Paul Wilwertz
Political offices
Preceded by Arthur Useldinger	Mayor of Esch-sur-Alzette; 1949–1951	Succeeded by Antoine Krier
New office	Luxembourgish European Commissioner; 1958	Succeeded by Lambert Schaus
New office	European Commissioner for Transport; 1958	Succeeded by Lambert Schaus
