= René Urbany =

Luxembourgish journalist and politician

René Urbany (7 February 1927 – 10 October 1990) was a Luxembourgish journalist and politician. He was the son of politician Dominique Urbany.

== Early life and education ==
Urbany was born in Beesslek (Hautbellain in French, Oberbesslingen in German), Luxembourg. His father, Dominique Urbany, helped found the Communist Party of Luxembourg (KPL) in 1921. From 1929 to 1965 Dominique Urbany was Secretary General of the KPL, and from 1965 to 1976 he was the party's president. The senior Urbany was a member of Luxembourg's Parliament between 1945 and 1975.

== Career ==
Urbany became a member of the Central Committee of the KPL in 1948, and in 1952 became a member of the party's Politburo or Executive Committee. In 1946 he became editor-in-chief at the party newspaper, Lëtzebuerger Vollek, and in 1969 became director of the party's publishing house COPE (Cooperative Ouvrière de Presse et d'Editions). He was director of the newspaper from 1970 to 1990.

From 1966 to 1979, and again in 1988–89, he was a member of the Municipal Council of the City of Luxembourg. From 1975 to 1990 he was also a member of the Luxembourg Parliament, or Chamber of Deputies, and spokesman for the KPL fraction.

After his father's death, René Urbany took over as President of the KPL in December 1976, a post he held until his death in 1990. He was a member of Luxembourg's Chamber of Deputies from 1975 to 1990.

In 1987 his book Dem Här an de Frack gegraff. Mit spitzer Feder gegen Obskurantismus, Heuchelei und Unverstand was published by COPE.
