= François Colling =

Luxembourgish politician (1940–2024)

Member of the Chamber of Deputies of Luxembourg
- In office 10 June 1979 – 13 June 1999

Personal details
- Born: 5 March 1940 Esch-sur-Alzette, Luxembourg
- Died: 18 October 2024 (aged 84)
- Party: CSV
- Education: ETH Zurich
- Occupation: Engineer

François Colling (5 March 1940 – 18 October 2024) was a Luxembourgish engineer and politician. A member of the Christian Social People's Party, he served in the Chamber of Deputies from 1979 to 1999.

Colling died on 18 October 2024, at the age of 84.
