= Marc Baum =

Luxembourgish actor (born 1978)

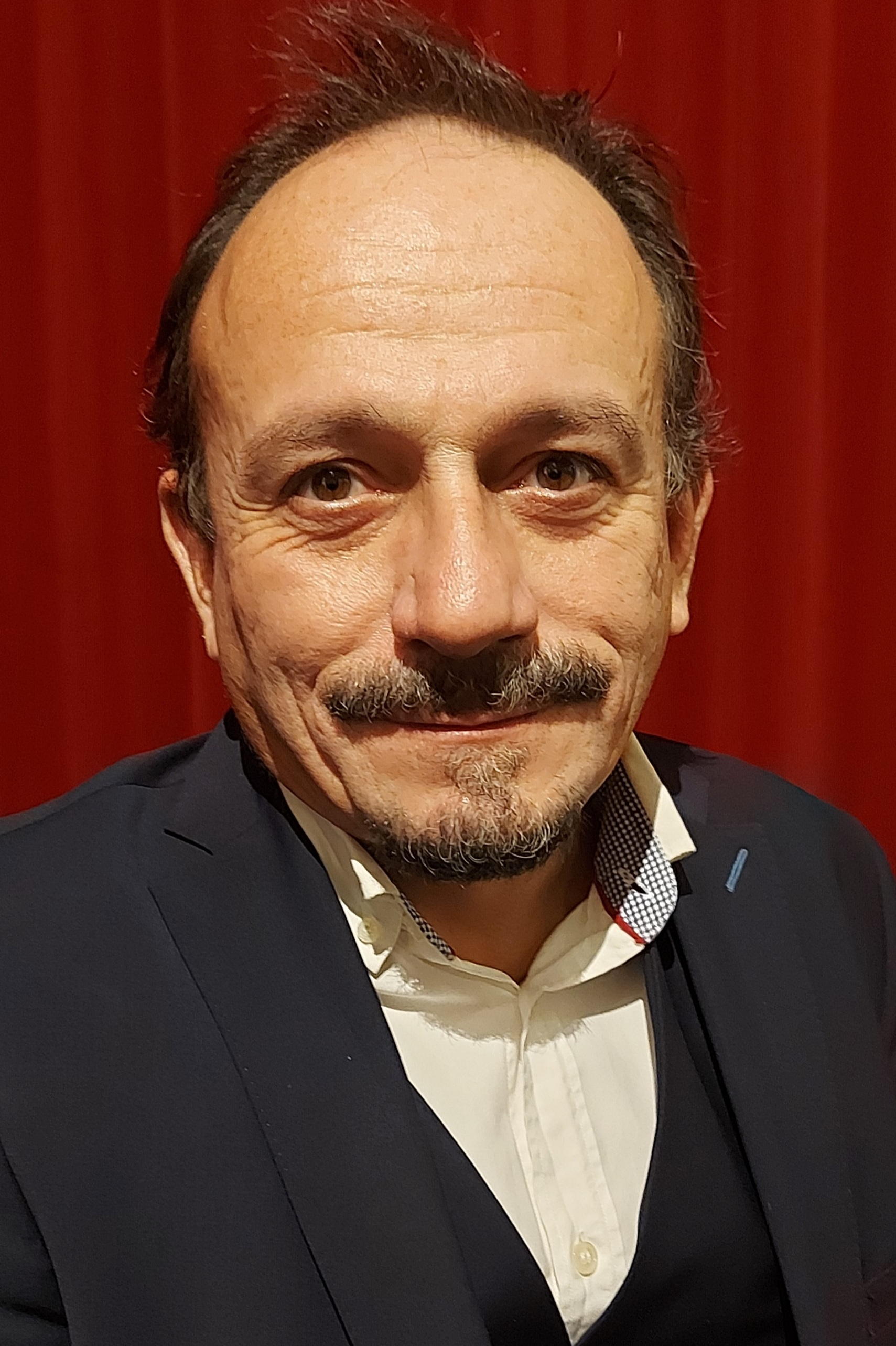
Baum in 2025

Marc Baum (born 11 June 1978) is a Luxembourgish actor and politician from The Left.

== Career ==
Baum starred as Olif in the 2004 film Venezuela and Heinrich Heißsporn is the 2006 film Full Stuff. Since the 2018 general election in Luxembourg, Baum has sat in the Chamber of Deputies as one of the two déi Lénk Deputies.
