= 1994 Luxembourg general election =

- 12 June 1994
- All 60 seats in the Chamber of Deputies; 31 seats were needed for a majority
- Turnout: 88.30% (▲0.91 pp)
Party	Leader	Vote %	Seats	+/–
CSV	Jacques Santer	29.71	21	−1
LSAP	Jacques Poos	26.70	17	−1
DP	Lydie Polfer	18.35	12	+1
GAP/GLEI	Jup Weber	10.18	5	+1
ADR	Gast Gibéryen	8.17	5	+1
This lists parties that won seats. See the complete results below.
Most voted-for party by municipality and constituency
Prime Minister before	Prime Minister after
Jacques Santer; CSV	Jacques Santer; CSV

General elections were held in Luxembourg on 12 June 1994, alongside European Parliament elections. The Christian Social People's Party remained the largest party, winning 21 of the 60 seats in the Chamber of Deputies. It continued the coalition government with the Luxembourg Socialist Workers' Party.

== Candidates ==
List #	Party	Running in				Existing seats
List #	Party	Centre	Est	Nord	Sud	Existing seats
1	Luxembourg Socialist Workers' Party (LSAP)					18
2	National Movement					0
3	Green List Ecological Initiative–Green Alternative Party (GAP/GLEI)					4
4	Christian Social People's Party (CSV)					21
5	Action Committee for Democracy and Pensions Justice (ADR)					4
6	Communist Party (KPL)					0
7	Democratic Party (DP)					12
8	Group for the Sovereignty of Luxembourg (GLS)					0
9	New Left					0
10	Neutral and Independent Human Rights Party (NOMP)					0
11	Luxembourg Association for an Improved Future (ALFA)					0
12	Party for Regional and Real Politics (PRP)					0

== Results ==
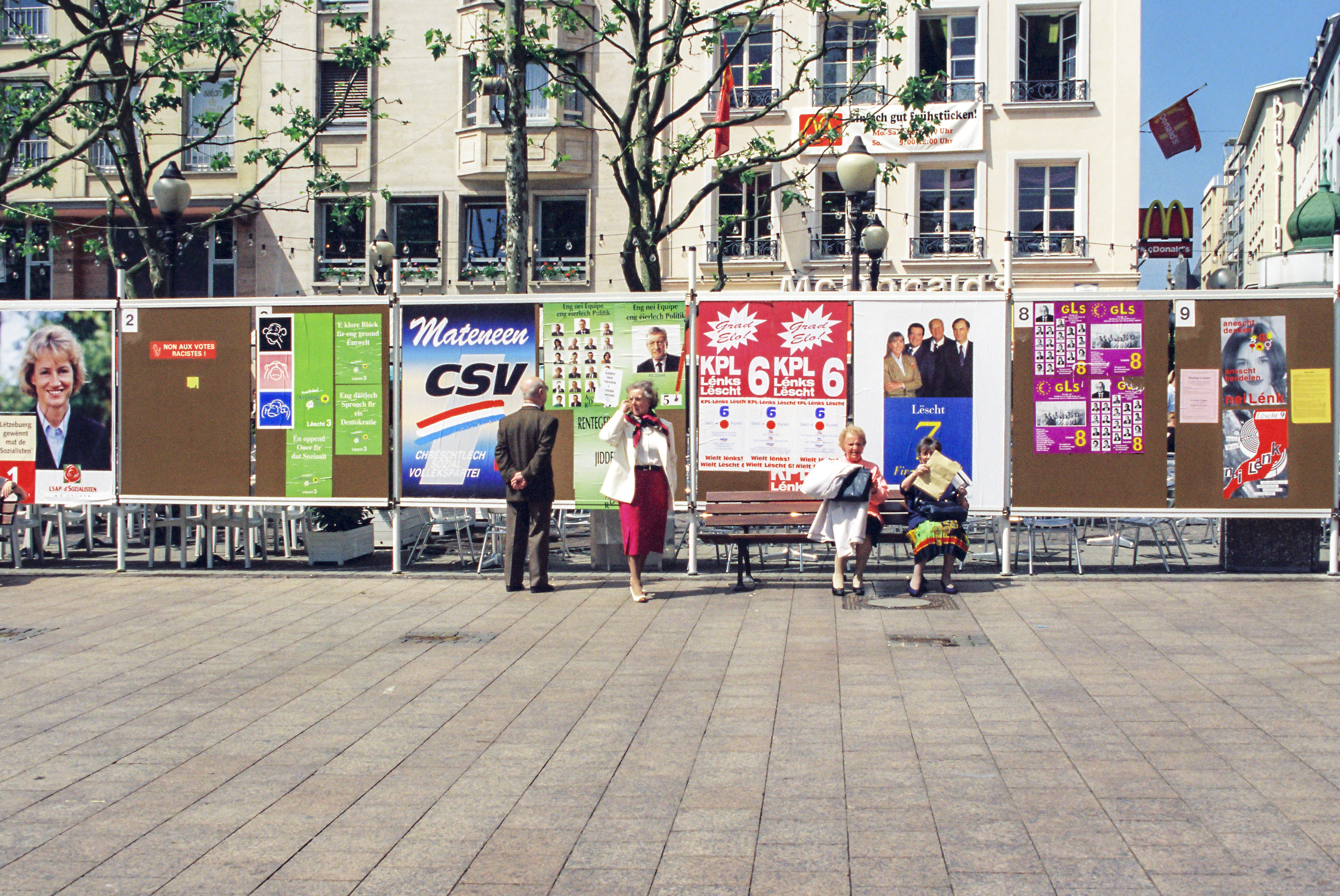
Election posters on Place d'Armes in Luxembourg City

Party	Votes	%	Seats	+/–
Christian Social People's Party	887,651	29.71	21	–1
Luxembourg Socialist Workers' Party	797,540	26.70	17	–1
Democratic Party	548,246	18.35	12	+1
Green List Ecological Initiative–Green Alternative Party	303,991	10.18	5	+1
Action Committee for Democracy and Pensions Justice	244,045	8.17	5	+1
National Movement	82,581	2.76	0	0
Communist Party of Luxembourg	57,646	1.93	0	–1
New Left	25,940	0.87	0	New
Neutral and Independent Human Rights Party	18,843	0.63	0	New
Group for the Sovereignty of Luxembourg	16,160	0.54	0	New
Party for Regional and Real Politics	3,675	0.12	0	New
Luxembourg Association for an Improved Future	1,235	0.04	0	New
Total	2,987,553	100.00	60	0
Valid votes	179,276	93.51		
Invalid/blank votes	12,448	6.49		
Total votes	191,724	100.00		
Registered voters/turnout	217,131	88.30		
Source: Government of Luxembourg

=== By locality ===
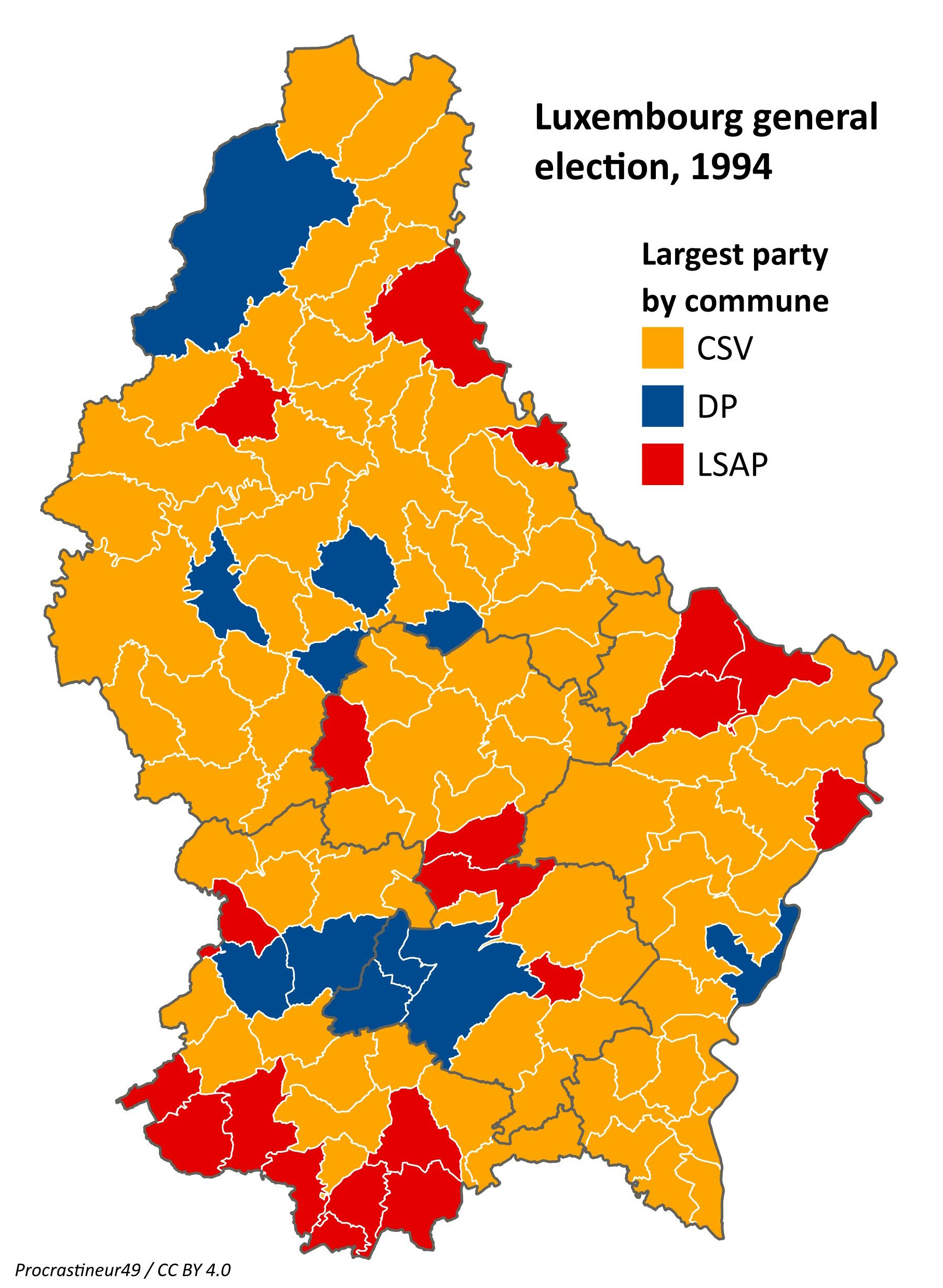
The CSV (orange) won most of the countryside, whilst the LSAP (red) won the major towns in the Red Lands and the DP (light blue) won Luxembourg City and its western suburbs.

The CSV won pluralities in three of the four circonscriptions, coming behind the LSAP in that party's Sud stronghold. The CSV's vote was remarkably consistent across the whole of the country, whereas the other two main parties' votes varied wildly (particularly in Sud). The Greens and ADR won disproportionate number of votes in the east-central region and north respectively.

	CSV	LSAP	DP	Greens	ADR	KPL	Other
Centre	29.2%	18.9%	27.1%	10.7%	7.8%	1.1%	5.2%
Est	32.6%	23.1%	21.3%	9.1%	11.4%	0.6%	2.1%
Nord	33.2%	19.1%	22.8%	8.4%	13.9%	0.8%	1.8%
Sud	29.3%	33.5%	11.6%	10.2%	7.1%	2.8%	5.6%

The CSV won pluralities across most of the country, winning more votes than any other party in 86 of the country's (then) 118 communes. The LSAP won pluralities in 21 communes, primarily in the Red Lands in the south. The DP won 12 communes, particularly in its heartland of Luxembourg City and the surrounding communes.
