= 1989 Luxembourg general election =

- 18 June 1989
- All 60 seats in the Chamber of Deputies; 31 seats were needed for a majority
- Turnout: 87.39% (▼1.42 pp)
Party	Leader	Vote %	Seats	+/–
CSV	Jacques Santer	31.67	22	−3
LSAP	Jacques Poos	27.23	18	−3
DP	Colette Flesch	16.17	11	−3
ADR	Gast Gibéryen	7.31	4	New
KPL	René Urbany	5.11	1	−1
GLEI		4.21	2	New
GAP	Jean Huss	4.15	2	0
This lists parties that won seats. See the complete results below.
Most voted-for party by municipality and constituency
Prime Minister before	Prime Minister after
Jacques Santer; CSV	Jacques Santer; CSV

General elections were held in Luxembourg on 18 June 1989. The Christian Social People's Party remained the largest party, winning 22 of the 60 seats in the Chamber of Deputies. It continued the coalition government with the Luxembourg Socialist Workers' Party.

== Results ==
Party	Votes	%	Seats	+/–
Christian Social People's Party	974,530	31.67	22	–3
Luxembourg Socialist Workers' Party	837,887	27.23	18	–3
Democratic Party	497,631	16.17	11	–3
Action Committee 5/6ths Pensions for Everyone	225,044	7.31	4	New
Communist Party of Luxembourg	157,265	5.11	1	–1
Green List Ecological Initiative	129,504	4.21	2	New
Green Alternative Party	127,607	4.15	2	0
National Movement	82,009	2.66	0	New
Ecological List for the North (Note: A joint list of the Green Alternative Party, the Green List Ecological Initiative and some independent candidates which ran in the north constituency.)	16,649	0.54	0	New
RSP Against Racism and Fascism	8,229	0.27	0	New
Republican Party	8,106	0.26	0	New
Moderate Luxembourg Christian People's Democrats	5,807	0.19	0	New
List for the Eislecker and a Regional Policy	4,013	0.13	0	New
Why Not?	1,413	0.05	0	New
Citizens Party	871	0.03	0	New
Green Alternative Alliance	849	0.03	0	New
Total	3,077,414	100.00	60	–4
Valid votes	180,733	94.46		
Invalid/blank votes	10,599	5.54		
Total votes	191,332	100.00		
Registered voters/turnout	218,940	87.39		
Source: Government of Luxembourg
