= Centre (Chamber of Deputies of Luxembourg constituency) =

Constituency of the Chamber of Deputies, the national legislature of Luxembourg

- Zentrum; Centre; Zentrum
- Constituency for the Chamber of Deputies
- Location of Centre within Luxembourg
- Canton: Luxembourg; Mersch
- Population: 250,957 (2026)
- Electorate: 81,687 (2023)
- Area: 462 km^{2} (2018)

Current Constituency
- Created: 1919
- Seats: List: 21 (1989–present); 23 (1984–1989); 20 (1974–1984); 18 (1964–1974); 16 (1951–1964); 15 (1937–1951); 14 (1931–1937); 13 (1919–1931)
- Deputies: List: Diane Adehm (CSV); Guy Arendt (DP); Maurice Bauer (CSV); François Bausch (DG); Simone Beissel (DP); Corinne Cahen (DP); Sven Clement (PPLU); Francine Closener (LSAP); Claire Delcourt (LSAP); Alex Donnersbach (CSV); Franz Fayot (LSAP); Paul Galles (CSV); Patrick Goldschmidt (DP); Marc Lies (CSV); Laurent Mosar (CSV); Lydie Polfer (DP); Gérard Schockmel (DP); Sam Tanson (DG); David Wagner (DL); Tom Weidig (ADR); Claude Wiseler (CSV)
- Created from: List: Luxembourg City; Luxembourg Rural; Mersch

Centre (Luxembourgish: Zentrum; French: Centre; German: Zentrum) is one of the four multi-member constituencies of the Chamber of Deputies, the national legislature of Luxembourg. The constituency was established in 1919 following the introduction of proportional representation for elections to the Chamber of Deputies. It consists of the cantons of Luxembourg and Mersch. The constituency currently elects 21 of the 60 members of the Chamber of Deputies using the open party-list proportional representation electoral system. At the 2023 general election it had 81,687 registered electors.

== Electoral system ==
Centre currently elects 21 of the 60 members of the Chamber of Deputies using the open party-list proportional representation electoral system. Electors votes for candidates rather than parties and may cast as many votes as the number of deputies to be elected from the constituency. They may vote for an entire party list or individual candidates and may cast up to two votes for an individual candidate. If the party list contains fewer candidates than the number of deputies to be elected, the elector may vote for candidates from other lists as long as their total number of votes does not exceed the number of deputies to be elected. The ballot paper is invalidated if the elector cast more votes than the number of deputies to be elected from the constituency. Split-ticket voting (panachage) is permitted.

The votes received by each party's candidates are aggregated and seats are allocated to each party using the Hagenbach-Bischoff quota.

== Election results ==
=== Summary ===
Election	Communists KPL / ABP			Left DL / NL / RSP / LCR			Socialist Workers LSAP / LAP / SP			Greens DG / GLEI-GAP / GAP			Democrats DP / GD / GPD / RLP RSP / VL / LDL / RL			Christian Social People CSV / RP			Alternative Democratic Reform ADR / 5/6		
Election	Votes	%	Seats	Votes	%	Seats	Votes	%	Seats	Votes	%	Seats	Votes	%	Seats	Votes	%	Seats	Votes	%	Seats
2023	5,431	0.43%	0	49,481	3.94%	1	148,046	11.79%	3	144,834	11.53%	2	317,194	25.26%	6	376,078	29.95%	7	82,230	6.55%	1
2018	8,448	0.73%	0	66,253	5.72%	1	135,968	11.73%	2	187,790	16.20%	4	280,144	24.17%	5	337,687	29.14%	7	79,159	6.83%	1
2013	9,422	0.86%	0	51,859	4.75%	1	159,875	14.65%	3	114,142	10.46%	2	273,092	25.02%	6	385,405	35.31%	8	54,709	5.01%	1
2009	11,038	1.09%	0	35,408	3.50%	0	180,110	17.82%	4	133,490	13.21%	3	196,556	19.45%	4	390,087	38.60%	9	63,791	6.31%	1
2004	8,582	0.83%	0	19,448	1.89%	0	193,327	18.80%	4	140,548	13.67%	3	219,700	21.37%	5	365,364	35.53%	8	81,233	7.90%	1
1999				27,999	2.82%	0	171,116	17.22%	4	95,977	9.66%	2	298,629	30.06%	7	278,580	28.04%	6	94,343	9.50%	2
1994	11,672	1.13%	0				195,076	18.87%	4	110,654	10.70%	2	280,194	27.11%	6	301,192	29.14%	7	81,458	7.88%	2
1989	35,725	3.24%	0				215,697	19.56%	5	45,530	4.13%	1	266,981	24.21%	6	344,500	31.24%	7	83,021	7.53%	1
1984	35,191	2.90%	0	2,639	0.22%	0	307,584	25.38%	6	73,088	6.03%	1	314,742	25.97%	7	437,313	36.08%	9			
1979	28,766	2.63%	0	2,517	0.23%	0	195,831	17.89%	4				328,503	30.01%	7	407,916	37.26%	8			
1974	54,782	5.10%	1	5,518	0.51%	0	252,208	23.48%	5				370,193	34.46%	7	296,450	27.60%	6			
1968	84,056	9.42%	1				252,839	28.33%	5				224,919	25.20%	5	326,056	36.53%	7			
1964	80,569	8.95%	1				303,417	33.72%	6				148,785	16.54%	3	306,959	34.12%	7			
1959	32,143	3.97%	0				250,024	30.85%	5				224,171	27.66%	5	304,064	37.52%	6			
1954	27,165	3.45%	0				265,337	33.70%	6				137,158	17.42%	3	333,085	42.30%	7			
1951	30,613	4.05%	0				301,640	39.90%	7				149,136	19.73%	3	274,679	36.33%	6			
1945	56,710	8.25%	1				177,051	25.76%	4				177,801	25.87%	4	273,754	39.83%	6			
1937							186,056	30.49%	5				99,029	16.23%	2	223,153	36.57%	6			
1931	6,264	1.29%	0				115,882	23.92%	3				78,464	16.20%	2	185,144	38.21%	6			
1925							53,437	12.54%	1				133,747	31.38%	5	153,969	36.12%	5			
1922	6,976	1.81%	0				49,084	12.75%	1				162,790	42.29%	6	166,084	43.15%	6			
1919							83,151	20.85%	3				121,598	30.49%	4	180,545	45.27%	6			

=== Detailed ===
==== 2020s ====
===== 2023 =====
Results of the 2023 general election held on 8 October 2023:

Party		Votes	%	Seats
Christian Social People's Party	CSV	376,078	29.95%	7
Democratic Party	DP	317,194	25.26%	6
Luxembourg Socialist Workers' Party	LSAP	148,046	11.79%	3
The Greens	DG	144,834	11.53%	2
Alternative Democratic Reform Party	ADR	82,230	6.55%	1
Pirate Party Luxembourg	PPLU	81,668	6.50%	1
The Left	DL	49,481	3.94%	1
Focus	FOK	34,323	2.73%	0
Liberty – Freedom!	LF	16,535	1.32%	0
Communist Party of Luxembourg	KPL	5,431	0.43%	0
Total		1,255,820	100.00%	21
Valid votes		64,114		
Blank votes		1,578	2.30%	
Rejected votes – other		2,923	4.26%	
Total polled		68,615	84.00%	
Registered electors		81,687		

The following candidates were elected: Diane Adehm (CSV), 19,043 votes; Yuriko Backes (DP), 23,589 votes; François Bausch (DG), 12,605 votes; Simone Beissel (DP), 14,895 votes; Xavier Bettel (DP), 34,018 votes; Corinne Cahen (DP), 16,365 votes; Sven Clement (PPLU), 15,074 votes; Francine Closener (LSAP), 11,392 votes; Claire Delcourt (LSAP), 7,394 votes; Franz Fayot (LSAP), 13,343 votes; Luc Frieden (CSV), 30,999 votes; Paul Galles (CSV), 21,495 votes; Marc Lies (CSV), 18,862 votes; Elisabeth Margue (CSV), 23,166 votes; Lydie Polfer (DP), 19,345 votes; Gérard Schockmel (DP), 15,164 votes; Sam Tanson (DG), 17,983 votes; David Wagner (DL), 6,747 votes; Tom Weidig (ADR), 6,414 votes; Serge Wilmes (CSV), 22,035 votes; and Claude Wiseler (CSV), 21,385 votes.

==== 2010s ====
===== 2018 =====
Results of the 2018 general election held on 14 October 2018:

Party		Votes	%	Seats
Christian Social People's Party	CSV	337,689	29.14%	7
Democratic Party	DP	280,143	24.17%	5
The Greens	DG	187,797	16.20%	4
Luxembourg Socialist Workers' Party	LSAP	135,967	11.73%	2
Alternative Democratic Reform Party	ADR	79,159	6.83%	1
The Left	DL	66,253	5.72%	1
Pirate Party Luxembourg	PPLU	59,539	5.14%	1
Communist Party of Luxembourg	KPL	8,448	0.73%	0
Democracy		3,953	0.34%	0
Total		1,158,948	100.00%	21
Valid votes		59,218		
Blank votes		1,586	2.50%	
Rejected votes – other		2,684	4.23%	
Total polled		63,488	86.99%	
Registered electors		72,986		

The following candidates were elected: Diane Adehm (CSV), 18,010 votes; Marc Angel (LSAP), 10,260 votes; Guy Arendt (DP), 13,931 votes; François Bausch (DG), 19,887 votes; Simone Beissel (DP), 14,630 votes; François Benoy (DG), 9,830 votes; Xavier Bettel (DP), 30,774 votes; Corinne Cahen (DP), 19,471 votes; Sven Clement (PPLU), 8,007 votes; Paul Galles (CSV), 16,942 votes; Marc Lies (CSV), 17,573 votes; Charles Margue (DG), 9,515 votes; Laurent Mosar (CSV), 17,210 votes; Lydie Polfer (DP), 18,934 votes; Roy Reding (ADR), 6,319 votes; Viviane Reding (CSV), 17,922 votes; Etienne Schneider (LSAP), 16,871 votes; Sam Tanson (DG), 17,290 votes; David Wagner (DL), 8,988 votes; Serge Wilmes (CSV), 20,809 votes; and Claude Wiseler (CSV), 27,388 votes.

===== 2013 =====
Results of the 2013 general election held on 20 October 2013:

Party		Votes	%	Seats
Christian Social People's Party	CSV	385,405	35.31%	8
Democratic Party	DP	273,092	25.02%	6
Luxembourg Socialist Workers' Party	LSAP	159,875	14.65%	3
The Greens	DG	114,142	10.46%	2
Alternative Democratic Reform Party	ADR	54,709	5.01%	1
The Left	DL	51,859	4.75%	1
Pirate Party Luxembourg	PPLU	29,631	2.71%	0
Party for Full Democracy	PID	13,318	1.22%	0
Communist Party of Luxembourg	KPL	9,422	0.86%	0
Total		1,091,453	100.00%	21
Valid votes		56,600		
Blank votes		1,509	2.50%	
Rejected votes – other		2,363	3.91%	
Total polled		60,472	89.95%	
Registered electors		67,232		

The following candidates were elected: Diane Adehm (CSV), 18,665 votes; Marc Angel (LSAP), 10,465 votes; François Bausch (DG), 11,598 votes; Simone Beissel (DP), 14,477 votes; Xavier Bettel (DP), 32,064 votes; Anne Brasseur (DP), 17,641 votes; Corinne Cahen (DP), 13,829 votes; Franz Fayot (LSAP), 8,468 votes; Luc Frieden (CSV), 29,441 votes; Alex Krieps (DP), 12,989 votes; Marc Lies (CSV), 18,167 votes; Viviane Loschetter (DG), 8,535 votes; Paul-Henri Meyers (CSV), 19,162 votes; Laurent Mosar (CSV), 21,495 votes; Marcel Oberweis (CSV), 18,400 votes; Lydie Polfer (DP), 18,637 votes; Roy Reding (ADR), 5,622 votes; Etienne Schneider (LSAP), 19,682 votes; Justin Turpel (DL), 3,737 votes; Serge Wilmes (CSV), 18,949 votes; and Claude Wiseler (CSV), 26,590 votes.

==== 2000s ====
===== 2009 =====
Results of the 2009 general election held on 7 June 2009:

Party		Votes	%	Seats
Christian Social People's Party	CSV	390,087	38.60%	9
Democratic Party	DP	196,556	19.45%	4
Luxembourg Socialist Workers' Party	LSAP	180,110	17.82%	4
The Greens	DG	133,490	13.21%	3
Alternative Democratic Reform Party	ADR	63,791	6.31%	1
The Left	DL	35,408	3.50%	0
Communist Party of Luxembourg	KPL	11,038	1.09%	0
Total		1,010,480	100.00%	21
Valid votes		52,811		
Blank votes		1,687	3.00%	
Rejected votes – other		1,748	3.11%	
Total polled		56,246	88.73%	
Registered electors		63,391		

The following candidates were elected: Claude Adam (DG), 9,161 votes; François Bausch (DG), 17,510 votes; Xavier Bettel (DP), 19,671 votes; Anne Brasseur (DP), 16,692 votes; Mady Delvaux-Stehres (LSAP), 14,585 votes; Ben Fayot (LSAP), 13,922 votes; Luc Frieden (CSV), 41,889 votes; Paul Helminger (DP), 16,223 votes; Jacques-Yves Henckes (ADR), 6,158 votes; Jean-Pierre Klein (LSAP), 9,820 votes; Jeannot Krecké (LSAP), 25,650 votes; Viviane Loschetter (DG), 10,097 votes; Mill Majerus (CSV), 16,620 votes; Martine Mergen (CSV), 18,454 votes; Paul-Henri Meyers (CSV), 18,146 votes; Laurent Mosar (CSV), 22,116 votes; Marcel Oberweis (CSV), 18,057 votes; Lydie Polfer (DP), 16,402 votes; Jean-Louis Schiltz (CSV), 23,927 votes; Lucien Thiel (CSV), 20,799 votes; and Claude Wiseler (CSV), 31,649 votes.

===== 2004 =====
Results of the 2004 general election held on 13 June 2004:

Party		Votes	%	Seats
Christian Social People's Party	CSV	365,364	35.53%	8
Democratic Party	DP	219,700	21.37%	5
Luxembourg Socialist Workers' Party	LSAP	193,327	18.80%	4
The Greens	DG	140,548	13.67%	3
Alternative Democratic Reform Party	ADR	81,233	7.90%	1
The Left	DL	19,448	1.89%	0
Communist Party of Luxembourg	KPL	8,582	0.83%	0
Total		1,028,202	100.00%	21
Valid votes		53,556		
Blank votes		1,533	2.70%	
Rejected votes – other		1,623	2.86%	
Total polled		56,712	89.88%	
Registered electors		63,099		

The following candidates were elected: Claude Adam (DG), 7,339 votes; François Bausch (DG), 19,502 votes; Xavier Bettel (DP), 12,069 votes; Niki Bettendorf (DP), 12,332 votes; Anne Brasseur (DP), 19,355 votes; Mady Delvaux-Stehres (LSAP), 14,298 votes; Ben Fayot (LSAP), 12,531 votes; Colette Flesch (DP), 11,924 votes; Luc Frieden (CSV), 41,908 votes; Marie-Thérèse Gantenbein-Koullen (CSV), 16,428 votes; Robert Goebbels (LSAP), 14,175 votes; Jacques-Yves Henckes (ADR), 7,502 votes; Erna Hennicot-Schoepges (CSV), 17,536 votes; Jeannot Krecké (LSAP), 19,391 votes; Viviane Loschetter (DG), 10,434 votes; Paul-Henri Meyers (CSV), 17,061 votes; Laurent Mosar (CSV), 20,993 votes; Lydie Polfer (DP), 28,206 votes; Jean-Louis Schiltz (CSV), 16,357 votes; Lucien Thiel (CSV), 16,646 votes; and Claude Wiseler (CSV), 26,009 votes.

==== 1990s ====
===== 1999 =====
Results of the 1999 general election held on 13 June 1999:

Party		Votes	%	Seats
Democratic Party	DP	298,629	30.06%	7
Christian Social People's Party	CSV	278,580	28.04%	6
Luxembourg Socialist Workers' Party	LSAP	171,116	17.22%	4
The Greens	DG	95,977	9.66%	2
Action Committee for Democracy and Pensions Justice	ADR	94,343	9.50%	2
The Left	DL	27,999	2.82%	0
Green and Liberal Alliance	GaL	14,232	1.43%	0
The Taxpayer		12,543	1.26%	0
Total		993,419	100.00%	21
Valid votes		51,913		
Blank votes		1,984	3.58%	
Rejected votes – other		1,575	2.84%	
Total polled		55,472	87.53%	
Registered electors		63,378		

The following candidates were elected: François Bausch (DG), 9,304 votes; Niki Bettendorf (DP), 18,047 votes; Willy Bourg (CSV), 15,155 votes; Anne Brasseur (DP), 19,564 votes; Mady Delvaux-Stehres (LSAP), 13,537 votes; Ben Fayot (LSAP), 10,898 votes; Colette Flesch (DP), 17,515 votes; Luc Frieden (CSV), 24,701 votes; Robert Goebbels (LSAP), 18,207 votes; Fernand Greisen (ADR), 5,524 votes; Paul Helminger (DP), 16,914 votes; Jacques-Yves Henckes (ADR), 7,961 votes; Erna Hennicot-Schoepges (CSV), 15,469 votes; Jeannot Krecké (LSAP), 15,436 votes; Alex Krieps (DP), 14,794 votes; Lydie Polfer (DP), 28,469 votes; Jean-Paul Rippinger (DP), 14,372 votes; Viviane Reding (CSV), 14,778 votes; Alphonse Theis (CSV), 15,647 votes; Renée Wagener (DG), 9,686 votes; and Claude Wiseler (CSV), 14,515 votes.

===== 1994 =====
Results of the 1994 general election held on 12 June 1994:

Party		Votes	%	Seats
Christian Social People's Party	CSV	301,192	29.14%	7
Democratic Party	DP	280,194	27.11%	6
Luxembourg Socialist Workers' Party	LSAP	195,076	18.87%	4
The Greens	GLEI-GAP	110,654	10.70%	2
Action Committee for Democracy and Pensions Justice	ADR	81,458	7.88%	2
National Movement	NB	24,615	2.38%	0
Group for the Sovereignty of Luxembourg	GLS	16,160	1.56%	0
Communist Party of Luxembourg	KPL	11,672	1.13%	0
Neutral and Independent Human Rights Party	NOMP	8,980	0.87%	0
Party for Regional and Real Politics	PRP	3,675	0.36%	0
Total		1,033,676	100.00%	21
Valid votes		53,696		
Blank votes		1,979	3.45%	
Rejected votes – other		1,639	2.86%	
Total polled		57,314	86.98%	
Registered electors		65,897		

The following candidates were elected: Niki Bettendorf (DP), 16,174 votes; Willy Bourg (CSV), 18,530 votes; Anne Brasseur (DP), 18,156 votes; Mady Delvaux-Stehres (LSAP), 18,641 votes; Ben Fayot (LSAP), 12,586 votes; Marc Fischbach (CSV), 17,519 votes; Colette Flesch (DP), 19,352 votes; Raymond Gibéryen (ADR), 5,718 votes; Robert Goebbels (LSAP), 16,159 votes; Paul Helminger (DP), 15,795 votes; Jacques-Yves Henckes (ADR), 5,354 votes; Erna Hennicot-Schoepges (CSV), 22,321 votes; Jeannot Krecké (LSAP), 13,694 votes; Astrid Lulling (CSV), 15,790 votes; Carlo Meintz (DP), 15,814 votes; Paul-Henri Meyers (CSV), 14,259 votes; Lydie Polfer (DP), 26,708 votes; Jacques Santer (CSV), 25,992 votes; Alphonse Theis (CSV), 16,002 votes; Renée Wagener (GLEI-GAP), 7,322 votes; and Jup Weber (GLEI-GAP), 14,247 votes.

==== 1980s ====
===== 1989 =====
Results of the 1989 general election held on 18 June 1989:

Party		Votes	%	Seats
Christian Social People's Party	CSV	344,500	31.24%	7
Democratic Party	DP	266,981	24.21%	6
Luxembourg Socialist Workers' Party	LSAP	215,697	19.56%	5
Action Committee 5/6 Pensions for Everyone	5/6	83,021	7.53%	1
Green List Ecological Initiative	GLEI	64,992	5.89%	1
Green Alternative Party	GAP	45,530	4.13%	1
Communist Party of Luxembourg	KPL	35,725	3.24%	0
National Movement	NB	30,847	2.80%	0
Republican Party	RP	8,106	0.74%	0
Moderate Luxembourg Christian People's Democrats		5,807	0.53%	0
Why Not?		1,413	0.13%	0
Total		1,102,619	100.00%	21
Valid votes		56,349		
Blank votes		1,796	3.01%	
Rejected votes – other		1,446	2.43%	
Total polled		59,591	85.88%	
Registered electors		69,385		

The following candidates were elected: Thers Bodé (GAP), 3,749 votes; Willy Bourg (CSV), 18,856 votes; Anne Brasseur (DP), 16,835 votes; Mady Delvaux-Stehres (LSAP), 17,245 votes; Ben Fayot (LSAP), 13,394 votes; Marc Fischbach (CSV), 21,511 votes; Colette Flesch (DP), 25,592 votes; Pierre Frieden (CSV), 17,117 votes; Robert Goebbels (LSAP), 14,944 votes; René Hengel (LSAP), 13,617 votes; Erna Hennicot-Schoepges (CSV), 19,408 votes; René Konen (DP), 13,825 votes; Émile Krieps (DP), 15,031 votes; Robert Krieps (LSAP), 13,479 votes; Carlo Meintz (DP), 14,504 votes; Lydie Polfer (DP), 26,885 votes; Fernand Rau (CSV), 19,613 votes; Jacques Santer (CSV), 30,499 votes; Josy Simon (5/6), 5,440 votes; Alphonse Theis (CSV), 18,425 votes; and Jup Weber (GLEI), 13,872 votes.

===== 1984 =====
Results of the 1984 general election held on 17 June 1984:

Party		Votes	%	Seats
Christian Social People's Party	CSV	437,313	36.08%	9
Democratic Party	DP	314,742	25.97%	7
Luxembourg Socialist Workers' Party	LSAP	307,584	25.38%	6
Green Alternative Party	GAP	73,088	6.03%	1
Independent Socialist Party	PSI	41,467	3.42%	0
Communist Party of Luxembourg	KPL	35,191	2.90%	0
Revolutionary Communist League	LCR	2,639	0.22%	0
Total		1,212,024	100.00%	23
Valid votes		57,331		
Blank votes		2,216	3.62%	
Rejected votes – other		1,686	2.75%	
Total polled		61,233	87.97%	
Registered electors		69,603		

The following candidates were elected: Hary Ackermann (LSAP), 14,064 votes; Léon Bollendorff (CSV), 21,819 votes; Anne Brasseur (DP), 15,475 votes; Nicolas Estgen (CSV), 19,467 votes; Marc Fischbach (CSV), 23,332 votes; Colette Flesch (DP), 29,247 votes; Robert Goebbels (LSAP), 15,973 votes; Jean Hamilius (DP), 16,442 votes; René Hengel (LSAP), 17,088 votes; Erna Hennicot-Schoepges (CSV), 20,359 votes; René Kollwelter (LSAP), 14,961 votes; René Konen (DP), 18,938 votes; Émile Krieps (DP), 19,768 votes; Robert Krieps (LSAP), 20,854 votes; Astrid Lulling (CSV), 22,675 votes; Carlo Meintz (DP), 16,474 votes; Nicolas Mosar (CSV), 19,298 votes; Ernest Mühlen (CSV), 19,739 votes; Lydie Polfer (DP), 26,368 votes; Fernand Rau (CSV), 21,790 votes; Jacques Santer (CSV), 32,241 votes; Jup Weber (GAP), 4,106 votes; and Jos Wohlfart (LSAP), 15,961 votes.

==== 1970s ====
===== 1979 =====
Results of the 1979 general election held on 10 June 1979:

Party		Votes	%	Seats
Christian Social People's Party	CSV	407,916	37.26%	8
Democratic Party	DP	328,503	30.01%	7
Luxembourg Socialist Workers' Party	LSAP	195,831	17.89%	4
Jean Gremling's Independent Socialist List	SI	66,909	6.11%	1
Social Democratic Party	SDP	45,179	4.13%	0
Communist Party of Luxembourg	KPL	28,766	2.63%	0
Alternative List - Worth it		12,182	1.11%	0
Liberal Party	LP	6,133	0.56%	0
Revolutionary Communist League	LCR	2,517	0.23%	0
Club of Independents		849	0.08%	0
Total		1,094,785	100.00%	20
Valid votes		58,084		
Blank votes		1,664	2.69%	
Rejected votes – other		2,060	3.33%	
Total polled		61,808	87.85%	
Registered electors		70,358		

The following candidates were elected: Léon Bollendorff (CSV), 23,109 votes; Marc Fischbach (CSV), 20,955 votes; Colette Flesch (DP), 28,580 votes; Jean Gremling (SI), 10,621 votes; Jean Hamilius (DP), 19,013 votes; Camille Hellinckx (DP), 17,172 votes; René Hengel (LSAP), 12,878 votes; René Konen (DP), 18,606 votes; Émile Krieps (DP), 20,181 votes; Robert Krieps (LSAP), 13,748 votes; Georges Margue (CSV), 21,347 votes; Carlo Meintz (DP), 16,970 votes; Nicolas Mosar (CSV), 20,995 votes; Ernest Mühlen (CSV), 23,003 votes; Fernand Rau (CSV), 21,133 votes; Jacques Santer (CSV), 26,570 votes; Gaston Thorn (DP), 31,246 votes; René van den Bulcke (LSAP), 11,354 votes; Pierre Werner (CSV), 32,502 votes; and Jos Wohlfart (LSAP), 12,954 votes.

===== 1974 =====
Results of the 1974 general election held on 26 May 1974:

Party		Votes	%	Seats
Democratic Party	DP	370,193	34.46%	7
Christian Social People's Party	CSV	296,450	27.60%	6
Luxembourg Socialist Workers' Party	LSAP	252,208	23.48%	5
Social Democratic Party	SDP	76,551	7.13%	1
Communist Party of Luxembourg	KPL	54,782	5.10%	1
Liberal Party	LP	18,502	1.72%	0
Revolutionary Communist League	LCR	5,518	0.51%	0
Total		1,074,204	100.00%	20
Valid votes		57,564		
Blank votes		1,183	1.95%	
Rejected votes – other		1,860	3.07%	
Total polled		60,607	89.18%	
Registered electors		67,964		

The following candidates were elected: Léon Bollendorff (CSV), 17,619 votes; Albert Bousser (SDP), 6,034 votes; Emile Burggraff (CSV), 18,458 votes; Colette Flesch (DP), 35,707 votes; Pierre Grégoire (CSV), 18,908 votes; Jean Gremling (LSAP), 14,419 votes; Camille Hellinckx (DP), 18,851 votes; René Hengel (LSAP), 16,268 votes; René Konen (DP), 20,726 votes; Émile Krieps (DP), 21,240 votes; Robert Krieps (LSAP), 15,014 votes; Georges Margue (CSV), 16,473 votes; Camille Polfer (DP), 22,689 votes; Jacques Santer (CSV), 20,123 votes; Eugène Schaus (DP), 20,691 votes; Gaston Thorn (DP), 38,218 votes; Dominique Urbany (KPL), 4,672 votes; René van den Bulcke (LSAP), 14,743 votes; Pierre Werner (CSV), 29,918 votes; and Jos Wohlfart (LSAP), 16,271 votes.

==== 1960s ====
===== 1968 =====
Results of the 1968 general election held on 15 December 1968:

Party		Votes	%	Seats
Christian Social People's Party	CSV	326,056	36.53%	7
Luxembourg Socialist Workers' Party	LSAP	252,839	28.33%	5
Democratic Party	DP	224,919	25.20%	5
Communist Party of Luxembourg	KPL	84,056	9.42%	1
National Solidarity		4,718	0.53%	0
Total		892,588	100.00%	18
Valid votes		52,657		
Blank votes		1,739	3.10%	
Rejected votes – other		1,618	2.89%	
Total polled		56,014	88.20%	
Registered electors		63,507		

The following candidates were elected: Tony Biever (CSV), 18,693 votes; Léon Bollendorff (CSV), 19,609 votes; Paul Elvinger (DP), 15,262 votes; Madeleine Frieden-Kinnen (CSV), 22,741 votes; Pierre Grégoire (CSV), 21,886 votes; Jean Hamilius (DP), 12,769 votes; René Hengel (LSAP), 16,048 votes; Georges Margue (CSV), 18,789 votes; Nicolas Mosar (CSV), 18,387 votes; Camille Polfer (DP), 12,719 votes; Eugène Schaus (DP), 17,353 votes; Gaston Thorn (DP), 19,799 votes; Dominique Urbany (KPL), 6,879 votes; René van den Bulcke (LSAP), 15,337 votes; Antoine Wehenkel (LSAP), 15,637 votes; Pierre Werner (CSV), 25,345 votes; Paul Wilwertz (LSAP), 16,109 votes; and Jos Wohlfart (LSAP), 17,919 votes.

===== 1964 =====
Results of the 1964 general election held on 7 June 1964:

Party		Votes	%	Seats
Christian Social People's Party	CSV	306,959	34.12%	7
Luxembourg Socialist Workers' Party	LSAP	303,417	33.72%	6
Democratic Party	DP	148,785	16.54%	3
Communist Party of Luxembourg	KPL	80,569	8.95%	1
Popular Independent Movement	MIP	60,042	6.67%	1
Total		899,772	100.00%	18
Valid votes		52,745		
Blank votes		1,736	3.09%	
Rejected votes – other		1,646	2.93%	
Total polled		56,127	89.72%	
Registered electors		62,558		

The following candidates were elected: Tony Biever (CSV), 18,725 votes; Albert Bousser (LSAP), 18,053 votes; Paul Elvinger (DP), 11,186 votes; Marcel Fischbach (CSV), 18,780 votes; Pierre Grégoire (CSV), 21,557 votes; René Hengel (LSAP), 17,254 votes; Alphonse Hildgen (LSAP), 18,605 votes; Nicolas Kollwelter (CSV), 17,975 votes; Georges Margue (CSV), 18,186 votes; Nicolas Mosar (CSV), 17,343 votes; Jean-Pierre Reisdoerfer (MIP), 3,904 votes; Eugène Schaus (DP), 14,002 votes; Gaston Thorn (DP), 11,301 votes; Dominique Urbany (KPL), 6,643 votes; Adrien van Kauvenbergh (LSAP), 17,958 votes; Antoine Wehenkel (LSAP), 19,473 votes; Pierre Werner (CSV), 23,208 votes; and Jos Wohlfart (LSAP), 21,691 votes.

==== 1950s ====
===== 1959 =====
Results of the 1959 general election held on 1 February 1959:

Party		Votes	%	Seats
Christian Social People's Party	CSV	304,064	37.52%	6
Luxembourg Socialist Workers' Party	LSAP	250,024	30.85%	5
Democratic Party	DP	224,171	27.66%	5
Communist Party of Luxembourg	KPL	32,143	3.97%	0
Total		810,402	100.00%	16
Valid votes		52,773		
Rejected votes		3,006	5.39%	
Total polled		55,779	92.01%	
Registered electors		60,625		

The following candidates were elected: Tony Biever (CSV), 21,991 votes; Victor Bodson (LSAP), 17,322 votes; Albert Bousser (LSAP), 17,517 votes; Paul Elvinger (DP), 15,702 votes; Marcel Fischbach (CSV), 22,222 votes; Pierre Frieden (CSV), 26,878 votes; Pierre Grégoire (CSV), 21,403 votes; Émile Hamilius (DP), 21,669 votes; Lucien Koenig (DP), 17,576 votes; Eugène Schaus (DP), 23,218 votes; Henri Sinner (CSV), 19,245 votes; Antoine Wehenkel (LSAP), 17,707 votes; Pierre Werner (CSV), 23,773 votes; Paul Wilwertz (LSAP), 18,999 votes; Jos Wohlfart (LSAP), 18,019 votes; and Roger Wolter (DP), 14,471 votes.

===== 1954 =====
Results of the 1954 general election held on 30 May 1954:

Party		Votes	%	Seats
Christian Social People's Party	CSV	333,085	42.30%	7
Luxembourg Socialist Workers' Party	LSAP	265,337	33.70%	6
Democratic Group	GD	137,158	17.42%	3
Communist Party of Luxembourg	KPL	27,165	3.45%	0
Independent Party of the Middle Class		24,604	3.12%	0
Total		787,349	100.00%	16
Valid votes		50,914		
Rejected votes		2,761	5.14%	
Total polled		53,675	92.16%	
Registered electors		58,243		

The following candidates were elected: Jean-Pierre Bauer (LSAP), 16,797 votes; Tony Biever (CSV), 22,589 votes; Victor Bodson (LSAP), 20,995 votes; Albert Bousser (LSAP), 17,629 votes; Marcel Fischbach (CSV), 21,624 votes; Pierre Frieden (CSV), 25,757 votes; Pierre Grégoire (CSV), 22,065 votes; Jean Gremling (LSAP), 17,871 votes; Émile Hamilius (GD), 14,958 votes; Lucien Koenig (GD), 12,059 votes; Émile Reuter (CSV), 23,904 votes; Nicolas Rollinger (CSV), 24,925 votes; Eugène Schaus (GD), 12,362 votes; Adrien van Kauvenbergh (LSAP), 17,922 votes; Antoine Wehenkel (LSAP), 18,020 votes; and Pierre Werner (CSV), 27,008 votes.

===== 1951 =====
Results of the 1951 general election held on 3 June 1951:

Party		Votes	%	Seats
Luxembourg Socialist Workers' Party	LSAP	301,640	39.90%	7
Christian Social People's Party	CSV	274,679	36.33%	6
Democratic Group	GD	149,136	19.73%	3
Communist Party of Luxembourg	KPL	30,613	4.05%	0
Total		756,068	100.00%	16
Valid votes		49,089		
Blank votes		1,245	2.40%	
Rejected votes – other		1,439	2.78%	
Total polled		51,773	89.99%	
Registered electors		57,532		

The following candidates were elected: Jean-Pierre Bauer (LSAP), 20,104 votes; Tony Biever (CSV), 18,126 votes; Victor Bodson (LSAP), 22,609 votes; Albert Bousser (LSAP), 21,115 votes; Pierre Frieden (CSV), 21,831 votes; Émile Hamilius (GD), 16,278 votes; Lucien Koenig (GD), 12,398 votes; Maurice Leick (LSAP), 19,055 votes; Fernand Loesch (CSV), 18,227 votes; Émile Reuter (CSV), 22,158 votes; Nicolas Rollinger (CSV), 19,276 votes; Eugène Schaus (GD), 13,517 votes; Adrien van Kauvenbergh (LSAP), 20,983 votes; Antoine Wehenkel (LSAP), 19,846 votes; Camille Welter (CSV), 17,668 votes; and Paul Wilwertz (LSAP), 21,283 votes.

==== 1940s ====
===== 1945 =====
Results of the 1945 general election held on 21 October 1945:

Party		Votes	%	Seats
Christian Social People's Party	CSV	273,754	39.83%	6
Patriotic and Democratic Group	GPD	177,801	25.87%	4
Luxembourg Workers' Party	LAP	177,051	25.76%	4
Communist Party of Luxembourg	KPL	56,710	8.25%	1
Schummer Party		2,015	0.29%	0
Total		687,331	100.00%	15
Valid votes		47,466		
Blank votes		426	0.86%	
Rejected votes – other		1,488	3.01%	
Total polled		49,380		
Registered electors				

The following candidates were elected: Jean-Pierre Bauer (LAP), 12,806 votes; Tony Biever (CSV), 19,433 votes; Victor Bodson (LAP), 15,009 votes; Gaston Diderich (GPD), 16,353 votes; Pierre Frieden (CSV), 23,183 votes; Émile Hamilius (GPD), 18,074 votes; Gustave Jacquemart (GPD), 14,404 votes; Camille Kasel (CSV), 19,228 votes; Jean-Pierre Kohner (LAP), 15,843 votes; Guillaume Konsbruck (CSV), 26,316 votes; Fernand Loesch (CSV), 21,768 votes; François Neu (LAP), 12,805 votes; Eugène Schaus (GPD), 15,010 votes; Lambert Schaus (CSV), 19,627 votes; and Fritz Schneider (KPL), 5.298 votes.

==== 1930s ====
===== 1937 =====
Results of the 1937 general election held on 6 June 1937:

Party		Votes	%	Seats
Party of the Right	RP	223,153	36.57%	6
Luxembourg Workers' Party	LAP	186,056	30.49%	5
Democratic List	DL	102,013	16.72%	2
Radical Liberal Party	RLP	99,029	16.23%	2
Total		610,251	100.00%	15
Valid votes		42,721		
Blank votes		1,464	3.22%	
Rejected votes – other		1,289	2.83%	
Total polled		45,474		
Registered electors				

The following candidates were elected: Jean-Pierre Bauer (LAP), 13,154 votes; Tony Biever (RP), 14,999 votes; Victor Bodson (LAP), 16,473 votes; Marcel Cahen (RLP), 10,295 votes; Gaston Diderich (RLP), 12,608 votes; Émile Hamilius (RP), 16,980 votes; Venant Hildgen (LAP), 12,552 votes; Nicolas Jacoby (RP), 14,790 votes; Jean-Pierre Kohner (LAP), 17,293 votes; Fernand Loesch (RP), 16,444 votes; Leo Müller (DL), 13,048 votes; François Neu (LAP), 14,154 votes; Jean Origer (RP), 18,204 votes; Albert Philippe (RP), 15,913 votes; and Pierre Prüm (DL), 12,620 votes.

===== 1931 =====
Results of the 1931 general election held on 7 June 1931:

Party		Votes	%	Seats
Party of the Right	RP	185,144	38.21%	6
Luxembourg Workers' Party	LAP	115,882	23.92%	3
Radical Socialist Party	RSP	78,464	16.20%	2
Radical Party	RP	58,160	12.00%	2
Independent Party	OP	40,569	8.37%	1
Communist Party of Luxembourg	KPL	6,264	1.29%	0
Total		484,483	100.00%	14
Valid votes		36,751		
Blank votes		1,079	2.76%	
Rejected votes – other		1,324	3.38%	
Total polled		39,154		
Registered electors				

The following candidates were elected: François Altwies (Right), 14,591 votes; René Blum (LAP), 13,793 votes; Marcel Cahen (Radical), 9,566 votes; Gaston Diderich (RSP), 11,696 votes; Nicolas Jacoby (Right), 14,973 votes; Jean-Pierre Kohner (OP), 8,790 votes; Norbert Le Gallais (RSP), 7,974 votes; Nicolaus Mackel (Right), 14,149 votes; Dominique Moes (LAP), 8,824 votes; François Neu (LAP), 10,154 votes; Jean Origer (Right), 16,879 votes; Tony Pemmers (Radical), 8,324 votes; Albert Philippe (Right), 16,110 votes; and Auguste Thorn (Right), 14,546 votes.

==== 1920s ====
===== 1925 =====
Results of the 1925 general election held on 1 March 1925:

Party		Votes	%	Seats
Party of the Right	RP	153,969	36.12%	5
Union of the Left	VL	133,747	31.38%	5
Luxembourg Workers' Party	LAP	53,437	12.54%	1
National Independent Union	ONV	45,560	10.69%	1
Left Liberals	LL	39,500	9.27%	1
Total		426,213	100.00%	13
Valid votes		33,977		
Blank votes		649	1.82%	
Rejected votes – other		1,121	3.14%	
Total polled		35,747		
Registered electors				

The following candidates were elected: François Altwies (RP), 15,445 votes; Robert Brasseur (LL), 6,833 votes; Marcel Cahen (VL), 16,674 votes; Gaston Diderich (VL), 17,097 votes; Jean-Pierre Ecker (RP), 12,508 votes; Jacques Gallé (VL), 12,140 votes; Jean Hansen (LAP), 5,620 votes; Jean-Pierre Kohner (ONV), 7,764 votes; Nicolas Ludovicy (VL), 12,509 votes; Jean Origer (RP), 12,687 votes; Albert Philippe (RP), 14,043 votes; Marguerite Thomas-Clement (VL), 10,569 votes; and Auguste Thorn (RP), 13,056 votes.

===== 1922 =====
Results of the 1922 general election held on 28 May 1922:

Party		Votes	%	Seats
Party of the Right	RP	166,084	43.15%	6
Liberal–Democratic List	LDL	162,790	42.29%	6
Socialist Party	SP	49,084	12.75%	1
Communist Party of Luxembourg	KPL	6,976	1.81%	0
Total		384,934	100.00%	13
Valid votes		29,960		
Rejected votes		1,595	5.05%	
Total polled		31,555		
Registered electors				

The following candidates were elected: François Altwies (RP), 15,040 votes; Robert Brasseur (LDL), 15,806 votes; Marcel Cahen (LDL), 15,363 votes; Gaston Diderich (LDL), 17,036 votes; Jean-Pierre Ecker (RP), 12,888 votes; Alphonse Eichhorn (RP), 13,001 votes; Jacques Gallé (LDL), 13,405 votes; Nicolas Jacoby (RP), 13,563 votes; Jean-Pierre Kohner (RP), 14,227 votes; Norbert Le Gallais (LDL), 14,348 votes; Nicolas Ludovicy (LDL), 13,918 votes; Émile Mark (SP), 5,953 votes; and Albert Philippe (RP), 15,156 votes.

==== 1910s ====
===== 1919 =====
Results of the 1919 general election held on 26 October 1919:

Party		Votes	%	Seats
Party of the Right	RP	180,545	45.27%	6
Radical List	RL	121,598	30.49%	4
Socialist Party	SP	83,151	20.85%	3
Independent People's Party	FV	13,490	3.38%	0
Total		398,784	100.00%	13
Valid votes				
Blank votes				
Rejected votes – other				
Total polled				
Registered electors				

The following candidates were elected: François Altwies (RP), 17,376 votes; Robert Brasseur (RL), 10,325 votes; Raymond de Waha (RP), 15,211 votes; Gaston Diderich (RL), 10,615 votes; Alphonse Eichhorn (RP), 13,885 votes; Venant Hildgen (SP), 6,846 votes; Nicolas Jacoby (RP), 13,981 votes; Jean-Pierre Kohner (RP), 13,885 votes; Norbert Le Gallais (RL), 10,220 votes; Nicolas Ludovicy (RL), 12,328 votes; Albert Philippe (RP), 16,038 votes; Michel Schettlé (SP), 8,501 votes; and Marguerite Thomas-Clement (SP), 7,589 votes.
