= Patrick Goldschmidt =

Luxembourgish politician (born 1970)

The Honourable Patrick Goldschmidt
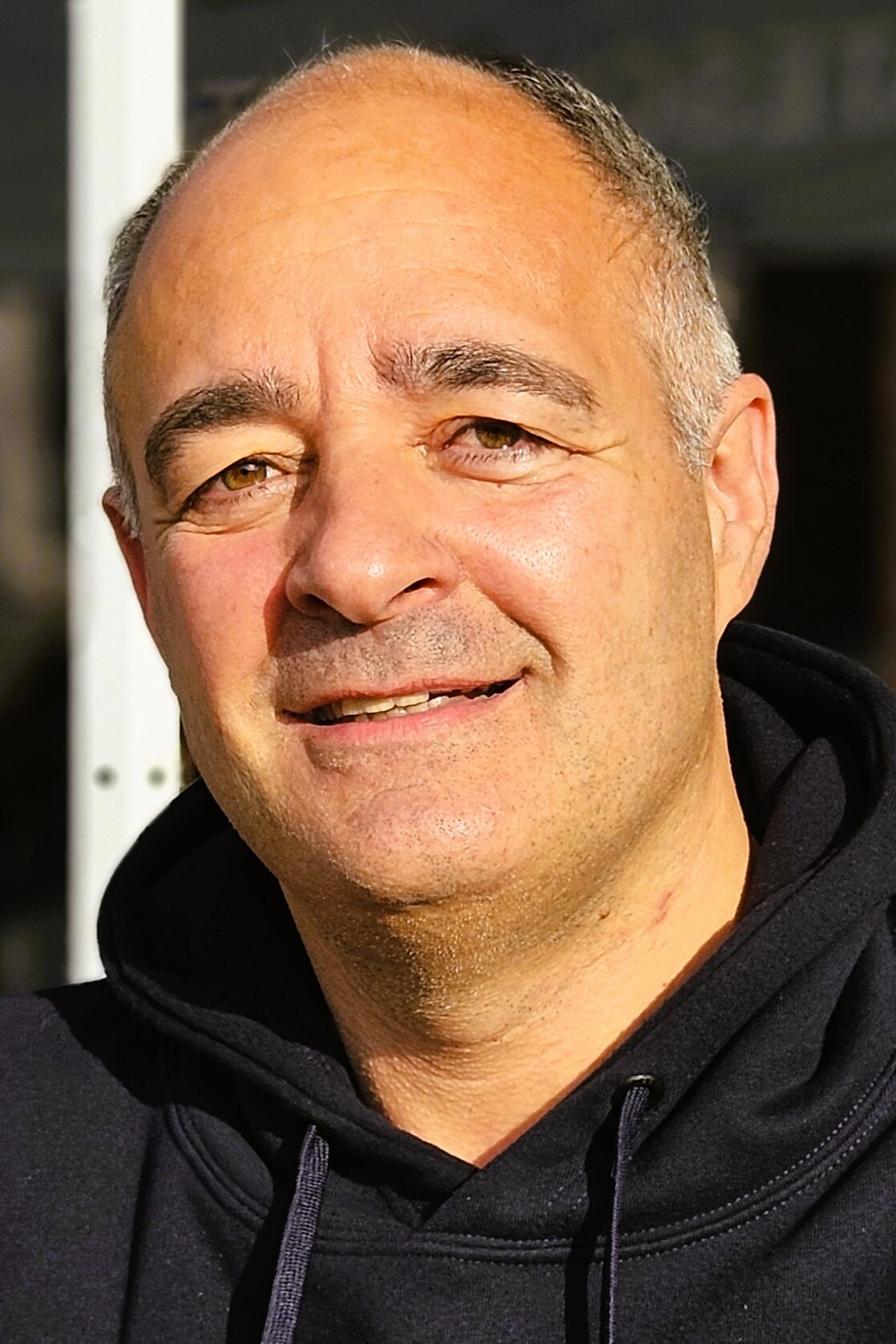

Member of the Chamber of Deputies
- Incumbent
- Assumed office 21 November 2023
- Constituency: Centre

Alderman of Luxembourg City
- Incumbent
- Assumed office 12 December 2013
- Mayor: Lydie Polfer

Personal details
- Born: 2 February 1970 (age 56)
- Party: Democratic Party (since 1999)
- Relatives: Corinne Cahen (second cousin)

Patrick Goldschmidt (born 2 February 1970) is a Luxembourgish politician of the Democratic Party. He has served as a member of the Chamber of Deputies from Centre since 2023.

Goldschmidt worked for KPMG from 1993 to 2005, before founding his own fiduciary company, Goldschmidt & Associates. He became a member of the Luxembourg City Communal Council in 2009 and has served as alderman in charge of mobility since 2013. Alongside mayor Lydie Polfer, Goldschmidt was the DP's co-lead candidate in the 2023 communal election in Luxembourg City, leading him to be described as Polfer's "officially designated successor".

Through his mother, he is a second cousin of fellow Luxembourg City alderwoman and deputy Corinne Cahen.
