= Diane Adehm =

Luxembourgish politician

The Honourable Diane Adehm
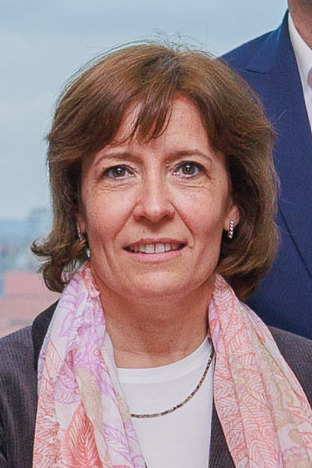

Mayor of Hesperange
- Incumbent
- Assumed office 24 July 2025
- Preceded by: Marc Lies

Member of the Chamber of Deputies of Luxembourg
- Incumbent
- Assumed office 8 March 2011
- Preceded by: Jean-Louis Schiltz
- Constituency: Centre

Personal details
- Born: 13 September 1970 (age 56) Ettelbruck, Luxembourg
- Party: Christian Social People's Party

Diane Adehm (born 13 September 1970) is a Luxembourgish politician of the Christian Social People's Party (CSV). She has been a deputy since 2011.

== Biography ==
Adehm attended the Lycée classique de Diekirch. From 1989 to 1994, she studied economic and social science at the Our Lady of Peace University Faculties in Namur, Belgium where she obtained a master's degree. In 2006, she obtained a Master of Business Administration degree at the Sacred Heart University in Connecticut.

Adehm joined the Christian Social People's Party in 2003.

She was an auditor at the Court of Auditors.

In 2005, Adehm was elected to the Hesperange communal council, and later became an alderwoman of the commune. In 2009, she stood for the general election but was not directly elected. On 8 March 2011 she replaced Jean-Louis Schiltz as a deputy of the Centre constituency. She was re-elected in 2013, 2018 and 2023.

On 18 June 2014 Adehm voted in favour of the legalisation of same-sex marriage with 21 other deputies of the CSV party.
