= Jean-Pierre Klein =

Jean-Pierre Klein (born 24 January 1944 in Heisdorf) is a Luxembourgish politician for the Luxembourg Socialist Workers' Party (LSAP) and jurist. He served as a member of the Chamber of Deputies for the Centre constituency from 1994 to 2013, and as mayor of Steinsel from 1987 to 2021. Upon his retirement from the latter, he was the longest serving mayor in Luxembourg.

Klein was not elected at the 2004 election, falling just short (in 5th place on the LSAP list, which won 4 seats in Centre). However, Robert Goebbels, who had placed third, resigned his office before the new Chamber was sworn in, allowing the next-placed Klein to take his place.
