= Paul-Henri Meyers =

Luxembourgish politician

Member of the Chamber of Deputies
- In office 12 August 1999 – 30 October 2018

First Alderman of Luxembourg City
- In office 1 January 1997 – 10 November 2005
- Mayor: Lydie Polfer; Paul Helminger
- Preceded by: Willy Bourg
- Succeeded by: François Bausch

Personal details
- Born: 1 January 1937 (age 89) Binsfeld
- Party: Christian Social People's Party (CSV)

Paul-Henri Meyers (born 1 January 1937) is a Luxembourgish politician and jurist. He sits in the Chamber of Deputies, having previously been a Councillor of State. He has been a member of the Christian Social People's Party (CSV) since 1966.

He first entered Luxembourg City's communal council on 14 June 1982. In 1985, he was appointed to the Council of State, taking the place of Lucien Kraus on 28 November. He was reelected to the communal council in 1987, in 1993, and in 1999 (coming second only to Jacques Santer). Meyers sought election to the Chamber of Deputies in the 1994 election, but missed out. Nonetheless, after the election, in August, Meyers was appointed as one of two Vice-Presidents of the Council of State (alongside Raymond Kirsch). On 1 January 1997, he was appointed as échevin of Luxembourg City in a DP-CSV coalition; he remained in that capacity until the 2005 communal election, which he declined to contest.

Meyers ran for Chamber of Deputies again in 1999 election to the Chamber, finishing eighth amongst the CSV candidates, with six elected. However, the appointment of Luc Frieden and Erna Hennicot-Schoepges to the new government required them to resign their seats, allowing Meyers to sit in the Chamber instead. To allow him to take his seat, he was required to resign from the Council of State, which he did on 11 August 1999. He was re-elected directly in the 2004 election, coming fifth out of CSV candidates, of whom, eight were elected in a comfortable victory for the party.
