= Paul Galles =

Luxembourgish politician (born 1973)

The Honourable Paul Galles
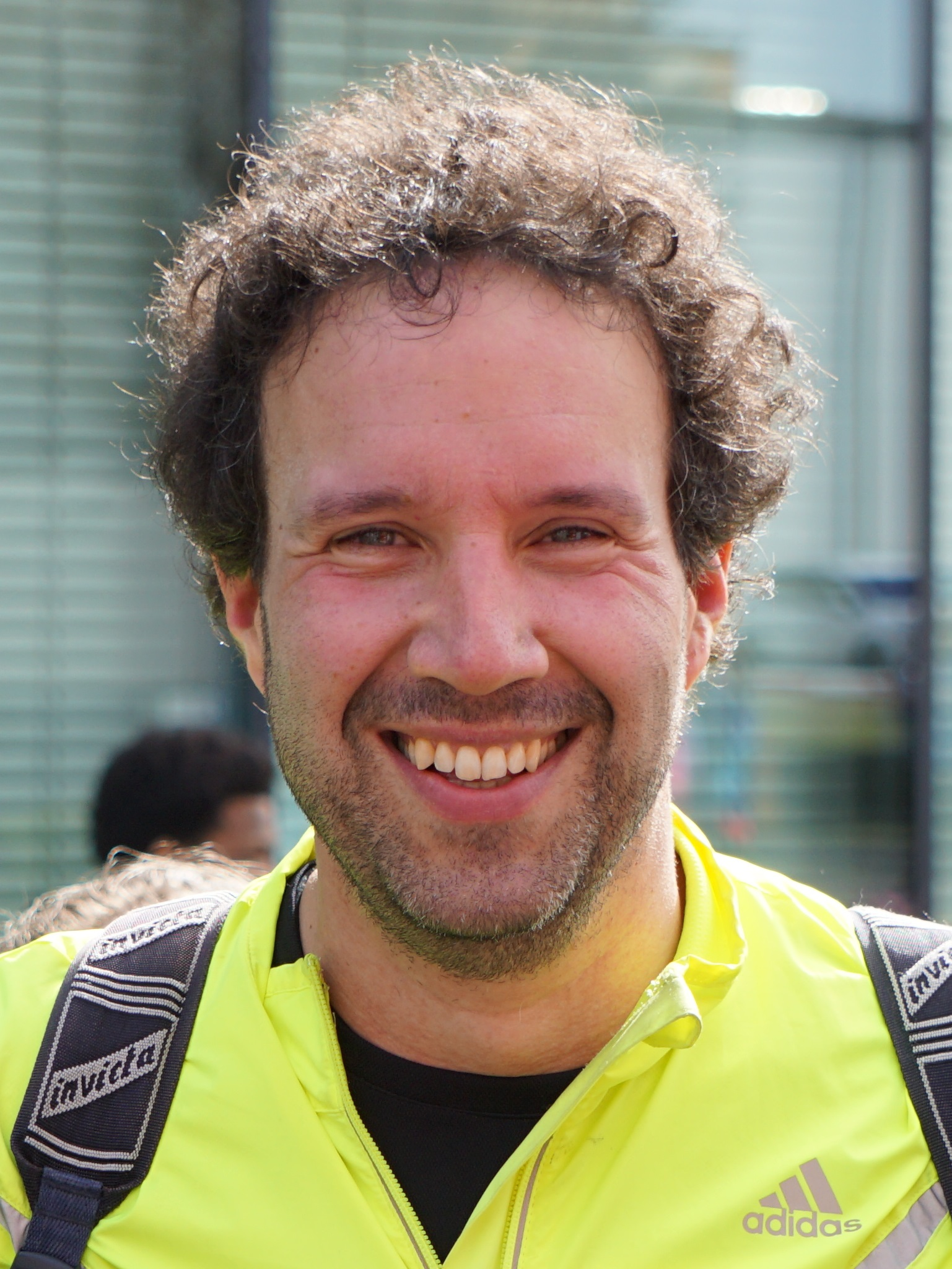

Member of the Chamber of Deputies
- Incumbent
- Assumed office 30 October 2018
- Constituency: Centre

Personal details
- Born: 18 May 1973 (age 52) Luxembourg City, Luxembourg
- Party: Christian Social People's Party

Paul Galles (born 18 May 1973) is a Luxembourgish politician and theologian. He has served as a member of the Chamber of Deputies for Centre since 2018. He is a member of the Christian Social People's Party.

Before entering politics, he was a Catholic priest, choosing to renounce priesthood in 2010 in order to pursue a romantic relationship.
