= Laurent Mosar =

Luxembourgish politician and lawyer

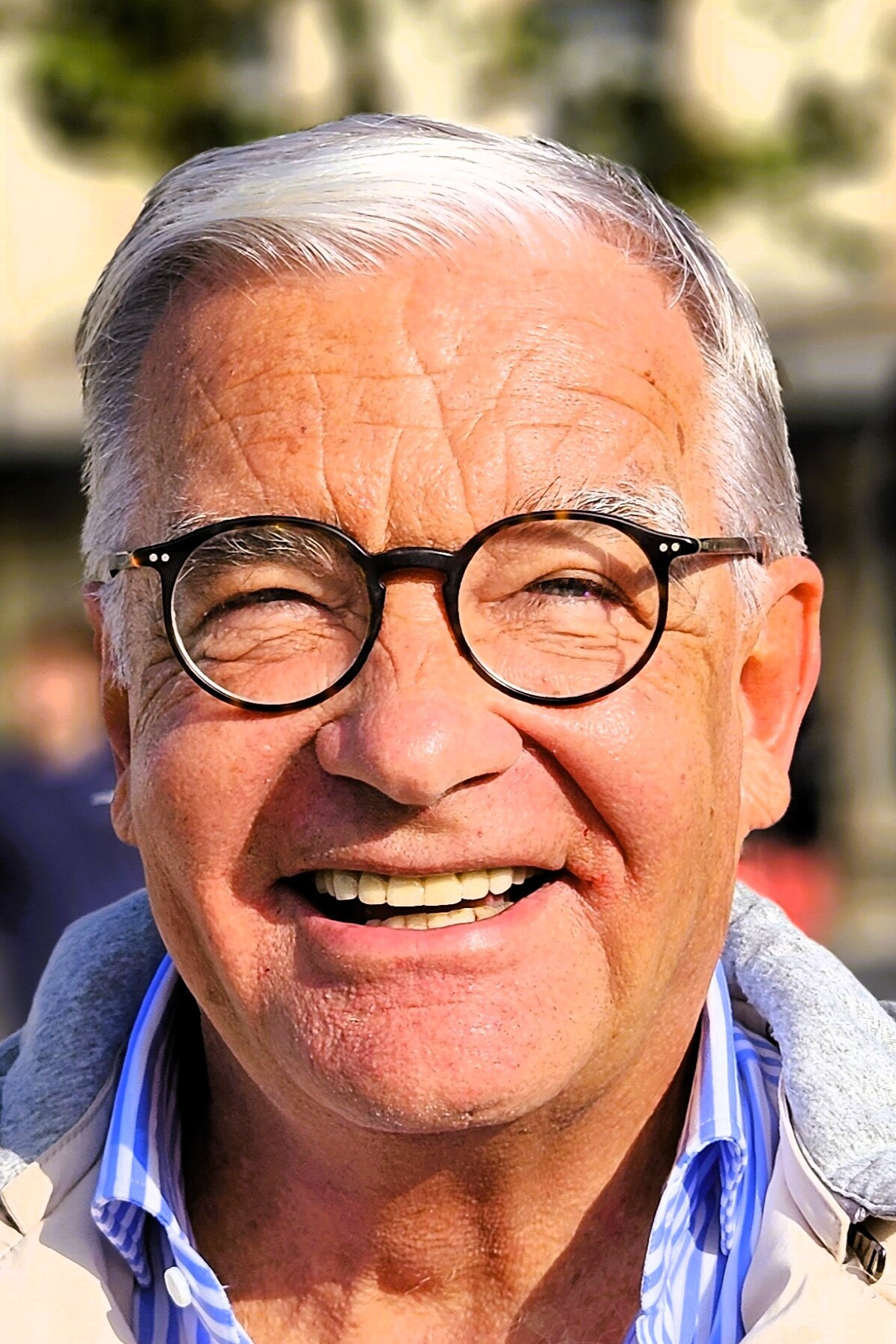
Laurent Mosar in 2023.

Laurent Mosar (born 8 February 1958 in Luxembourg City) is a Luxembourgish politician and lawyer. He is a member of the Christian Social People's Party (CSV) and sits in the Chamber of Deputies. He was the President of the Chamber from 2009 to 2013.

Mosar joined the CSV since 1979; at the time, his father, Nicolas, was a CSV deputy, and soon-to-be European Commissioner. Laurent was elected to the Chamber of Deputies in 1994, representing the Centre constituency. He entered the communal council of Luxembourg City on 27 November 1997, and has remained there since, including his time as an échevin from 2000 until 2005, when the DP-CSV coalition broke down after the 2005 elections.

In the 1999 election to the Chamber, Mosar finished seventh out of CSV candidates, with only six elected. However, the appointment of Luc Frieden and Erna Hennicot-Schoepges to the new government (thus vacating their seats) allowed Mosar to remain in the Chamber. He was re-elected considerably more easily in 2004, coming third out of CSV candidates (and fourth overall), of whom, eight were elected in a comfortably victory for the party. From 3 August 2004 until 7 June 2009, Mosar was a Vice-President of the Chamber of Deputies. After the 2009 election, Mosar was elevated to President of the Chamber, replacing Lucien Weiler.

== See also ==
- List of presidents of the Chamber of Deputies of Luxembourg

== Footnotes ==
Political offices
Preceded by Lucien Weiler	President of the Chamber of Deputies; 2009 – 2013	Succeeded by Mars Di Bartolomeo
