= Simone Beissel =

Luxembourgish politician (born 1953)

The Honourable Simone Beissel
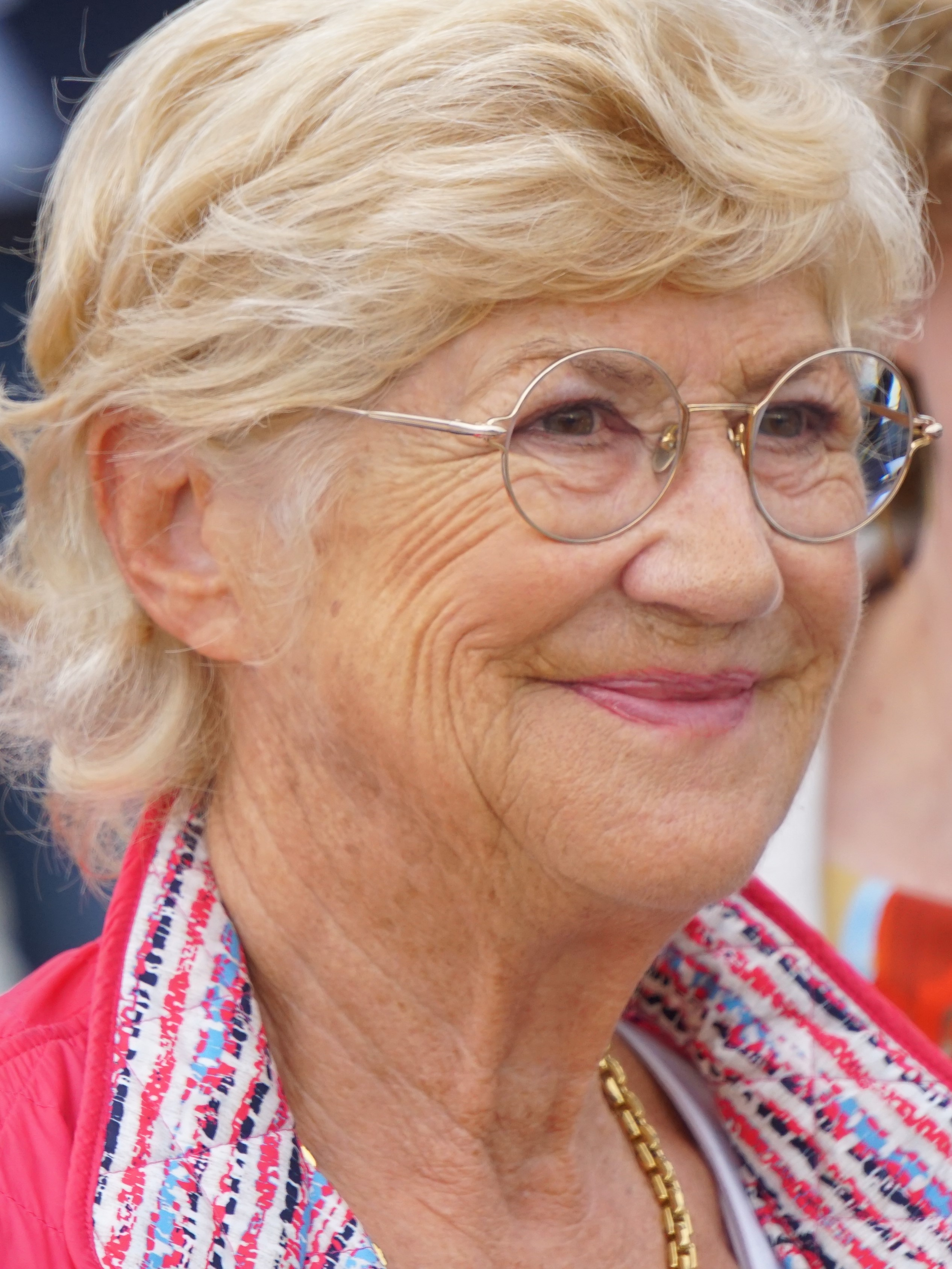
- Beissel in 2022

Member of the Chamber of Deputies
- Incumbent
- Assumed office 13 November 2013
- Constituency: Centre
- In office 12 August 1999 – 5 June 2004
- Constituency: Centre

Personal details
- Born: 27 April 1953 (age 73) Luxembourg City, Luxembourg
- Party: Democratic

Simone Beissel (born 27 April 1953) is a Luxembourgish politician. She has served as a member of the Chamber of Deputies from Centre since 2013. She is a member of the Democratic Party.
