= Alex Krieps =

Alexandre Krieps (born 25 June 1946 in Guildford, England) is a Luxembourgish politician for the Democratic Party (DP). He is a member of the Chamber of Deputies, representing the Centre constituency, where the DP is strongest. He was first elected in 1999, but lost his seat in the 2004 election, in which the DP fared poorly. He returned to the Chamber on 10 October 2006, replacing Niki Bettendorf upon Bettendorf's resignation.

Krieps was born in Guildford, Surrey, when his father, fellow politician and resistance leader Émile Krieps, was posted in the United Kingdom in the aftermath the Second World War.

He is currently President of the Luxembourg Rugby Federation, a position that he had previously held from 1985 to 1992. He is a general practitioner by trade.
