= Marie-Thérèse Gantenbein-Koullen =

Luxembourgish politician (1938–2023)

Marie-Thérèse Gantenbein-Koullen (28 August 1938 – 7 September 2023) was a Luxembourgish politician for the Christian Social People's Party.

== Biography ==
Marie-Thérèse Gantenbein-Koullen was born in Tétange on 28 August 1938.

Gantenbein-Koullen was a member of the Chamber of Deputies, representing the constituency of Centre from 2004 until 2009, when she retired, to be replaced by Fabienne Gaul. In addition to sitting in the Chamber, she was a member of Hesperange's communal council for twenty-one years (1988–2009), including almost three as échevin (1997–1999), and, finally, over nine as mayor of Hesperange (1999–2009).

Gantenbein-Koullen died on 7 September 2023, at the age of 85.
