= Martine Deprez =

Luxembourgish politician

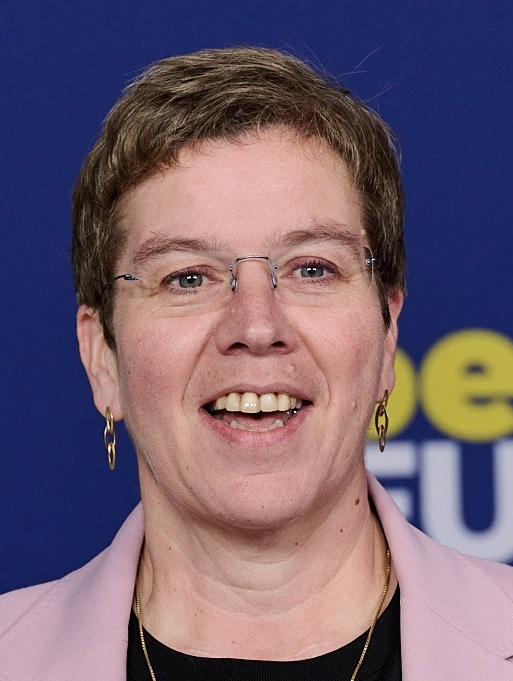
- Deprez in 2024

Minister of Health and Social Security
- Incumbent
- Assumed office 17 November 2023
- Prime Minister: Luc Frieden
- Preceded by: Paulette Lenert (Health); Claude Haagen (Social Security)

Member of the Council of State
- In office 31 October 2012 – 17 November 2023
- Preceded by: Georges Schroeder
- Succeeded by: Alex Penning

Personal details
- Born: 26 April 1969 (age 57) Wiltz, Luxembourg
- Party: Christian Social People's Party (1986–present)
- Education: Cours universitaires du Luxembourg; University of Liège

Martine Deprez (born 26 April 1969) is a Luxembourgish politician who serves as Minister of Health and Social Security in the Frieden-Bettel government since 17 November 2023. She is a member of the CSV.

== Early life ==
Deprez completed her high school studies in 1988. Afterwards, she studied mathematics at the Cours universitaires du Luxembourg and later at the University of Liège, graduating in 1992. Her first job was at the General Inspectorate of Social Security, where she worked as researcher on the Luxembourgish pension system. In 2004, she changed jobs after having completed a training as secondary school teacher and worked as mathematics teacher at Lycée Aline Mayrisch. In 2011, she started teaching at Lycée Hubert Clément. She held this position until her appointment as Minister in November 2023.

== Political career ==
Deprez became a member of the Christian Social People's Party in 1986. From 1992 on, she was active in her local section in Dudelange and the youth wing of the party, CSJ. She was also a member of the national committee of the CSG, the organization of local politicians in the CSV, in 2000.

In 2006, she became a member of the executive committee of the southern district. She also worked in party structures on a national level, becoming deputy secretary general in 2008, working as a contact person for new members. Deprez he was a candidate for the general election in 2009, but did not get elected to the Chamber of Deputies. On 14 November 2009, she was elected as delegate from her district to the national executive board.

=== Council of State ===
As the term of Council of State president Georges Schroeder came to an end on 12 June 2012, a new member was needed and Deprez was proposed. On 31 October 2012, she was officially nominated and was sworn in on 4 November. She worked in the commission for education, research and higher studies as well as the commission for social security and work, using her experience in the Luxembourgish social security system. As membership in the Council of State is incompatible with being a minister, she resigned on 17 November 2023. Her replacement was Alex Penning.

=== Minister of Health and Social Security ===
As she was a member of the Council of State, Deprez did not run in the 2023 general election. Her nomination as member of the government was a surprise, as she was perceived as a political newcomer. During coalition talks, newly elected DP deputy and virologist Gérard Schockmel had proposed himself for Minister of Health, which added further surprise to Deprez's nomination. She was sworn in together with every other member of the government on 17 November 2023. When asked about her political priorities, she stated that she wanted to implement the coalition agreement, which she had been involved in negotiating.

In a November 2023 interview with Radio 100,7, Deprez gave a first insight into her views on the overhaul of the Luxembourgish pension system. She stated needs for consultations with the civil society if prognoses showed that the pension system would turn out to be in an imbalance in a few years. She stated she was against a higher cap on deposits, as this would mean the payoffs would need to grow in the same manner. After a meeting with the respective parliamentary commission, she was criticized, having stated wanting to cut pensions and incentivizing occupational and private pension insurances. In interviews, Deprez emphasised that she only wanted to "strengthen" the so-called second and third pillars of the pension system without reducing the compulsory state pension. Trade union leaders condemned these announcements, criticizing Deprez for talking with the press about her plans before bringing them up with the social partners and for wanting to "privatize" the pension system. A new report on the status of the pension system was announced for June 2024, with formal discussions about reforms beginning in autumn.

In January 2024, it was reported that, from 2022 to 2023, the sales of cigarettes in Luxembourg had gone up by 400 million. Deprez stated that this was only alarming if it correlated with a rise of the smoking rate among Luxembourgish residents - but that a large number of these cigarettes were bought by people not living in the country, due to lower prices compared to neighbouring countries. Although she was aware of the risks of nicotine pouches and emphasised that they could tempt young people to start smoking, she was not in favour of a ban, arguing that due to the small size of the country and the open borders, young people would then travel to neighbouring countries to buy nicotine pouches.

On 18 April 2024, after their petition had reached the 5,000 signatures required for a public hearing in the Chamber of Deputies, a group of activists demanded a ban on so-called "virginity certificates". Deprez emphasised that such a ban was part of the coalition agreement, although no timeline for the introduction of a corresponding law had been worked out yet. She stated that a possible ban on hymen reconstruction should be part of the discussions.

== Voluntary activities ==
Between 2008 and 2012, Deprez was Secretary General of the Union Grand-Duc Adolphe (UGDA), an umbrella organization for music interests in Luxembourg. After an internal dispute over the management styles, Deprez became interim president of the UGDA after an extraordinary congress on 29 October 2015. This position was confirmed on 28 February 2016. Deprez vowed to renew the statues of the UGDA and to intensify the relations with member associations. In July 2016, she was confronted with accusations from the Fédération générale de la fonction communale, the municipal employees' union about poor working conditions and insecure employment relationships for music school teachers with temporary employment contracts, for which the UGDA was responsible. Deprez denied these accusations. She resigned in January 2019, citing time constraints.

== Personal life ==
Deprez is married and has three children.
