= Claire Delcourt =

Luxembourgish politician (born 1989)

The Honourable Claire Delcourt
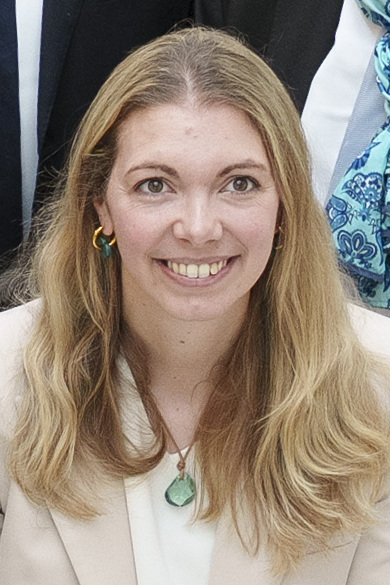
- Delcourt in 2026

Member of the Chamber of Deputies
- Incumbent
- Assumed office 24 October 2023
- Constituency: Centre

Personal details
- Born: 23 January 1989 (age 37)
- Party: Luxembourg Socialist Workers' Party

Claire Delcourt (born 23 January 1989) is a Luxembourgish biologist and politician of the Luxembourg Socialist Workers' Party who was elected member of the Chamber of Deputies in 2023. She was elected councillor of Contern in 2023, but was ineligible for the position due to her employment by the Grand Ducal Police.
