= Francine Closener =

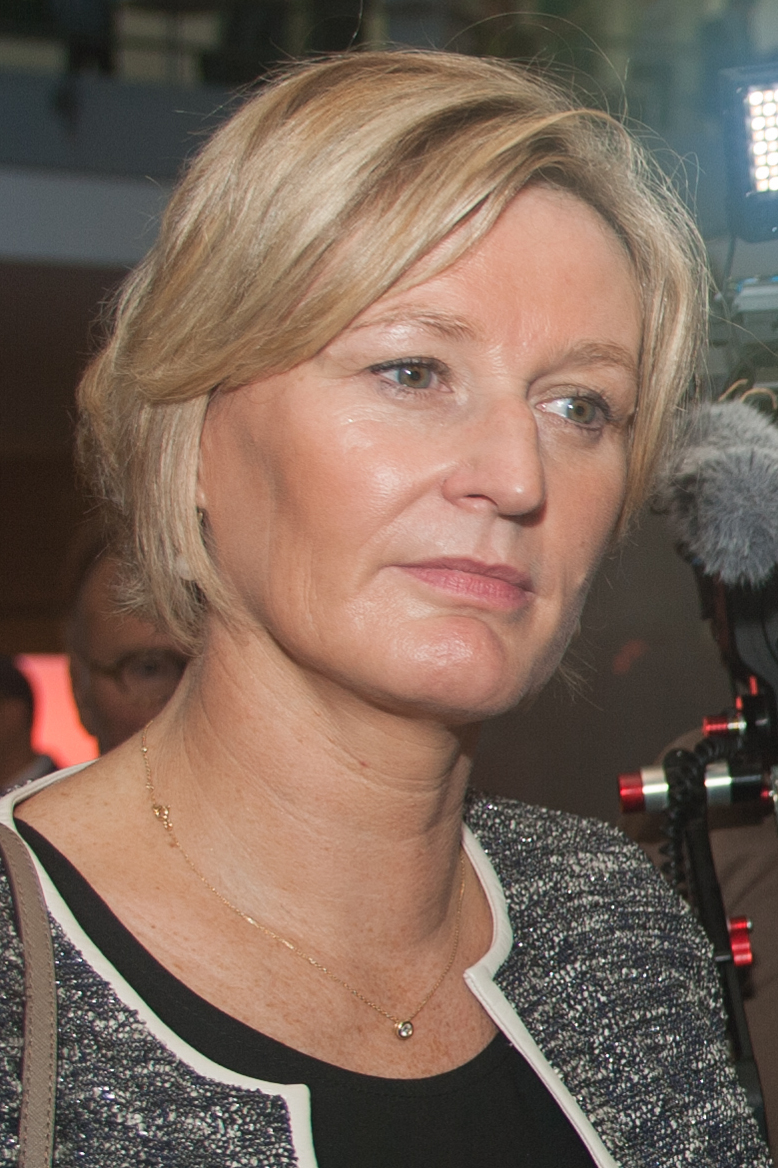
- in 2015
- Born: 29 December 1969 (age 56); Steinfort
- Education: Lycée Michel Rodange, Université libre de Bruxelles
- Occupations: journalist and politician
- Political party: Luxembourg Socialist Workers' Party
- Partner: Jay Schiltz

Francine Closener (born 29 December 1969) is a Luxembourgish journalist who became a politician and the State Secretary at the Ministry of Economy.

== Life ==
Closener was born in 1969 in Steinfort and she went to school at Lycée Michel Rodange. She studied at Université libre de Bruxelles and graduated in journalism and communication in 1993. She went to work at RTL Radio Lëtzebuerg and by 2008 she was the Chief Editor. Two years later she left to work on the news for Luxembourg's main broadcaster RTL Télé Lëtzebuerg.

In 2013 she became the State Secretary at the Ministry of Economy as part of the ruling coalition. On 5 December 2018 she resigned as the Secretary of State.

In 2018 she was elected to the Luxembourg Parliament.

In 2022 she became the co-president of the Luxembourg Socialist Workers' Party with Dan Biancalana. At the 2023 election her party failed to join the government. They had gained an extra seat but this was not enough. The party became the opposition party. She was re-elected to represent the Centre constituency.

In 2025 she was the president of the Benelux Parliamentary Assembly. In March she spoke out about the need for a European common defence policy noting that the creation of a European Army had not been seen as urgent, However America's change in foreign policy necessitated action.

== Private life ==
She is the parent of two children.
