= Renée Wagener =

Luxembourgish politician and journalist

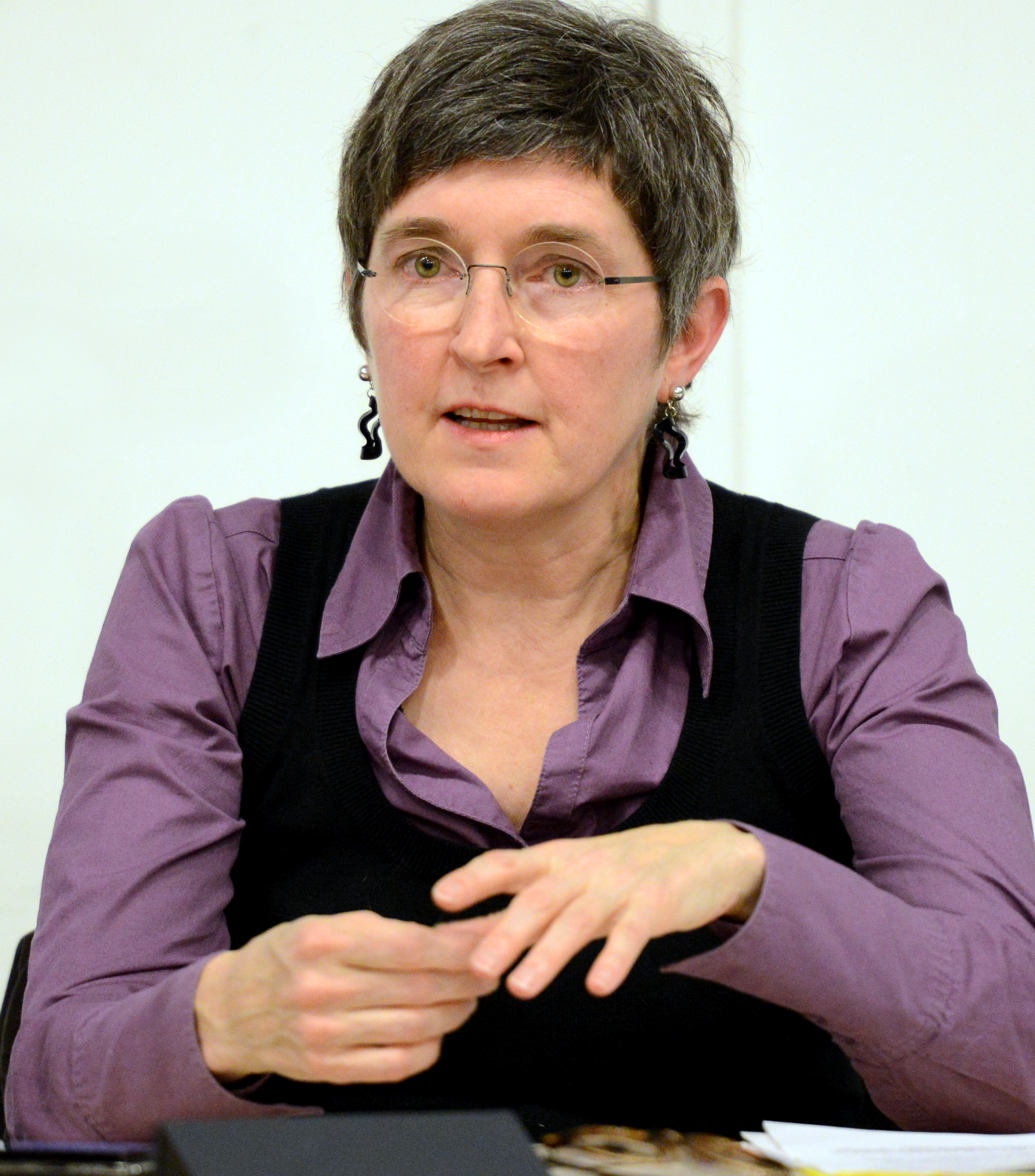
- Renée Wagener in December 2014.

Member of the Chamber of Deputies
- In office 18 July 1994 – 6 June 2004
- Parliamentary group: GLEI-GAP (1994-1995) Gréng (1995-2004)
- Constituency: Centre

Personal details
- Born: 1962 (age 63–64) Luxembourg City
- Party: The Greens
- Education: University of Hagen
- Occupation: Journalist, sociologist, historian

Renée Wagener (born 1962) is a Luxembourgish journalist, sociologist, historian, and former politician. She served for 10 years in the Chamber of Deputies as a member of The Greens.

== Early life and education ==
Renée Wagener was born in 1962 in Luxembourg City, the capital of Luxembourg.

Beginning in 1997, she pursued an advanced degree in sociology, taking correspondence courses at the University of Hagen in Germany. She wrote her master's thesis on "The History of Women's Right to Vote in Luxembourg" and her doctoral thesis on "The Jewish Community in Luxembourg, Between Recognition and Exclusion."

== Career ==
=== Journalism and academia ===
Wagener works as a journalist for the weekly newspaper Woxx, as well as for various media outlets as a freelance writer and announcer. She has also worked on historical research at the University of Luxembourg.

She writes primarily on feminist topics, as well as sociology and history. In 1997, she co-edited the history of women's rights in Luxembourg "Wenn nun wir Frauen auch das Wort ergreifen…": Frauen in Luxemburg 1880-1950. She published a biography of the politician Lydie Schmit, "Méi Sozialismus!" Lydie Schmit und die LSAP 1970-1988, in 2013. In 2019, to mark 100 years of women's suffrage in Luxembourg, she co-curated an exhibit at the National Museum of History and Art about the history of voting rights in the country.

In November 2019, after a meeting of the Council of Government of Luxembourg, she was appointed to the board of directors of the public radio station radio 100,7.

=== Politics ===
Wagener was a founding member of the Green Alternative Party, a precursor to the environmentalist party The Greens, in 1983. She served on the Luxembourg communal council from 1991 to 1994.

In the 1994 Luxembourg general election, she was elected to the country's Chamber of Deputies, where she represented the Centre constituency as a member of The Greens. In May 1996, she introduced one of the country's earliest bills to legalize same-sex marriage, nearly two decades before the Chamber would go on to pass such a measure. She was reelected to the Chamber of Deputies in the 1999 Luxembourg general election, but declined to run again in 2004, stepping down after the election that year.
