= Claude Adam =

Luxembourgish politician

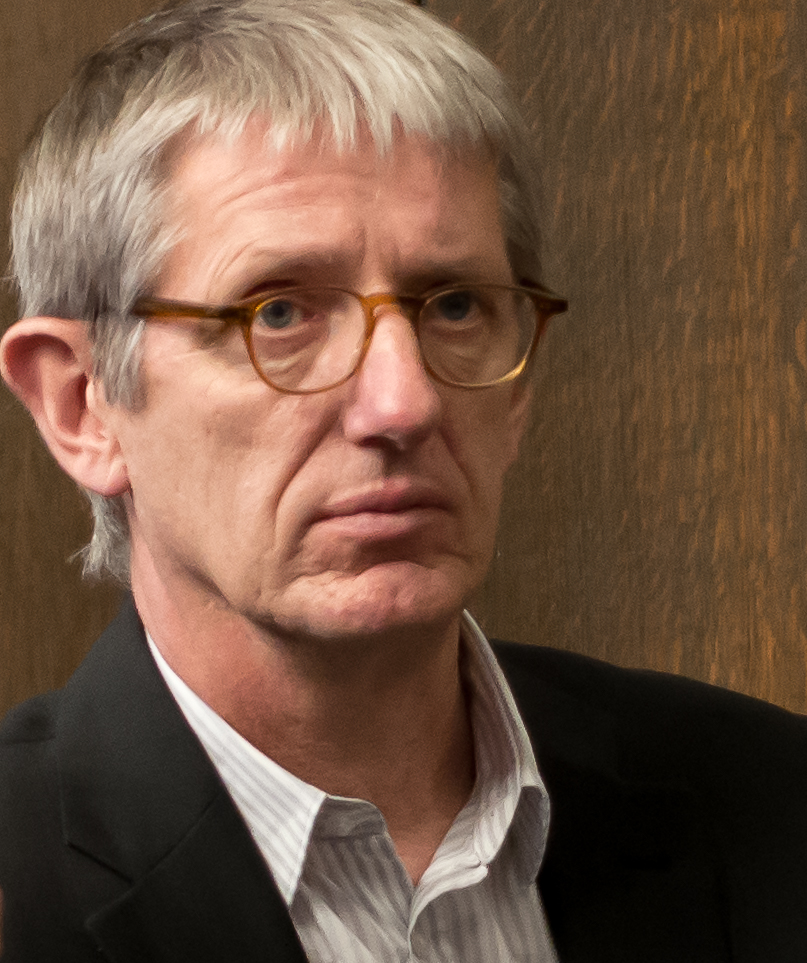
- Adam in 2016

Member of the Chamber of Deputies
- In office 3 August 2004 – 16 April 2018
- Succeeded by: Sam Tanson
- Constituency: Centre

Personal details
- Born: 21 August 1958 (age 67) Ettelbruck, Luxembourg
- Party: Déi Gréng

Claude Adam (born 21 August 1958) is a Luxembourgish politician from The Greens. He was a member of the Chamber of Deputies from 2004 until his resignation in 2018. Adam has also been a member of the municipal council in Mersch since 1999.
