= Willy Bourg =

Luxembourgish politician (1934–2003)

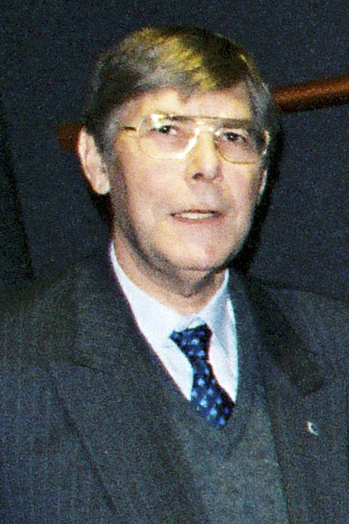
Bourg in 1999

Guillaume 'Willy' Bourg (22 February 1934 – 21 February 2003; Luxembourgish pronunciation: ['buəʒ]) was a Luxembourgish politician. He was a member of the Christian Social People's Party (CSV), and sat in the Chamber of Deputies for eighteen years.

Growing up in Beggen, Bourg studied at the Athénée de Luxembourg, before completing his military service in Arlon, and then Brussels. Upon returning to the country, he remained in the army, serving as an officer training instructor. He retired from the military in 1967. After graduating from the University of Karlsruhe, he became a teacher at the Lycée Technique des Arts et Métiers, in Luxembourg City. He made his first political step in 1979, being elected to the city's communal council. In 1984, Willy became General Secretary of the CSV, succeeding Jean-Pierre Kraemer.

He first entered the Chamber of Deputies on 23 January 1985, taking the place of Nicolas Mosar after Mosar had been appointed Luxembourg's European Commissioner and had thus vacated his seat as deputy for Centre. He was elected in his own right in the 1989 election, and was re-elected subsequently in 1994 and 1999. In 1998, Bourg was appointed Vice-President of the Chamber.

Bourg died on 21 February 2003, the day before his sixty-ninth birthday. He was succeeded in the Chamber of Deputies by Marcel Sauber, then President of the Council of State.

== Footnotes ==
Party political offices
Preceded by Jean-Pierre Kraemer	General Secretary of the CSV; 1984–1990	Succeeded by Camille Dimmer
