= List of mayors of Bertrange =

Bertrange is a commune and town in Luxembourg. This is a list of its mayors.

== List ==
Name	Start	End
Jean-François-Joseph d'Huart (first time)	1805	1808
Jean-Pierre Suttor	1809	1816
Jean-François-Joseph d'Huart (second time)	1817	1824
Jean-François Molitor	1825	1830
Jean-François-Joseph d'Huart (third time)	1831	1837
Jean Beissel	1838	1843
Richard Wolter	1844	1848
Pierre Hutmacher	1849	1854
Nicolas Goergen	1855	1860
Jean-Pierre Muller (first time)	1861	1868
Théophile Fries	1869	1875
Jean-Pierre Muller (second time)	1875	1878
Hubert Hilger (first time)	1879	1884
Alexandre de Colnet	1885	1896
Hubert Hilger (second time)	1897	1908
Jean Kaufmann	1909	1918
Jean Theisen	1918	1925
Antoine Schneider	1925	1935
Nicolas Hilger	1935	1957
André Wolff	1958	1972
Joseph Marson	1972	1981
Niki Bettendorf	1982	2001
Paul Geimer	2002	2009
Frank Colabianchi	2009	2022
Monique Smit-Thijs	2022	2025
Youri De Smet	2025	present
