= Viviane Loschetter =

Luxembourgish politician (born 1961)

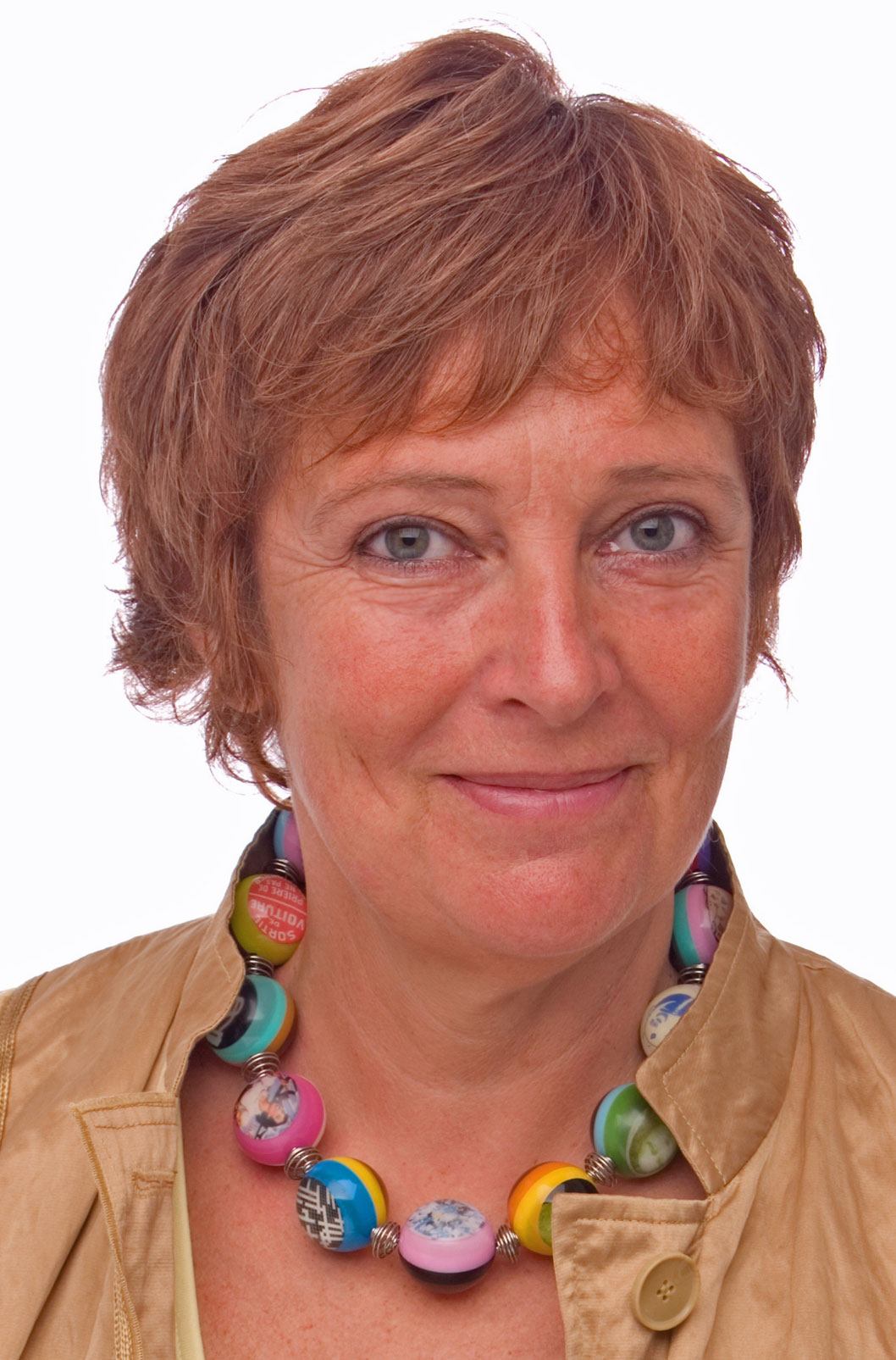

Member of the Chamber of Deputies for the Centre constituency
- In office 13 July 2004 – 14 October 2018

Personal details
- Born: 10 April 1959 (age 67)
- Party: Déi Gréng

Viviane Loschetter (born 10 April 1959) is a Luxembourgish politician, educator and former member of the Chamber of Deputies for The Greens from 2004 to 2018. She led the Greens' parliamentary group from 2013 to 2018.

== Early life and education ==
Loschetter was born on 10 April 1959 to a Luxembourgish father and an Italian mother. Her parents had met at university in Lausanne, Switzerland. Her family spoke French and she did not learn Luxembourgish until kindergarten. She also learnt German when she was aged seven and learned Italian from visiting her mother's family in Italy for two months a year when she was a child.

She has a degree in social pedagogy.

== Political career ==
Loschetter joined the Greens in 1998 and became a communal councillor in the City of Luxembourg in 2000. Between 2005 and 2013, she was a member of the coalition administration in the city (with the Democratic Party), with responsibility for the environment and social affairs.

She was elected to the Chamber of Deputies, being sworn in on 13 July 2004. She became the parliamentary leader of the Green group in 2013, succeeding François Bausch after he became Minister of Sustainable Development and Infrastructure in the Bettel government.

In 2017, she announced she would not run in the municipal elections. In 2018, she said that she would also not run in that year's general election, quitting electoral politics entirely to focus on her work resettling and integrating refugee children.
