= Sven Clement =

Luxembourgish politician (born 1989)

The Honourable Sven Clement
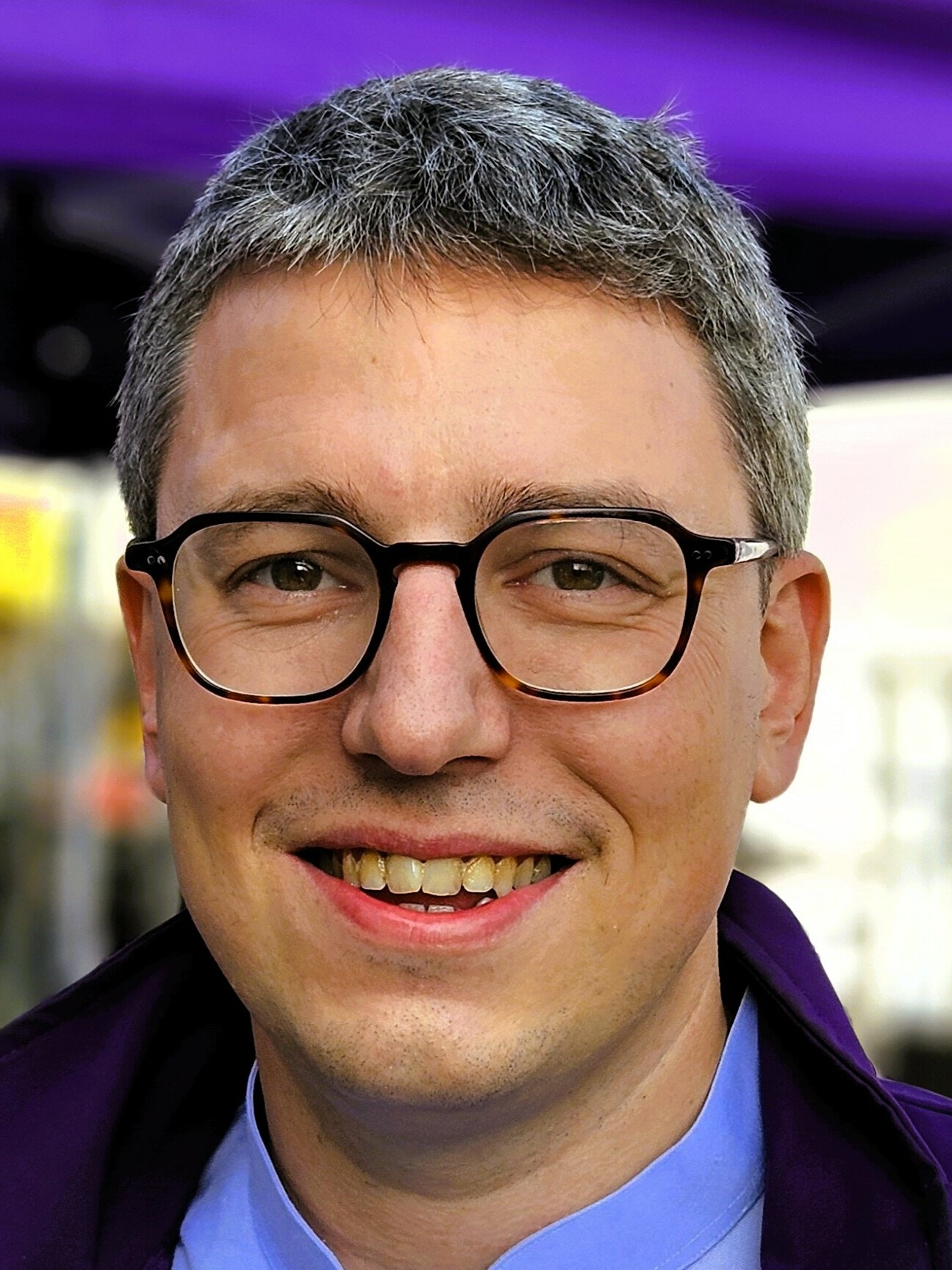
- Clement in 2023

Member of the Chamber of Deputies
- Incumbent
- Assumed office 30 October 2018
- Constituency: Centre

Personal details
- Born: 19 January 1989 (age 37)
- Party: Pirate Party Luxembourg
- Occupation: Politician, entrepreneur

Sven Clement (born 19 January 1989) is a Luxembourgish politician and MP of the Pirate Party Luxembourg of which he is also one of the founders.

He studied business informatics at Saarbrücken University and has served as a Member of the Chamber of Deputies for the Pirate Party since October 2018.

Clement runs together with his party colleague, Jerry Weyer, a consulting company for digital communication, Clement & Weyer Consulting sàrl, which is also involved in other companies.

== Political career ==
Sven Clement was already involved in the LSAP during his studies. However, he left the party after the parliamentary elections in 2009 and began searching on Google to find another political party to join. In 2010 he was elected together with 3 other candidates from the Pirate Party and the student parliament (AStA) of the Saarland University and was responsible for the University of the "Grande Région" (UGR), for public transport and for international cooperation. Sven Clement was President of the AStA in Saarbrücken from July 2012 to July 2014.

In 2009 he was a founding member and the first president of the Pirate Party of Luxembourg. Most recently, he was confirmed at the National Congress on 10 December 2017. In the parliamentary elections on 14 October 2018, he was the lead candidate for the Pirate Party in the center constituency and was elected to the Chamber of Deputies as one of the party's two MPs. Today he is honorary chairman of the party.

=== Medicoleak affair ===
After a complaint by the then Justice Minister François Biltgen about data theft, a search was carried out at Sven Clement’s in April 2012 as part of the so-called Medicoleak affair case, in which two Macbooks, two iPhones and an iPad were confiscated. On 16 October 2014, he was sentenced to a fine of 500 euros for theft of internal data and hacking.

=== "Arrêt Clement" ===
When it became known at the end of 2019 that the RTL group would relocate part of its activities from Luxembourg to Germany, Clement, as MP, asked the Prime Minister and Minister for Media, Xavier Bettel, to be permitted to read the agreement between RTL and the Luxembourgish government. On 12 November 2019, the Prime Minister stated that he could not grant access to the contract due to a confidentiality clause, which Clement then went on to contest in court. In the first instance, the administrative court declared that it had no jurisdiction and the case was referred to the higher administrative court. It was decided on 26 January 2021 (No. 44997C), that as part of their role to scrutinise the government, MPs must have the right to read all contracts between the state and third parties. This ruling caused a great stir in the media and in parliament.

== Personal life ==
Sven Clement is married and has a daughter.
