= Gérard Schockmel =

Luxembourgish politician (born 1961)

The Honourable Gérard Schockmel
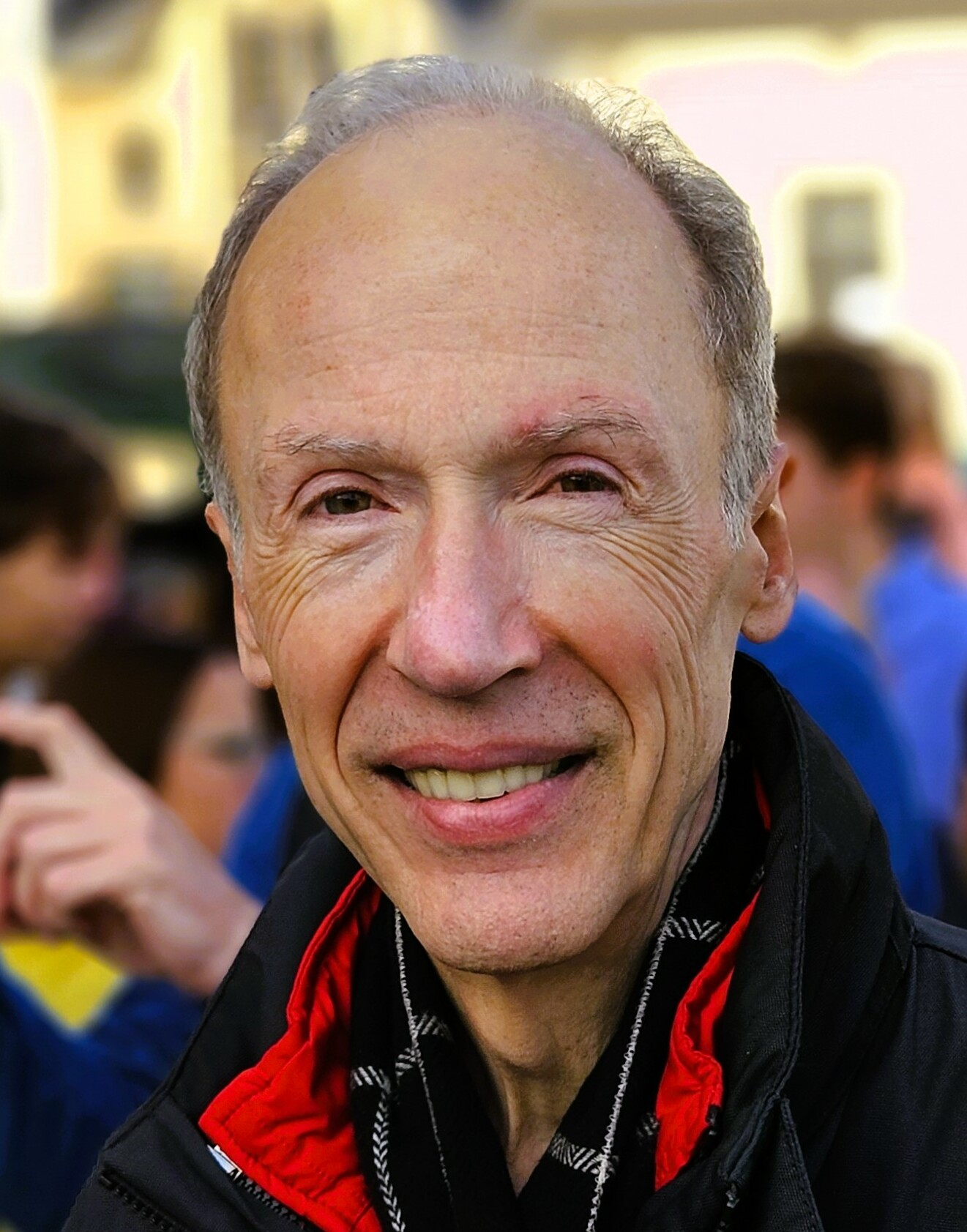
- Schockmel in 2023

Member of the Chamber of Deputies
- Incumbent
- Assumed office 24 October 2023
- Constituency: Centre

Personal details
- Born: 9 March 1961 (age 65) Esch-sur-Alzette, Luxembourg
- Party: Democratic
- Education: University of Oxford (PhD)

Gérard Schockmel (born 9 March 1961) is a Luxembourgish virologist and politician. A member of the Democratic Party, he has served in the Chamber of Deputies since October 2023, representing the Centre constituency.

== Biography ==
=== Education and professional career ===
Schockmel was born on 9 March 1961 in Esch-sur-Alzette. After studying in Belgium, Austria and Germany, he worked in HIV research at the University of Oxford, obtaining a PhD in 1992. Schockmel then worked for the pharmaceutical industry in Basel and for the Robert Schuman Hospital in Kirchberg.

He gained national prominence during the COVID-19 pandemic as one of the foremost infectious disease specialists in Luxembourg, giving frequent interviews to radio and television in which he explained aspects of the pandemic, particularly of COVID vaccines. This led him to be described as a popular and trusted figure in Luxembourg.

=== Political career ===
Schockmel joined the Democratic Party (DP) in July 2023 and was a candidate in the general election in October of that year. He came fifth on the DP's list in the Centre constituency, receiving 15,000 votes and being directly elected to the Chamber of Deputies and sworn in on 24 October. He resigned from his position at Robert Schuman Hospital but kept an office there.

As a deputy, Schockmel has served on a number of parliamentary commissions, most notably as Vice President of the Health and Social Security Commission. Early in his tenure, he criticized the DP for not appointing him as Minister for Health in the new CSV-DP coalition government - with the position instead going to the CSV's Martine Deprez, a civil servant and former mathematics teacher - questioning whether the appointment was "democratically legitimate". His comments were described by the Luxembourg Times as "a striking break with Luxembourg's tradition of consensus-driven politics".

Schockmel has also been critical of the Bettel government's response to the COVID-19 pandemic, describing some of its aspects as "scandalous". He has highlighted what he perceives as a lack in communication surrounding the importance of Covid vaccines, with a number of Luxembourgish residents relying on social media for information and being exposed to conspiracy theories, and criticised the government's large-scale testing approach as "blind", "throwing money down the drain" and negligent of vulnerable populations, with former Health Minister Paulette Lenert rejecting the last claim.

=== Controversies ===
In October 2025, following the Chamber's Institutional Affairs Committee's near-unanimous approval of a proposal to enshrine abortion rights in the Constitution of Luxembourg, Schockmel published an opinion piece in Luxemburger Wort in which he voiced his opposition to the decision and described modern feminism as a "ruthless ideology" driven by "deep hatred and intolerance", denouncing "systematic discrimination against men". His comments were condemned by a number of politicians, including from his own party, with DP President Carole Hartmann stating that the article did not reflect the party's position, and DP Equality and Diversity Minister Yuriko Backes saying she was "saddened" by its publication.

On 3 March 2026, when a large majority of the Chamber voted in favour of enshrining abortion freedom in the Constitution, Schockmel was the only deputy aside from the ADR group to vote against.
