= Guy Arendt =

Luxembourgish politician (born 1954)

The Honourable Guy Arendt
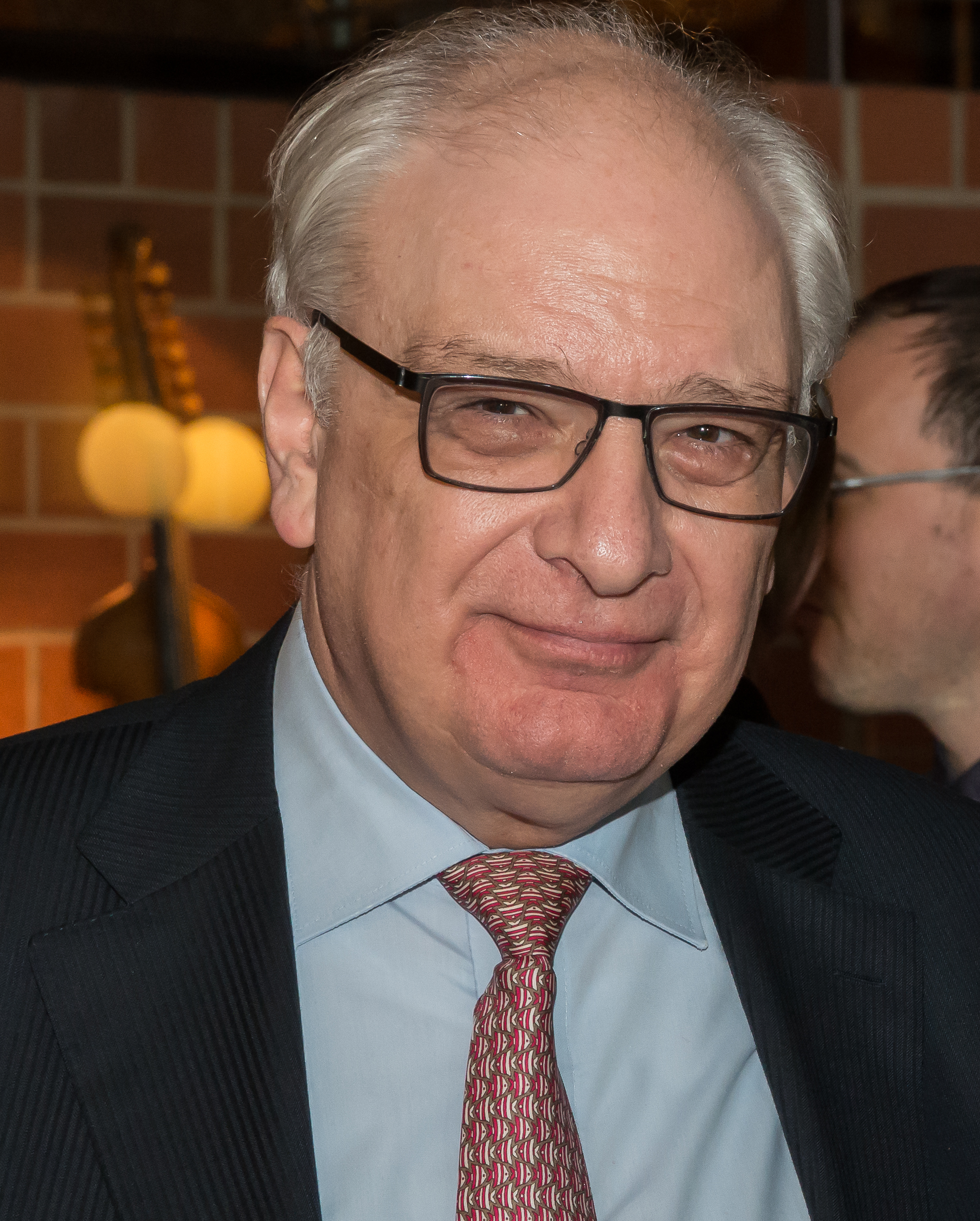
- Arendt in 2016

Member of the Chamber of Deputies
- Incumbent
- Assumed office 21 November 2023
- Constituency: Centre

Personal details
- Born: 13 April 1954 (age 71) Luxembourg City, Luxembourg
- Party: Democratic Party

Guy Arendt (born 13 April 1954) is a Luxembourgish politician. Since 2023, he has served as a member of the Chamber of Deputies from Centre.
