= Niki Bettendorf =

Luxembourgish politician (1936-2018)

Mayor of Bertrange
- In office 1982–2001
- Preceded by: Joseph Marson
- Succeeded by: Paul Geimer

Member of the Chamber of Deputies
- In office 19 June 1990 – 10 October 2006

Vice President of the Chamber of Deputies
- In office 1999–2006

Head of Luxembourg's delegation to the NATO Parliamentary Assembly

Personal details
- Born: Nicolas Jean-Pierre Bettendorf; 20 December 1936 Belvaux, Luxembourg
- Died: 27 January 2018 (aged 81)
- Party: Democratic Party (DP)

Nicolas Jean-Pierre Bettendorf (20 December 1936 – 27 January 2018) was a Luxembourgish politician.

He served as Mayor of Bertrange from 1982 until 2001.

He was a member of the Chamber of Deputies for sixteen years, from 19 June 1990 until he resigned on 10 October 2006, when he resigned in favour of Alex Krieps. During his tenure in the Chamber of Deputies, Bettendorf was one of the Chamber's three vice presidents (1999–2006), and also led Luxembourg's delegation to the NATO Parliamentary Assembly.

== Footnotes ==
Political offices
Preceded by Joseph Marson	Mayor of Bertrange; 1982–2001	Succeeded by Paul Geimer
