= Paul Elvinger =

Luxembourgish lawyer and politician (1907-1982)

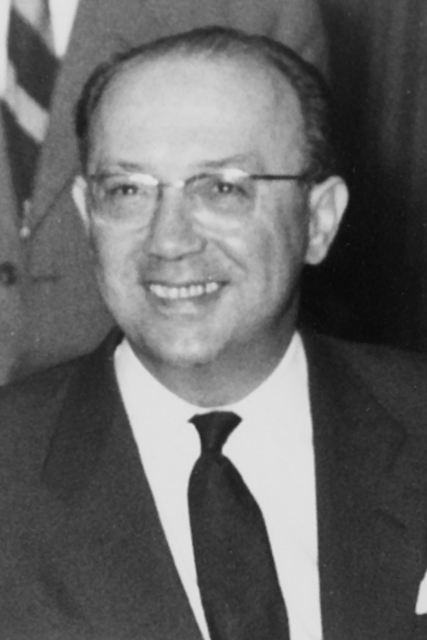
- Elvinger in 1959
- Born: 14 October 1907; Walferdange, Luxembourg
- Died: 1 December 1982 (aged 75); Luxembourg City, Luxembourg
- Occupations: Politician, lawyer, economist
- Political party: Democratic Party

Paul Elvinger (14 October 1907 – 1 December 1982) was a Luxembourgish lawyer and politician. He was a member of the Luxembourgish Democratic Party.
