= Social Democratic Party (Luxembourg) =

Defunct political party in Luxembourg

Social Democratic Party Parti Social Démocrate
- President: Henry Cravatte
- Founded: March 1971
- Dissolved: 1984
- Ideology: Social democracy
- Political position: Centre

The Social Democratic Party (Luxembourgish: Sozialdemokratesch Partei, French: Parti Social Démocrate, German: Sozialdemokratische Partei), abbreviated to PSD, was a social democratic political party in Luxembourg, active between 1971 and 1984.

The PSD was founded in March 1971 as a secession of the right wing of the Luxembourg Socialist Workers' Party (LSAP) which had a centrist orientation. The group left the LSAP in opposition to the rising leftist faction in the LSAP, which opposed forming coalitions with the Christian Social People's Party (CSV) and championed coalitions with the Communist Party at communal level.

The split was led by Henry Cravatte, who had been ejected as President of the LSAP in May 1970. In total, six of the LSAP's eighteen MPs joined the new party, including Albert Bousser and Astrid Lulling. One-sixth of the LSAP's communal councillors also defected.

The party competed in the 1974 election, taking 9.2% of the vote and winning five seats, to draw level with the Communist Party, which had been the long-held fourth party in Luxembourgish politics. In that election, the LSAP formed a coalition with the Democratic Party. In 1979, the PSD lost three of their seats to a resurgent CSV. In the European election held on the same day, the PSD failed to win a seat, but did beat the Communist Party into fifth place.

Before it fought another election, the party disbanded, in 1984. Some of its members, including Cravatte, returned to the LSAP, whilst others, such as Lulling, continued moving politically from left to right by joining the CSV,
