= Ben Fayot =

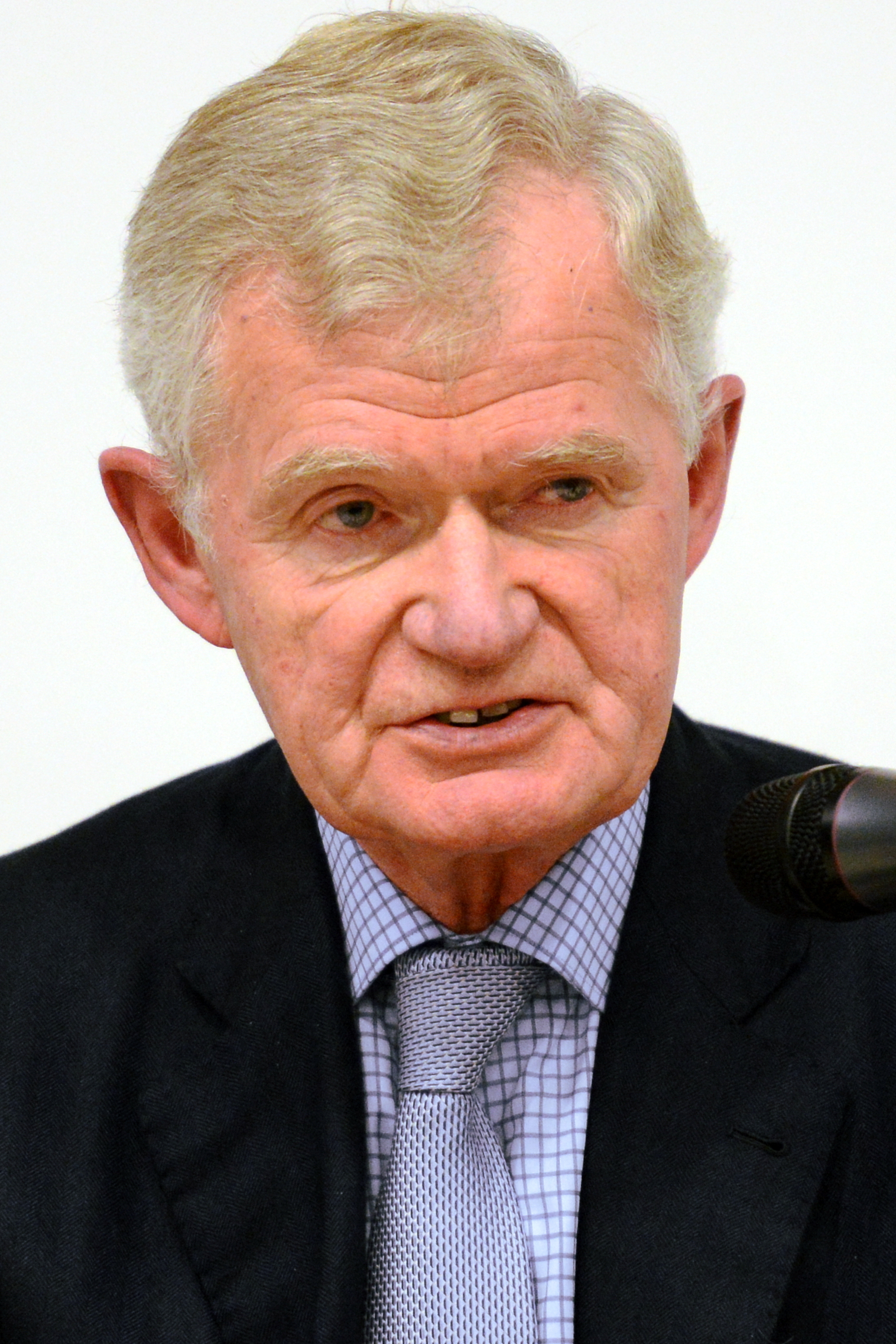
Ben Fayot in 2014

Bernard Willibrord Venand "Ben" Fayot (born 25 June 1937 in Luxembourg City) is a Luxembourgish politician from the Luxembourg Socialist Workers' Party (LSAP). Fayot sat in the Chamber of Deputies for five years from 1984. He was a Member of the European Parliament from 1989 until 1999, when he returned to the Chamber of Deputies. Since 2004, he has been the president of the LSAP's deputation in the Chamber of Deputies.

By profession, Fayot was a political historian, specialising in the history of socialism in Luxembourg. He is also a contributor to the daily Tageblatt newspaper on the topics related to socialism.

He is the father of fellow LSAP politician Franz Fayot, who served as Minister of the Economy from 2020 to 2023.

Party political offices
Preceded by Robert Krieps	President of the LSAP; 1985–1997	Succeeded by Jean Asselborn
