= Tony Biever =

Luxembourgian politician (1908–1990)

Tony Biever (1908–1990) was a Luxembourgish politician for the Christian Social People's Party (CSV) and jurist. He was President of the CSV from 1964 to 1965 and President of the CSV's delegation in the Chamber of Deputies from 1959 to 1974.

As a lawyer, he is notable for having given Jacques Santer, who went on to become Prime Minister of Luxembourg and President of the European Commission, his first job. He had been, from 1940 to 1941, President of the Luxembourg Conference of Young Barristers (French: Conférence du Jeune Barreau de Luxembourg).

== Footnotes ==
Party political offices
| Preceded by Émile Reuter | President of the CSV; 1964 – 1965 | Succeeded by Jean Dupong |
