= Marc Lies =

Luxembourgish politician (born 1968)

The Honourable Marc Lies
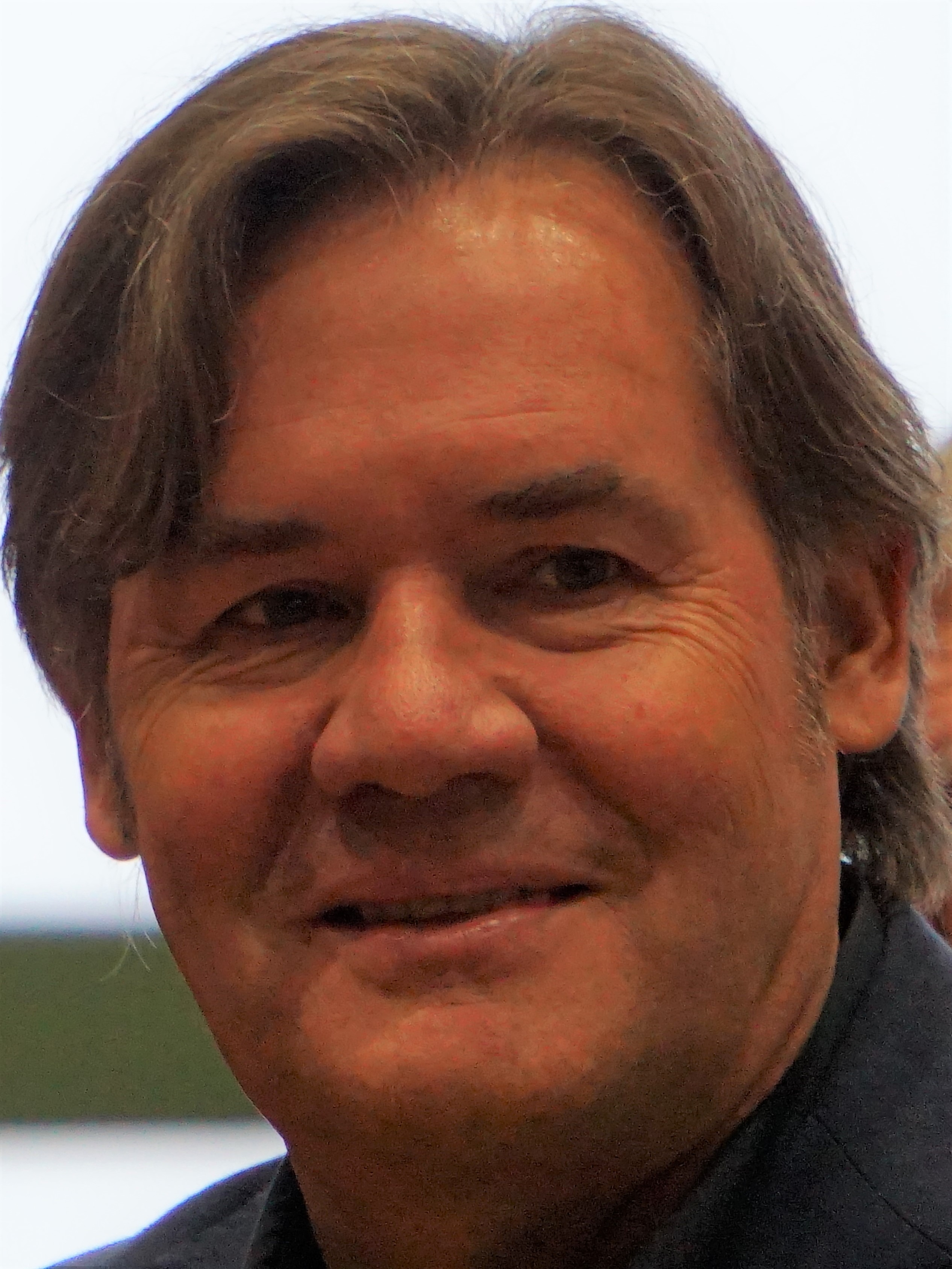

Member of the Chamber of Deputies
- Incumbent
- Assumed office 28 July 2009
- Constituency: Centre

Personal details
- Born: 30 December 1968 (age 57) Echternach, Luxembourg
- Party: Christian Social People's Party

Marc Lies (born 30 December 1968) is a Luxembourgish politician. He has served as a member of the Chamber of Deputies for the Centre and as mayor of Hesperange since 2009. He is a member of the Christian Social People's Party.
