= Antoine Wehenkel =

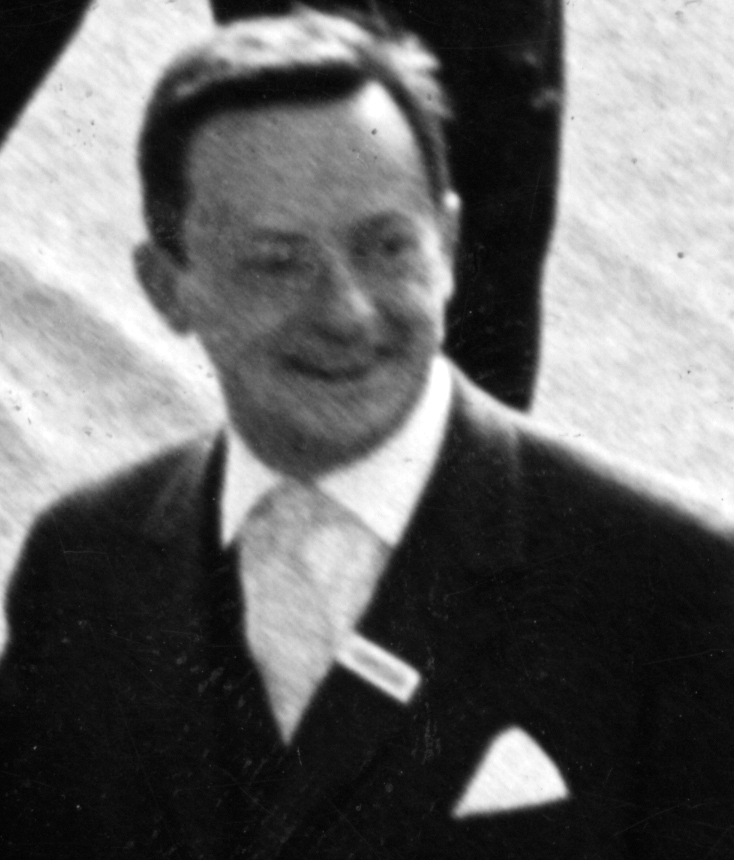
Antoine Wehenkel, Einweihung des Mosel-Schiffahrtsweges 1964

Antoine Wehenkel (10 February 1907 – 27 February 1992) was a Luxembourgish politician and engineer. He was a member of the Luxembourg Socialist Workers' Party (LSAP), of which he was President (1970 – 1974).

Wehenkel was first elected to the Chamber of Deputies in 1951, and would continue to be so until 1974. Wehenkel withdrew from sitting as a deputy to take his place in the government of Pierre Werner between 1964 and 1969, holding the position of Minister for the Budget and the newly created office of Minister for the National Economy and Energy. With the LSAP ejected from government by a shift of coalition in 1969, Wehenkel turned to be President of the Chamber, which he remained until 1974, when he retired from politics.

He was a member of the communal council of Luxembourg City between 1951 and 1964.

He was awarded with being an Officer of the Legion of Honour and Commander of the Order of the Crown.

Political offices
New title Ministry created	Minister for the Economy; 1964 – 1969	Succeeded by Marcel Mart
New title Ministry created	Minister for Energy; 1964 – 1969	Succeeded by Marcel Mart
Preceded by Pierre Grégoire	President of the Chamber of Deputies; 1969 – 1974	Succeeded by René Van Den Bulcke
Party political offices
Preceded by Henry Cravatte	President of the LSAP; 1970 – 1974	Succeeded by Lydie Schmit
