= Albert Bousser =

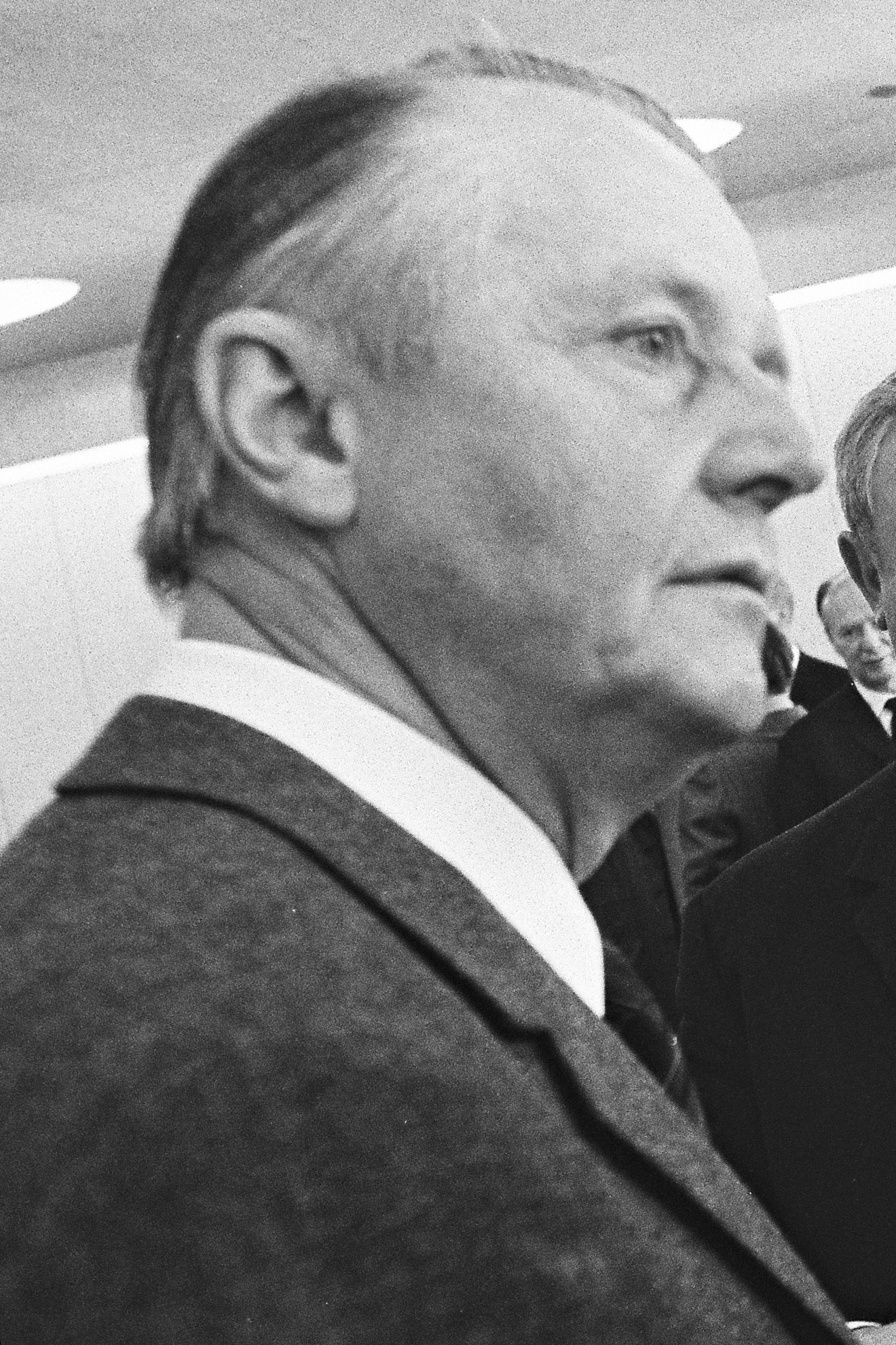
Bousser in 1968

Albert Bousser (8 February 1906 – 2 May 1995) was a Luxembourgish politician, railway inspector, and trade unionist.

Born on 8 February 1906 in Alzingen, Bousser studied in Paris at the École du génie civil, after which he became a railway inspector for Chemins de Fer Luxembourgeois, in which capacity he worked until 1969. He worked for the railway workers' union, first as Secretary (1945–1954) and later as President (1954–1964).

Bousser first entered the Chamber of Deputies in 1946, as he would remain until 1964, when he became a government minister, as Minister for Transport and Minister for Public Works (1964–1969). He briefly sat on the communal council of Luxembourg City (1950–1951), before moving to Howald, in Hesperange and serving as Mayor of Hesperange. During this time, he was President of the LSAP from 1952 to 1954.

He was instrumental, in 1971, to forming the Social Democratic Party. He was elected to the Chamber of Deputies again in the 1974 election, in which he sat until 1979.

Political offices
Preceded by Robert Schaffner	Minister for Public Works; 1964–1969	Succeeded by Jean-Pierre Büchler
Preceded by Pierre Grégoire	Minister for Transport; 1964–1969	Succeeded by Marcel Mart
Party political offices
Preceded by Paul Wilwertz	President of the LSAP; 1952–1954	Succeeded by Émile Ludwig
