= Nicolas Mosar =

Luxembourgish politician, jurist and diplomat

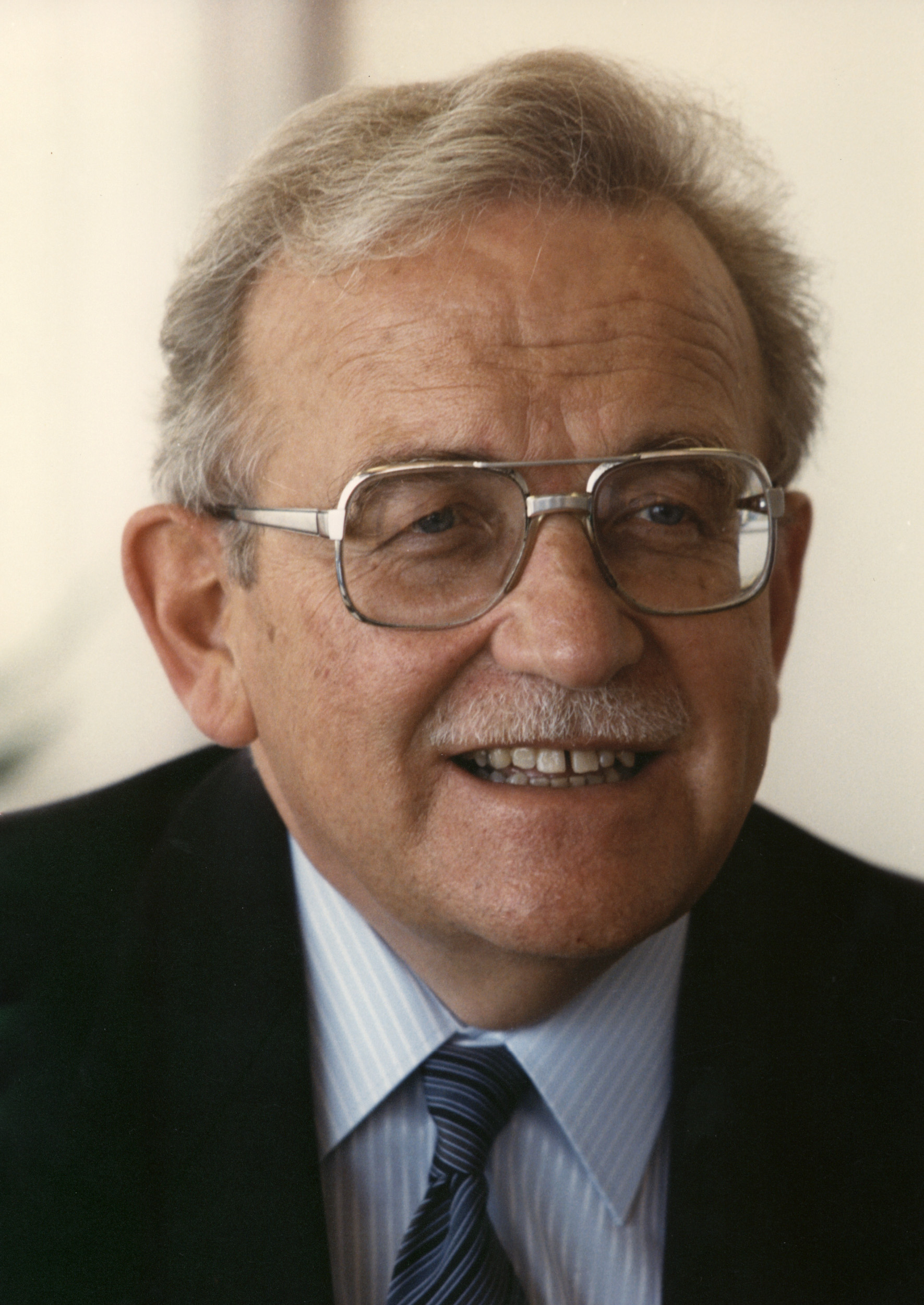
- Mosar in 1986

European Commissioner for Energy
- In office 5 January 1985 – 5 January 1989
- President: Jacques Delors
- Preceded by: Étienne Davignon
- Succeeded by: António Cardoso e Cunha

President of the Christian Social People's Party
- In office 1972–1974
- Preceded by: Jean Dupong
- Succeeded by: Jacques Santer

Personal details
- Born: 25 November 1927
- Died: 6 January 2004 (aged 76)
- Party: Christian Social People's Party

Nicolas "Nic" Mosar (25 November 1927 – 6 January 2004) was a Luxembourgish politician, jurist, and diplomat.

A Christian Social People's Party (CSV) member, Mosar was elected to the communal council of Luxembourg City in 1959, and sat in the council until 1984, including a period as an échevin. He first entered the Chamber of Deputies in 1969, and, excluding a two-year spell out (1974–1976) after the CSV's 1974 election defeat, sat in the Chamber until 1984. During this time, he was also President of the CSV (1972–1974).

Leaving domestic politics, Mosar replaced Gaston Thorn as Luxembourg's European Commissioner in 1985, taking on the brief of European Commissioner for Energy. After four years in the job, he moved to bilateral diplomacy, becoming Luxembourg's Ambassador to Italy (1989–1992).

He died in 2004. His son, Laurent, now sits in the Chamber of Deputies and Luxembourg City council for the CSV, just as Nicolas had.

Political offices
| Preceded by Étienne Davignon | European Commissioner for Energy; 1985–1989 | Succeeded by António Cardoso e Cunha |
| Preceded by Gaston Thorn | Luxembourgian European Commissioner; 1985–1989 | Succeeded by Jean Dondelinger |
