= Corinne Cahen =

Luxembourgish politician (born 1973)

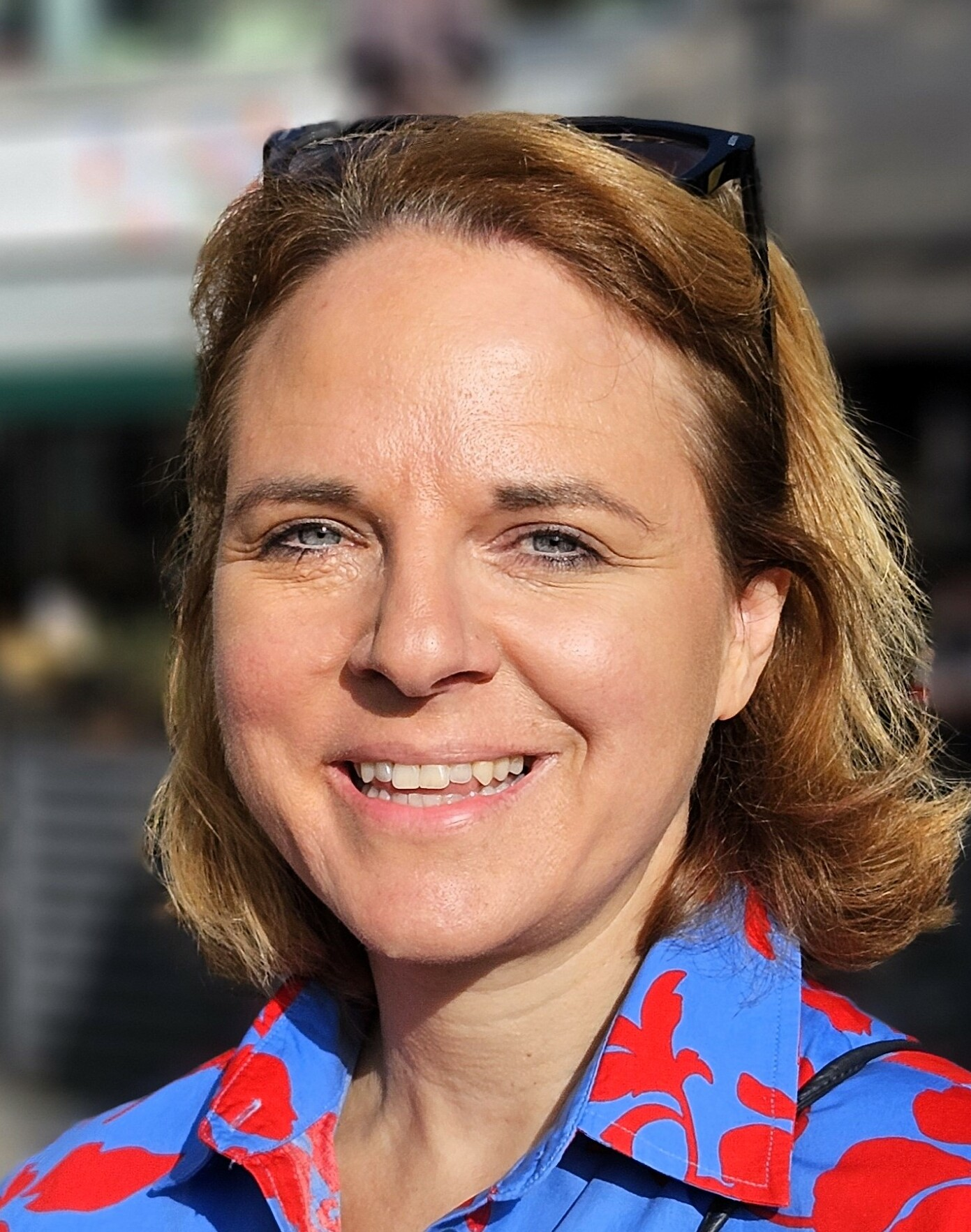
Corinne Cahen, October 2023.

Corinne Cahen (born 16 May 1973) is a Luxembourgish politician, entrepreneur and former journalist. A member of the Democratic Party (DP), of which she was the president from 2015 to 2022, she served as Minister for Family Affairs and Integration and Minister for the Greater Region from 2013 to 2023 in the Bettel I and II governments.

She has been a member of the Chamber of Deputies since 2023 and is an alderwoman of the City of Luxembourg.

== Early life and education ==
Cahen was born in Luxembourg City, and grew up in the Bonnevoie neighborhood. She studied applied foreign languages at the University of Strasbourg, specialising in translation. She subsequently studied applied foreign languages, specialising in business and commerce, at the University of Nice Sophia Antipolis (Maîtrise/Master). In 1997, she obtained a postgraduate degree in bilingual French-English journalism from the University of Paris III - Sorbonne Nouvelle.

== Career ==
=== Professional career ===
Cahen began her professional career as a journalist. She worked for several Luxembourg and international media organisations, including RTL Lëtzebuerg, Eldoradio, AFP and Radio France Internationale. Her journalistic career included work as a correspondent in France and assignments in Washington D.C., Paris and The Hague.

In 2001, she took over the family owned footwear business Chaussures Léon in Luxembourg City. She continued to work as a freelance journalist until 2006.

From 2007 to 2012, Cahen was president of the Union Commerciale de la Ville de Luxembourg, representing the interests of retailers in Luxembourg City.

From 2009 to 2013, she was an elected member of the Luxembourg Chamber of Commerce and served on the board of directors of the Confédération Luxembourgeoise du Commerce. She was also a founding member of the Fédération de la Mode.

=== Government ===
Cahen entered national politics as a candidate for the Democratic Party in the 2013 legislative elections. She was elected to the Chamber of Deputies and was subsequently appointed to the government in December 2013.

From 2013 to 2023, she served as Minister for Family and Integration and Minister for the Greater Region in the governments led by Prime Minister Xavier Bettel.

During her tenue as Minister for Family and Integration, Cahen was responsible for major reforms in family policy, social inclusion, intercultural integration, disabilities and elderly people.

Among the principal reforms undertaken during her tenue were:

- the reform of parental leave, which made parental leave more flexible and increased its financial compensation. The reform was designed to improve the reconciliation of family and professional life, strengthen the relationship between paretns and children and encourage greater participation by fathers. The new systeme entered into force in December 2016.

- the introduction of the Revenu d'inclusion sociale (REVIS), Luxembourg's social inclusion income scheme, which replaced the previous guaranteed minimum income system, RMG, and entered into force in January 2019.

- the reform of Luxembourg's accessibility legislation for persons with disabilities, culminating in the law of 7 January 2022 on accessibility for all of publicly accessible places, public roads and collective residential buildings.

- the accessibility law on accessibility requirements for products and services, transposing the EU Accessibility Act (law of 8 March 2023)

- the law on intercultural living together, which replaced the previous legal framework on the integration of foreigners. The reform introduced a broader concept based on participation, dialogue and social cohesion and established new national and communal instruments for intercultural living together.

- legislation concerning the quality of services for elderly people, establishing a new framework for the organisation and quality of services provided to older persons.

- the reform of family allowances, which restructered Luxembourg's system of family benefits and child allowances.

The reform of parental leave was presented by Cahen in 2015 as a means of making parental leave more flexible and better compensated, in response to financial and organisational barriers identified among parents. The reform sought, among other objectives, to increase the participation of fathers and the overall take-up of parental leave

The reform of intercultural policy represented a change from the previous integration framework towards a broader concept of vivre-ensemble interculturel. The government described the reform as a comprehensive restructuring of the instruments of intercultural living together, replacing the 2008 integration law. As part of the reform, new instruments were created to encourage participation at both national and municipal level

Cahen also presented the reform of Luxembourg's family benefits system and the subsequent implementation of the new family benefits framework during her time as minister

In the field of services for older people, Cahen presented government amendments to legislation concerning the quality of services for older persons in 2021

In the field of people with disabilities, Cahen made a law on accessibilty, adopted in 2022, that aimed at ensuring that public spaces, public roads and collective residential buildings are accessible to all persons, including persons with disabilities, thereby strengthening equal participation in society

In 2017, Cahen presented, together with the ministers responsible for education and culture, legislation recognising German sign language in its own right in Luxembourg.

=== President of the Democratic Party ===
Cahen was elected president of the Democratic Party in November 2015 and held the position until June 2022.

During her presidency, the DP contested three successive elections: the 2017 municipal elections, the 2018 legislative elections and the 2019 European Parliament elections.

Her presidency covered a period during which the DP was part of the national governing coalition and maintained a significant presence in Luxembourg's municipal and European political institutions.

=== Municipal politics ===
In July 2023, Cahen became an alderwoman of Luxembourg City.

Her responsibilities include social affairs, older people, integration, housing and matters relating to people with specific needs. In this role, she has continued to work on intercultural living together, social cohesion, integration and policies concerning elderly people.

=== Chamber of Deputies ===
Cahen was reelected to the Chamber of Deputies in the 2023 general election and has served as a member of Parliament since October 2023. She chairs the Committee on Mobility and Public Works and is also a member of the Committees on Labour, Health, Social Security, Media, Digitalisation.

She served as rapporteur for Luxembourg's 2025 state budget.

== Honours ==
- Portugal: Grand Cross of the Order of Merit (23 May 2017)
- France: Commander of the Legion of Honour
- Belgium: Grand Cross of the Order of Leopold II
- The Nederland: Order of Orange-Nassau
- Luxembourg: Grand Officer of the Order of Civil and Military Merit of Adolph of Nassau
