= 34th Chamber of Deputies of Luxembourg =

34th Chamber of Deputies
←	33rd	35th	→
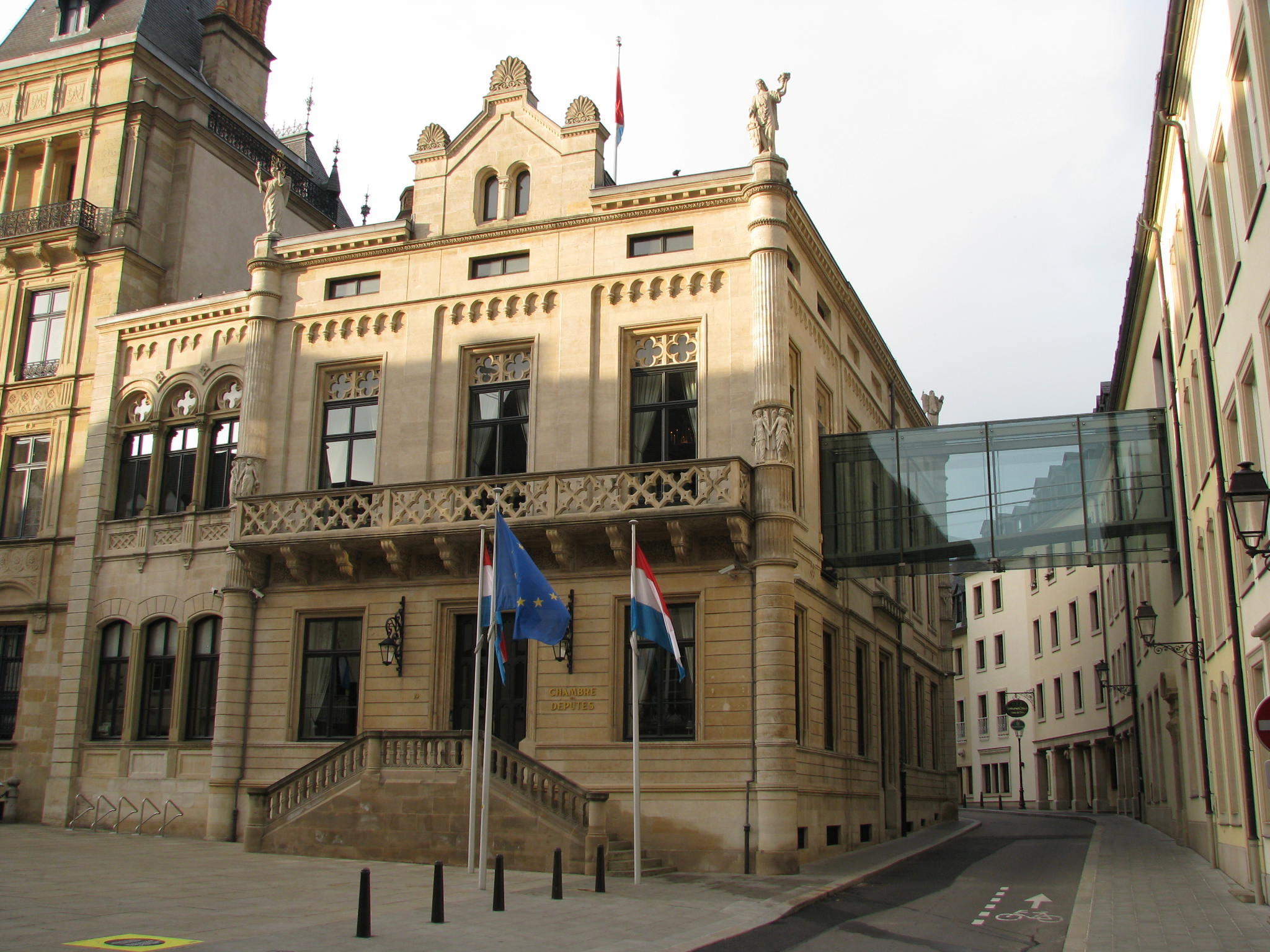

Overview
- Legislative body: Chamber of Deputies
- Meeting place: Hôtel de la Chambre, Krautmaart
- Term: 30 October 2018 – 24 October 2023
- Election: 2018 general election
- Government: Bettel II
- Website: www.chd.lu/en

Deputies
- Members: 60
- President: Fernand Etgen (DP)
- First Vice President: Claude Wiseler (CSV)
- Second Vice President: Mars Di Bartolomeo (LSAP)
- Third Vice President: Henri Kox (Gréng)

This is a list of members of the Chamber of Deputies of Luxembourg during the 2018–2023 legislature. The Chamber of Deputies is Luxembourg's national legislature, and consists of sixty deputies. They are elected once every five years by the Hagenbach-Bischoff method (a variation on the D'Hondt method) from one of four of Luxembourg's constituencies. The members in this list were elected in the 2018 election. As voters in Luxembourg vote for party lists, should a seat become vacant (through resignation, death or appointment to an incompatible office) there is no by-election. Instead, the candidate on the same list ranked directly below those already elected is invited to take the vacant seat.

The government during this legislature was the Bettel II Government, a coalition of the Democratic Party (DP), the Luxembourg Socialist Workers' Party (LSAP), and The Greens.

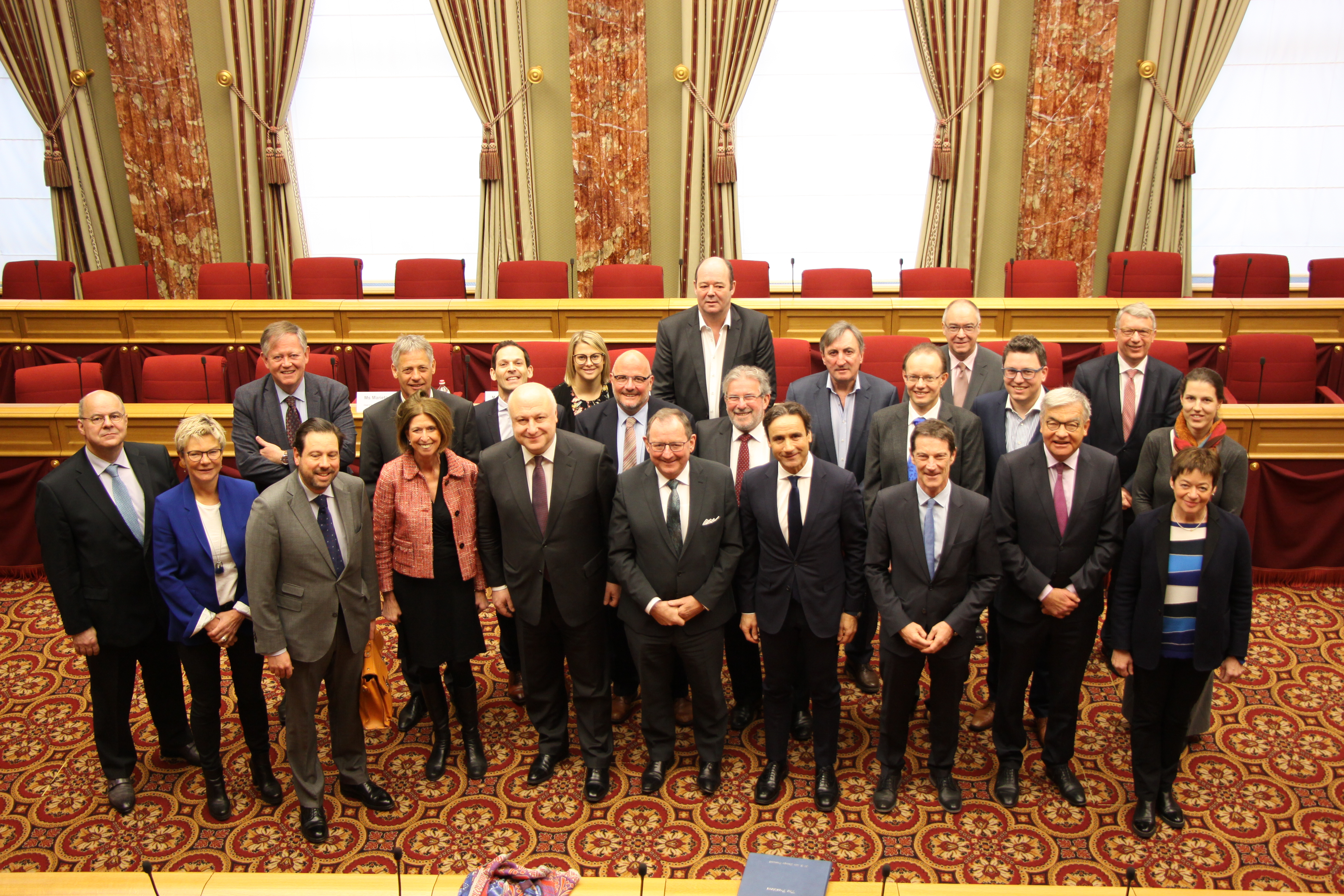
Group photo of some deputies (2019)

Name	Party	Constituency	Notes	Reference
André Bauler	DP	North		
Fernand Etgen	DP	North	President of the Chamber of Deputies.	
Claude Haagen	LSAP	North		
Stéphanie Empain	Greens	North		
Emile Eicher	CSV	North		
Martine Hansen	CSV	North	Leader of the CSV group	
Ali Kaes	CSV	North		
Marco Schank	CSV	North		
Jeff Engelen	ADR	North		
Gilles Baum	DP	East	Leader of the DP group	
Carole Hartmann	DP	East		
Tess Burton	LSAP	East		
Chantal Gary	Greens	East	Replaced Henri Kox in October 2019.	
Léon Gloden	CSV	East		
Françoise Hetto-Gaasch	CSV	East		
Octavie Modert	CSV	East		
Guy Arendt	DP	Centre		
Simone Beissel	DP	Centre		
Frank Colabianchi	DP	Centre		
Claude Lamberty	DP	Centre	Replaced Joëlle Elvinger in December 2019.	
Lydie Polfer	DP	Centre		
Francine Closener	LSAP	Centre	Replaced Marc Angel in October 2019.	
Cécile Hemmen	LSAP	Centre		
Jessie Thill	Greens	Centre	Replaced Carlo Back in January 2022.	
François Benoy	Greens	Centre		
Djuna Bernard	Greens	Centre		
Charles Margue	Greens	Centre		
Diane Adehm	CSV	Centre		
Paul Galles	CSV	Centre		
Marc Lies	CSV	Centre		
Laurent Mosar	CSV	Centre		
Viviane Reding	CSV	Centre		
Serge Wilmes	CSV	Centre		
Claude Wiseler	CSV	Centre		
Roy Reding	ADR	Centre		
Nathalie Oberweis	Left	Centre	Replaced David Wagner in May 2021.	
Sven Clement	Pirate	Centre		
Gusty Graas	DP	South		
Max Hahn	DP	South		
Pim Knaff	DP	South	Replaced Eugène Berger in January 2020.	
Simone Asselborn-Bintz	LSAP	South	Replaced Alex Bodry in January 2020.	
Dan Biancalana	LSAP	South		
Yves Cruchten	LSAP	South		
Mars Di Bartolomeo	LSAP	South		
Dan Kersch	LSAP	South	Replaced Georges Engel in January 2022.	
Lydia Mutsch	LSAP	South		
Semiray Ahmedova	Greens	South	Ahmedova replaced Roberto Traversini in October 2019.	
Marc Hansen	Greens	South		
Josée Lorsché	Greens	South	Leader of the Green group	
Nancy Arendt	CSV	South		
Félix Eischen	CSV	South		
Jean-Marie Halsdorf	CSV	South		
Georges Mischo	CSV	South		
Gilles Roth	CSV	South		
Marc Spautz	CSV	South		
Michel Wolter	CSV	South		
Fred Keup	ADR	South	Replaced Gaston Gibéryen in October 2020.	
Fernand Kartheiser	ADR	South		
Myriam Cecchetti	Left	South	Replaced Marc Baum in May 2021.	
Marc Goergen	Pirate	South		
