= 32nd Chamber of Deputies of Luxembourg =

32nd Chamber of Deputies
←	31st	33rd	→
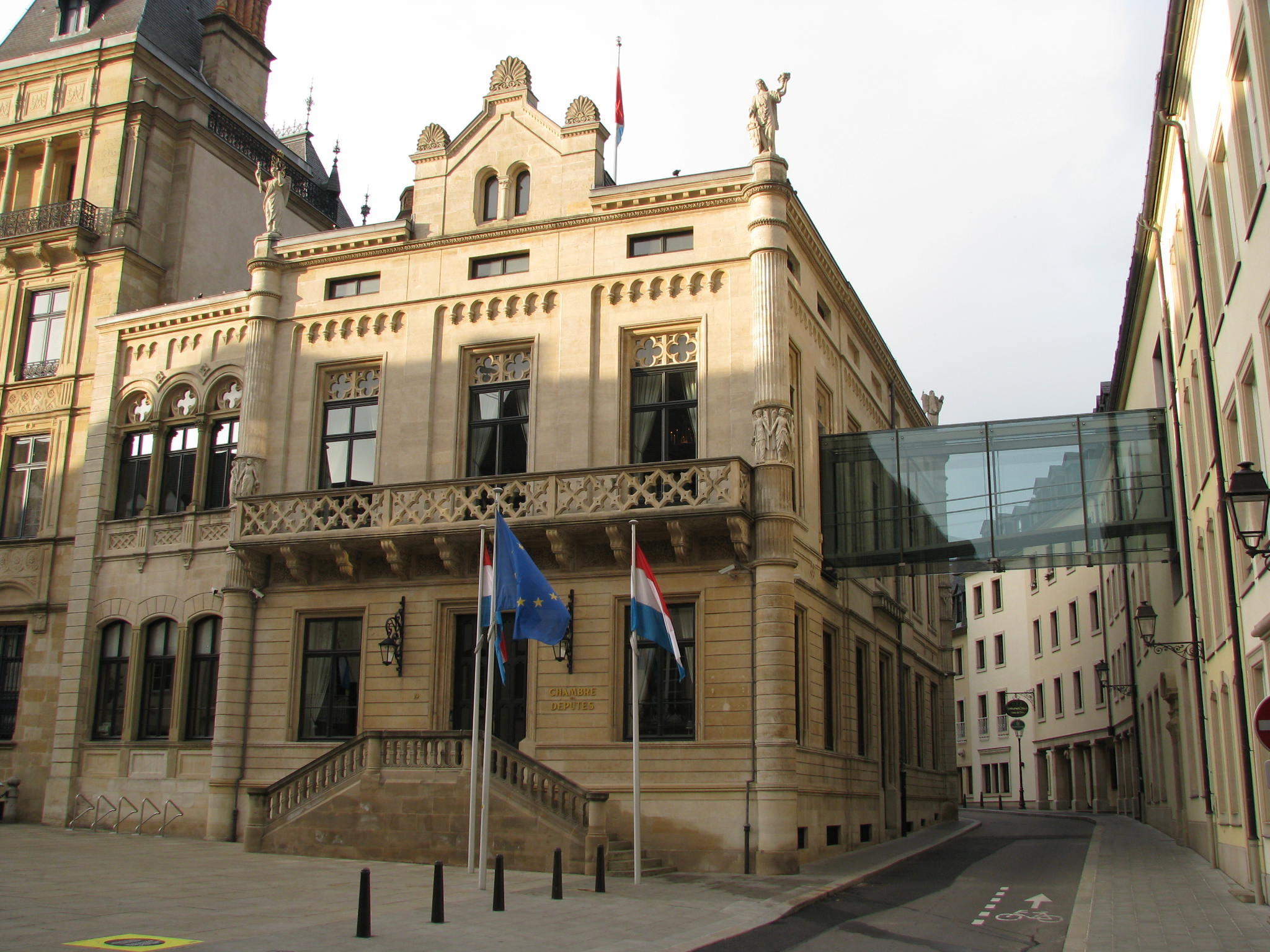

Overview
- Legislative body: Chamber of Deputies
- Meeting place: Hôtel de la Chambre, Krautmaart
- Term: 8 July 2009 – 12 November 2013
- Election: 2009 general election
- Government: Juncker–Asselborn II
- Website: www.chd.lu/en

Deputies
- Members: 60
- President: Laurent Mosar (CSV)
- Vice Presidents: Lydia Mutsch (LSAP); Lydie Polfer (DP); Michel Wolter (CSV)

This is a list of members of the Chamber of Deputies of Luxembourg during the 2009–2013 legislature. The Chamber of Deputies is Luxembourg's national legislature, and consists of sixty deputies. They are elected once every five years. The members that served in the 2009–2013 legislature were elected in 2009.

The government during this legislature was the Juncker–Asselborn II Government, a coalition of CSV and LSAP.

Name	Party	Conscription	Home town	Brief (if applicable)
Claude Adam	Greens	Centre	Mersch	
Sylvie Andrich-Duval	CSV	Sud	Dudelange	
Diane Adehm	CSV	Centre	Luxembourg City	
Marc Angel	LSAP	Centre	Luxembourg City	
André Bauler	DP	Nord	Ettelbruck	
François Bausch	Greens	Centre	Luxembourg City	Leader of the Greens group
Eugène Berger	DP	Sud	Peppange	
Xavier Bettel	DP	Centre	Luxembourg City	Leader of the DP group
Fernand Boden	CSV	Est	Echternach	
Alex Bodry	LSAP	Sud	Dudelange	
Anne Brasseur	DP	Centre	Luxembourg City	
Félix Braz	Greens	Sud	Esch-sur-Alzette	
Lucien Clement	CSV	Est	Remich	
Jean Colombera	ADR	Nord	Vichten	
Claudia Dall'Agnol	LSAP	Sud	Dudelange	
Fernand Diederich	LSAP	Centre	Colmar-Berg	
Christine Doerner	CSV	Sud	Bettembourg	
Emile Eicher	CSV	Nord	Marnach	
Félix Eischen	CSV	Sud	Kehlen	
Lydie Err	LSAP	Sud	Bereldange	
Fernand Etgen	DP	Nord	Oberfeulen	
Ben Fayot	LSAP	Centre	Luxembourg City	
Marie-Josée Frank	CSV	Est	Olingen	
Gaston Gibéryen	ADR	Sud	Frisange	Leader of the ADR 'sensibility'
Camille Gira	Greens	Nord	Beckerich	
Léon Gloden	CSV	Est	Grevenmacher	
Claude Haagen	LSAP	Nord	Diekirch	
Norbert Haupert	CSV	Sud	Mondercange	
Paul Helminger	DP	Centre	Luxembourg City	
Jacques-Yves Henckes	ADR	Centre	Luxembourg City	
André Hoffmann	The Left	Sud	Esch-sur-Alzette	Leader of the Left 'sensibility'
Ali Kaes	CSV	Nord	Brandenbourg	
Fernand Kartheiser	ADR	Sud	Sprinkange	
Nancy Kemp-Arendt	CSV	Sud	Mondercange	
Jean-Pierre Klein	LSAP	Centre	Heisdorf	
Henri Kox	Greens	Est	Remich	
Marc Lies	CSV	Centre	Hesperange	
Josée Lorsché	Greens	Sud	Noertzange	
Viviane Loschetter	Greens	Centre	Luxembourg City	
Lucien Lux	LSAP	Sud	Bettembourg	Leader of the LSAP group
Claude Meisch	DP	Sud	Differdange	
Paul-Henri Meyers	CSV	Centre	Luxembourg City	
Laurent Mosar	CSV	Centre	Luxembourg City	President of the Chamber
Lydia Mutsch	LSAP	Sud	Esch-sur-Alzette	Vice-President of the Chamber
Roger Negri	LSAP	Sud	Mamer	
Marcel Oberweis	CSV	Centre	Steinsel	
Lydie Polfer	DP	Centre	Luxembourg City	Vice-President of the Chamber
Gilles Roth	CSV	Sud	Mamer	
Jean-Paul Schaaf	CSV	Nord	Ettelbruck	
Ben Scheuer	LSAP	Est	Luxembourg City	
Tessy Scholtes	CSV	Centre	Heisdorf	
Marc Spautz	CSV	Sud	Schifflange	
Vera Spautz	LSAP	Sud	Esch-sur-Alzette	
Martine Stein-Mergen	CSV	Centre	Luxembourg City	
Lucien Thiel	CSV	Centre	Luxembourg City	
Carlo Wagner	DP	Est	Wormeldange	
Robert Weber	CSV	Sud	Peppange	
Lucien Weiler	CSV	Nord	Diekirch	
Raymond Weydert	CSV	Centre	Niederanven	
Michel Wolter	CSV	Sud	Bascharage	Vice-President of the Chamber
