= 31st Chamber of Deputies of Luxembourg =

This is a list of members of the Chamber of Deputies of Luxembourg between 2004 and 2009. The Chamber of Deputies is Luxembourg's national legislature, and consists of sixty deputies. The members that served in the 2004–2009 legislature were elected in 2004.

The government during this legislature was the Juncker–Asselborn I Government, a coalition of CSV and LSAP.

Name	Party	Conscription	Home town	Brief (if applicable)
Claude Adam	Greens	Centre	Mersch	
Sylvie Andrich-Duval	CSV	Sud	Dudelange	
Marc Angel	LSAP	Centre	Luxembourg City	
François Bausch	Greens	Centre	Luxembourg City	Leader of the Greens group
Eugène Berger	DP	Sud	Peppange	
Xavier Bettel	DP	Centre	Luxembourg City	
Alex Bodry	LSAP	Sud	Dudelange	
Anne Brasseur	DP	Centre	Luxembourg City	
Félix Braz	Greens	Sud	Esch-sur-Alzette	
John Castegnaro	LSAP	Sud	Rumelange	
Lucien Clement	CSV	Est	Remich	
Claudia Dall'Agnol	LSAP	Sud	Dudelange	
Fernand Diederich	LSAP	Centre	Colmar-Berg	
Christine Doerner	CSV	Sud	Bettembourg	
Lydie Err	LSAP	Sud	Bereldange	
Fernand Etgen	DP	Nord	Oberfeulen	
Ben Fayot	LSAP	Centre	Luxembourg City	Leader of the LSAP group
Colette Flesch	DP	Centre	Luxembourg City	
Marie-Josée Frank	CSV	Est	Olingen	
Fabienne Gaul	CSV	Centre	Itzig	
Gaston Gibéryen	ADR	Sud	Frisange	Leader of the ADR 'sensibility'
Camille Gira	Greens	Nord	Beckerich	
Marcel Glesener	CSV	Sud	Peppange	
Charles Goerens	DP	Nord	Schieren	Leader of the DP group
Norbert Haupert	CSV	Sud	Mondercange	
Paul Helminger	DP	Centre	Luxembourg City	
Jacques-Yves Henckes	ADR	Centre	Luxembourg City	
Françoise Hetto-Gaasch	CSV	Est	Junglinster	
Jean Huss	Greens	Sud	Esch-sur-Alzette	
Aly Jaerling	Independent	Sud	Esch-sur-Alzette	
Ali Kaes	CSV	Nord	Brandenbourg	
Nancy Kemp-Arendt	CSV	Sud	Mondercange	
Jean-Pierre Klein	LSAP	Centre	Heisdorf	
Jean-Pierre Koepp	ADR	Nord	Hoscheid-Dickt	
Henri Kox	Greens	Est	Remich	
Alex Krieps	DP	Centre	Medingen	
Viviane Loschetter	Greens	Centre	Luxembourg City	
Robert Mehlen	ADR	Est	Manternach	
Claude Meisch	DP	Sud	Differdange	
Paul-Henri Meyers	CSV	Centre	Luxembourg City	
Laurent Mosar	CSV	Centre	Luxembourg City	
Lydia Mutsch	LSAP	Sud	Esch-sur-Alzette	
Roger Negri	LSAP	Sud	Mamer	
Marcel Oberweis	CSV	Centre	Steinsel	
Gilles Roth	CSV	Sud	Mamer	
Marcel Sauber	CSV	Centre	Walferdange	
Jean-Paul Schaaf	CSV	Nord	Ettelbruck	
Marco Schank	CSV	Nord	Eschdorf	
Jos Scheuer	LSAP	Est	Echternach	
Romain Schneider	LSAP	Nord	Wiltz	
Roland Schreiner	LSAP	Sud	Schifflange	
Marc Spautz	CSV	Sud	Schifflange	
Vera Spautz	LSAP	Sud	Esch-sur-Alzette	
Martine Stein-Mergen	CSV	Centre	Luxembourg City	
Fred Sunnen	CSV	Sud	Belvaux	
Lucien Thiel	CSV	Centre	Luxembourg City	
Carlo Wagner	DP	Est	Wormeldange	
Lucien Weiler	CSV	Nord	Diekirch	President of the Chamber
Raymond Weydert	CSV	Centre	Niederanven	
Michel Wolter	CSV	Sud	Bascharage	Leader of the CSV group
