= Party for Integral Democracy =

Political party in Luxembourg

The Party for Full Democracy (Luxembourgish: Partei fir Integral Demokratie, French: Parti pour la democratie integrale, German: Partei für Integrale Demokratie), abbreviated to PID, is a political party in Luxembourg. It was founded in 2013 by Jean Colombera, a member of the Chamber of Deputies that had been elected for the Alternative Democratic Reform Party at the 2009 election. The party ran in the 2013 election, with Colombera leading the list in Nord, but did not win any seats.
