= Charles Weiler =

Luxembourgish politician

The Honourable Charel Weiler
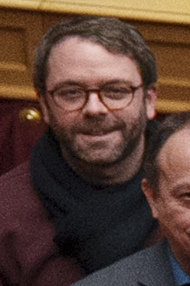
- Weiler in 2026

Member of the Chamber of Deputies
- Incumbent
- Assumed office 24 October 2023
- Constituency: North

Mayor of Diekirch
- Incumbent
- Assumed office 11 July 2023
- Preceded by: Claude Thill

Personal details
- Born: 18 September 1986 (age 39) Luxembourg City, Luxembourg
- Party: Christian Social People's Party
- Parent: Lucien Weiler (father)

Charles Weiler, also known as Charel Weiler (born 18 September 1986) is a Luxembourgish politician of the Christian Social People's Party (CSV). Since 2023, he has served as a member of the Chamber of Deputies from the North constituency. He also serves as mayor of Diekirch since 2023.

He is the son of fellow CSV politician Lucien Weiler (1951-2026), who served as President of the Chamber of Deputies from 2004 to 2009.
