= Ben Polidori =

Luxembourgish politician (born 1989)

The Honourable Ben Polidori
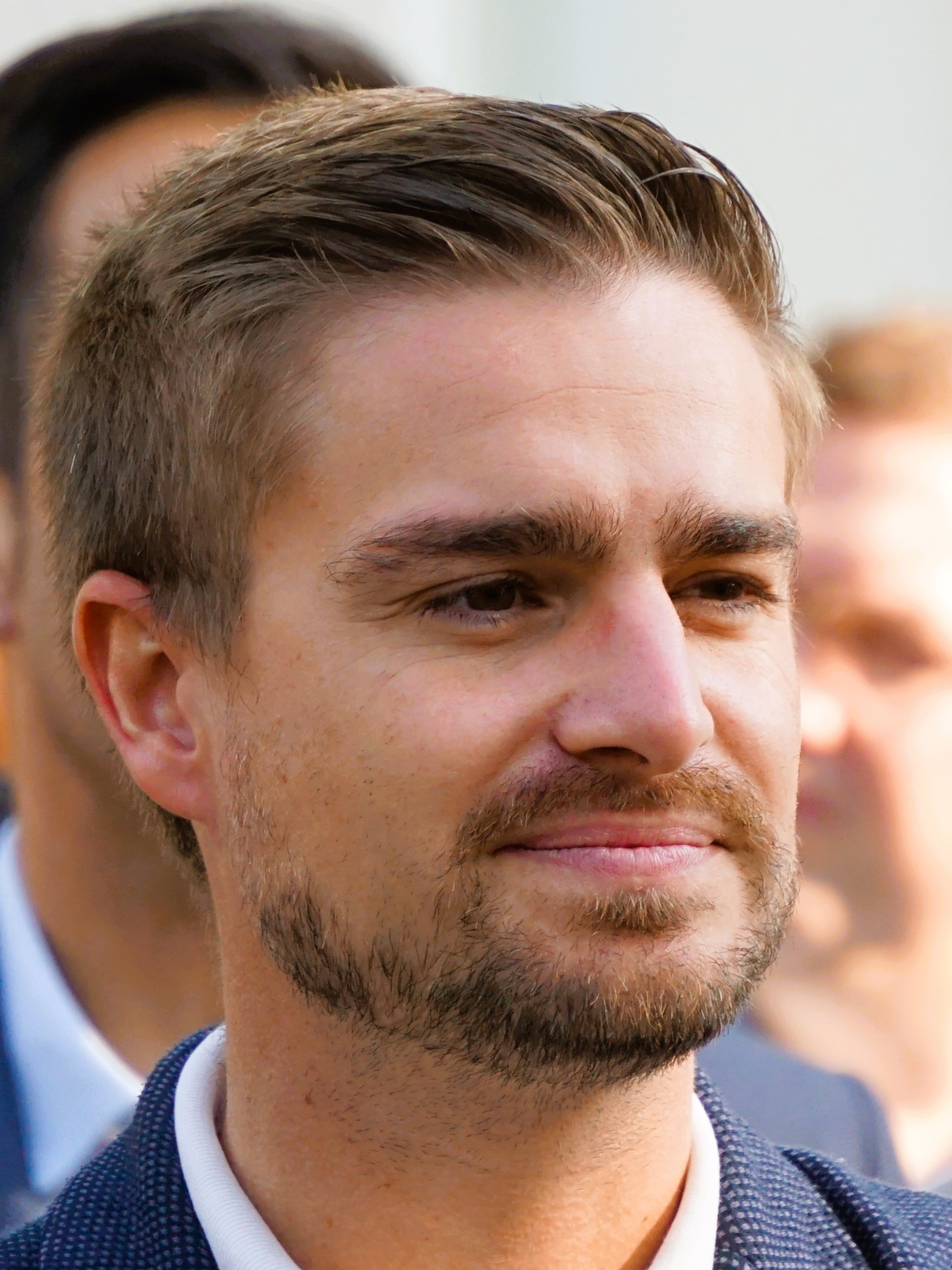
- Polidori in 2024

Member of the Chamber of Deputies
- Incumbent
- Assumed office 24 October 2023
- Constituency: Nord

Personal details
- Born: 13 November 1989 (age 36) Esch-sur-Alzette, Luxembourg
- Party: Luxembourg Socialist Workers' Party (2024–present)
- Other political affiliations: Pirate (2020-2024)

Ben Polidori (born 13 November 1989) is a Luxembourgish politician. Since 2023, he has served as a member of the Chamber of Deputies from North. Originally a member of the Pirate Party, he left the party in 2024 and briefly became an independent before joining the LSAP.
