= André Bauler =

Luxembourgish politician (born 1964)

The Honourable André Bauler
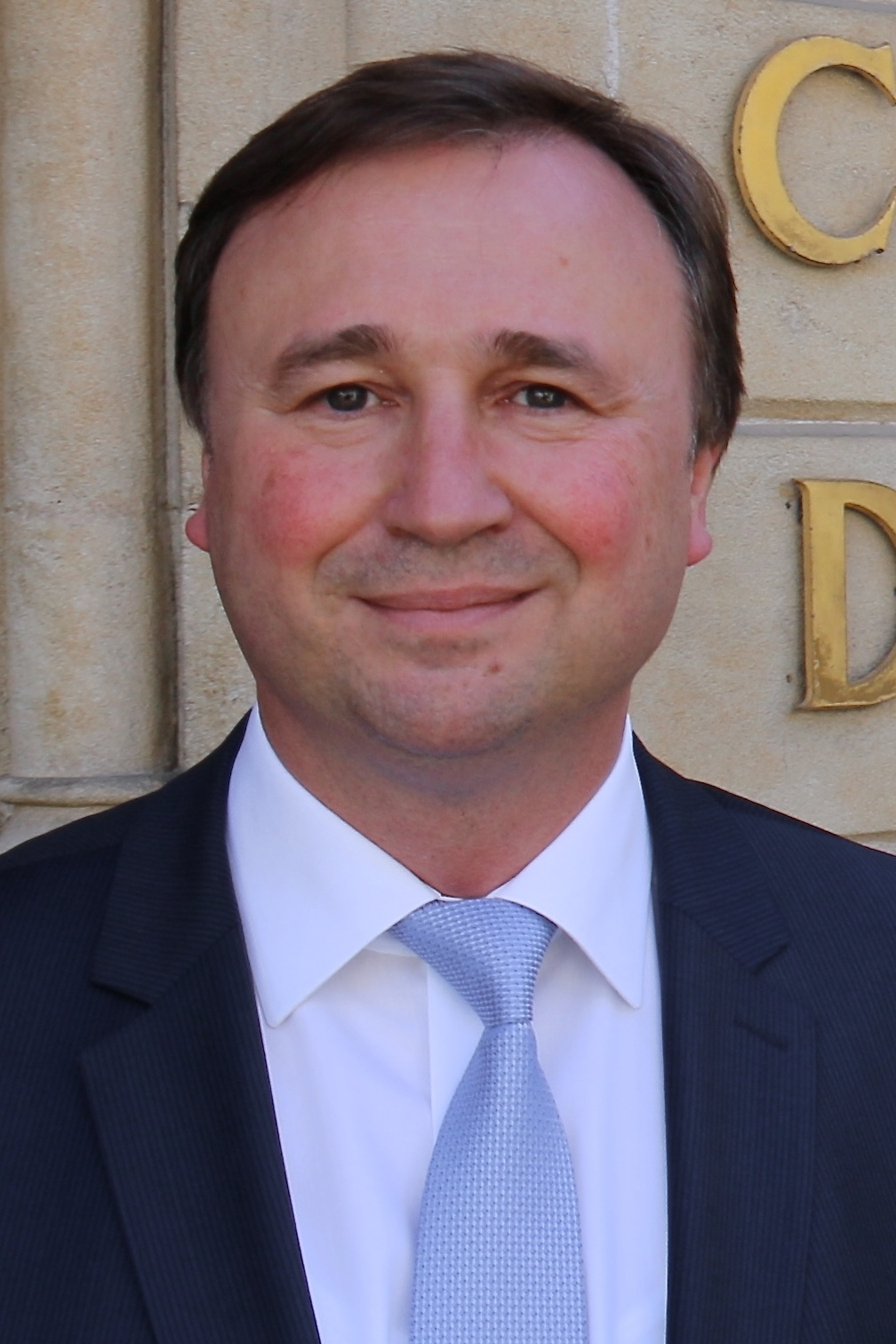
- Bauler in 2015

Vice President of the Chamber of Deputies
- Incumbent
- Assumed office 20 January 2026 Serving with Michel Wolter and Mars Di Bartolomeo
- President: Claude Wiseler
- Preceded by: Fernand Etgen

Member of the Chamber of Deputies
- Incumbent
- Assumed office 1 April 2014
- Preceded by: Marc Hansen
- Constituency: North
- In office 8 July 2009 – 4 December 2013
- Succeeded by: Marc Hansen
- Constituency: North

State Secretary for Education, Childhood and Youth, Higher Education and Research
- In office 4 December 2013 – 28 March 2014
- Prime Minister: Xavier Bettel
- Succeeded by: Marc Hansen

Mayor of Erpeldange
- In office 21 November 2011 – 4 December 2013
- Preceded by: François Dahm
- Succeeded by: Claude Gleis

Personal details
- Born: 5 February 1964 (age 62) Ettelbruck, Luxembourg
- Party: Democratic

André Bauler (born 5 February 1964) is a Luxembourgish politician of the Democratic Party (DP). He has served as a member of the Chamber of Deputies from the North constituency since 2009, except for a brief stint as Secretary of State for Education and Research from December 2013 to March 2014. He became Vice President of the Chamber in 2026, following the retirement of party colleague Fernand Etgen.

== Education and Academic Background ==
After completing his secondary education at the Lycée classique de Diekirch from 1976 to 1983, Bauler pursued higher education at the Centre Universitaire de Luxembourg in 1984 and at the Catholic University of Louvain from 1985 to 1987. He earned a degree in economics in 1987.

== Professional career ==
Bauler worked as a professor of economics and social sciences from 1990 to 2009.

== Political career ==
=== Local Politics ===
A member of the DP since 1993, Bauler first served as a member of the communal council of Erpeldange (Note: The commune was renamed Erpeldange-sur-Sûre in 2014 through a bill introduced by Bauler.) from 2005 to 2007. He then served as Chief Alderman from 2007 to 2011 and later became mayor from 2011 to 2013, a position he held until his appointment to the government.

=== National Politics ===
On the national level, Bauler was first elected to the Chamber of Deputies in 2009, representing the DP for the North Constituency. During his tenure in the Chamber, he has held several key positions, including vice-president of the Committee on Economy, Foreign Trade, and Social Economy (2009–2011), vice-president of the Committee on Labor and Employment (2009–2013), vice-president of the Committee on Small and Medium-sized Enterprises and Tourism (2009–2013) and vice-president of the Committee on National Education, Vocational Training, and Sports (2011–2013)

Following the 2013 snap general election, Bauler was appointed Secretary of State for the Ministry of National Education, Children, and Youth and Secretary of State for Higher Education and Research on 4 December 2013 in the Bettel Government. He left his position as Secretary of State on 28 March 2014, and resumed his duties as a deputy.

In the 2018 election, he was re-elected for a third consecutive term. Since 2018, he has served as Chairman of the Finance and Budget Committee in the Chamber of Deputies. In January 2019, he was appointed State Budget Rapporteur.

In the 2023 election, Bauler was directly re-elected to the Chamber of Deputies, where he also serves, among other functions, again as the Chairman of the Culture Committee an vice-president of the Finance Committee. He is also a member of the Executive Office of the Chamber.

Since January 2026, André Bauler has served as vice-president of the Chamber of Deputies.
