= Jean-Pierre Koepp =

Luxembourgish politician (1934–2010)

Jean-Pierre Koepp (26 April 1934 in Holzthum - 3 August 2010 in Ettelbruck) was a Luxembourgish politician and restaurateur. He was a representative of the Alternative Democratic Reform Party (ADR), having been one of the ADR's founder-members and one of their first members of the Chamber of Deputies, in which he sat between 1989 and 2009.

Koepp was elected to the Chamber to represent the Nord constituency at the 1989 general election, with the ADR, then a single-issue pensioners' party called the 'Action Committee 5/6ths Pensions for Everyone', scoring a remarkable electoral upset in securing four seats in the Chamber. He was re-elected in 1994, when the ADR increased their representation in the Chamber to five seats.

In the 1999 general election, he placed first on the ADR list, with two being elected, and came third amongst all candidates (behind only ministers-to-be Charles Goerens and Marie-Josée Jacobs). In 2004, Koepp came first amongst ADR candidates again, albeit with a greatly reduced vote count. Nonetheless, the ADR still won enough votes for one deputy to be returned, allowing Koepp to be re-elected. He did not run in the 2009 election, leaving the top place on the list to Jean Colombera.

He died in 2010, at the age of 76.
