= Charles Goerens =

Luxembourgish politician (born 1952)

Charles Goerens MEP
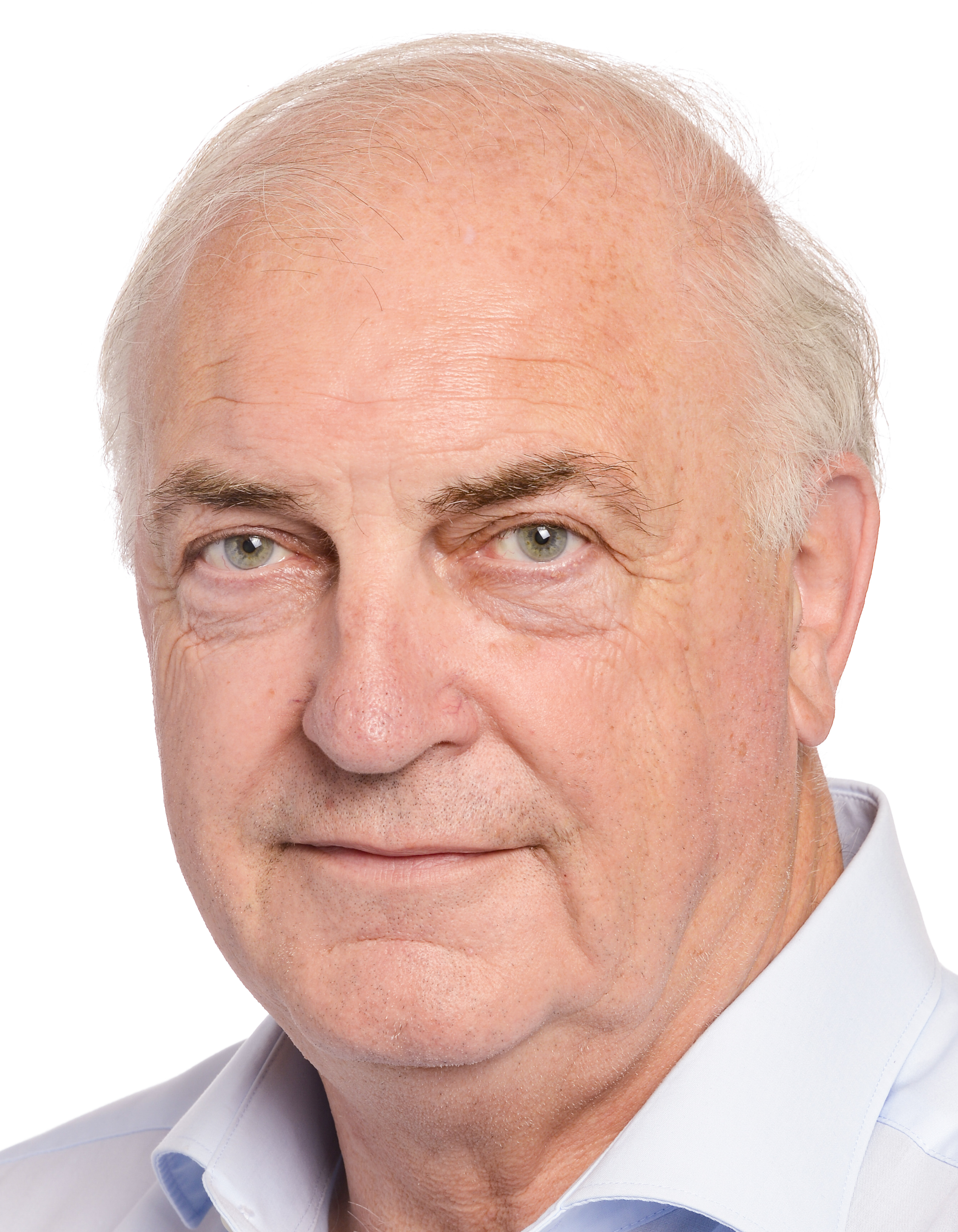
- Official portrait, 2019

Member of the European Parliament
- Incumbent
- Assumed office 14 July 2009
- Constituency: Luxembourg
- In office 25 October 1994 – 6 August 1999
- Constituency: Luxembourg
- In office 15 February 1982 – 23 July 1984
- Preceded by: Jean Hamilius
- Constituency: Luxembourg

Member of the Chamber of Deputies
- In office 3 August 2004 – 8 July 2009
- Succeeded by: André Bauler
- Constituency: North
- In office 6 July 1979 – 25 October 1994
- Succeeded by: Agnès Durdu
- Constituency: North

Minister for Foreign Affairs
- In office 20 July 2004 – 31 July 2004
- Prime Minister: Jean-Claude Juncker
- Government: Juncker–Polfer
- Preceded by: Lydie Polfer
- Succeeded by: Jean Asselborn

Minister for Cooperation, Humanitarian Action and Defence
- In office 7 August 1999 – 31 July 2004
- Prime Minister: Jean-Claude Juncker
- Government: Juncker–Polfer
- Preceded by: Jacques Poos (Cooperation); Alex Bodry (Public Force)
- Succeeded by: Jean-Louis Schiltz (Cooperation and Humanitarian Action); Luc Frieden (Defence)

Minister for the Environment
- In office 7 August 1999 – 31 July 2004
- Prime Minister: Jean-Claude Juncker
- Government: Juncker–Polfer
- Preceded by: Alex Bodry
- Succeeded by: Lucien Lux

Personal details
- Born: Charles Nicolas Goerens; 6 February 1952 (age 74) Ettelbruck, Luxembourg
- Party: Luxembourgish; Democratic Party; EU; Alliance of Liberals and Democrats for Europe; Renew Europe

Charles Nicolas Goerens (born 6 February 1952) is a Luxembourgish politician and Member of the European Parliament (MEP) from Luxembourg. He is a member of the Democratic Party (DP), part of the Alliance of Liberals and Democrats for Europe. He was the lead candidate and only elected MEP for the DP in the 2024 European Elections.

== Early career ==
He studied agricultural science before he was first elected to the northern district constituency as a member of the Democratic Party in 1979. From 1989 until 1994 he was its chairman.

== Political career ==
Goerens was a member of the European Parliament from 1982 to 1984, from 1994 to 1999, and again from 2009 to present.

He served as Minister for Cooperation, Humanitarian Action, and Defence in the government of Jean-Claude Juncker from 7 August 1999 until 31 July 2004. He also briefly served as Minister for Foreign Affairs from 20 July 2004 until 31 July 2004. He lost these posts when Juncker had to form a new coalition government after the 2004 parliamentary elections.

Since 2009, Goerens has been serving as a member of the Committee on Development and of the Subcommittee on Human Rights.

During the Brexit negotiations, Goerens had advocated for associate membership of the United Kingdom to the European Union.

Following the 2019 European Parliament election, he also became a vice-chair of the Committee on Constitutional Affairs.

In addition to his committee assignments, Goerens is a member of the European Parliament Intergroup on Extreme Poverty and Human Rights, the MEPs Against Cancer group (since 2019). and the Responsible Business Conduct Working Group. He also co-chairs the cross-party Working Group on Fair Trade (sponsored by Fair Trade Advocacy).

== Other activities ==
- Friends of the Global Fund, Vice-Chair of the Board
- Fondation pour la construction de l'avenir du Luxembourg (FOCAL), Member of the Board

Since 1997 Charles Goerens has been organising educational trips to Auschwitz, as part of his efforts to fight against racism, xenophobia, and antisemitism.

Political offices
Preceded by Alex Bodry	Minister for Cooperation, Humanitarian Action, and Defence; 1999–2004	Succeeded by Jean-Louis Schiltz
Preceded by Alex Bodry	Minister for the Environment; 1999–2004	Succeeded by Lucien Lux
Preceded by Lydie Polfer	Minister of Foreign Affairs; 2004	Succeeded by Jean Asselborn
Party political offices
Preceded by Colette Flesch	President of the DP; 1989–1994	Succeeded by Lydie Polfer
