= Emile Eicher =

Luxembourgish politician (born 1955)

The Honourable Emile Eicher
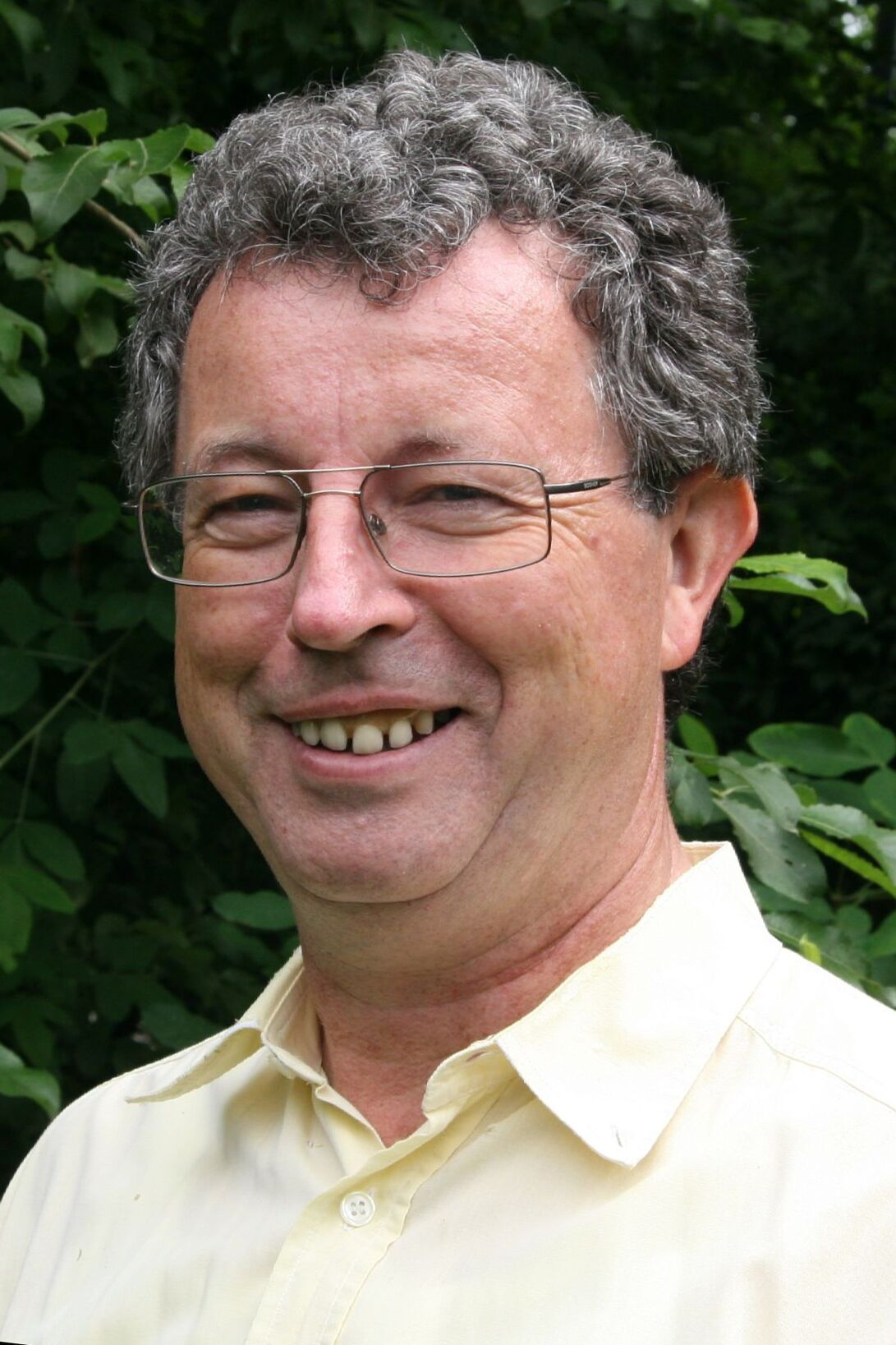
- Eicher in 2008

Member of the Chamber of Deputies
- Incumbent
- Assumed office 28 July 2009
- Preceded by: Marco Schank
- Constituency: North

Mayor of Clervaux
- In office 24 November 2011 – 18 July 2023
- Preceded by: Yves Arend
- Succeeded by: Georges Keipes

Mayor of Munshausen
- In office 1 January 1994 – 23 November 2011
- Preceded by: Jean-Baptiste Stempel
- Succeeded by: commune merged into Clervaux

Personal details
- Born: 30 June 1955 (age 70) Clervaux, Luxembourg
- Party: Christian Social People's Party

Emile Eicher (born 30 June 1955) is a Luxembourgish politician. He has served as a member of the Chamber of Deputies from North since 2009. He is a member of the Christian Social People's Party.
