= Jessie Thill =

Luxembourgish politician (born 1996)

Member of the Chamber of Deputies
- In office 19 January 2022 – 24 October 2023
- Preceded by: Carlo Back
- Constituency: Centre

Personal details
- Born: 10 February 1996 (age 30)
- Party: The Greens

Jessie Thill (born 10 February 1996) is a Luxembourgish politician of The Greens who was a member of the Chamber of Deputies from 2022 to 2023. From 2019 to 2021, she served as spokesperson of the party's youth wing déi jonk gréng. In the 2017 communal elections, she was elected councillor of Walferdange.
