= Camille Gira =

Luxembourgish politician (1958–2018)

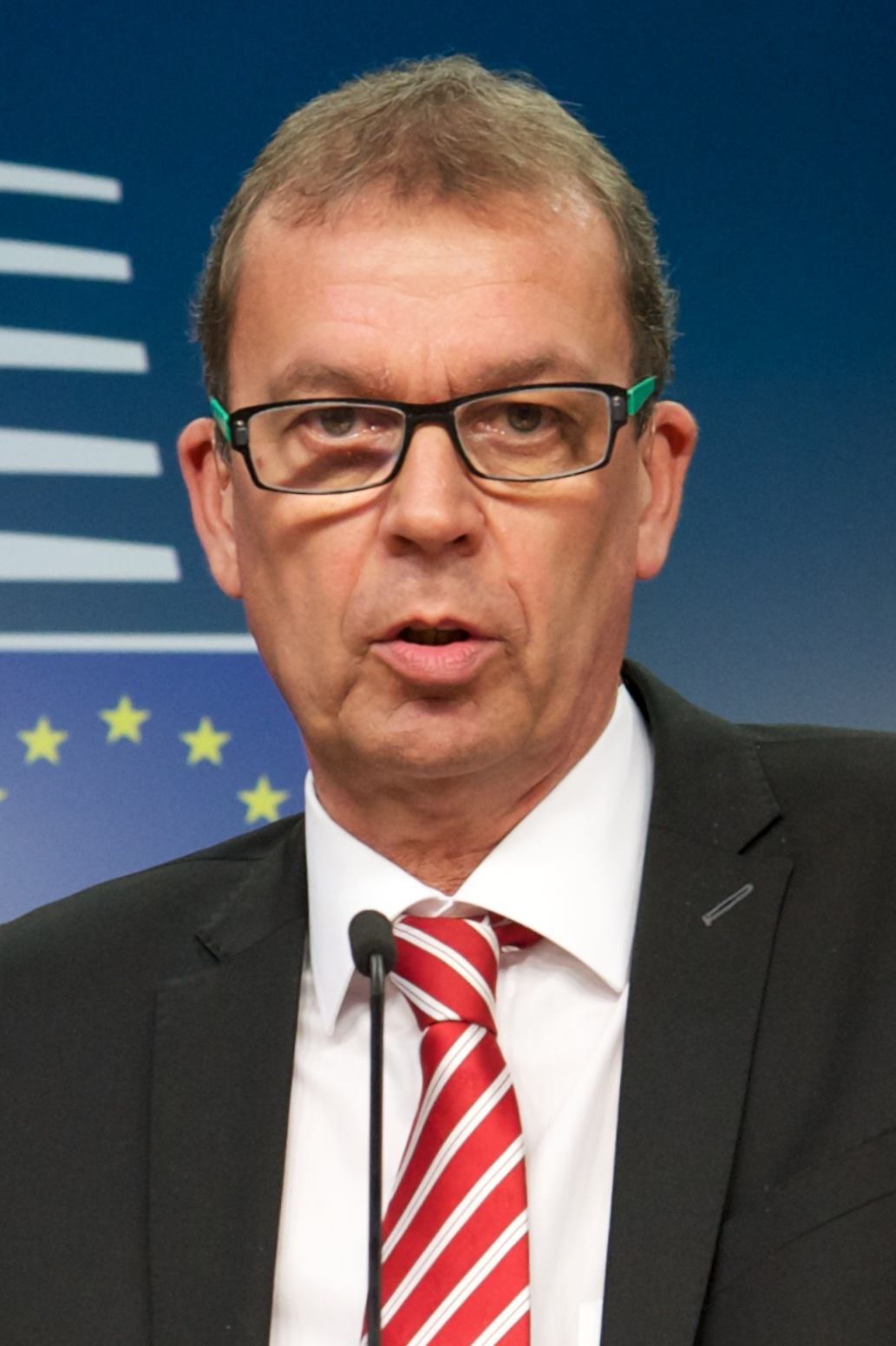
- Gira in 2015

State Secretary for Sustainable Development and Infrastructure
- In office 4 December 2013 – 16 May 2018
- Prime Minister: Xavier Bettel
- Preceded by: Marco Schank
- Succeeded by: Claude Turmes

Member of the Chamber of Deputies
- In office 18 July 1994 – 4 December 2013
- Succeeded by: Christiane Wickler
- Constituency: North

Mayor of Beckerich
- In office 11 May 1990 – 4 December 2013
- Monarchs: Jean; Henri
- Preceded by: Joseph Seyler
- Succeeded by: Thierry Lagoda

Personal details
- Born: 22 October 1958 Luxembourg City, Luxembourg
- Died: 16 May 2018 (aged 59) Luxembourg City, Luxembourg
- Party: The Greens (Luxembourg)
- Occupation: Politician

Camille Gira (2 June 1958 – 16 May 2018) was a Luxembourgish politician for the Greens.

Born in Luxembourg City, Gira was a member of the national legislature, the Chamber of Deputies, representing the North constituency from 1994 to 2013.

He was mayor of Beckerich, first elected on 11 May 1990, making him the first Green mayor in Luxembourg. Prior to that, he had been an alderman in the commune since 1982.

He was an air traffic controller at Luxembourg-Findel International Airport between 1977 and his election to the Chamber in 1994.

Gira collapsed while delivering a speech in parliament on 16 May 2018. He was rushed to hospital but died later that day from heart failure.
