= Sylvie Andrich-Duval =

Luxembourgish politician

Member of the Chamber of Deputies
- In office October 2005 – 2018
- Parliamentary group: Christian Social People's Party

Sylvie Andrich-Duval (born 22 August 1958) is a Luxembourgish politician. She is a former member of the Chamber of Deputies, where she represented the Christian Social People's Party. She was first elected to the Chamber of Deputies in October 2005, and held her seat until the 2018 Luxembourg general election.
