= Lucien Weiler =

Luxembourgish politician and jurist (1951–2026)

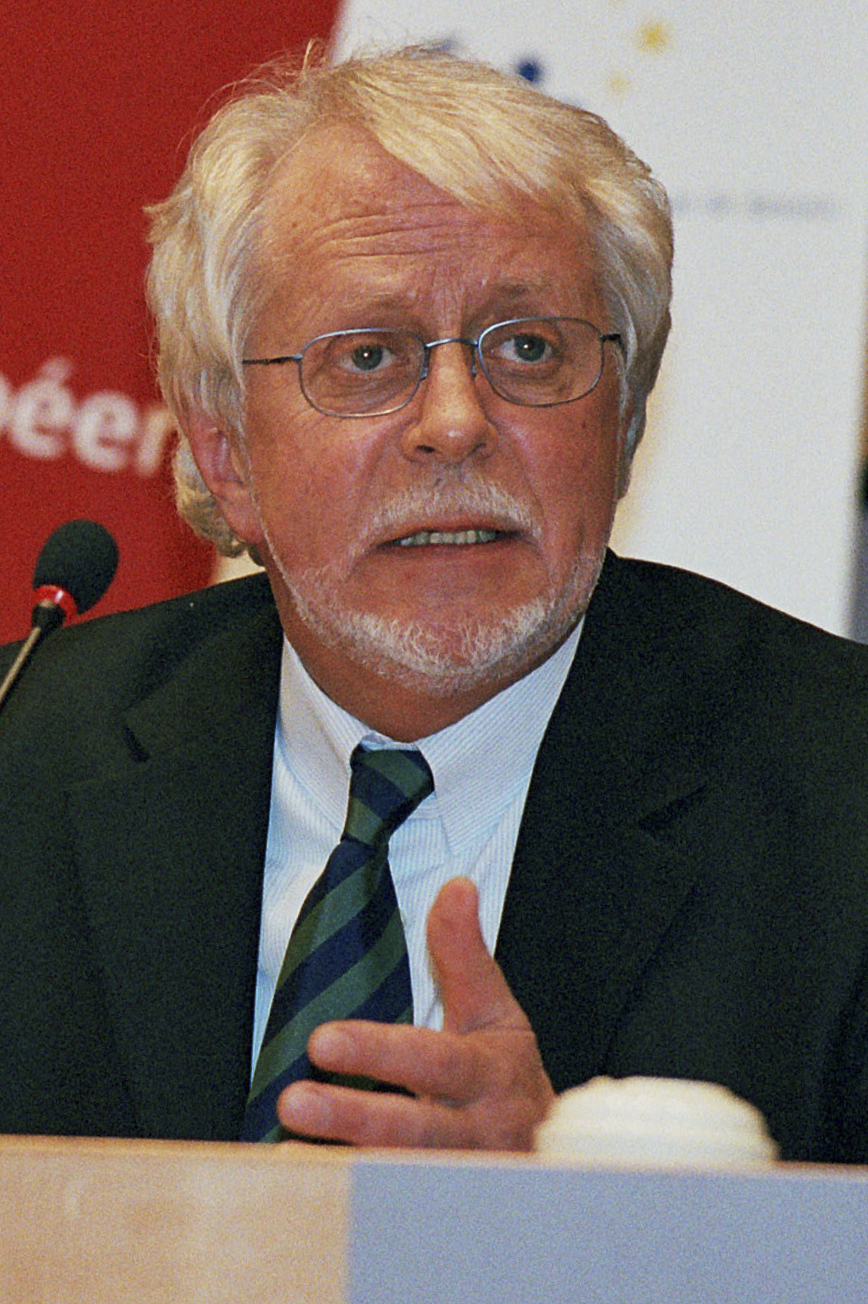
- Weiler in 2005

Marshal of the Grand Ducal Court
- In office 4 January 2016 – 1 June 2020
- Monarch: Henri
- Preceded by: Pierre Bley
- Succeeded by: Yuriko Backes

President of the Chamber of Deputies
- In office 3 August 2004 – 8 July 2009
- Vice President: Laurent Mosar; Jos Scheuer; Niki Bettendorf; Henri Grethen; Colette Flesch
- Preceded by: Jean Spautz
- Succeeded by: Laurent Mosar

Member of the Chamber of Deputies
- In office 16 July 1984 – 13 November 2013
- Constituency: North

Personal details
- Born: 3 August 1951 Ettelbruck, Luxembourg
- Died: 1 February 2026 (aged 74) Diekirch, Luxembourg
- Citizenship: Luxembourgish
- Party: CSV
- Children: Charel Weiler

Lucien Weiler (3 August 1951 – 1 February 2026) was a Luxembourgish politician and jurist. He was a member of the Christian Social People's Party, and served as President of the Chamber of Deputies from 3 August 2004 to 7 June 2009. He was first elected to the Chamber at the 1984 election, representing the Nord circonscription.

Weiler also sat on the communal council of Diekirch (1986–1993), during which time, he served as an échevin (1988–1993).

Weiler died on 1 February 2026, at the age of 74.

== Honours ==
- Portugal: Grand Cross of the Order of Merit (23 May 2017)

== Footnotes ==
Political offices
| Preceded by Jean Spautz | President of the Chamber of Deputies; 2004–2009 | Succeeded by Laurent Mosar |
