= 2018 Luxembourg general election =

- 14 October 2018
- All 60 seats in the Chamber of Deputies; 31 seats needed for a majority
- Turnout: 89.66% (▼1.49pp)
Party	Leader	Vote %	Seats	+/–
CSV	Claude Wiseler	28.31	21	−2
LSAP	Etienne Schneider	17.60	10	−3
DP	Xavier Bettel	16.91	12	−1
Greens	No spitzenkandidat	15.12	9	+3
ADR	Gast Gibéryen	8.28	4	+1
Pirates	Sven Clement	6.45	2	+2
The Left	No spitzenkandidat	5.48	2	0
This lists parties that won seats. See the complete results below.
Results by constituency and commune
Prime Minister before	Prime Minister after
Xavier Bettel; DP	Xavier Bettel; DP

General elections were held in Luxembourg on 14 October 2018. All 60 seats of the Chamber of Deputies were renewed.

The incumbent Bettel government was made up of a coalition of the Democratic Party (DP), the Luxembourg Socialist Workers' Party (LSAP) and The Greens. The largest party in Parliament, the Christian Social People's Party (CSV), was in the opposition.

The 2018 election saw a decline in vote share and seats for the three traditionally dominant parties — the CSV, LSAP and DP — at the benefit of smaller parties, particularly the Pirate Party, which entered parliament for the first time, and the Greens, which achieved their best ever electoral result with 9 seats. This latter performance allowed for Bettel's governing coalition to obtain a narrow majority of 31 seats and remain in place with minor changes in government composition, including the appointment of the Greens' Félix Braz as Deputy Prime Minister alongside Etienne Schneider.

== Date ==
There was some debate about when the election ought to be held. Article 56 of the Constitution of Luxembourg defines that deputies are elected for a five-year term, which would mean holding an election by October 2018, five years after the 20 October 2013 snap election. However, article 123 of the Electoral Law of 2003 states that "In case of dissolution of the Chamber, the end of tenure dates for deputies elected after the dissolution, will occur in the year following the opening of the fifth ordinary session." Since the fifth ordinary session would be opened in late 2018, the election would need to be held in 2019, likely concurrent with the June 2019 European Parliament elections, exceeding the constitutional five-year term. The electoral law was thus seen as conflicting with the constitution, and the politicians intended to amend the law and hold general elections in October 2018. The law modification of 15 December 2017 removes June as month for regular parliamentary elections and instead fixes the election date when the parliamentary term expires, meaning five years after the previous election.

== Electoral system ==
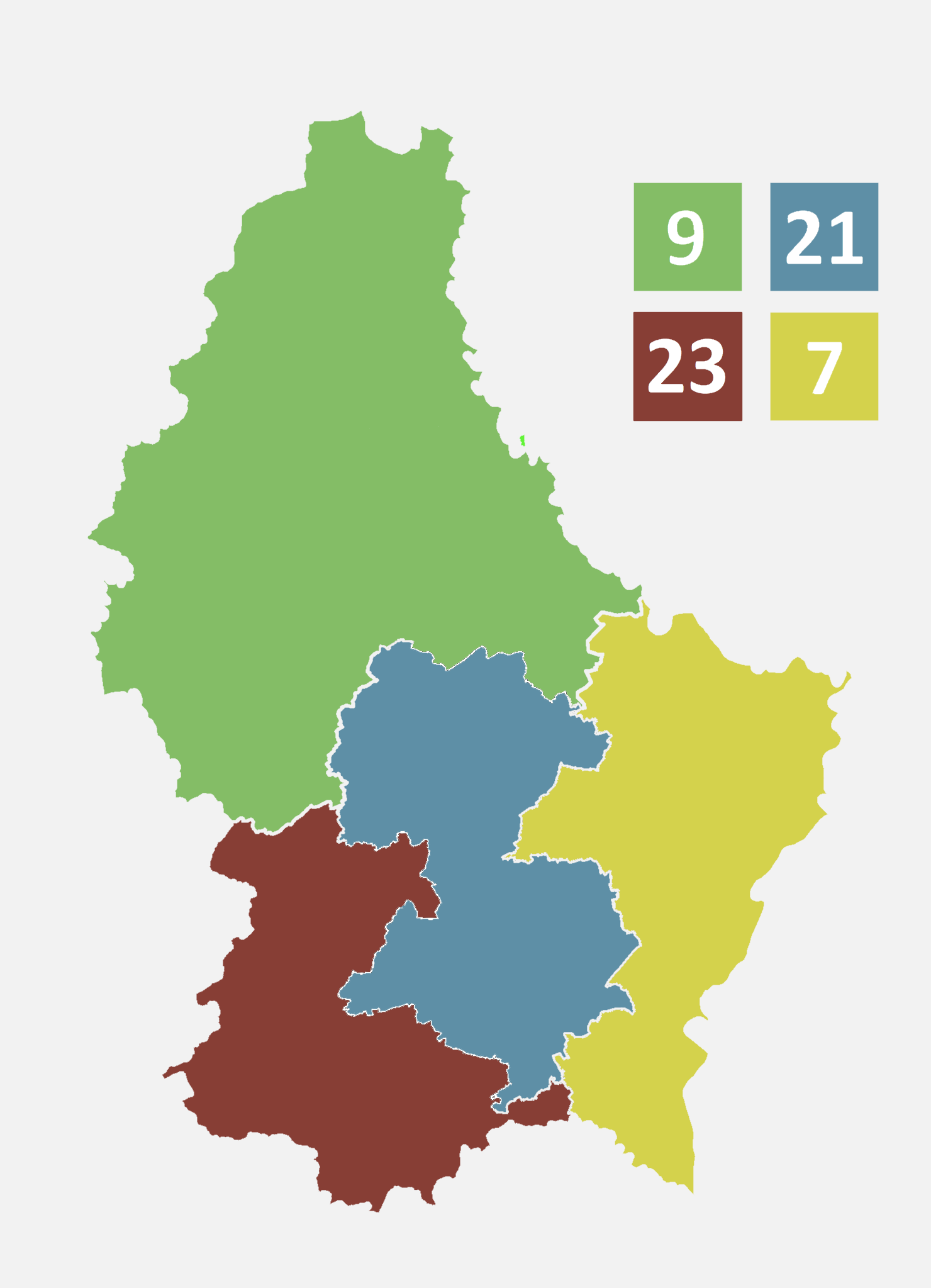
Map of Luxembourg's constituencies with number of seats

The 60 members of the Chamber of Deputies was elected by proportional representation in four multi-member constituencies; 9 in North constituency, 7 in East, 23 in South and 21 in Centre. Voters could vote for a party list or cast multiple votes for as many candidates as there are seats. Seat allocation is calculated in accordance with the Hagenbach-Bischoff quota.

Only Luxembourg citizens may vote in general elections. A proposal to extend voting rights to foreigners who have lived in Luxembourg for at least 10 years and have previously voted in a European or local election in Luxembourg, was decisively rejected in a 2015 referendum. Voting is mandatory for eligible Luxembourg citizens who live in Luxembourg and are under 75 years of age. Luxembourg citizens who live abroad may vote by post at the commune in which they most recently lived in Luxembourg. Luxembourg citizens who were born in Luxembourg but have never lived there may vote by post at the commune in which they were born. Luxembourg citizens who were not born in Luxembourg and have never lived there may vote by post at the commune of Luxembourg City.

== Campaign ==
On 2 March 2018, the Alternative Democratic Reform Party (ADR) announced an electoral alliance with the Wee 2050-Nee 2015 movement, which had formed itself as a citizen's movement fighting for the "3 x no" in the 2015 referendum. This agreement gives the movement up to eight slots on the ADR's lists.

== Opinion polls ==
=== Seat projections ===
Date	Source	CSV	LSAP	DP	DG	ADR	DL	KPL
Jun 2018	TNS	26	9	10	7	5	3	0
Dec 2017	TNS	27	10	10	6	4	3	0
May 2017	TNS	29	10	9	6	3	3	0
Dec 2016	TNS	28	10	10	6	3	3	0
Jun 2016	TNS	27	10	7	7	6	3	0
Jun 2016	Tageblatt	27	10	7	7	6	3	0
Jan 2016	TNS	27	10	8	6	5	3	1
20 Oct 2013	Election	23	13	13	6	3	2	0

== Parties ==
The following parties contested the election.

List No.	Name	Abbr.	Lead candidate	Ideology	Political position	Last election		Notes
List No.	Name	Abbr.	Lead candidate	Ideology	Political position	Votes (%)	Seats	Notes
1	Pirate Party Luxembourg; Piratepartei Lëtzebuerg	PPLU	Sven Clement	Pirate politics Direct democracy Copyright reform		2.94%	0 / 60	
2	The Greens; Déi Gréng	DG	François Bausch	Green politics Pro-Europeanism	Centre-left	10.13%	6 / 60	
3	Luxembourg Socialist Workers' Party; Lëtzebuerger Sozialistesch Aarbechterpartei	LSAP	Etienne Schneider	Social democracy	Centre-left	20.28%	13 / 60	
4	Christian Social People's Party; Chrëschtlech Sozial Vollekspartei	CSV	Claude Wiseler	Christian democracy Conservatism; Pro-Europeanism	Centre to centre-right	33.66%	23 / 60	
5	Communist Party of Luxembourg; Kommunistesch Partei vu Lëtzebuerg	KPL	Ali Ruckert	Communism; Marxism–Leninism; Hard Euroscepticism	Far-left	1.64%	0 / 60	
6	Democratic Party; Demokratesch Partei	DP	Xavier Bettel	Liberalism; Conservative liberalism Social liberalism	Centre to centre-right	18.27%	13 / 60	
7	Alternative Democratic Reform Party; Alternativ Demokratesch Reformpartei	ADR	Roy Reding	Conservatism; Right-wing populism National conservatism	Right-wing to far-right	6.64%	3 / 60	
8	The Left; Déi Lénk	DL	David Wagner	Democratic socialism Soft Euroscepticism	Left-wing	4.94%	2 / 60	
9	Democracy; Demokratie					Did not exist		Only presenting lists in the South and Centre constituencies
10	The Conservatives; Déi Konservativ		Joe Thein	Conservatism		Did not exist		Only presenting a list in the South constituency

== Results ==
Largest Party in each commune

Party	Raw results		Weighted results		Seats	+/–
Party	Votes	%	Votes	%	Seats	+/–
Christian Social People's Party	999,381	28.31	58,538	28.90	21	–2
Luxembourg Socialist Workers' Party	621,332	17.60	33,981	16.77	10	–3
Democratic Party	597,080	16.91	35,454	17.50	12	–1
The Greens	533,893	15.12	30,487	15.05	9	+3
Alternative Democratic Reform Party	292,388	8.28	17,336	8.56	4	+1
Pirate Party Luxembourg	227,549	6.45	13,394	6.61	2	+2
The Left	193,594	5.48	10,208	5.04	2	0
Communist Party of Luxembourg	44,916	1.27	2,311	1.14	0	0
Democracy	10,320	0.29	465	0.23	0	New
The Conservatives	9,516	0.27	414	0.20	0	New
Total	3,529,969	100.00	202,588	100.00	60	0
Valid votes	216,177	92.77				
Invalid/blank votes	16,837	7.23				
Total votes	233,014	100.00				
Registered voters/turnout	259,887	89.66				
Source: Government of Luxembourg

== Aftermath ==
On 16 October Grand Duke Henri gave Xavier Bettel the task of forming the next government, with the DP, LSAP and DG announcing that they would participate in coalition talks. On 17 October coalition negotiations started between the three parties, with an agreement due to be finished before Christmas. It was expected that the LSAP would take the EU Commission post in the next government, while the DG would increase their influence on ministries. The coalition was confirmed and Bettel was reappointed Prime Minister on 5 December 2018.
