= Pirate Party Luxembourg =

Pirate Party Luxembourg Piratepartei Lëtzebuerg
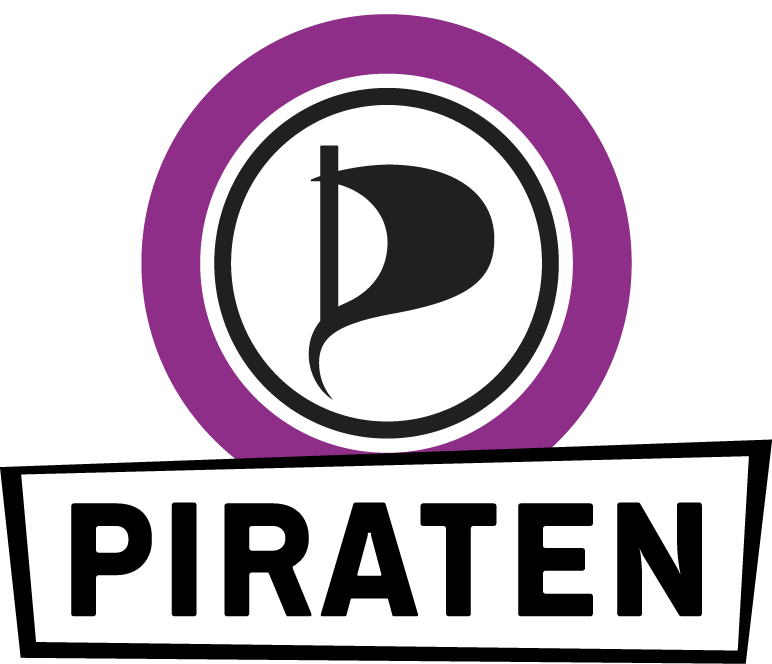
- Spokesperson: Starsky Flor; Rebecca Lau
- Founded: 4 October 2009
- Headquarters: 1a, rue de Luxembourg; L-8184 Kopstal (Koplescht)
- Membership: 420
- Ideology: Pirate politics Direct democracy Copyright reform Government transparency
- Political position: Syncretic
- International affiliation: Pirate Parties International
- European political alliance: European Pirate Party
- Colours: Purple, white, black
- Chamber of Deputies: 2 / 60
- European Parliament: 0 / 6
- Local councils: 13 / 722

Website
- piratepartei.lu

The Pirate Party Luxembourg (Luxembourgish: Piratepartei Lëtzebuerg; German: Piratenpartei Luxemburg; French: Parti pirate du Luxembourg) is a registered political party in Luxembourg. The party follows the pirate political doctrine developed by the Swedish Pirate Party. It champions citizen's rights, improved data protection and privacy for physical persons, more transparency of government, free access to information and education. Beyond this, it calls for an in-depth overhaul of copyright and patent law, and opposes every form of censorship. A fundamental principle is grassroots democracy, which gives the possibility to each member to help shape the future of the party. Like most parties in Luxembourg, the Pirate Party is vigorously pro-European. It is a member of Pirate Parties International, the umbrella organisation of the international Pirate Party movement.

The Pirate Party Luxembourg was founded in Luxembourg City on 4 October 2009. Its membership evolved from 14 founding members to 331 by April 2014.

From 2009 to 2018, Sven Clement was the President and the main candidate for the general elections in 2013 and the European elections in 2014. The vice-president was Sven Wohl, the treasurer was Ben Allard and the general secretary was Andy Maar. Another prominent figure was Jerry Weyer, former vice-president and co-founder of the party who was also co-president of Pirate Parties International (PPI) from March 2010 to 2011. The current co-speakers of the party are Starsky Flor and Rebecca Lau.

== Gallery ==
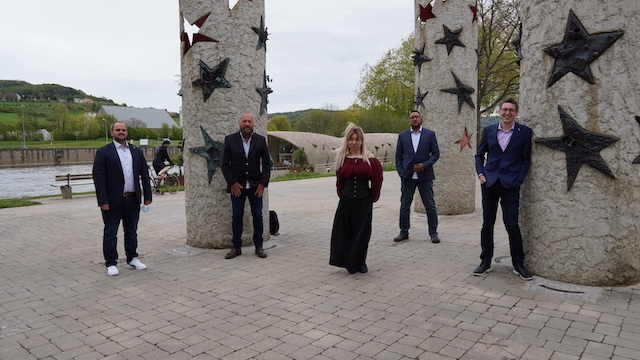
2021 party congress

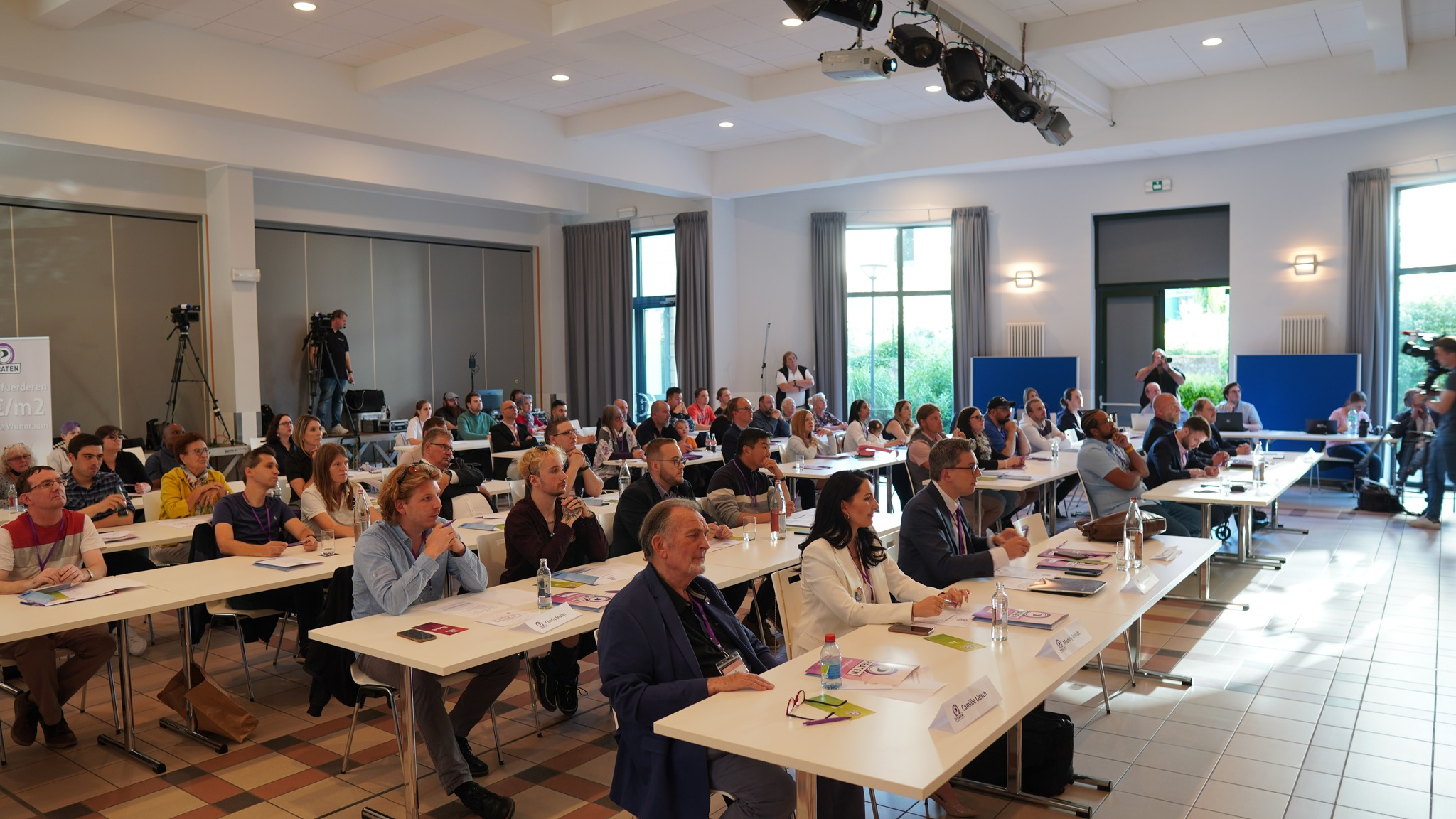
2022 party congress

== Election results ==
In the 2023 general election, the party achieved its highest results in the North, with its lead candidate there, Ben Polidori, being elected.

=== Chamber of Deputies ===
Election	Votes	%	Seats	+/–	Government
2013	96,270	2.94 (#7)	0 / 60	New	Extra-parliamentary
2018	227,549	6.45 (#6)	2 / 60	▲2	Opposition
2023	253,554	6.74 (#6)	3 / 60	▲1	Opposition

=== European Parliament ===
Election	List leader	Votes	%	Seats	+/–	EP Group
2014	Sven Clement	49,553	4.23 (#7)	0 / 6	New	–
2019	Daniel Frères	96,579	7.70 (#6)	0 / 6	0	–
2024	Raymond Remakel	68,085	4.92 (#6)	0 / 6	0	–
