= 2013 Luxembourg general election =

- 20 October 2013
- All 60 seats in the Chamber of Deputies; 31 seats needed for a majority
- Turnout: 91.15% (▲0.22 pp)
Party	Leader	Vote %	Seats	+/–
CSV	Jean-Claude Juncker	33.68	23	−3
LSAP	Etienne Schneider	20.28	13	0
DP	Xavier Bettel	18.25	13	+4
Greens	No spitzenkandidat	10.13	6	−1
ADR	Gast Gibéryen; Fernand Kartheiser	6.64	3	−1
The Left	No spitzenkandidat	4.94	2	+1
This lists parties that won seats. See the complete results below.
Results by commune and constituency
Prime Minister before	Prime Minister after
Jean-Claude Juncker; CSV	Xavier Bettel; DP

Early general elections were held in Luxembourg on 20 October 2013. The elections were called after Prime Minister Jean-Claude Juncker, at the time the longest-serving head of government in the European Union, announced his resignation over a spy scandal involving the Service de Renseignement de l'État (SREL). The review found Juncker deficient in his control over the service.

Although the elections saw Juncker's Christian Social People's Party (CSV) lose three seats, but remain the largest party in the Chamber of Deputies with 23 of the 60 seats, Xavier Bettel of the Democratic Party (DP) succeeded him as Prime Minister.

== Background ==
After a spy scandal involving the Service de Renseignement de l'État illegally wiretapping politicians, the Grand Duke and his family, as well as allegations of paying for favours in exchange for access to government ministers and officials leaked through the press, Prime Minister Juncker submitted his resignation to the Grand Duke on 11 July 2013, upon knowledge of the withdrawal of the Luxembourg Socialist Workers' Party from the government and thereby losing its confidence and supply in the Chamber of Deputies. Juncker urged the Grand Duke for the immediate dissolution of parliament and the calling of a snap election.

== Electoral system ==
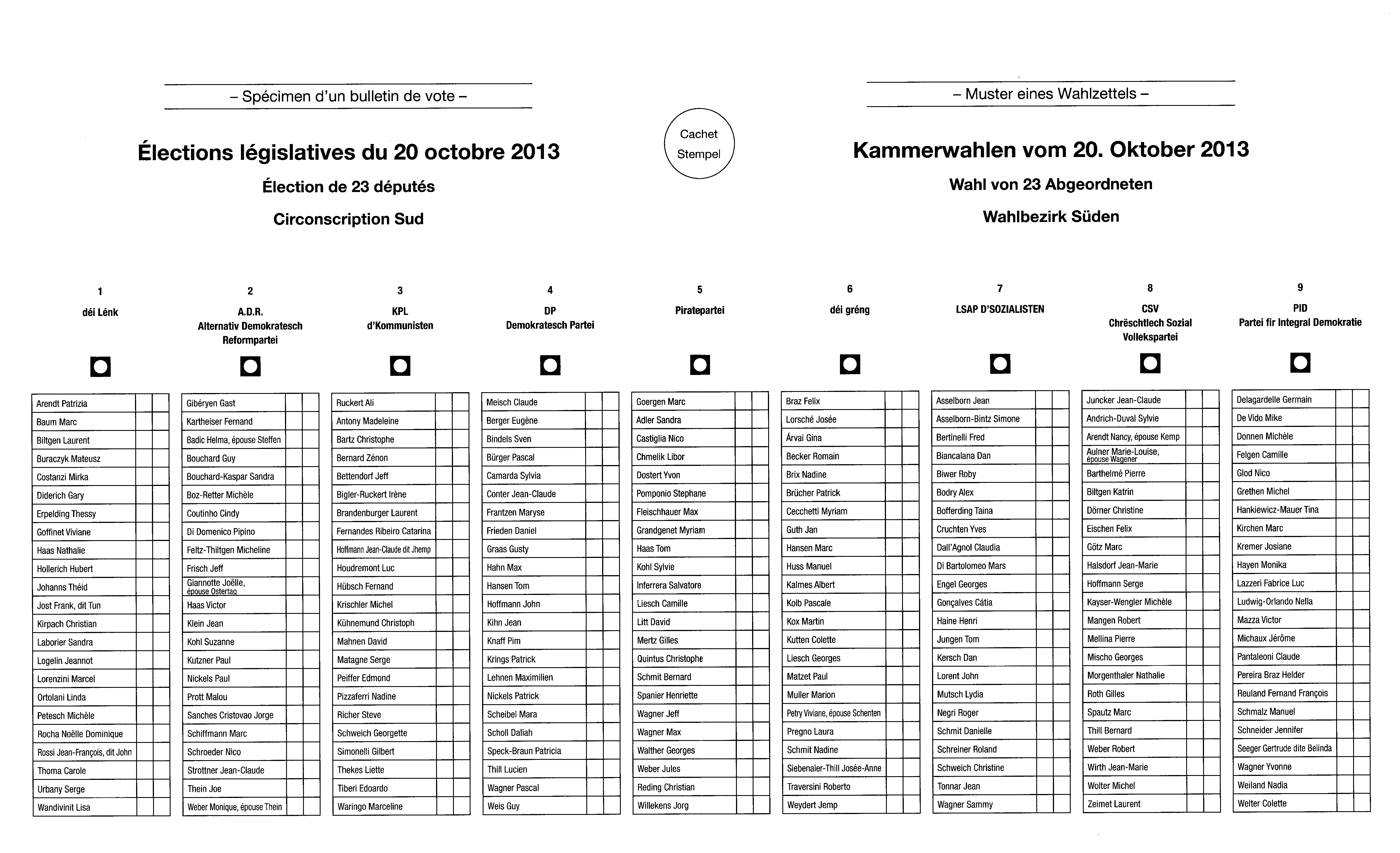
Sample ballot of the Sud constituency

The 60 members of the Chamber of Deputies were elected by proportional representation in four multi-member constituencies; 9 in North constituency, 7 in East, 23 in South and 21 in Centre. Voters could vote for a party list or cast multiple votes for as many candidates as there were seats. Seat allocation was calculated in accordance with the Hagenbach-Bischoff quota.

Voting was compulsory for all citizens between the age of 18 and 75, whilst those over 75 and citizens living abroad were the only ones allowed to vote by post. Failure to vote could have resulted in a fine of between €100 and €250.

== Parties ==
Nine parties contested the election, of which five won seats in the Chamber of Deputies at the last election: the Christian Social People's Party (CSV), the Luxembourg Socialist Workers' Party (LSAP), the Democratic Party (DP), the Greens, the Alternative Democratic Reform Party (ADR), and The Left. Two extra-parliamentary parties also ran: the Communist Party (KPL) and Pirate Party Luxembourg (PPLU). In addition, the Party for Full Democracy (PID), which was headed by independent deputy Jean Colombera, also contested the election. All parties that ran in the election submitted lists in all constituencies.

List #	Party	Running in				Seats	
List #	Party	Centre	East	North	South	2009	Pre-election
1	The Left					1	1
2	Alternative Democratic Reform Party (ADR)					4	3
3	Communist Party (KPL)					0	0
4	Democratic Party (DP)					9	9
5	Pirate Party Luxembourg (PPLU)					0	0
6	Greens					7	7
7	Luxembourg Socialist Workers' Party (LSAP)					13	13
8	Christian Social People's Party (CSV)					26	26
9	Party for Full Democracy (PID)					0	1

== Opinion polls ==
Published	Company	CSV	LSAP	DP	The Greens	ADR	The Left	KP	Piraten
27.08-13.09.2013	TNS	33%	15%	15%	10%	1%	4%	1%	1%
2009 elections		38.0%	21.5%	15.0%	11.7%	8.1%	3.3%	1.4%	

=== Seat projections ===
Publication date	Source	CSV	LSAP	DP	DG	ADR	DL
15 June 2013	TNS	23	11	11	8	4	3
8 Dec 2012	TNS	24/25	12	11/12	8	2	2
9 June 2012	TNS	23	14	9	8	4	2
10 Dec 2011	TNS	23	13	9	10	3	2
10 June 2011	TNS	24	11	9	9	5	2
11 Dec 2010	TNS	25	12	10	8	3	2
12 June 2010	TNS	26	13	9	7	4	1
12 Dec 2009	TNS	26	13	9	7	4	1
7 June 2009	Election	26	13	9	7	4	1

== Results ==
Party	Raw results		Weighted results (Note: Calculated separately for each constituency (rounded to the nearest whole number) using the formula: $$\mbox{party's} \; \mbox{votes} \times \frac{\mbox{total} \; \mbox{of} \; \mbox{valid} \; \mbox{ballots}}{\mbox{total} \; \mbox{of} \; \mbox{valid} \; \mbox{votes}}$$)		Seats	+/–
Party	Votes	%	Votes	%	Seats	+/–
Christian Social People's Party	1,103,636	33.68	69,253	34.02	23	–3
Luxembourg Socialist Workers' Party	664,586	20.28	39,291	19.30	13	0
Democratic Party	597,879	18.25	38,669	19.00	13	+4
The Greens	331,920	10.13	20,966	10.30	6	–1
Alternative Democratic Reform Party	217,683	6.64	13,799	6.78	3	–1
The Left	161,759	4.94	9,156	4.50	2	+1
Pirate Party Luxembourg	96,270	2.94	6,020	2.96	0	New
Communist Party of Luxembourg	53,669	1.64	2,958	1.45	0	0
Party for Full Democracy	49,290	1.50	3,445	1.69	0	New
Total	3,276,692	100.00	203,557	100.00	60	0
Valid votes	203,557	93.18				
Invalid/blank votes	14,896	6.82				
Total votes	218,453	100.00				
Registered voters/turnout	239,668	91.15				
Source: Elections in Luxembourg, IFES

=== By locality ===
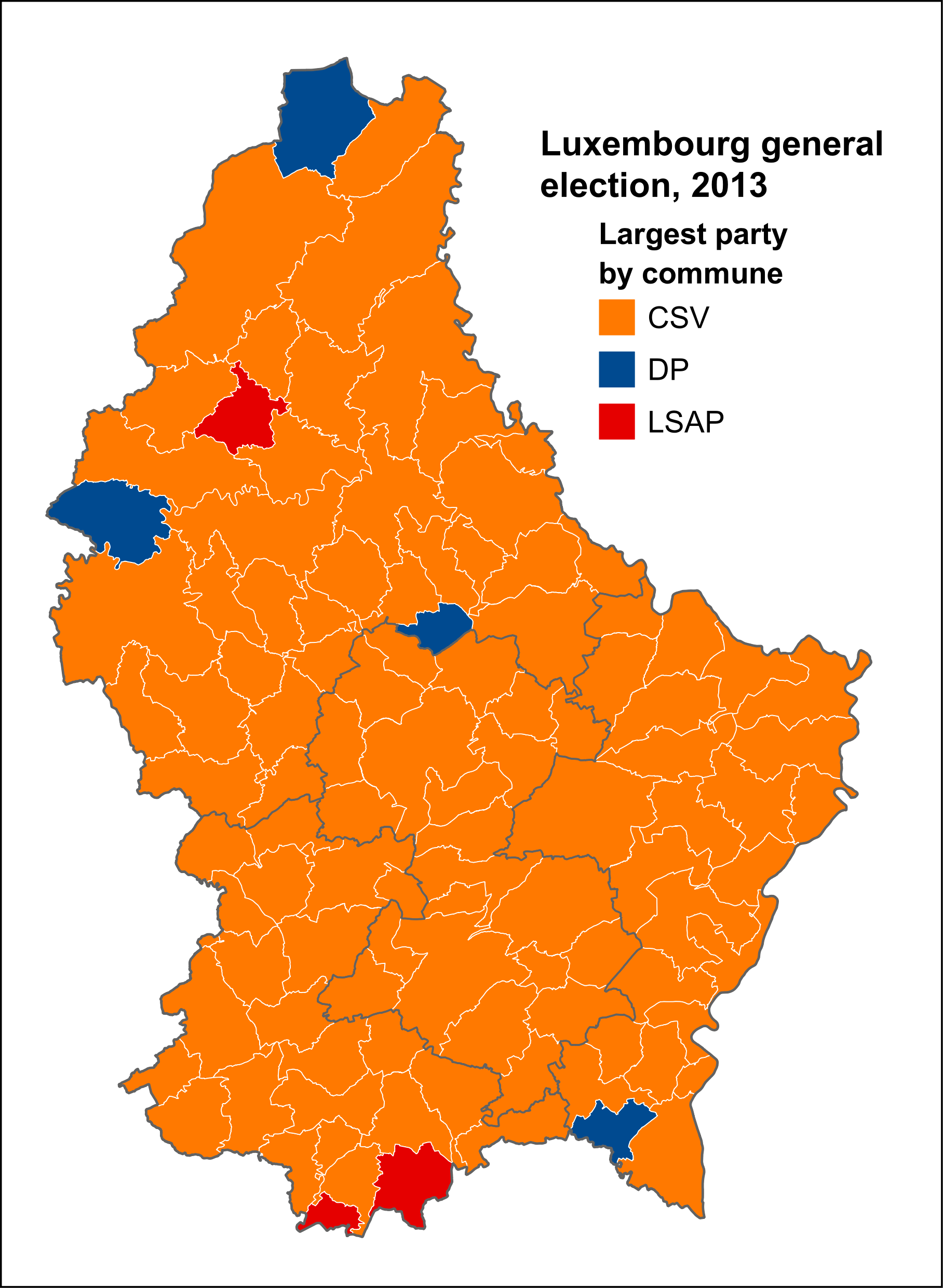
The CSV was the largest party in almost every commune (in orange) — as in all elections since the CSV was founded. The DP was the largest in four (in blue) and the LSAP the biggest in three (red). CSV DP LSAP

As in 2004 and 2009, the CSV won pluralities in each of Luxembourg's four constituencies. However, the CSV's performance declined in all constituencies from 2009. The CSV held up the best in Centre, where it lost only 3.29% compared to its 2009 result. The CSV's sharpest decline was in North, where the party lost 5.91%. It nonetheless held a 10% lead over DP in North; North was the last constituency to not vote for the CSV at the national level, when the DP beat the CSV by 2% in North in 1999. Overall, despite a relative decline, the CSV retained a comfortable lead in all constituencies, both in votes and in seats.

=== Votes by constituency ===
Constituency	CSV		LSAP		DP		Gréng		ADR		Lénk		PPL		KPL		PID	
Centre	385390	35.31	159905	14.65	273069	25.02	114145	10.46	54709	5.01	51851	4.75	9425	0.86	29633	2.72	13318	1.22
East	71786	36.90	28386	14.59	36237	18.63	25486	13.10	16901	8.69	5941	3.05	1537	0.79	5226	2.69	3018	1.55
North	107163	33.69	54788	17.22	75426	23.71	28646	9.01	20246	6.36	8138	2.56	2575	0.81	10733	3.37	10384	3.26
South	539297	32.20	421507	25.23	213147	12.76	163643	10.13	125827	7.55	95829	5.70	40132	2.39	50678	3.03	22570	1.35

=== Seats by constituency ===
Constituency	Total seats	Seats won					
Constituency	Total seats	CSV	LSAP	DP	Gréng	ADR	Lénk
Centre	21	8	3	6	2	1	1
East	7	3	1	2	1		
North	9	4	2	2	1		
South	23	8	7	3	2	2	1

== Government formation ==
Following the elections, the Democratic Party, the Socialist Workers' Party and The Greens began initial talks about forming a coalition (dubbed the "Gambia coalition", after Gambia's flag colours, a local variant of the German traffic light coalition), pushing the Christian Social People's Party into the opposition for the first time since 1979. On 25 October, Xavier Bettel, the leader of the Democratic Party and mayor of Luxembourg City, was named formateur by the Grand Duke of Luxembourg. The negotiations were finished by 29 November, as planned.

The new Bettel–Schneider Ministry was sworn in on 4 December. It succeeded the Juncker–Asselborn Ministry II.
