= Peppange =

Town in Roeser, Luxembourg

Coordinates: 49°31′N 6°08′E

Peppange (French pronunciation: [pɛpɑ̃ʒ]; Luxembourgish: Peppeng; German: Peppingen [ˈpɛpɪŋən]) is a small town in the commune of Roeser, in southern Luxembourg. As of September 2026, the town has a population of 956. It has a Benedictine convent which is still active (rue St. Benoit), as well as a parish church.
