= Fernand Etgen =

Luxembourgish politician (born 1957)

The Honourable Fernand Etgen
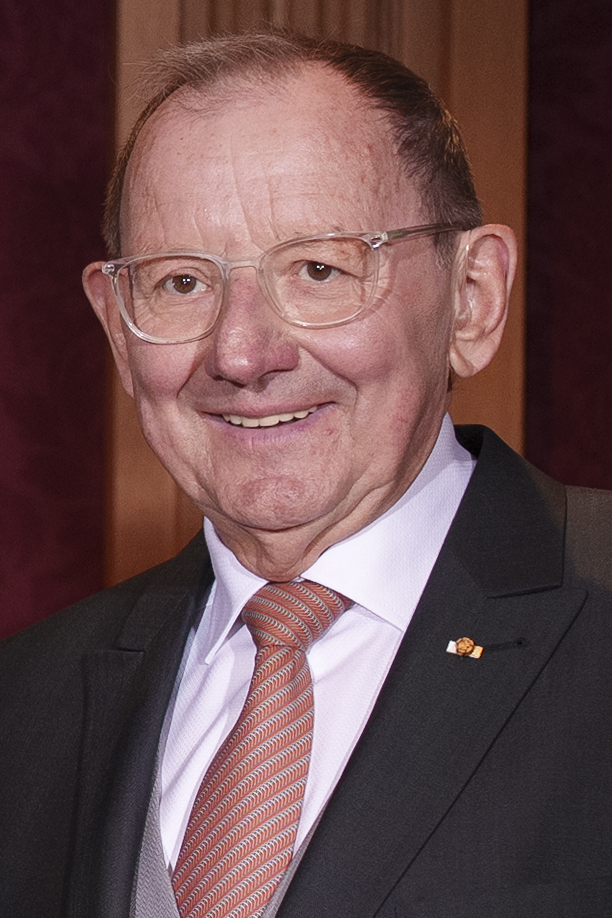
- Etgen in 2025

Member of the Chamber of Deputies of Luxembourg
- In office 30 October 2018 – 18 December 2025
- Succeeded by: Marc Hansen
- Constituency: North
- In office 20 December 2007 – 6 October 2013
- Preceded by: Emile Calmes
- Constituency: North

President of the Chamber of Deputies of Luxembourg
- In office 6 December 2018 – 24 October 2023
- Monarch: Henri
- Preceded by: Mars Di Bartolomeo
- Succeeded by: Claude Wiseler

Minister for Agriculture, Viticulture and the Protection of consumers Minister for Parliament relations
- In office 4 December 2013 – 5 December 2018
- Preceded by: Nicolas Schmit (Agriculture & Viticulture)
- Succeeded by: Romain Schneider (Agriculture & Viticulture); Paulette Lenert (Consumer Protection); Marc Hansen (Relations with Parliament)

Personal details
- Born: 10 March 1957 (age 69) Ettelbruck, Luxembourg
- Party: Democratic Party
- Nickname: Den Tiger

Fernand Etgen (Luxembourgish pronunciation: [ˈfæʁnɑ̃ːˈətʒən]; born 10 March 1957) is a Luxembourgish politician of the Democratic Party (DP) who served as the President of the Chamber of Deputies from 2018 to 2023. A member of the Chamber of Deputies from 2007 to 2013 and from 2018 to 2025, he also served as Minister for Agriculture, Consumer Protection and Relations with Parliament from 2013 to 2018, and as mayor of Feulen from 1994 to 2013.

== Biography ==
=== Studies and formation ===
Etgen completed his secondary school studies at the Lycée classique of Diekirch from 1971 to 1977. During his studies, he earned the nickname "den Tiger" for his at times mischievous behaviour.

=== Professional life ===
Aside from his political career, Etgen was a civil servant working for the Registration Duties, Estates and VAT Authority.

=== Political life ===
Following the 2013 general election, Etgen entered the government as Minister for Agriculture, Viticulture and the Protection of consumers, as well as Minister for Parliament relations on 4 December 2013 within the coalition government between the Democratic Party (DP), Luxembourgish Socialist Worker's Party (LSAP) and the Greens (déi gréng).

=== Other political functions ===
Joining the DP in 1979, Etgen became a member of the communal council of Feulen from 1979 to 1981 and from 1988 to 1993, and an alderman from 1982 to 1987. In 1994, he became mayor, a function he occupied until he joined the government on 4 December 2013.

At the national level, Etgen joined the Chamber of Deputies in 2007. There, he occupied, among others, the functions of vice president of the commission for Public function and Administrative reform, of Media and Communication et of the commission for Public works. He was elected to the Chamber of Deputies on the DP's list in the North constituency in 2009. He was vice president of the commission for Internal Affairs, of the Greater Region and of Police, of the commission for Agriculture, Viticulture and Rural development as well as of the commission for Public function and Administrative simplification from 2009 to 2013.

Etgen was the DP's general secretary from 2010 to 2014.

== Honours ==
- Grand Cordon of the Order of the Rising Sun (2026)

Political offices
Preceded by Mars Di Bartolomeo	President of the Chamber of Deputies; 2018-2023	Succeeded by Claude Wiseler
