= Romain Schneider =

Luxembourgish politician

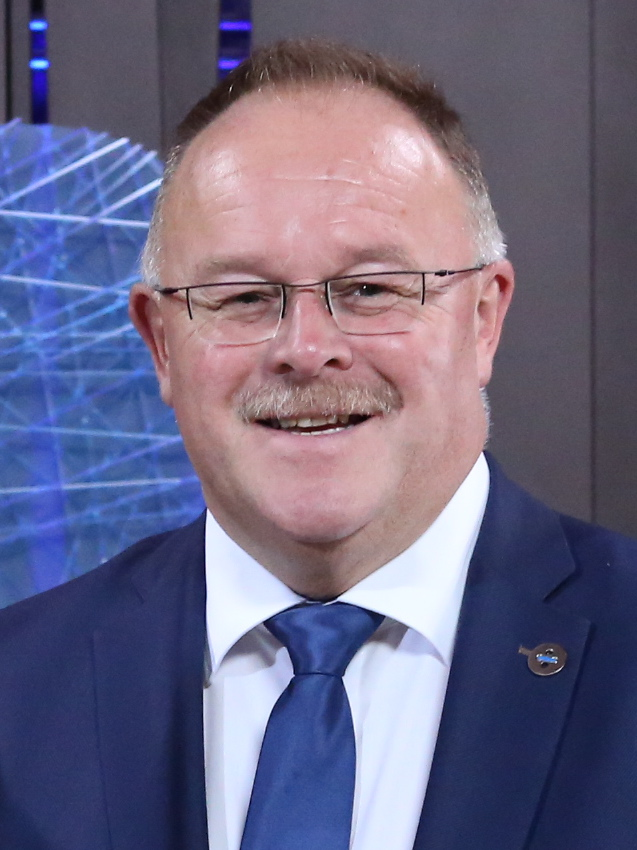
Schneider in 2017

Romain Philippe Joseph Schneider (Luxembourgish pronunciation: [ˈʀomɛ̃ː ˈʃnɑɪ̯dɐ]; born 15 April 1962 in Wiltz) is a Luxembourgish politician of the Luxembourg Socialist Workers' Party (LSAP). He served under successive governments from 2009 to 2022, including as Minister for Agriculture (2009-2013; 2018-2022), Sports (2009-2018) and Social Security (2013-2018).

Schneider was previously a member of the national legislature, the Chamber of Deputies, representing the North constituency from 2004 to 2009.

He was first elected as a communal councillor in Wiltz in 1993, serving as the town's mayor from 2000 to 2009, when he joined the government.

Schneider is the former President of the football club FC Wiltz 71. He has been the Secretary-General of the LSAP since 25 October 2004, having first joined the party in 1981.
