= Ali Kaes =

Luxembourgish politician

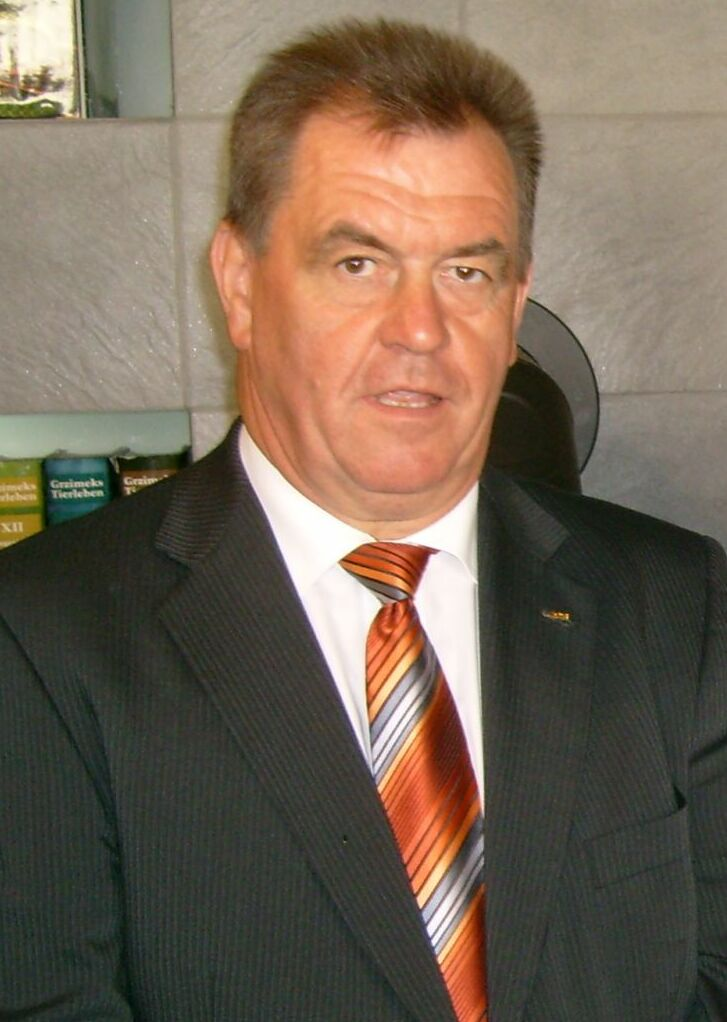
Ali Kaes

Ali Kaes (born 4 April 1955, in Diekirch) is a Luxembourgish politician for the Christian Social People's Party. He was a member of the national legislature, the Chamber of Deputies, representing the Nord constituency from 2004 to 2023.

He was also mayor of Tandel, being the commune's first mayor at its creation on 1 January 2006 and serving until 2023. Kaes was previously the mayor of Bastendorf, one of the two communes that merged to form Tandel, having held that position since 1 January 1994. Prior to that, he had been a councillor in Bastendorf (1989–1993).

== Footnotes ==
Political offices
New title Commune created	Mayor of Tandel; 2006 – present day	Incumbent
