= North (Chamber of Deputies of Luxembourg constituency) =

Constituency of the Chamber of Deputies, the national legislature of Luxembourg

- Norden; Nord; Norden
- Constituency for the Chamber of Deputies
- Location of North within Luxembourg
- Canton: List: Clervaux; Diekirch; Redange; Vianden; Wiltz
- Population: 103,326 (2024)
- Electorate: 52,922 (2023)
- Area: 1,157 km^{2} (2018)

Current Constituency
- Created: 1919
- Seats: List: 9 (1964–present); 10 (1945–1964); 11 (1925–1945); 12 (1919–1925)
- Deputies: List: André Bauler (DP); Jeff Boonen (CSV); Emile Eicher (CSV); Jeff Engelen (ADR); Fernand Etgen (DP); Claude Haagen (LSAP); Christophe Hansen (CSV); Ben Polidori (LSAP); Charel Weiler (CSV)
- Created from: List: Clervaux; Diekirch; Redange; Vianden; Wiltz

North (Luxembourgish: Norden; French: Nord; German: Norden) is one of the four multi-member constituencies of the Chamber of Deputies, the national legislature of Luxembourg. The constituency was established in 1919 following the introduction of proportional representation for elections to the Chamber of Deputies. It consists of the cantons of Clervaux, Diekirch, Redange, Vianden and Wiltz. The constituency currently elects nine of the 60 members of the Chamber of Deputies using the open party-list proportional representation electoral system. At the 2023 general election it had 52,922 registered electors.

== Electoral system ==
North currently elects nine of the 60 members of the Chamber of Deputies using the open party-list proportional representation electoral system. Electors votes for candidates rather than parties and may cast as many votes as the number of deputies to be elected from the constituency. They may vote for an entire party list or individual candidates and may cast up to two votes for an individual candidate. If the party list contains fewer candidates than the number of deputies to be elected, the elector may vote for candidates from other lists as long as their total number of votes does not exceed the number of deputies to be elected. The ballot paper is invalidated if the elector cast more votes than the number of deputies to be elected from the constituency. Split-ticket voting (panachage) is permitted.

The votes received by each party's candidates are aggregated and seats are allocated to each party using the Hagenbach-Bischoff quota.

== Election results ==
=== Summary ===
Election	Communists KPL / ABP			Left DL / NL / RSP / LCR			Socialist Workers LSAP / LAP / SP			Greens DG / GLEI-GAP / GAP			Democrats DP / GD / GPD / LP / FDP			Christian Social People CSV / RP			Alternative Democratic Reform ADR / 5/6		
Election	Votes	%	Seats	Votes	%	Seats	Votes	%	Seats	Votes	%	Seats	Votes	%	Seats	Votes	%	Seats	Votes	%	Seats
2023				9,758	2.59%	0	57,693	15.29%	1	25,193	6.68%	0	66,110	17.52%	2	124,965	33.11%	4	45,422	12.04%	1
2018	2,734	0.79%	0	12,164	3.53%	0	54,682	15.87%	1	44,728	12.98%	1	59,039	17.13%	2	111,067	32.23%	4	33,751	9.79%	1
2013	2,575	0.81%	0	8,138	2.56%	0	54,788	17.22%	2	28,646	9.01%	1	75,426	23.71%	2	107,163	33.69%	4	20,246	6.36%	0
2009	2,834	0.98%	0	5,785	2.00%	0	50,408	17.41%	1	31,213	10.78%	1	52,653	18.18%	2	114,658	39.60%	4	29,710	10.26%	1
2004				3,725	1.34%	0	43,812	15.78%	1	30,186	10.88%	1	56,253	20.27%	2	100,665	36.27%	4	40,991	14.77%	1
1999				3,653	1.42%	0	42,625	16.52%	1	23,640	9.16%	1	62,371	24.17%	2	80,642	31.25%	3	43,147	16.72%	2
1994	1,918	0.76%	0				48,003	19.01%	2	21,260	8.42%	1	57,484	22.76%	2	83,935	33.24%	3	35,249	13.96%	1
1989	3,626	1.47%	0				48,900	19.84%	2				55,760	22.62%	2	92,769	37.64%	4	24,773	10.05%	1
1984	3,709	1.55%	0				58,673	24.57%	2				62,510	26.18%	2	109,270	45.76%	5			
1979	3,639	1.52%	0				40,865	17.11%	1				47,631	19.95%	2	106,600	44.64%	5			
1974	6,876	2.85%	0	889	0.37%	0	49,680	20.59%	2				54,890	22.75%	2	98,176	40.68%	4			
1968	9,049	4.08%	0				66,626	30.07%	3				42,409	19.14%	2	102,805	46.40%	4			
1964	5,947	2.53%	0				77,874	33.14%	3				36,533	15.55%	1	107,098	45.58%	5			
1959							81,028	28.78%	3				66,913	23.77%	2	133,560	47.45%	5			
1954	4,365	1.50%	0				72,577	24.88%	2				37,621	12.90%	1	177,087	60.72%	7			
1951	5,049	1.72%	0				70,537	24.09%	2				66,375	22.67%	2	150,866	51.52%	6			
1945	8,869	3.00%	0				48,241	16.30%	1				58,368	19.72%	2	180,478	60.98%	7			
1937							52,599	16.55%	2				27,621	8.69%	1	185,620	58.42%	7			
1931							37,923	13.02%	1				35,702	12.26%	1	163,508	56.13%	7			
1925							27,498	9.46%	1							154,347	53.12%	6			
1922							24,879	8.33%	1							176,670	59.12%	7			
1919							29,546	9.04%	1							211,159	64.58%	8			

=== Detailed ===
==== 2020s ====
===== 2023 =====
Results of the 2023 general election held on 8 October 2023:

Party		Votes	%	Seats
Christian Social People's Party	CSV	124,965	33.11%	4
Democratic Party	DP	66,110	17.52%	2
Luxembourg Socialist Workers' Party	LSAP	57,693	15.29%	1
Alternative Democratic Reform Party	ADR	45,422	12.04%	1
Pirate Party Luxembourg	PPLU	29,110	7.71%	1
The Greens	DG	25,193	6.68%	0
Focus	FOK	11,858	3.14%	0
The Left	DL	9,758	2.59%	0
Liberty – Freedom!	LF	5,925	1.57%	0
The Conservatives	DK	1,370	0.36%	0
Total		377,404	100.00%	9
Valid votes		43,913		
Blank votes		1,681	3.54%	
Rejected votes – other		1,889	3.98%	
Total polled		47,483	89.72%	
Registered electors		52,922		

The following candidates were elected: André Bauler (DP), 9,943 votes; Emile Eicher (CSV), 13,296 votes; Jeff Engelen (ADR), 8,176 votes; Fernand Etgen (DP), 10,529 votes; Claude Haagen (LSAP), 9,076 votes; Christophe Hansen (CSV), 17,468 votes; Martine Hansen (CSV), 20,260 votes; Ben Polidori (PPLU), 4,804 votes; and Charel Weiler (CSV), 14,483 votes.

In September 2024, Ben Polidori defected from the PPL, joining the LSAP.

==== 2010s ====
===== 2018 =====
Results of the 2018 general election held on 14 October 2018:

Party		Votes	%	Seats
Christian Social People's Party	CSV	111,067	32.23%	4
Democratic Party	DP	59,039	17.13%	2
Luxembourg Socialist Workers' Party	LSAP	54,682	15.87%	1
The Greens	DG	44,728	12.98%	1
Alternative Democratic Reform Party	ADR	33,751	9.79%	1
Pirate Party Luxembourg	PPLU	26,421	7.67%	0
The Left	DL	12,164	3.53%	0
Communist Party of Luxembourg	KPL	2,734	0.79%	0
Total		344,586	100.00%	9
Valid votes		40,292		
Blank votes		1,335	3.08%	
Rejected votes – other		1,766	4.07%	
Total polled		43,393	91.89%	
Registered electors		47,223		

The following candidates were elected: André Bauler (DP), 9,227 votes; Emile Eicher (CSV), 12,956 votes; Jeff Engelen (ADR), 6,094 votes; Fernand Etgen (DP), 9,819 votes; Martine Hansen (CSV), 20,249 votes; Ali Kaes (CSV), 12,198 votes; Marco Schank (CSV), 14,096 votes; Romain Schneider (LSAP), 12,306 votes; and Claude Turmes (DG), 11,243 votes.

===== 2013 =====
Results of the 2013 general election held on 20 October 2013:

Party		Votes	%	Seats
Christian Social People's Party	CSV	107,163	33.69%	4
Democratic Party	DP	75,426	23.71%	2
Luxembourg Socialist Workers' Party	LSAP	54,788	17.22%	2
The Greens	DG	28,646	9.01%	1
Alternative Democratic Reform Party	ADR	20,246	6.36%	0
Pirate Party Luxembourg	PPLU	10,733	3.37%	0
Party for Full Democracy	PID	10,384	3.26%	0
The Left	DL	8,138	2.56%	0
Communist Party of Luxembourg	KPL	2,575	0.81%	0
Total		318,099	100.00%	9
Valid votes		37,210		
Blank votes		1,165	2.92%	
Rejected votes – other		1,542	3.86%	
Total polled		39,917	92.40%	
Registered electors		43,198		

The following candidates were elected: André Bauler (DP), 10,933 votes; Emile Eicher (CSV), 13,083 votes; Camille Gira (DG), 7,548 votes; Charles Goerens (DP), 17,523 votes; Claude Haagen (LSAP), 7,225 votes; Martine Hansen (CSV), 16,838 votes; Ali Kaes (CSV), 12,702 votes; Marco Schank (CSV), 17,174 votes; and Romain Schneider (LSAP), 12,389 votes.

==== 2000s ====
===== 2009 =====
Results of the 2009 general election held on 7 June 2009:

Party		Votes	%	Seats
Christian Social People's Party	CSV	114,658	39.60%	4
Democratic Party	DP	52,653	18.18%	2
Luxembourg Socialist Workers' Party	LSAP	50,408	17.41%	1
The Greens	DG	31,213	10.78%	1
Alternative Democratic Reform Party	ADR	29,710	10.26%	1
The Left	DL	5,785	2.00%	0
Communist Party of Luxembourg	KPL	2,834	0.98%	0
Citizens' List		2,286	0.79%	0
Total		289,547	100.00%	9
Valid votes		34,492		
Blank votes		1,286	3.48%	
Rejected votes – other		1,177	3.18%	
Total polled		36,955	92.98%	
Registered electors		39,743		

The following candidates were elected: André Bauler (DP), 7,169 votes; Jean Colombera (ADR), 5,110 votes; Fernand Etgen (DP), 10,423 votes; Camille Gira (DG), 9,441 votes; Marie-Josée Jacobs (CSV), 18,220 votes; Ali Kaes (CSV), 14,862 votes; Marco Schank (CSV), 16,760 votes; Romain Schneider (LSAP), 10,037 votes; and Lucien Weiler (CSV), 14,821 votes.

===== 2004 =====
Results of the 2004 general election held on 13 June 2004:

Party		Votes	%	Seats
Christian Social People's Party	CSV	100,665	36.27%	4
Democratic Party	DP	56,253	20.27%	2
Luxembourg Socialist Workers' Party	LSAP	43,812	15.78%	1
Alternative Democratic Reform Party	ADR	40,991	14.77%	1
The Greens	DG	30,186	10.88%	1
The Left	DL	3,725	1.34%	0
Free Party of Luxembourg	FPL	1,925	0.69%	0
Total		277,557	100.00%	9
Valid votes		32,839		
Blank votes		979	2.81%	
Rejected votes – other		984	2.83%	
Total polled		34,802	94.29%	
Registered electors		36,911		

The following candidates were elected: Emile Calmes (DP), 7,331 votes; Camille Gira (DG), 9,375 votes; Charles Goerens (DP), 16,788 votes; Marie-Josée Jacobs (CSV), 16,947 votes; Ali Kaes (CSV), 11,228 votes; Jean-Pierre Koepp (ADR), 8,245 votes; Marco Schank (CSV), 13,368 votes; Romain Schneider (LSAP), 6,508 votes; and Lucien Weiler (CSV), 10,957 votes.

==== 1990s ====
===== 1999 =====
Results of the 1999 general election held on 13 June 1999:

Party		Votes	%	Seats
Christian Social People's Party	CSV	80,642	31.25%	3
Democratic Party	DP	62,371	24.17%	2
Action Committee for Democracy and Pensions Justice	ADR	43,147	16.72%	2
Luxembourg Socialist Workers' Party	LSAP	42,625	16.52%	1
The Greens	DG	23,640	9.16%	1
The Left	DL	3,653	1.42%	0
Green and Liberal Alliance	GaL	1,985	0.77%	0
Total		258,063	100.00%	9
Valid votes		30,730		
Rejected votes		1,923	5.89%	
Total polled		32,653	87.63%	
Registered electors		37,263		

The following candidates were elected: Emile Calmes (DP), 9,488 votes; Jean Colombera (ADR), 5,000 votes; Camille Gira (DG), 7,707 votes; Charles Goerens (DP), 14,936 votes; Marie-Josée Jacobs (CSV), 13,700 votes; Jean-Pierre Koepp (ADR), 11,017 votes; Marco Schank (CSV), 9,407 votes; Lucien Weiler (CSV), 10,435 votes; and Georges Wohlfart (LSAP), 10,183 votes.

===== 1994 =====
Results of the 1994 general election held on 12 June 1994:

Party		Votes	%	Seats
Christian Social People's Party	CSV	83,935	33.24%	3
Democratic Party	DP	57,484	22.76%	2
Luxembourg Socialist Workers' Party	LSAP	48,003	19.01%	2
Action Committee for Democracy and Pensions Justice	ADR	35,249	13.96%	1
The Greens	GLEI-GAP	21,260	8.42%	1
National Movement	NB	4,683	1.85%	0
Communist Party of Luxembourg	KPL	1,918	0.76%	0
Total		252,532	100.00%	9
Valid votes		30,101		
Blank votes		1,096	3.41%	
Rejected votes – other		939	2.92%	
Total polled		32,136	89.62%	
Registered electors		35,857		

The following candidates were elected: Emile Calmes (DP), 9,107 votes; Camille Gira (GLEI-GAP), 6,207 votes; Charles Goerens (DP), 14,196 votes; Marie-Josée Jacobs (CSV), 16,333 votes; Édouard Juncker (CSV), 11,791 votes; Jean-Pierre Koepp (ADR), 9,257 votes; Camille Weiler (LSAP), 6,450 votes; Lucien Weiler (CSV), 9,374 votes; and Georges Wohlfart (LSAP), 11,591 votes.

==== 1980s ====
===== 1989 =====
Results of the 1989 general election held on 18 June 1989:

Party		Votes	%	Seats
Christian Social People's Party	CSV	92,769	37.64%	4
Democratic Party	DP	55,760	22.62%	2
Luxembourg Socialist Workers' Party	LSAP	48,900	19.84%	2
Action Committee 5/6 Pensions for Everyone	5/6	24,773	10.05%	1
Ecological List for the North	GLEI-GAP	16,649	6.75%	0
List for Ice Cream and a Regional Policy	LERP	4,013	1.63%	0
Communist Party of Luxembourg	KPL	3,626	1.47%	0
Total		246,490	100.00%	9
Valid votes		29,323		
Blank votes		948	3.06%	
Rejected votes – other		759	2.45%	
Total polled		31,030	88.25%	
Registered electors		35,161		

The following candidates were elected: Emile Calmes (DP), 7,752 votes; Charles Goerens (DP), 11,207 votes; Marie-Josée Jacobs (CSV), 11,361 votes; Édouard Juncker (CSV), 11,957 votes; Jean-Pierre Koepp (5/6), 4,294 votes; Henri Mausen (CSV), 11,773 votes; René Steichen (CSV), 12,496 votes; Camille Weiler (LSAP), 7,612 votes; and Georges Wohlfart (LSAP), 8,226 votes.

===== 1984 =====
Results of the 1984 general election held on 17 June 1984:

Party		Votes	%	Seats
Christian Social People's Party	CSV	109,270	45.76%	5
Democratic Party	DP	62,510	26.18%	2
Luxembourg Socialist Workers' Party	LSAP	58,673	24.57%	2
Independent Socialist Party	PSI	4,607	1.93%	0
Communist Party of Luxembourg	KPL	3,709	1.55%	0
Total		238,769	100.00%	9
Valid votes		28,656		
Blank votes		1,072	3.52%	
Rejected votes – other		753	2.47%	
Total polled		30,481	89.14%	
Registered electors		34,194		

The following candidates were elected: Jean-Pierre Dichter (CSV), 14,074 votes; Charles Goerens (DP), 11,646 votes; René Hübsch (DP), 9,388 votes; Marie-Josée Jacobs (CSV), 12,249 votes; Édouard Juncker (CSV), 16,673 votes; René Steichen (CSV), 13,142 votes; Camille Weiler (LSAP), 8,451 votes; Lucien Weiler (CSV), 11,317 votes; and Georges Wohlfart (LSAP), 8,076 votes.

==== 1970s ====
===== 1979 =====
Results of the 1979 general election held on 10 June 1979:

Party		Votes	%	Seats
Christian Social People's Party	CSV	106,600	44.64%	5
Democratic Party	DP	47,631	19.95%	2
Luxembourg Socialist Workers' Party	LSAP	40,865	17.11%	1
Social Democratic Party	SDP	23,552	9.86%	1
Enrôlés de Force	EDF	15,204	6.37%	0
Communist Party of Luxembourg	KPL	3,639	1.52%	0
Alternative List - Worth it		1,304	0.55%	0
Total		238,795	100.00%	9
Valid votes		27,977		
Blank votes		828	2.76%	
Rejected votes – other		1,167	3.89%	
Total polled		29,972	89.46%	
Registered electors		33,502		

The following candidates were elected: Victor Abens (LSAP), 9,230 votes; Henry Cravatte (SDP), 7,410 votes; Jean-Pierre Dichter (CSV), 11,312 votes; Emile Gerson (CSV), 11,521 votes; Charles Goerens (DP), 11,646 votes; René Hübsch (DP), 5,731 votes; Édouard Juncker (CSV), 14,832 votes; Camille Ney (CSV), 15,483 votes; and René Steichen (CSV), 11,733 votes.

===== 1974 =====
Results of the 1974 general election held on 26 May 1974:

Party		Votes	%	Seats
Christian Social People's Party	CSV	98,176	40.68%	4
Democratic Party	DP	54,890	22.75%	2
Luxembourg Socialist Workers' Party	LSAP	49,680	20.59%	2
Social Democratic Party	SDP	30,802	12.76%	1
Communist Party of Luxembourg	KPL	6,876	2.85%	0
Revolutionary Communist League	LCR	889	0.37%	0
Total		241,313	100.00%	9
Valid votes		28,263		
Blank votes		450	1.50%	
Rejected votes – other		1,284	4.28%	
Total polled		29,997	89.46%	
Registered electors		33,533		

The following candidates were elected: Victor Abens (LSAP), 10,929 votes; Henry Cravatte (SDP), 9,679 votes; Emile Gerson (CSV), 12,305 votes; Frankie Hansen (LSAP), 7,831 votes; Édouard Juncker (CSV), 12,273 votes; Camille Ney (CSV), 16,126 votes; Alex Wantz (DP), 9,052 votes; Jean Winkin (CSV), 11,586 votes; and Frank Wolff (DP), 8,356 votes.

==== 1960s ====
===== 1968 =====
Results of the 1968 general election held on 15 December 1968:

Party		Votes	%	Seats
Christian Social People's Party	CSV	102,805	46.40%	4
Luxembourg Socialist Workers' Party	LSAP	66,626	30.07%	3
Democratic Party	DP	42,409	19.14%	2
Communist Party of Luxembourg	KPL	9,049	4.08%	0
National Solidarity		682	0.31%	0
Total		221,571	100.00%	9
Valid votes		26,155		
Blank votes		577	2.07%	
Rejected votes – other		1,078	3.88%	
Total polled		27,810	86.81%	
Registered electors		32,037		

The following candidates were elected: Victor Abens (LSAP), 11,744 votes; Jean-Pierre Büchler (CSV), 13,410 votes; Henry Cravatte (LSAP), 12,940 votes; Henri Diederich (DP), 6,289 votes; Emile Gerson (CSV), 12,121 votes; Frankie Hansen (LSAP), 8,706 votes; Camille Ney (CSV), 13,018 votes; Alex Wantz (DP), 6,416 votes; and Jean Winkin (CSV), 13,204 votes.

===== 1964 =====
Results of the 1964 general election held on 7 June 1964:

Party		Votes	%	Seats
Christian Social People's Party	CSV	107,098	45.58%	5
Luxembourg Socialist Workers' Party	LSAP	77,874	33.14%	3
Democratic Party	DP	36,533	15.55%	1
Popular Independent Movement	MIP	7,536	3.21%	0
Communist Party of Luxembourg	KPL	5,947	2.53%	0
Total		234,988	100.00%	9
Valid votes		27,706		
Blank votes		646	2.18%	
Rejected votes – other		1,269	4.28%	
Total polled		29,621	90.28%	
Registered electors		32,811		

The following candidates were elected: Victor Abens (LSAP), 11,629 votes; Henry Cravatte (LSAP), 13,643 votes; Henri Diederich (DP), 6,407 votes; Nicolas Ferring (CSV), 12,357 votes; Frankie Hansen (LSAP), 10,171 votes; Joseph Herr (CSV), 12,559 votes; Camille Ney (CSV), 13,792 votes; Georges Wagner (CSV), 14,200 votes; and Jean Winkin (CSV), 13,435 votes.

==== 1950s ====
===== 1959 =====
Results of the 1959 general election held on 1 February 1959:

Party		Votes	%	Seats
Christian Social People's Party	CSV	133,560	47.45%	5
Luxembourg Socialist Workers' Party	LSAP	81,028	28.78%	3
Democratic Party	DP	66,913	23.77%	2
Total		281,501	100.00%	10
Valid votes		29,580		
Rejected votes		1,163	3.78%	
Total polled		30,743	91.51%	
Registered electors		33,594		

The following candidates were elected: Victor Abens (LSAP), 11,264 votes; Henry Cravatte (LSAP), 13,327 votes; Henri Diederich (DP), 9,192 votes; Michel Ewen (LSAP), 10,496 votes; Nicolas Ferring (CSV), 14,500 votes; Henri Gengler (CSV), 13,930 votes; Joseph Herr (CSV), 14,269 votes; Jean Peusch (DP), 9,187 votes; Georges Wagner (CSV), 14,372 votes; and Jean Winkin (CSV), 14,655 votes.

===== 1954 =====
Results of the 1954 general election held on 30 May 1954:

Party		Votes	%	Seats
Christian Social People's Party	CSV	177,087	60.72%	7
Luxembourg Socialist Workers' Party	LSAP	72,577	24.88%	2
Democratic Group	GD	37,621	12.90%	1
Communist Party of Luxembourg	KPL	4,365	1.50%	0
Total		291,650	100.00%	10
Valid votes		30,506		
Rejected votes		1,228	3.87%	
Total polled		31,734	92.18%	
Registered electors		34,427		

The following candidates were elected: Victor Abens (LSAP), 10,333 votes; Michel Ewen (LSAP), 10,012 votes; Nicolas Ferring (CSV), 17,600 votes; Henri Gengler (CSV), 18,505 votes; Joseph Herr (CSV), 18,024 votes; Jean Peusch (GD), 5,539 votes; Alphonse Schiltges (CSV), 17,674 votes; Tony Schmit (CSV), 17,264 votes; Georges Wagner (CSV), 21,347 votes; and Jean Winkin (CSV), 20,387 votes.

===== 1951 =====
Results of the 1951 general election held on 3 June 1951:

Party		Votes	%	Seats
Christian Social People's Party	CSV	150,866	51.52%	6
Luxembourg Socialist Workers' Party	LSAP	70,537	24.09%	2
Democratic Group	GD	66,375	22.67%	2
Communist Party of Luxembourg	KPL	5,049	1.72%	0
Total		292,827	100.00%	10
Valid votes		30,573		
Blank votes		474	1.49%	
Rejected votes – other		793	2.49%	
Total polled		31,840	92.08%	
Registered electors		34,578		

The following candidates were elected: Victor Abens (LSAP), 10,484 votes; Auguste Delaporte (CSV), 15,244 votes; Michel Ewen (LSAP), 8,841 votes; Henri Gengler (CSV), 16,397 votes; Robert Schaffner (GD), 11,363 votes; Alphonse Schiltges (CSV), 14,872 votes; Tony Schmit (CSV), 15,815 votes; Joseph Simon (CSV), 17,475 votes; Georges Wagner (CSV), 19,518 votes; and Joseph Wenkin (GD), 7,762 votes.

==== 1940s ====
===== 1945 =====
Results of the 1945 general election held on 21 October 1945:

Party		Votes	%	Seats
Christian Social People's Party	CSV	180,478	60.98%	7
Patriotic and Democratic Group	GPD	58,368	19.72%	2
Luxembourg Workers' Party	LAP	48,241	16.30%	1
Communist Party of Luxembourg	KPL	8,869	3.00%	0
Total		295,956	100.00%	10
Valid votes		30,455		
Blank votes		231	0.73%	
Rejected votes – other		963	3.04%	
Total polled		31,649		
Registered electors				

The following candidates were elected: Victor Abens (LAP), 6,242 votes; Auguste Delaporte (CSV), 21,135 votes; Henri Gengler (CSV), 19,486 votes; Nicolas Mathieu (GPD), 8,938 votes; Émile Reuter (CSV), 21,133 votes; Alphonse Schiltges (CSV), 16,696 votes; Tony Schmit (CSV), 17,838 votes; Joseph Simon (CSV), 22,885 votes; Georges Wagner (CSV), 18,385 votes; and Joseph Wenkin (GPD), 10,196 votes.

==== 1930s ====
===== 1937 =====
Results of the 1937 general election held on 6 June 1937:

Party		Votes	%	Seats
Party of the Right	RP	185,620	58.42%	7
Luxembourg Workers' Party	LAP	52,599	16.55%	2
Free List of Farmers, the Middle Class and Workers	PBMA	32,265	10.15%	1
Liberal Party	LP	27,621	8.69%	1
Party of Farmers and the Middle Class		19,634	6.18%	0
Total		317,739	100.00%	11
Valid votes		31,080		
Blank votes		618	1.89%	
Rejected votes – other		1,050	3.21%	
Total polled		32,748		
Registered electors				

The following candidates were elected: François Erpelding (LAP), 6,978 votes; Henri Gengler (RP), 18,864 votes; Antoine Hansen (RP), 16,063 votes; Nicolas Mathieu (LP), 5,110 votes; Charles Peffer (RP), 17,165 votes; Pierre Prüm (PBMA), 8,377 votes; Émile Reuter (RP), 19,872 votes; Jean-Pierre Schloesser (RP), 16,035 votes; Tony Schmit (RP), 16,960 votes; Joseph Simon (RP), 19,322 votes; and Etienne Weber (LAP), 6,232 votes.

===== 1931 =====
Results of the 1931 general election held on 7 June 1931:

Party		Votes	%	Seats
Party of the Right	RP	163,508	56.13%	7
Party of Farmers and the Middle Class	BMP	46,446	15.95%	2
Luxembourg Workers' Party	LAP	37,923	13.02%	1
Progressive Democratic Party of the North	FDP	35,702	12.26%	1
Radical Party	RP	7,701	2.64%	0
Total		291,280	100.00%	11
Valid votes		28,869		
Blank votes		389	1.28%	
Rejected votes – other		1,086	3.58%	
Total polled		30,344		
Registered electors				

The following candidates were elected: Auguste Delaporte (RP), 14,783 votes; François Erpelding (LAP), 7,405 votes; Henri Gengler (RP), 17,488 votes; Antoine Hansen (RP), 14,801 votes; Eugène Hoffmann (BMP), 10,194 votes; Ernest Lamborelle (RP), 17,866 votes; Nicolas Mathieu (FDP), 7,123 votes; Nicolas Meyers (RP), 15,145 votes; Émile Reuter (RP), 18,804 votes; Joseph Simon (RP), 15,683 votes; and Jean-Pierre Wenkin (BMP), 7,223 votes.

==== 1920s ====
===== 1925 =====
Results of the 1925 general election held on 1 March 1925:

Party		Votes	%	Seats
Party of the Right	RP	154,347	53.12%	6
Independent National Party	ONP	80,895	27.84%	3
Independent Party of the Right	ORP	27,806	9.57%	1
Luxembourg Workers' Party	LAP	27,498	9.46%	1
Total		290,546	100.00%	11
Valid votes		26,751		
Blank votes		197	0.70%	
Rejected votes – other		1,060	3.78%	
Total polled		28,008		
Registered electors				

The following candidates were elected: Théodore Boever (ONP), 8,465 votes; Auguste Delaporte (RP), 14,755 votes; François Erpelding (LAP), 5,718 votes; Antoine Hansen (RP), 13,921 votes; Eugène Hoffmann (ORP), 11,426 votes; Ernest Lamborelle (RP), 15,458 votes; Nicolas Mathieu (ONP), 8,308 votes; Nicolas Meyers (RP), 15,503 votes; Egide Petges (RP), 13,551 votes; Pierre Prüm (ONP), 11,310 votes; and Émile Reuter (RP), 22,536 votes.

===== 1922 =====
Results of the 1922 general election held on 28 May 1922:

Party		Votes	%	Seats
Party of the Right	RP	176,670	59.12%	7
Independent National Party	ONP	97,271	32.55%	4
Socialist Party	SP	24,879	8.33%	1
Total		298,820	100.00%	12
Valid votes				
Blank votes				
Rejected votes – other				
Total polled				
Registered electors				

The following candidates were elected: Théodore Boever (ONP), 10,046 votes; Auguste Delaporte (RP), 16,316 votes; François Erpelding (SP), 4,786 votes; Alphonse Greisch (ONP), 9,551 votes; Antoine Hansen (RP), 14,915 votes; Eugène Hoffmann (RP), 17,996 votes; Nicolas Klein (RP), 13,863 votes; Nicolas Mathieu (ONP), 9,438 votes; Nicolas Meyers (RP), 17,457 votes; Egide Petges (RP), 14,754 votes; Pierre Prüm (ONP), 10,888 votes; and Georges Thinnes (RP), 13,902 votes.

==== 1910s ====
===== 1919 =====
Results of the 1919 general election held on 26 October 1919:

Party		Votes	%	Seats
Party of the Right	RP	211,159	64.58%	8
Independent National Party	ONP	82,297	25.17%	3
Socialist Party	SP	29,546	9.04%	1
Independent People's Party	FV	3,949	1.21%	0
Total		326,951	100.00%	12
Valid votes		28,795		
Rejected votes		1,195	3.98%	
Total polled		29,990		
Registered electors				

The following candidates were elected: Théodore Boever (ONP), 10,569 votes; Auguste Delaporte (RP), 19,475 votes; François Erpelding (SP), 3,085 votes; Jean Gérard (RP), 16,633 votes; Antoine Hansen (RP), 17,866 votes; Eugène Hoffmann (RP), 20,507 votes; Mathias Jungers (RP), 16,548 votes; Nicolas Klein (RP), 16,577 votes; Bernard Krack (ONP), 7,178 votes; Nicolas Meyers (RP), 19,785 votes; Pierre Prüm (ONP), 10,597 votes; and Pierre Schiltz (RP), 20,026 votes.
