= Constituencies of Luxembourg =

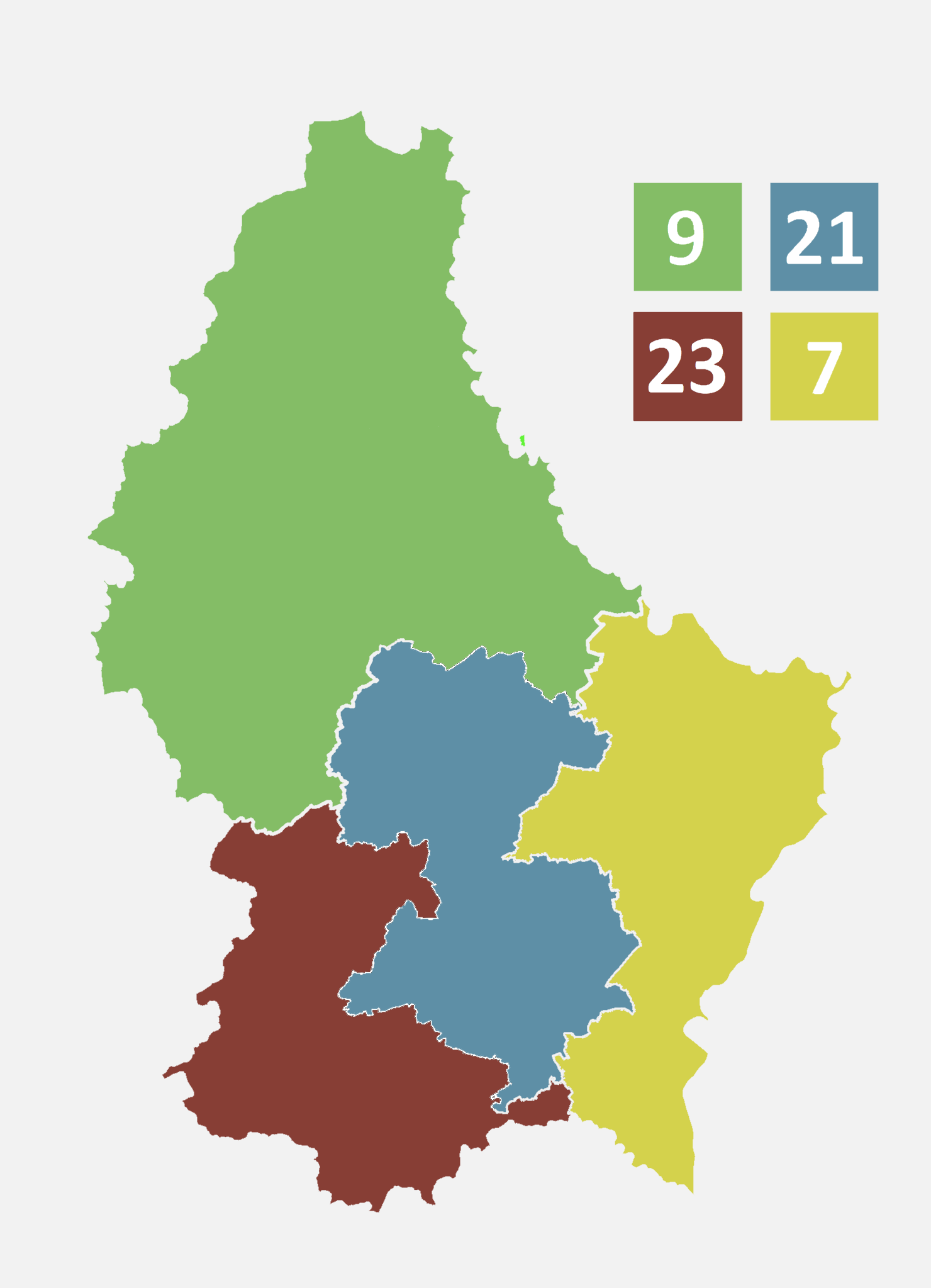
The four constituencies of Luxembourg with number of seats. North South Centre East

Constituencies (Luxembourgish: Walbezierker; French: Circonscriptions électorales; German: Wahlkreisen) are used to elect representatives ('deputies') to Luxembourg's unicameral national legislature, the Chamber of Deputies.

The basic principles of electoral law in Luxembourg are drawn out by Articles 63 and 64 of the Constitution. The number of deputies is set at sixty, and boundaries of the constituencies are based on administrative cantonal boundaries. As a result, the constituencies have greatly differing populations, so each elects a different number of deputies, dependent upon the share of the national population.

Suffrage is universal and compulsory amongst adult resident citizens not otherwise disqualified. Luxembourg's electoral system is a form of the Hagenbach-Bischoff system (a variant of the D'Hondt method), which allocates seats to party lists by proportion of the votes won in each constituency. Under Luxembourg's system, each citizen may vote for as many candidates as there are deputies elected from that constituency. As a result, the national popular vote has no significance, as it reflects only the number of votes cast, and not the number of voters or the number of deputies elected.

== Constituencies ==
There are four constituencies in Luxembourg:

Name	Cantons	Population (2024)	Deputies elected
Centre	Luxembourg and Mersch	243,912	21
East	Echternach, Grevenmacher and Remich	77,721	7
North	Clervaux, Diekirch, Redange, Vianden, and Wiltz	103,326	9
South	Capellen and Esch-sur-Alzette	247,091	23

The proposition to replace these four constituencies with a single, nationwide constituency has gained some traction in recent decades. Opinion polling conducted at the time of each general election has put public support for the proposition at 25% (1999), 53% (2009) and 69% (2013 and 2018), with voters of smaller parties favouring it the most. As of 2023, of the parties represented in the Chamber of Deputies, four (LSAP, Greens, Left and Pirates) were in favour and three (CSV, DP and ADR) were against the reform.
