= Marco Schank =

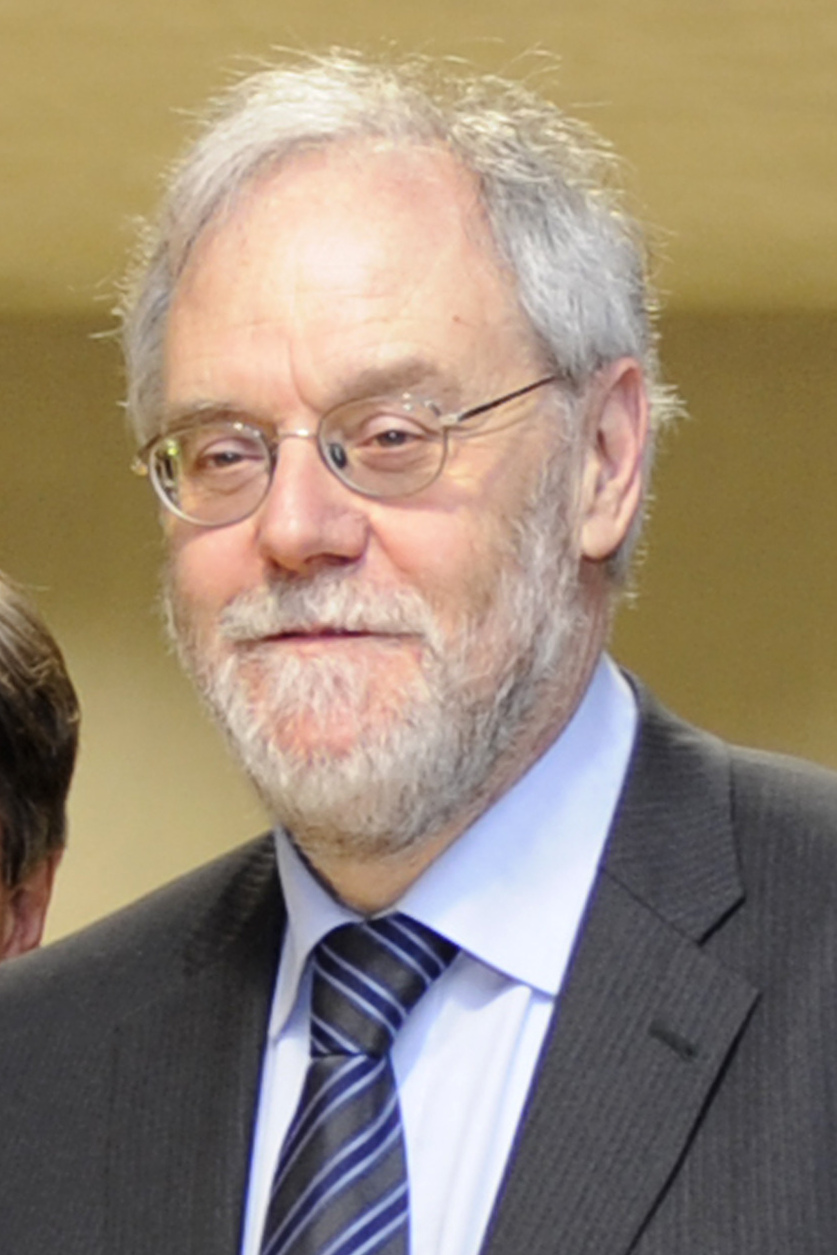
Schank in 2013

Marco Schank (born 10 October 1954 in Ettelbruck) is a Luxembourgish politician for the Christian Social People's Party (CSV) and author. He was a member of the Chamber of Deputies, representing the North constituency, from 1999 to 2009 and from 2013 to 2020.

He was the mayor of Heiderscheid from 1994 to 2009, and has been the mayor of Esch-sur-Sûre, into which Heiderscheid was merged in 2011, since 2017. Prior to that, he was a councillor in Heinerscheid (1982–1993).

Schank is the President of the Upper Sûre Natural Park, and was President of the National Tourism Office from 2000 to 2009. He was the Secretary-General of the CSV from 2006 to 2009, having first joined the party in 1994.

== Footnotes ==
Party political offices
| Preceded by Jean-Louis Schiltz | General Secretary of the CSV; 2006 – 2009 | Succeeded by Marc Spautz |
