= Elections in Luxembourg =

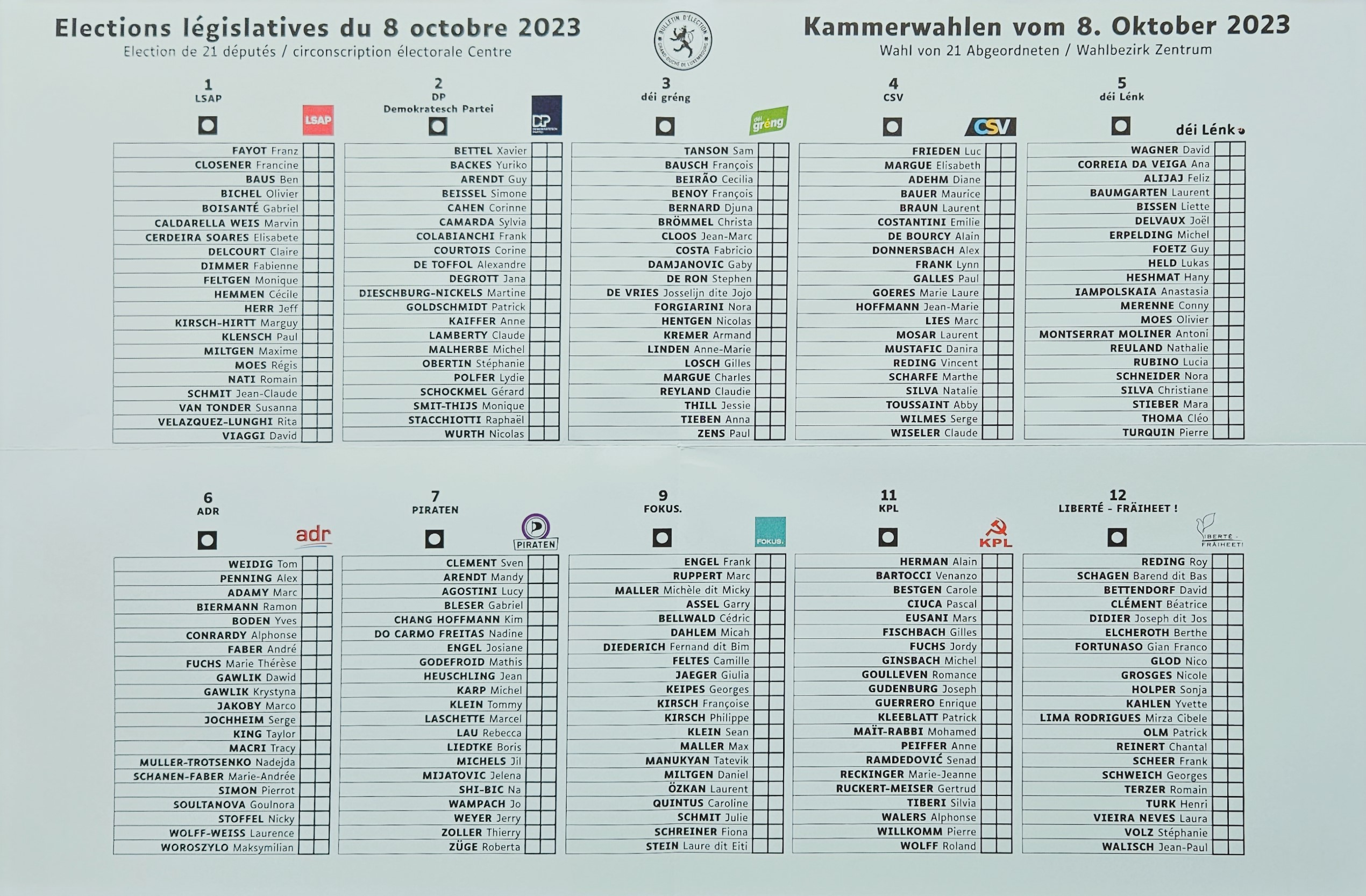
Sample ballot from the 2023 general election

Elections in Luxembourg are held to determine the political composition of the representative institutions of the Grand Duchy of Luxembourg. Luxembourg is a liberal representative democracy, with universal suffrage guaranteed under its constitution. Elections are held regularly, and are considered to be fair and free.

Separate elections are held to elect representatives at municipal, national and European levels. The main institution to which members are elected is the Chamber of Deputies, the national legislature and the sole source of membership, confidence and supply of the government. Luxembourg is represented by six MEPs to the European Parliament, who are elected simultaneously with elections held in other European Union member states.

The country has a multi-party system, traditionally defined by the existence of three large political parties: the Christian Social People's Party (CSV), the Democratic Party (DP), and the Luxembourg Socialist Workers' Party (LSAP). Historically, the three parties have won a large majority of the votes between them, but their total percentage has fallen recently, such that two additional parties, The Greens and the Alternative Democratic Reform Party (ADR) have recorded over 8% of votes at each of last two legislative elections. The CSV and its predecessor (Party of the Right) has provided the Prime Minister for all but 12 years since 1918, and has always been the largest party in the legislature. In this respect, Luxembourg has certain features of a dominant-party system, although coalition governments are the norm and the previous two governments from 2013 to 2023 did not involve the CSV.

== Latest election ==
Party	Votes	%	Seats
Christian Social People's Party	1,099,427	29.21	21
Luxembourg Socialist Workers' Party	711,890	18.91	11
Democratic Party (Luxembourg)	703,833	18.70	14
Alternative Democratic Reform Party	348,990	9.27	5
The Greens (Luxembourg)	321,895	8.55	4
Pirate Party Luxembourg	253,554	6.74	3
The Left (Luxembourg)	147,839	3.93	2
Fokus (Luxembourg)	93,839	2.49	0
Liberté - Fräiheet!	42,643	1.13	0
Communist Party of Luxembourg	24,275	0.64	0
The Conservatives (Luxembourg)	8,494	0.23	0
Volt Luxembourg	7,001	0.19	0
Total	3,763,680	100.00	60

== Compulsory voting ==
Luxembourg's electoral system operates on the basis of compulsory voting, with a few exceptions. Luxembourg citizens aged under 75 years who reside in Luxembourg are required to vote, unless they reside in a different municipality from the one in which they are called to vote.

Luxembourg citizens aged over 75 years, as well as Luxembourg citizens of any age who do not reside in Luxembourg, are not required to vote. If they choose to register to vote, voting becomes mandatory for them. Non-Luxembourg citizens who are eligible to vote in municipal and/or European Parliament elections are not automatically required to vote; however, if they choose to register to vote, voting becomes mandatory for them. The failure of a person to vote when required to law to do so is punishable upon the first offence by a fine of between €100 and €250. A repeat offence within 5 years is punishable by a fine of between €500 and €1,000.

== Chamber of Deputies ==
Luxembourg's national legislature is the unicameral Chamber of Deputies (Luxembourgish Chamber, French: Chambre des députés, German: Abgeordnetenkammer). The Chamber has 60 members, known as 'deputies', elected for a five-year term in four multi-seat constituencies, known as 'circonscriptions'. Seats are allocated by proportional representation, using the Hagenbach-Bischoff system. The most recent election took place in October 2023 and the next is scheduled for 2028.

=== Eligibility ===
The four legislative constituencies of Luxembourg.

To be eligible to vote in elections to the Chamber of Deputies, one must fulfil the following criteria:

- Be a Luxembourgish citizen.
- Be at least 18 years of age on election day.
- Have never been convicted of a criminal offence.
- Otherwise be in full possession of one's political rights (e.g. not be certified as insane).

In addition to the criteria outlined above, a person standing for election to the Chamber of Deputies must be resident in Luxembourg. Furthermore, judges and members of the Council of State cannot stand for election.

=== Constituencies ===
Deputies are elected from four constituencies ('circonscriptions'). They are arranged geographically, as combinations of the twelve traditional cantons. The four circonscriptions are Centre, Est, Nord and Sud.

As the constituencies are based on geographical regions and traditional borders, they have greatly differing populations. To reflect this, each constituency elects a different number of deputies; Sud, with 40% of the national population, elects 23 deputies, whilst Est, with only 12% of the population, elects seven. Voters can cast as many votes as their constituency elects deputies (so voters residing in Est can vote for up to seven candidates), which may be spread across party lists or concentrated in one single party.

=== Electoral system ===
The seats are allocated according to the Hagenbach-Bischoff system.

=== Latest election ===
Party	Votes	%	Seats	+/–
Christian Social People's Party	1,099,427	29.21	21	0
Luxembourg Socialist Workers' Party	711,890	18.91	11	+1
Democratic Party	703,833	18.70	14	+2
Alternative Democratic Reform Party	348,990	9.27	5	+1
The Greens	321,895	8.55	4	–5
Pirate Party Luxembourg	253,554	6.74	3	+1
The Left	147,839	3.93	2	0
Fokus	93,839	2.49	0	New
Liberté - Fräiheet!	42,643	1.13	0	New
Communist Party of Luxembourg	24,275	0.64	0	0
The Conservatives	8,494	0.23	0	0
Volt Luxembourg	7,001	0.19	0	New
Total	3,763,680	100.00	60	0
Valid votes	231,344	92.55		
Invalid votes	10,735	4.29		
Blank votes	7,889	3.16		
Total votes	249,968	100.00		
Registered voters/turnout	286,711	87.18		
Source: Government of Luxembourg

== European Parliament ==
Since 1979, Luxembourg has elected members to the European Parliament, which is the primary representative body of the EU, and, with the Council of the European Union, forms its legislative branch. Due to its small size, the Grand Duchy elects just six members out of a total of 732, which is more than only Malta (which elects five MEPs); nonetheless, Luxembourg's representation is disproportionately large compared to its population, and Luxembourg elects more MEPs per capita than any other country (see: Apportionment in the European Parliament).

MEPs are elected to five-year terms. The exact date of elections is decided by Luxembourg, allowing it to schedule them on the same date as elections to the Chamber of Deputies (as is usually the case).

=== Eligibility ===
To be eligible to vote in elections to the European Parliament, one must fulfil the following criteria:

- Be a citizen of the European Union.
- Be at least 18 years of age on election day.
- Have never been convicted of a criminal offence.
- Otherwise be in full possession of one's political rights (e.g. not be certified as insane) in one's country of citizenship (Luxembourg or another Member State).

In addition to the criteria outlined above, any person standing for election to the European Parliament to represent Luxembourg must be resident in Luxembourg. There is one extra requirement for non-Luxembourgish citizens: they must be in full possession of their political rights in both Luxembourg and their Member State of citizenship.

=== Electoral system ===
The seats are allocated according to the D'Hondt method.

=== Past elections ===
- 1999 European election
- 2004 European election
- 2009 European election
- 2014 European election

== Local elections ==
Each commune (municipality) has an elected communal council. The number of councillors varies from 7 to 19 based on the number of inhabitants; the exception being the City of Luxembourg whose communal council consists of 27 members.

The councillors are directly elected every six years on the second Sunday of October. The last elections were held on 11 June 2023. The law of 15 December 2017 further defines that if the parliamentary and communal elections coincide, the latter are held in June of that year.

== Referendums ==
The referendum was introduced into the Constitution of Luxembourg by the constitutional amendment of 1919. The Constitution mentions the referendum in Article 51: "Voters will be asked to vote by way of referendum in the cases and under the conditions determined by law." The only details on the carrying out of referendums are found in Article 114, which deals with constitutional amendments. There are no other provisions regarding referendums in Luxembourg.

A constitutional amendment must first be passed by a two-thirds absolute super-majority of the Parliament, and then:

- either passed again after at least three months under the same terms, or
- passed on the referendum, if a referendum is requested in first two months of the three-month period by either:
  - either one quarter of members of the Parliament, or
  - 25,000 registered voters.

Referendum on constitutional amendments (defined in Article 114) are binding. Referendums in general (defined in Article 51) are not explicitly stated as be binding.

The general framework of the organisational arrangements of referendums is established by the Law of 4 February 2005 on national referendums.

There have been four referendums in Luxembourg since 1919:

- the referendum on head of state and economic union in 1919
- the referendum on banning the Communist party in 1937
- the European Constitution referendum in 2005
- the Luxembourg constitutional referendum in 2015

None of the referendums were constitutional amendments, so were non-binding.

== See also ==
- Electoral calendar
- Electoral system
