= Next Luxembourg general election =

- On or before 8 October 2028
- All 60 seats in Chamber of Deputies; 31 seats needed for a majority
Party	Leader	Current seats
CSV	Luc Frieden	21
DP	Xavier Bettel	14
LSAP	Taina Bofferding	12
ADR	Fred Keup	5
Greens	Sam Tanson	4
Pirates	Sven Clement	2
The Left	Marc Baum	2
Incumbent Prime Minister
Luc Frieden; CSV

A general election is to be held in Luxembourg on or before 8 October 2028 to elect all 60 seats of the Chamber of Deputies.

== Electoral system ==
The 60 members of the Chamber of Deputies are elected by proportional representation in four multi-member constituencies; nine in North constituency, seven in East, 23 in South and 21 in Centre. Voters can vote for a party list or cast multiple votes for as many candidates as there are seats. Seat allocation is calculated in accordance with the Hagenbach-Bischoff quota.

Only Luxembourgish citizens may vote in general elections. Voting is mandatory for eligible Luxembourgish citizens who live in Luxembourg and are under 75 years of age. Luxembourgish citizens who live abroad may vote by post at the commune in which they most recently lived in Luxembourg. Luxembourgish citizens who were born in Luxembourg but have never lived there may vote by post at the commune in which they were born. Luxembourgish citizens who were not born in Luxembourg and have never lived there may vote by post at the commune of Luxembourg City.

== Opinion polls ==
=== Voting intention ===
Fieldwork date	Polling firm	CSV	LSAP	DP	DG	ADR	PPLU	DL	KPL	DK	Liberté - Fräiheet!	Volt	Fokus
22 Sep – 2 Oct 2026	ILRES	22.8%	18.2%	21.7%	10.0%	12.8%	4.0%	5.5%	0.7%	0.3%	1.0%	0.3%	2.6%
13–24 Apr 2026	ILRES	21.8%	20.9%	21.5%	9.5%	11.4%	3.8%	5.8%	0.2%	0.3%	2.1%	0.6%	2.2%
15–29 Sep 2025	ILRES	25.3%	18.7%	19.7%	9.3%	11.6%	4.4%	5.9%	0.4%	0.5%	2.0%	0.2%	1.9%
8–24 Apr 2025	ILRES	29.1%	17.9%	21.0%	10.5%	9.3%	3.5%	4.8%	0.3%	0.3%	1.2%	0.2%	1.9%
23–30 Sep 2024	ILRES	28.9%	20.0%	18.9%	10.1%	10.7%	3.2%	3.7%	0.5%	0.2%	1.9%	0.3%	1.7%
9 June 2024	European election	22.91%	21.72%	18.29%	11.76%	11.76%	4.92%	3.15%	0.97%	0.58%	-	1.04%	1.60%
8 Oct 2023	Election	29.22%	18.92%	18.70%	8.55%	9.27%	6.74%	3.93%	0.64%	0.27%	1.13%	0.19%	2.49%

=== Seat projections ===
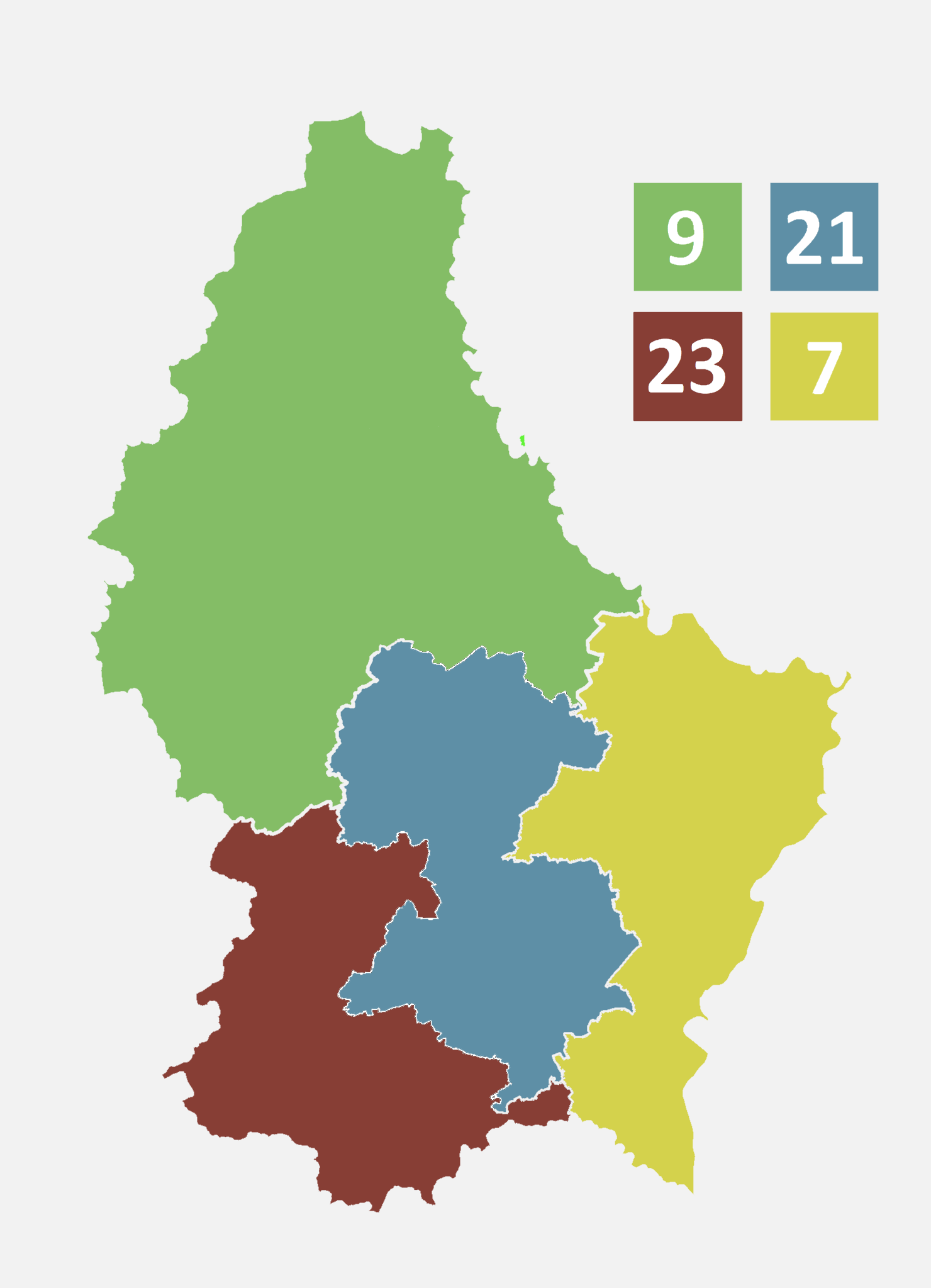
Map of Luxembourg's constituencies with number of seats

Fieldwork date	Polling firm	CSV	DP	LSAP	DG	ADR	PPLU	DL	Gov.
22 Sep – 2 Oct 2026	ILRES	15	15	12	7	8	1	2	30
13–24 Apr 2026	ILRES	15	15	14	6	7	1	2	30
15–29 Sep 2025	ILRES	17	14	13	5	7	2	2	31
8–24 Apr 2025	ILRES	21	14	11	7	4	1	2	35
23–30 Sep 2024	ILRES	20	13	13	6	6	0	2	33
9 June 2024	European election	2	1	1	1	1	0	0	3
8 Oct 2023	Election	21	14	11	4	5	3	2	35
