= 2024 European Parliament election in Luxembourg =

European parliament elections

- 9 June 2024

All 6 Luxembourgish seats to the European Parliament
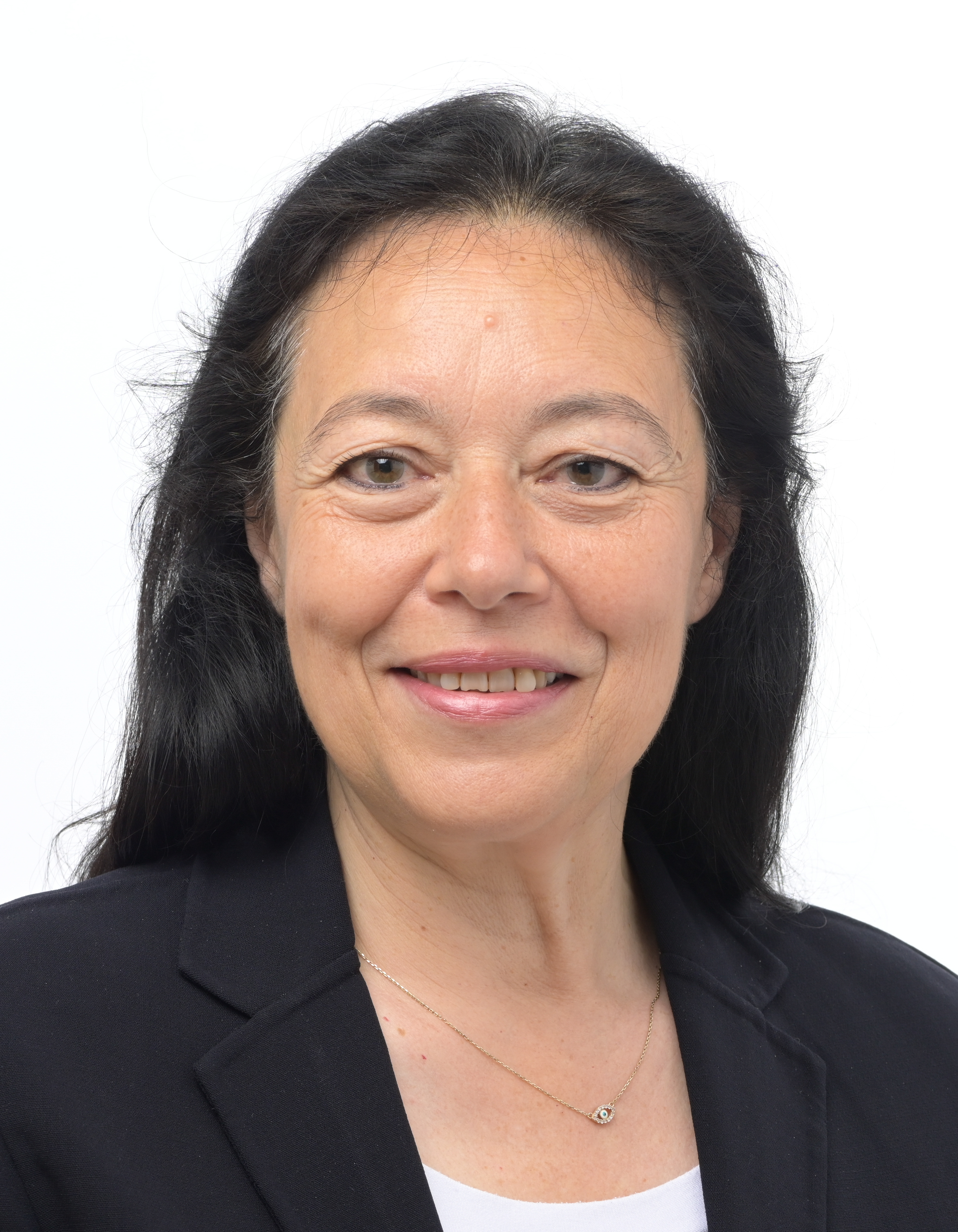

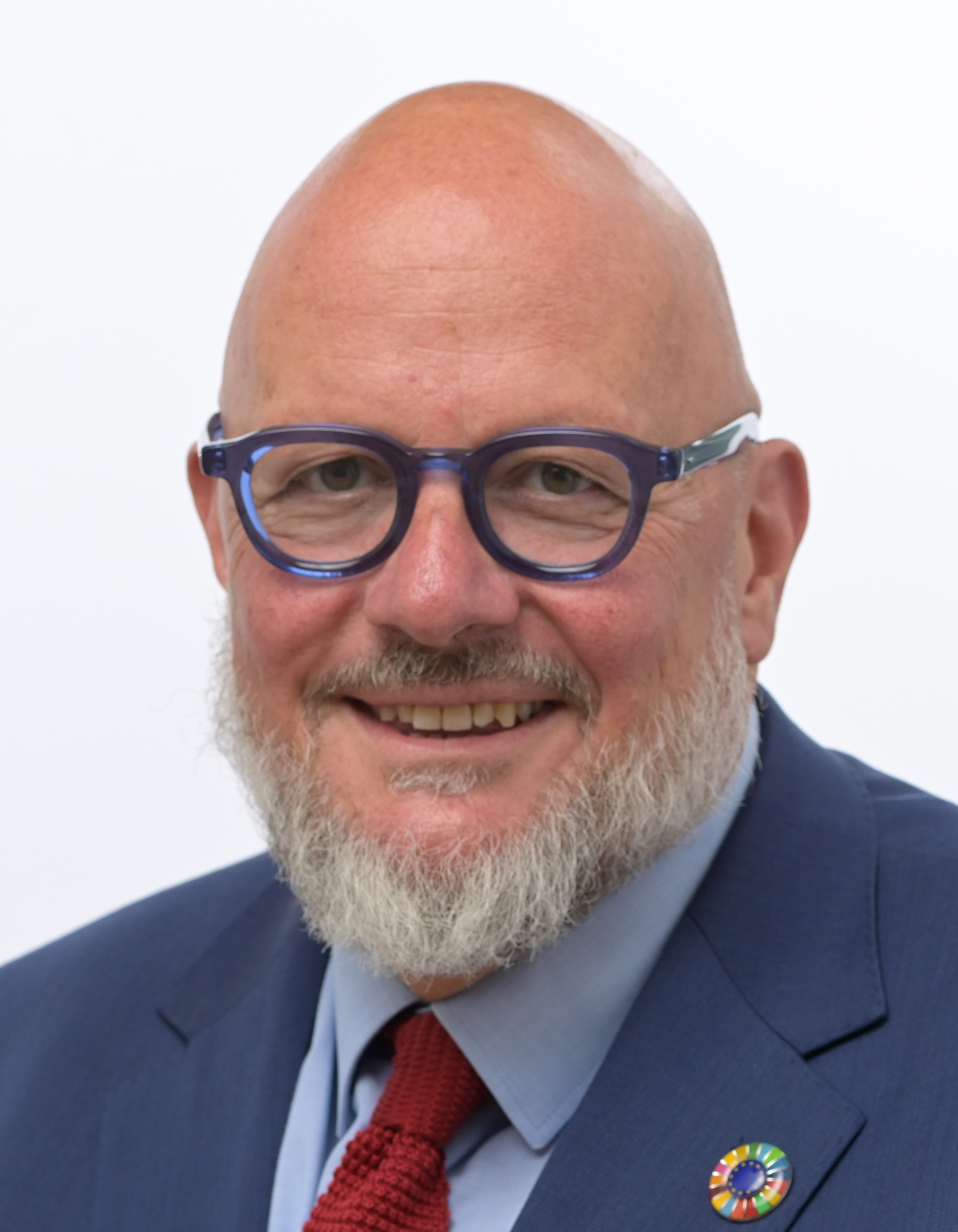

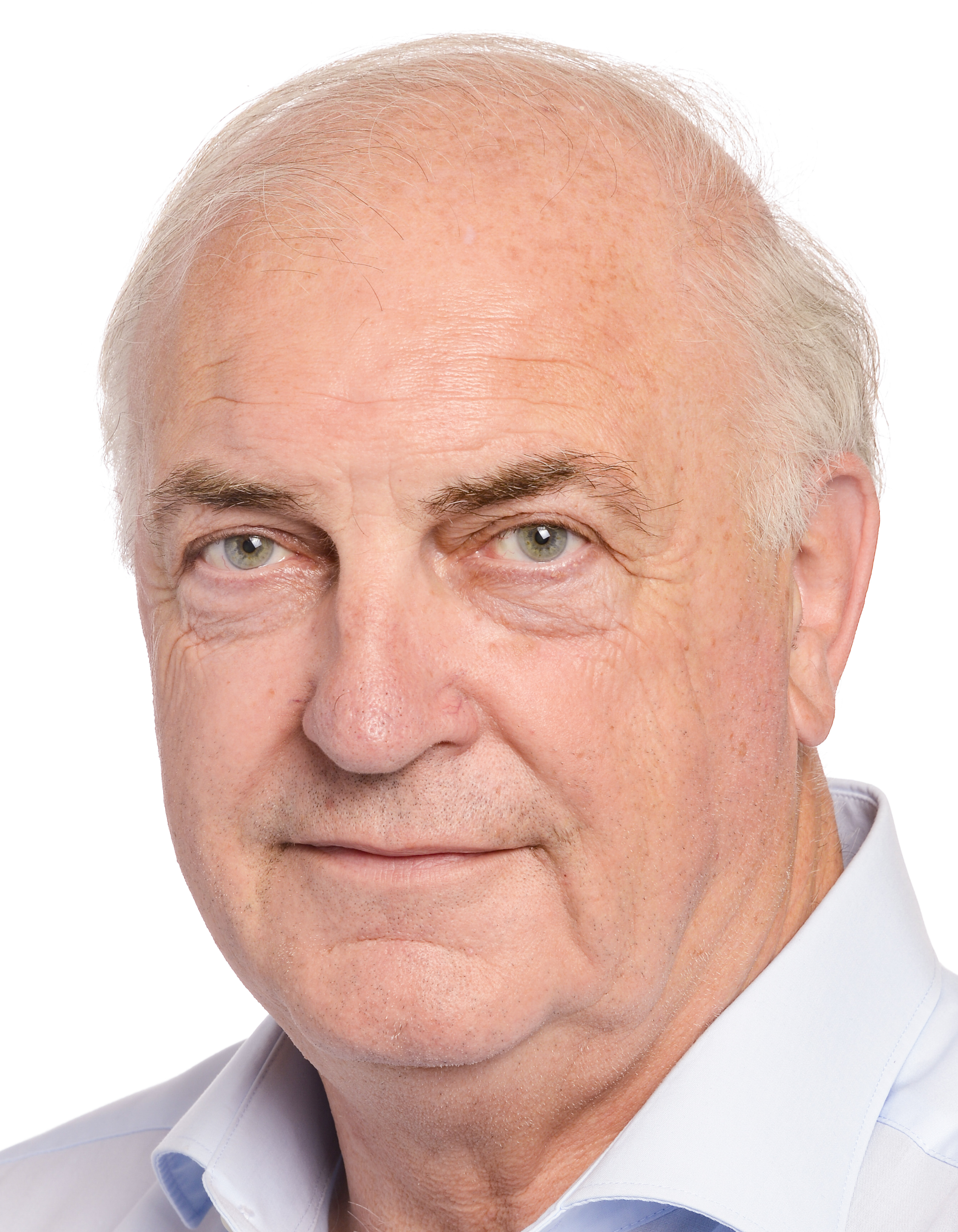

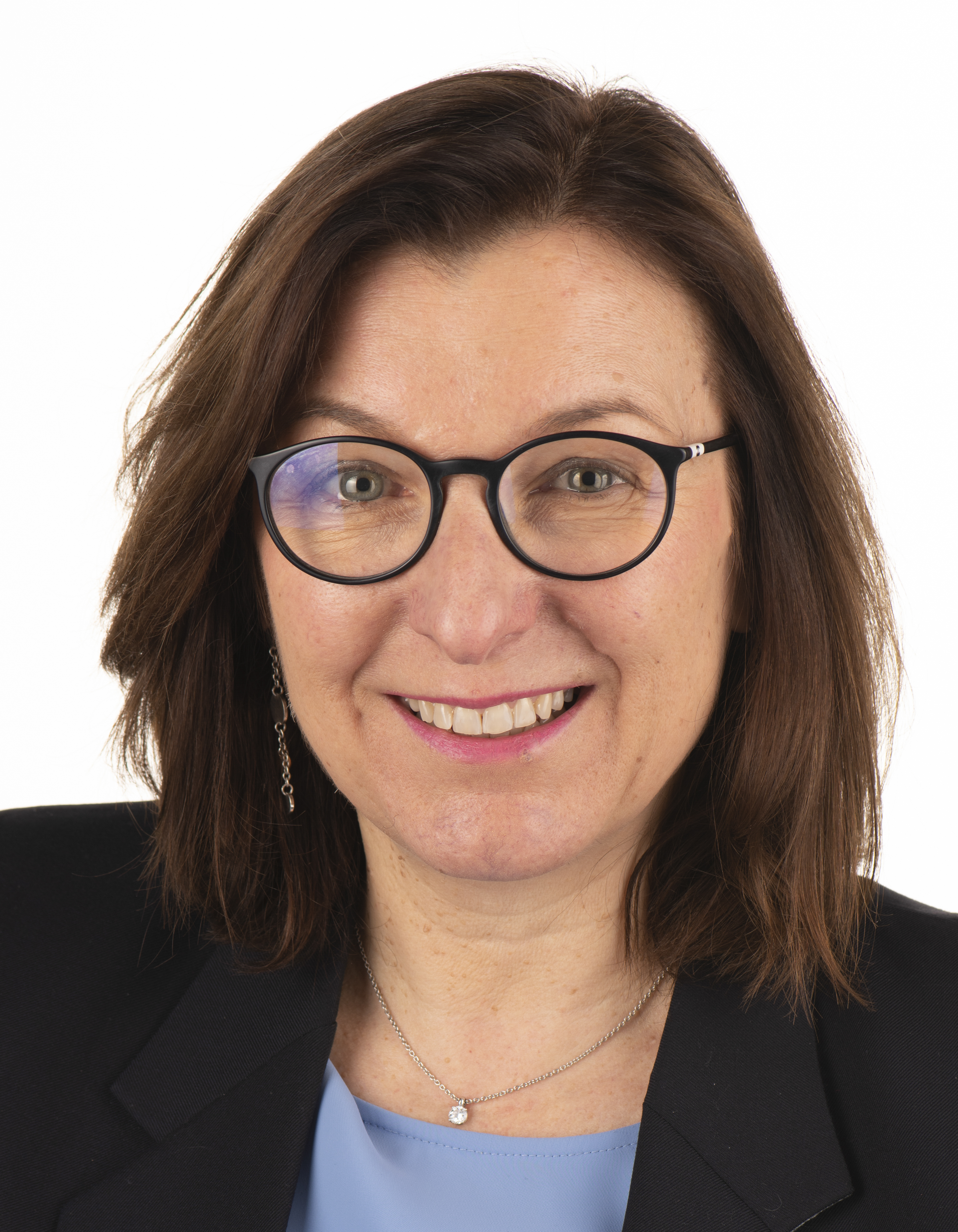

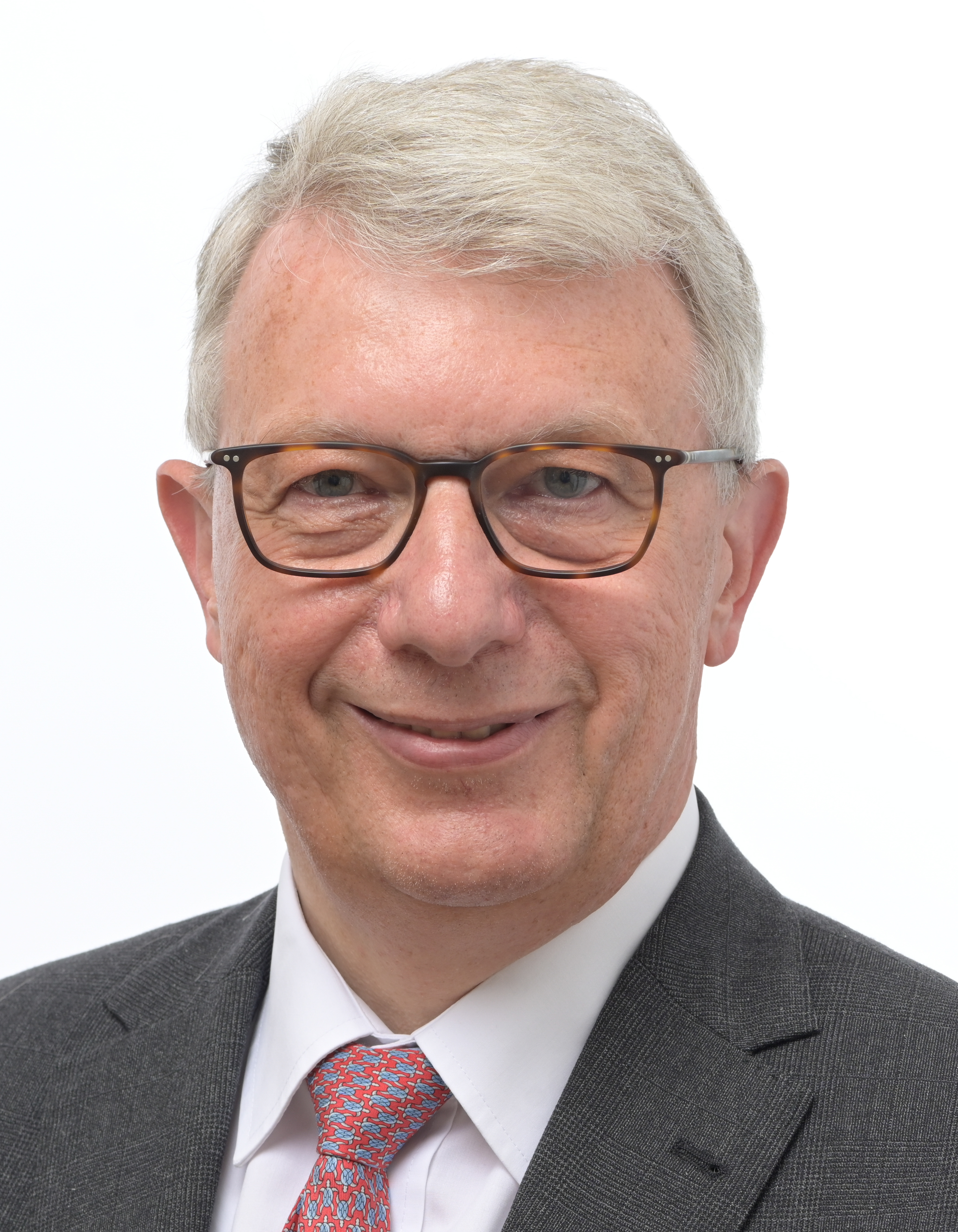
	First party	Second party	Third party
Leader	Isabel Wiseler-Santos Lima	Marc Angel	Charles Goerens
Party	CSV	LSAP	DP
Alliance	EPP	S&D	RE
Last election	2 seats, 21.1%	1 seat, 12.2%	2 seats, 21.4%
Seats won	2	1	1
Seat change	0	0	▼1
Popular vote	317,334	300,879	253,344
Percentage	22.9%	21.7%	18.3%
Swing	▲1.8pp	▲9.5pp	▼3.2pp
	Fourth party	Fifth party
Leader	Tilly Metz	Fernand Kartheiser
Party	Greens	ADR
Alliance	Greens/EFA	ECR
Last election	1 seat, 18.9%	0 seats, 10.0%
Seats won	1	1
Seat change	0	▲1
Popular vote	162,955	162,849
Percentage	11.8%	11.8%
Swing	▼7.1pp	▲1.7pp
- Results of the election by commune

The 2024 European Parliament elections in Luxembourg were held on 9 June 2024 as part of the 2024 European Parliament election. This was the first to take place after Brexit.

== Background ==
Along with Cyprus and Malta, Luxembourg is the smallest constituency electing 6 Members of the European Parliament.

== Opinion polls ==
No opinion polls were conducted for the European Parliament election in Luxembourg. The results of recent elections are shown in the absence of that.

Polling execution			Parties											
Polling firm	Fieldwork date	Sample size	DP Renew	CSV EPP	Greens G/EFA	LSAP S&D	ADR ECR	Pirate G/EFA	Lénk Left	Volt G/EFA	KPL	DK	Fokus	Others
2023 general election			19.1 (2)	29.3 (3)	8.3 (0)	18.2 (1)	9.6 (0)	6.7 (0)	3.6 (0)	0.2 (0)	0.5 (0)	1.4 (0)	2.6 (0)	—
2023 municipal elections			19.8 (1)	26.5 (2)	11.6 (1)	21.9 (2)	20.3 (0)							
2019 EP election			21.4 (2)	21.1 (2)	18.9 (1)	12.2 (1)	10.0 (0)	7.7 (0)	4.8 (0)	2.1 (0)	1.1 (0)	0.5 (0)	—	

== Results ==
The Alternative Democratic Reform Party won its first ever seat in a European Union election.

Party	Votes	%	Seats
Christian Social People's Party	317,334	22.91	2
Luxembourg Socialist Workers' Party	300,879	21.72	1
Democratic Party	253,344	18.29	1
The Greens	162,955	11.76	1
Alternative Democratic Reform Party	162,849	11.76	1
Pirate Party Luxembourg	68,085	4.92	0
The Left	43,701	3.15	0
Fokus	22,222	1.60	0
Volt Luxembourg	14,348	1.04	0
Communist Party of Luxembourg	13,368	0.97	0
We the People	11,838	0.85	0
The Conservatives	8,044	0.58	0
Together – The Bridge	6,172	0.45	0
Total	1,385,139	100.00	6
Valid votes	238,771	90.85	
Invalid/blank votes	24,058	9.15	
Total votes	262,829	100.00	
Registered voters/turnout	319,410	82.29	
Source: Government of Luxembourg
