= Roy Reding =

Luxembourgish lawyer and politician (born 1965)

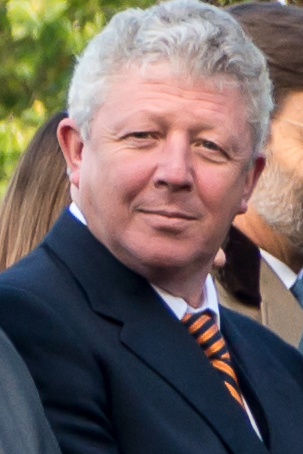
- Reding in October 2016

Member of the Chamber of Deputies
- In office 13 November 2013 – 24 October 2023
- Preceded by: Jacques-Yves Henckes
- Succeeded by: Tom Weidig
- Constituency: Centre

Personal details
- Born: Roy Yves Nico Reding; 17 July 1965 (age 61) Luxembourg City, Luxembourg
- Party: Liberté - Fräiheet! (since 2023)
- Other political affiliations: ADR (until 2023); LSAP
- Education: Paul Cézanne University (LL.B.); Robert Schuman University (LL.M.)

Roy Yves Nico Reding (born 17 July 1965) is a Luxembourgish lawyer, politician, and former vice-president of the ADR, as well as former treasurer of the Alliance of European Conservatives and Reformists (AECR), a centre-right eurosceptic European political party, of which the ADR is a member.

== Early life and education ==
Reding spent his childhood in Bech, a village near Echternach, and has lived in Fischbach, Mersch, and Folschette (near Rambrouch), with his current residence being in Luxembourg City. Reding has four children and is married to Karine Reuter, a former judge who is currently a notary in Pétange. Reding went to school in Echternach with, among others, the former Justice and Culture Minister Octavie Modert and the former Secretary-General of the Democratic Party Georges Gudenburg. Following the completion of his secondary education, Reding studied Law at Paul Cézanne University in Aix-en-Provence, whence he obtained a Bachelor of Laws. He then obtained a Master of Laws from Robert Schuman University in Strasbourg.

Having obtained his master's degree, Reding started work on 1 August 1989 as a solicitor at the Luxembourg bank BGL BNP Paribas. In May 1990, Reding received his official admission to the Luxembourg Bar, allowing him to open a chancery in 1993, namely Reding et Felten in Luxembourg City. After the two associates parted ways, Reding opened his own chancery in the city centre, located on rue de l'Eau. He retired as a lawyer in 2019 in order to be able to act more independently as an MP and not face any consequences from the Bar. He stated: "retiring as a lawyer gives me the possibility to talk freely on all subjects without fearing professional repercussions."

== Political career ==
=== Local politics ===
Reding's first became involved in politics at the age of 15, when he became a member of the LSAP and their youth organization JSL. He engaged actively in politics whilst at school. He was the elected school representative in the Conseil d'Education as well as chief editor of the school newspaper De Maulwuerf. During his time at university, he was president of the National Union of Luxembourgish Students (UNEL) as well as the president of the Socialist Students (Etudiants Socialistes). He also worked as a free-lance journalist for the Tageblatt during this time. In 1999, he was elected as a councilman in the Council of Fischbach, receiving the second largest share of the vote.

=== National politics ===
The trigger for Reding's entry into national politics was the Treaty establishing a Constitution for Europe, (commonly referred to as the European Constitution or as the Constitutional Treaty), against which Reding vehemently protested with the viewpoint that the government was manipulating voters with false statements and propaganda in order to get them to ratify the Treaty. Reding became politically active in the ADR following this, whose views he shared and for whom he ran for the since 2005 unoccupied seat in the Council of State of Luxembourg. At the National Congress of the ADR in 2006, Reding was voted into the position of Secretary-General.

During the parliamentary elections of 7 June 2009 and the 2009 European Parliament election, Reding ran for a seat in both the National and EU parliaments. He narrowly missed out on a seat in the national parliament by a couple of hundred votes, coming second on the ADR centre list behind Jacques-Yves Henckes. In the National Congress of 25 March 2012, Reding was voted into the position of Vice-President.

In the snap elections of October 2013, Reding reclaimed the centre seat for the ADR after Jacques-Yves Henckes left the party. On 13 November 2013, Reding was sworn in as a Member of Parliament. He became a member of the Parliamentary Commissions for Justice, Agriculture and Viticulture, Consumer Protection, Secondary Education, Media and Communication, and Research. He was also elected as a representative for Luxembourg in the Benelux Parliament. Reding was re-elected in the October 2018 elections, improving his vote share by 12.4% to a total of 6,319.

Reding is a presenter on the Luxembourgish Channel ".dok". Primarily, the socially dedicated lawyer presents his show "Vu Fall zu Fall" in which he answers complicated legal questions as well as reporting on interesting developments in the Judicial landscape of Luxembourg, along with his wife Karine Reuter. Reding also presents the show City Talk in which he discusses political themes about Luxembourg City with his guests.

== Re-Entry into Communal Politics ==
In the Communal Elections of October 2017, Reding was elected into the Communal Council of Luxembourg City. He sits as the sole representative of the ADR on the Council, and is a member of the Commission on Urban Development.

In December 2022, he was convicted of fraud after selling a property and failing to disclose to the buyer that part of it was legally uninhabitable. He was given a suspended 1-year prison sentence and a €50,000 fine. However, in June 2023, his conviction was overturned on appeal.
