= Michel Lemaire =

Luxembourgish politician (born 1988)

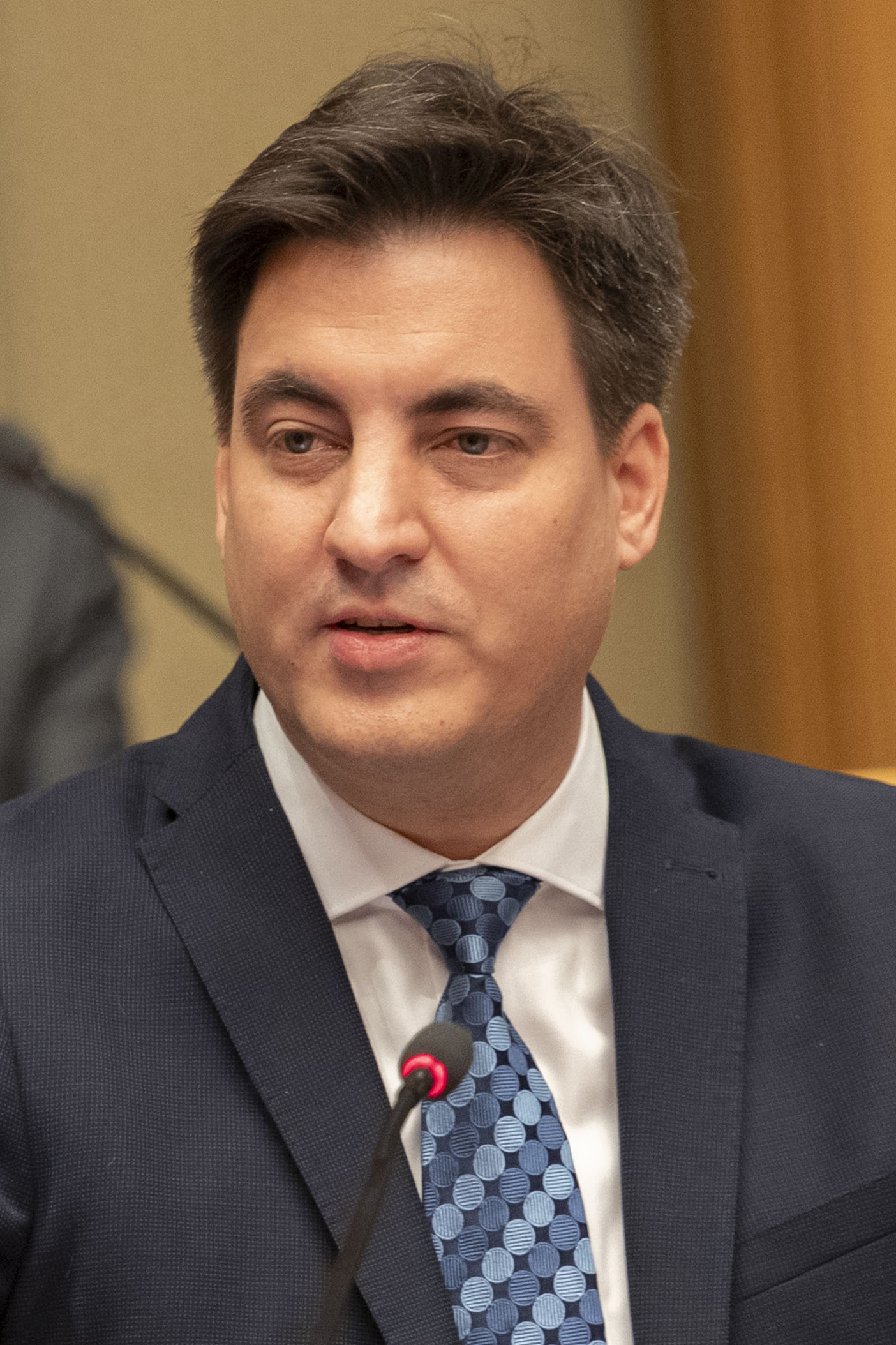
- Lemaire in 2025

Member of the Chamber of Deputies
- Incumbent
- Assumed office 20 November 2025
- Preceded by: Jeff Engelen
- Constituency: North

Personal details
- Born: 8 October 1988 (age 37)
- Party: Alternative Democratic Reform Party

Michel Lemaire (born 8 October 1988) is a Luxembourgish politician serving as a member of the Chamber of Deputies since 2025. From 2017 to 2022, he served as president of ADRenalin.
