= Joe Thein =

Luxembourgish politician

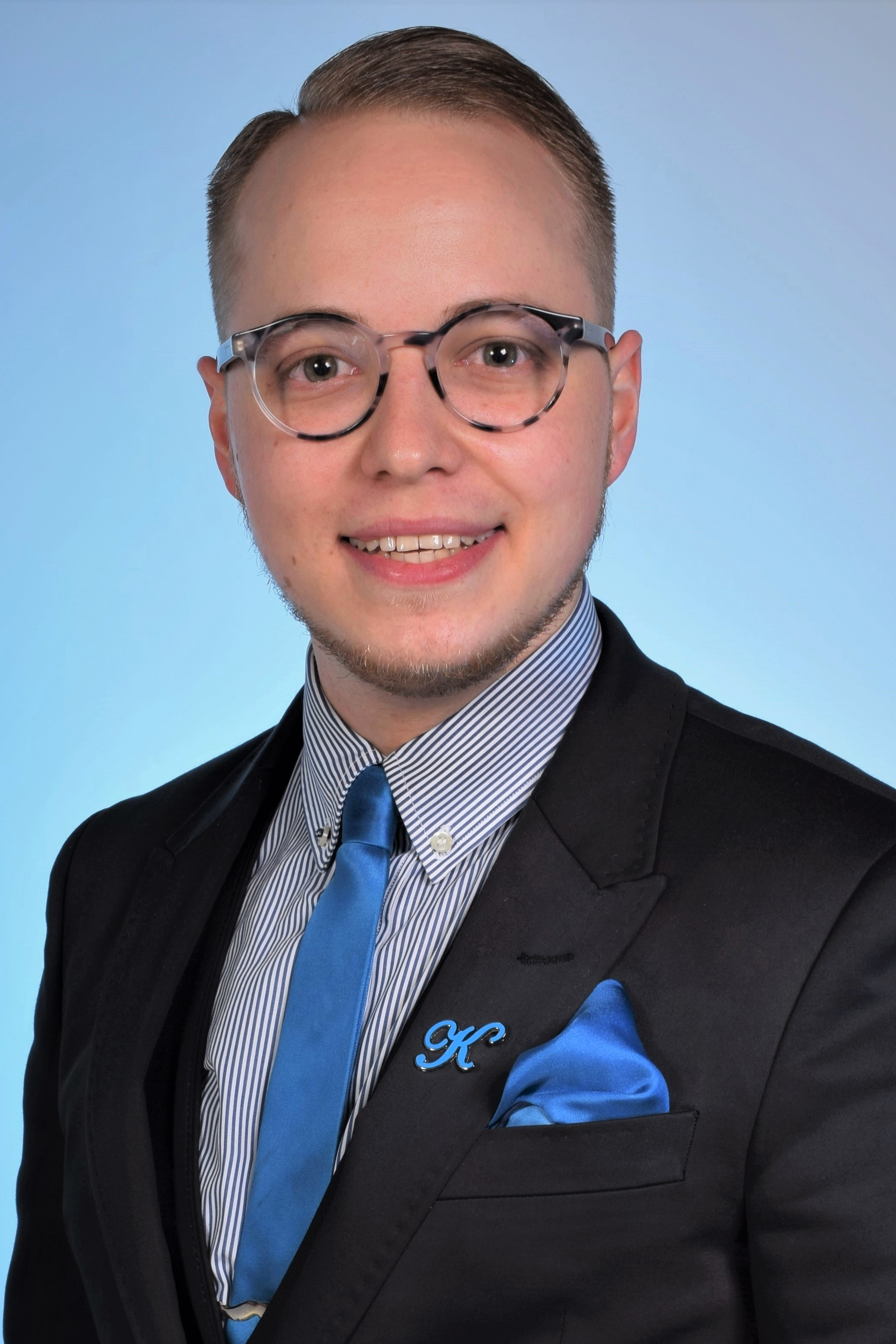
- Thein in 2017

Communal councillor of Pétange
- In office 2011–2017

Personal details
- Born: 17 July 1991 (age 35) Esch-sur-Alzette, Luxembourg
- Party: The Conservatives (since 2017)
- Other political affiliations: ADR (2008-2017)

Joe Thein (born 17 July 1991) is a Luxembourgish politician for The Conservatives who served as a communal councillor in Pétange from 2011 to 2017.

He lives in Lamadelaine in the commune of Pétange. He supports the philosophy of conservatism by Edmund Burke.

After obtaining his commercial diploma at the Lycée Technique Mathias Adam, he worked as a flight attendant at the Luxembourgish airline Luxair. Subsequently, he began studies in history at the University of Luxembourg. He is currently working as secretary of management.

== Political career ==
=== ADR ===
Thein was a member of ADR from 2008 to 2017. He joined on 14 July 2008 at the age of 16, and its youth organization in 2009.
After five years of vice-presidency, he was elected on 16 March 2015 in Luxembourg City as chairman of the youth organization adrenalin. He was also the vice-president of the ADR South region and local section of Pétange, represented in the national and executive board of the party.

In the local elections held on 9 October 2011 he ran at the age of 20 for a seat in the council of Pétange obtaining 403 voices (230 list voices) and the first and only seat for ADR, enabling the party's first local success in the municipality. At the general meeting of the Pétange section, he was designated as head of the list for the upcoming local elections on 8 October 2017.

In the Luxembourg General election, held on 20 October 2013, he ran for a seat in the Chamber of Deputies for the south, obtaining 5234 voices (3828 list voices), placing him fourth on the list.

At the congress of the European Young Conservatives in December 2016 in Brussels, he was elected vice-chairman of the board of the European conservative youth-organizations EYC.

In April 2012, Thein was banned from speaking in the lyceum, after students invited the politician as a speaker on the subject of multiculturalism. This led to criticism from the students and his party in the press. Thein himself spoke of a lack of political neutrality of the school administration and boycott.

In April 2014, Thein initiated a petition against the right of foreigners to vote, which was submitted and approved by the Petition Commission of the Chambre des Députés. The aim was, according to Thein, the promotion of Luxembourg's sovereignty and identity, as well as the integration policy in Luxembourg.

On 9 March 2017, after a disciplinary procedure, he was expelled from his party following a controversial "Like" on Facebook. Prior to the measure, the justice proclaimed that no prosecution would be initiated because of no evidence of hate speech. Yet, the party board voted for his exclusion. Soon after, he announced the possible founding of a "real conservative party."

=== déi Konservativ (The Conservatives) ===
On 21 March 2017, he founded a new political party in Luxembourg called déi Konservativ ("The Conservatives"), adding "d'Fräiheetspartei" (en. ("Freedomparty") as a name suffix in November 2021; he remains the party's chairman. On 10 April, he was elected to his political office at the extraordinary national congress of the party, and re-elected with all votes at the annual national congress on 7 January 2018 and confirmed since then.

In the local elections held on 9 October 2017 his party ran with a list in the municipality of Pétange, with Thein as head of list, obtaining 2.40% as a party result, with a personal vote of 550 voices (66 list voices).

On 29 January 2018 he was elected by the municipality council into the commission of integration for the political term 2017/2023.

In the Luxembourg General election held on 14 October 2018 his party ran with a list in the south, with Thein as head of list, obtaining 0.52% as party result, with a personal vote of 1,426 voices (266 list voices) placing him first on the list.

In the European Election held on 26 May 2019 his party ran with a list in the South, with Thein as head of list, obtaining 0.53% as party result, with a personal vote of 1,957 voices.

In the local elections held on 11 June 2023 his party déi Konservativ – d'Fräiheetspartei ran with a list, with Thein as head of list, in two municipalities and obtained 1,81% (2.278 list voices) in Pétange as well as 1,96% (3.283 list voices) in Differdange.

In the Luxembourg General election held on 8 October 2023, he was the head candidate of the list for the South, whose party is running in both districts North and South of the country.

Thein stood for election to the European Parliament in June 2024 but failed to win a seat, with only a low 1,899 votes cast in his favor, coming 63rd out of 81 candidates.

== Other ==
Thein describes himself as conservative, classically liberal and patriotic and is close to the Conservatism of Edmund Burke.

He is a sympathizer of AfD. In February 2016 he visited a eurosceptical congress of the party in Düsseldorf. Footage from the ARD broadcaster shows Thein with applause.

In 2016, Thein was portrayed in a short documentary of the documentary series routwäissgro of the film production Calach Films and Kollektiv 13, as well as with the support of the Film Fund Luxembourg and RTL Télé Lëtzebuerg, entitled "Meng Heemecht" and shown on national television RTL.

On 4 February 2018 an attack on Thein's family home occurred. A strong firecracker blew up several windows of Thein's house and party headquarters. A car was also damaged. The police initiated a criminal investigation into the case.

In October 2018, Thein initiated a police report against rapper Tun Tonnar (aka Turnup Tun), subsequently followed by a process in March 2019, for his song, entitled "FCK LXB". In the song, the rapper criticizes several Luxembourgish right-wing politicians, including Thein as well as his party Déi Konservativ. During the process in the district court of Luxembourg on 28 March, Thein demanded €5.000 as damages because of public injury to reputation and insult. The verdict was announced in May 2019, which was in favour of Tonnar. The court cited the need to continue to respect artistic freedoms.

== Personal life ==
Thein is openly homosexual. He came officially out as gay in February 2014, via his blog and Facebook.
