= Alexandra Schoos =

Luxembourgish politician (born 1988)

The Honourable Alexandra Schoos
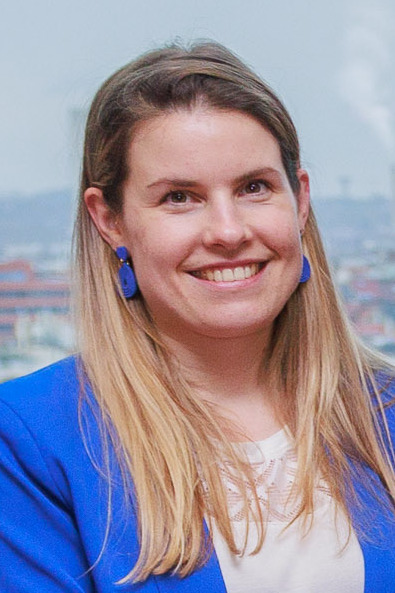
- Schoos in 2024

President of the Alternative Democratic Reform Party
- Incumbent
- Assumed office 17 March 2024
- Preceded by: Fred Keup

Member of the Chamber of Deputies
- Incumbent
- Assumed office 24 October 2023
- Constituency: East

Personal details
- Born: 13 May 1988 (age 37)
- Party: Alternative Democratic Reform Party

Alexandra Schoos (born 13 May 1988) is a Luxembourgish politician of the Alternative Democratic Reform Party who was elected member of the Chamber of Deputies in 2023. Since 2024, she has served as leader of the party. She is the daughter of Jean Schoos, who was leader of the party from 2013 to 2022.
