= 2023 Luxembourg general election =

- 8 October 2023
- All 60 seats in the Chamber of Deputies; 31 seats needed for a majority
- Turnout: 87.20% (▼2.46pp)
| Party | Leader | Vote % | Seats | +/– |
|---|---|---|---|---|
| CSV | Luc Frieden | 29.80 | 21 | 0 |
| DP | Xavier Bettel | 19.13 | 14 | +2 |
| LSAP | Paulette Lenert | 18.18 | 11 | +1 |
| ADR | Fred Keup | 9.54 | 5 | +1 |
| Greens | Sam Tanson | 8.32 | 4 | −5 |
| Pirates | Sven Clement | 6.66 | 3 | +1 |
| The Left | Collective leadership (Note: The Left has no singular leader and did not put forward a lead candidate for Prime Minister; their lead candidates at the constituency level were: David Wagner and Ana Correia da Veiga (Centre); Marc Baum, Carole Thoma, Gary Diderich and Line Wies (South); Pascal Alff and Madeleine Mireille Abega Ngoton (North); Laurent Fisch and Adela Fuentes (East)) | 3.64 | 2 | 0 |
This lists parties that won seats. See the complete results below.
Most voted-for party by municipality and constituency
| Prime Minister before | Prime Minister after |
|---|---|
| Xavier Bettel; DP | Luc Frieden; CSV |

General elections were held in Luxembourg on 8 October 2023 to elect all 60 seats of the Chamber of Deputies.

The incumbent Bettel II Government was a coalition of the Democratic Party (DP), the Luxembourg Socialist Workers' Party (LSAP) and The Greens.

== Electoral system ==
The 60 members of the Chamber of Deputies are elected by proportional representation in four multi-member constituencies; nine in North constituency, seven in East, 23 in South and 21 in Centre. Voters can vote for a party list or cast multiple votes for as many candidates as there are seats. Seat allocation is calculated in accordance with the Hagenbach-Bischoff quota.

Only Luxembourgish citizens may vote in general elections. A proposal to extend voting rights to foreigners who have lived in Luxembourg for at least ten years and have previously voted in a European or local election in Luxembourg, was rejected in a 2015 referendum. Voting is mandatory for eligible Luxembourg citizens who live in Luxembourg and are under 75 years of age. Luxembourg citizens who live abroad may vote by post at the commune in which they most recently lived in Luxembourg. Luxembourg citizens who were born in Luxembourg but have never lived there may vote by post at the commune in which they were born. Luxembourg citizens who were not born in Luxembourg and have never lived there may vote by post at the commune of Luxembourg City.

== Contesting parties ==
| List no. | Name | Abbr. | Lead candidate | Ideology | Political position | Last election | | Notes |
| List no. | Name | Abbr. | Lead candidate | Ideology | Political position | % | Seats | Notes |
|---|---|---|---|---|---|---|---|---|
| 1 | Luxembourg Socialist Workers' Party; Lëtzebuerger Sozialistesch Aarbechterpartei | LSAP | Paulette Lenert | Social democracy | Centre-left | 17.60 | 10 / 60 | |
| 2 | Democratic Party; Demokratesch Partei | DP | Xavier Bettel | Liberalism | Centre to centre-right | 16.91 | 12 / 60 | |
| 3 | The Greens; Déi Gréng | DG | Sam Tanson | Green politics | Centre-left | 15.12 | 9 / 60 | |
| 4 | Christian Social People's Party; Chrëschtlech Sozial Vollekspartei | CSV | Luc Frieden | Christian democracy | Centre to centre-right | 28.31 | 21 / 60 | |
| 5 | The Left; Déi Lénk | DL | David Wagner | Democratic socialism | Left-wing | 5.48 | 2 / 60 | |
| 6 | Alternative Democratic Reform Party; Alternativ Demokratesch Reformpartei | ADR | Fred Keup | National conservatism | Right-wing to far-right | 8.28 | 4 / 60 | |
| 7 | Pirate Party Luxembourg; Piratepartei Lëtzebuerg | PPLU | Sven Clement | Pirate politics | | 6.45 | 2 / 60 | |
| 9 | Focus; Fokus | FOK | Frank Engel | Pragmatism | Centre | New | | |
| 10 | Volt Luxembourg; Volt Lëtzebuerg | VOLT | None | European federalism | Centre to centre-left | New | | Only presenting lists in the South and East constituencies |
| 11 | Communist Party of Luxembourg; Kommunistesch Partei vu Lëtzebuerg | KPL | Ali Ruckert | Communism | Far-left | 1.27 | 0 / 60 | Only presenting lists in the South, East and Centre constituencies |
| 12 | Liberté - Fräiheet! Liberté - Fräiheet! | LF | Roy Reding | Right-wing populism | Right-wing to far-right | New | | |
| 13 | The Conservatives; Déi Konservativ | DK | Joe Thein | Conservatism | Centre-right to right-wing | 0.27 | 0 / 60 | Only presenting lists in the South and North constituencies |

== Opinion polls ==
=== Voting intention ===
| Fieldwork date | Polling firm | CSV | LSAP | DP | DG | ADR | PPLU | DL | KPL | Dem. | DK | Volt | Fokus |
|---|---|---|---|---|---|---|---|---|---|---|---|---|---|
| 8 Oct 2023 | Election | 29.22% | 18.92% | 18.70% | 8.55% | 9.27% | 6.74% | 3.93% | 0.64% | – | 0.23% | 0.19% | 2.49% |
| 7–16 Aug 2023 | ILRES | 28.3% | 19.8% | 17.4% | 10.7% | 6.9% | 9.9% | 5% | 0.4% | – | 0.1% | 0.3% | 1.1% |
| 11 Jun 2023 | Municipal elections | 26.06% | 21.30% | 20.64% | 12.69% | 3.22% | 3.98% | 3.22% | 0.40% | – | 0.18% | – | 0.84% |
| 23 Mar − 6 Apr 2023 | TNS | 27.1% | 17.9% | 17.1% | 12.8% | 7.5% | 10.0% | 4.3% | 0.5% | 0.3% | 0.1% | 0.4% | 2.0% |
| 14−28 Nov 2022 | TNS | 23.3% | 20.7% | 18.4% | 12.1% | 7.7% | 9.6% | 5.8% | 0.5% | 0.3% | 0.1% | 0.1% | 1.5% |
| 24 May − 7 Jun 2022 | TNS | 23.0% | 18.0% | 18.1% | 13.7% | 7.6% | 9.7% | 5.6% | 0.4% | 0.3% | 0.2% | 0.5% | 2.9% |
| 11−19 Nov 2021 | TNS | 21.6% | 20.2% | 16.2% | 12.4% | 11.3% | 11.1% | 5.0% | 0.8% | 0.6% | 0.5% | 0.3% | – |
| 9−21 Jun 2021 | TNS | 24.6% | 17.8% | 19.3% | 13.4% | 7.6% | 8.0% | 7.0% | 1.0% | 0.6% | 0.2% | 0.5% | – |
| 10–24 Nov 2020 | TNS | 25.7% | 19.8% | 19.9% | 11.5% | 9.6% | 5.9% | 5.8% | 0.9% | 0.5% | 0.3% | 0.1% | – |
| 4–24 Jun 2020 | TNS | 27.5% | 16.4% | 20.6% | 13.4% | 8.2% | 4.8% | 7.3% | 1.1% | 0.3% | 0.2% | – | – |
| 14–23 Nov 2019 | TNS | 30.1% | 15.0% | 16.6% | 15.9% | 10.4% | 5.4% | 5.5% | 0.8% | 0.1% | 0.2% | – | – |
| 14 Oct 2018 | Election | 28.31% | 17.60% | 16.91% | 15.12% | 8.28% | 6.45% | 5.48% | 1.27% | 0.29% | 0.27% | – | – |

=== Seat projections ===
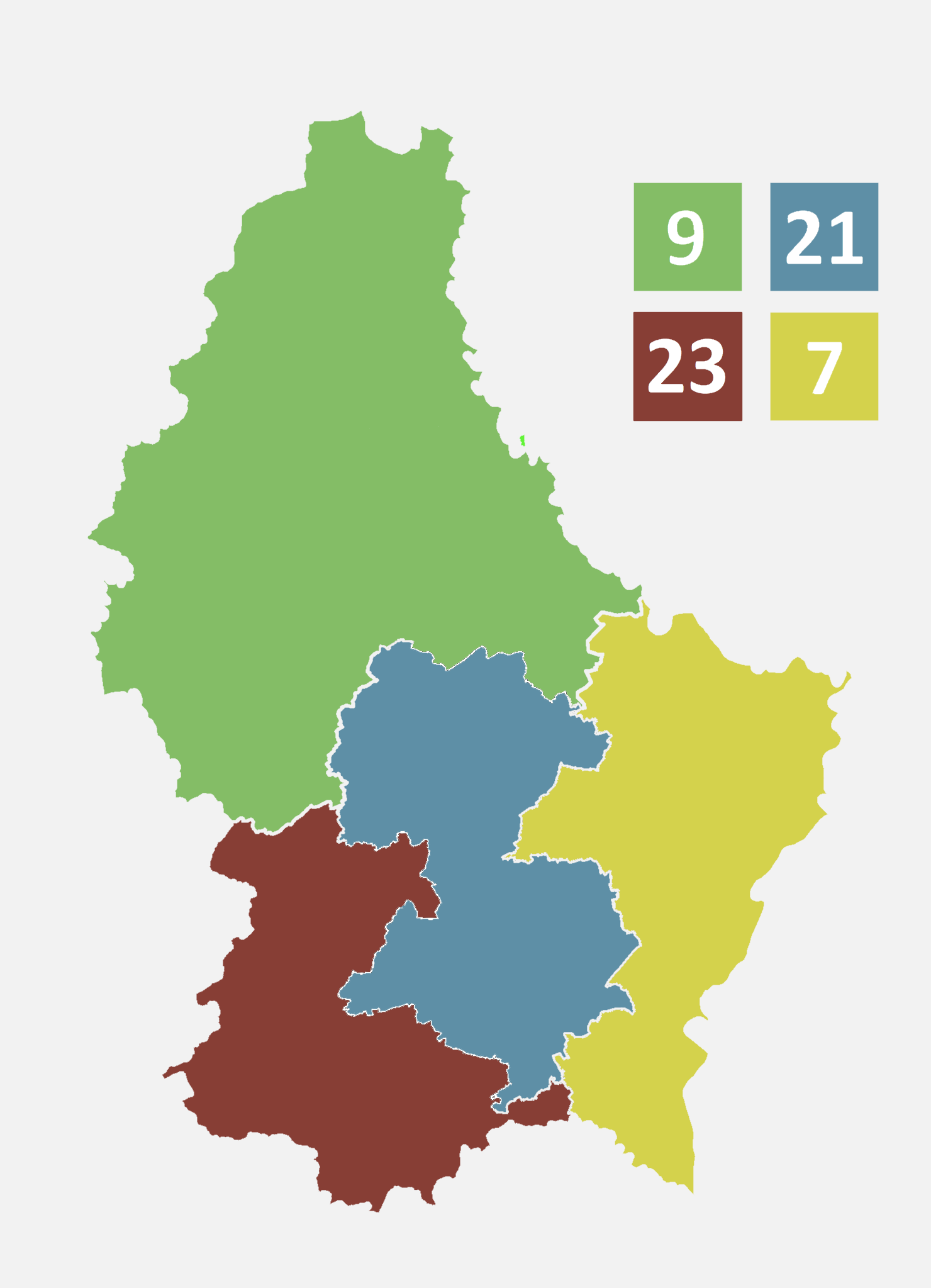
Map of Luxembourg's constituencies with number of seats

| Fieldwork date | Polling firm | CSV | DP | LSAP | DG | ADR | PPLU | DL | Gov. |
|---|---|---|---|---|---|---|---|---|---|
| 8 Oct 2023 | Election | 21 | 14 | 11 | 4 | 5 | 3 | 2 | 29 |
| 7–16 Aug 2023 | ILRES | 19 | 11 | 13 | 7 | 3 | 5 | 2 | 31 |
| 23 Mar − 6 Apr 2023 | TNS | 17 | 11 | 12 | 8 | 4 | 6 | 2 | 31 |
| 14−28 Nov 2022 | TNS | 15 | 12 | 13 | 8 | 4 | 6 | 2 | 33 |
| 24 May − 7 Jun 2022 | TNS | 16 | 12 | 12 | 8 | 4 | 6 | 2 | 32 |
| 11−19 Nov 2021 | TNS | 15 | 9 | 12 | 8 | 7 | 7 | 2 | 29 |
| 9−21 Jun 2021 | TNS | 17 | 13 | 11 | 8 | 4 | 4 | 3 | 32 |
| 10–24 Nov 2020 | TNS | 17 | 14 | 12 | 8 | 5 | 2 | 2 | 34 |
| 4–24 Jun 2020 | TNS | 19 | 15 | 10 | 8 | 4 | 1 | 3 | 33 |
| 14–23 Dec 2019 | TNS | 20 | 11 | 9 | 10 | 6 | 2 | 2 | 30 |
| 14 Oct 2018 | Election | 21 | 12 | 10 | 9 | 4 | 2 | 2 | 31 |

== Results ==
| Party | Raw results | | Weighted results (Note: Calculated separately for each constituency (rounded to the nearest whole number) using the formula: $$\mbox{party's} \; \mbox{votes} \times \frac{\mbox{total} \; \mbox{of} \; \mbox{valid} \; \mbox{ballots}}{\mbox{total} \; \mbox{of} \; \mbox{valid} \; \mbox{votes}}$$) | | Seats | +/– |
| Party | Votes | % | Votes | % | Seats | +/– |
|---|---|---|---|---|---|---|
| Christian Social People's Party | 1,099,427 | 29.21 | 68,948 | 29.80 | 21 | 0 |
| Luxembourg Socialist Workers' Party | 711,890 | 18.91 | 42,068 | 18.18 | 11 | +1 |
| Democratic Party | 703,833 | 18.70 | 44,262 | 19.13 | 14 | +2 |
| Alternative Democratic Reform Party | 348,990 | 9.27 | 22,078 | 9.54 | 5 | +1 |
| The Greens | 321,895 | 8.55 | 19,239 | 8.32 | 4 | –5 |
| Pirate Party Luxembourg | 253,554 | 6.74 | 15,408 | 6.66 | 3 | +1 |
| The Left | 147,839 | 3.93 | 8,414 | 3.64 | 2 | 0 |
| Fokus | 93,839 | 2.49 | 5,955 | 2.57 | 0 | New |
| Liberté - Fräiheet! | 42,643 | 1.13 | 2,834 | 1.23 | 0 | New |
| Communist Party of Luxembourg | 24,275 | 0.64 | 1,257 | 0.54 | 0 | 0 |
| The Conservatives | 8,494 | 0.23 | 495 | 0.21 | 0 | 0 |
| Volt Luxembourg | 7,001 | 0.19 | 386 | 0.17 | 0 | New |
| Total | 3,763,680 | 100.00 | 231,344 | 100.00 | 60 | 0 |
| Valid votes | 231,344 | 92.55 | | | | |
| Invalid votes | 10,735 | 4.29 | | | | |
| Blank votes | 7,889 | 3.16 | | | | |
| Total votes | 249,968 | 100.00 | | | | |
| Registered voters/turnout | 286,739 | 87.18 | | | | |
Source: Government of Luxembourg

=== Votes by constituency ===
| Constituency | CSV | | LSAP | | DP | | ADR | | Gréng | | PPL | | Lénk | | Fokus | | LF | | KPL | | DK | | Volt | |
|---|---|---|---|---|---|---|---|---|---|---|---|---|---|---|---|---|---|---|---|---|---|---|---|---|
| Centre | 376,078 | 29.9 | 148,051 | 11.8 | 317,200 | 25.3 | 82,230 | 6.5 | 144,833 | 11.5 | 81,668 | 6.5 | 49,481 | 3.9 | 34,333 | 2.7 | 16,535 | 1.3 | 5,664 | 0.5 | – | – | – | – |
| East | 69,210 | 30.6 | 39,061 | 17.3 | 51,816 | 22.9 | 21,407 | 9.5 | 17,277 | 7.6 | 11,072 | 4.9 | 5,686 | 2.5 | 5,685 | 2.5 | 3,449 | 1.5 | 896 | 0.4 | – | – | 553 | 0.2 |
| North | 124,864 | 33.1 | 57,693 | 15.3 | 66,224 | 17.5 | 45,430 | 12.0 | 25,193 | 6.7 | 29,110 | 7.7 | 9,758 | 2.6 | 11,855 | 3.1 | 5,925 | 1.6 | – | – | 1,370 | 0.4 | – | – |
| South | 529,275 | 27.8 | 467,085 | 24.5 | 268,593 | 14.1 | 199,923 | 10.5 | 134,592 | 7.1 | 131,704 | 6.9 | 82,914 | 4.4 | 41,966 | 2.2 | 16,734 | 0.9 | 17,715 | 0.9 | 7,124 | 0.4 | 6,448 | 0.3 |

=== Seats by constituency ===
| Constituency | Total seats | Seats won | | | | | | |
| Constituency | Total seats | CSV | LSAP | DP | ADR | Gréng | PPL | Lénk |
|---|---|---|---|---|---|---|---|---|
| Centre | 21 | 7 | 3 | 6 | 1 | 2 | 1 | 1 |
| East | 7 | 3 | 1 | 2 | 1 | | | |
| North | 9 | 4 | 1 | 2 | 1 | | 1 | |
| South | 23 | 7 | 6 | 4 | 2 | 2 | 1 | 1 |

== Government formation ==
On 9 October 2023 Grand Duke Henri appointed Luc Frieden as government formateur with the intention that Frieden would become the next Prime Minister. The CSV leader began negotiations with outgoing Prime Minister Xavier Bettel and his DP. Bettel expressed his willingness to participate in government, though not as Prime Minister.

On 13 November Frieden announced a coalition agreement between the CSV and DP. Bettel led the DP's delegation to coalition negotiations, while the CSV delegation was led by party president Claude Wiseler. Frieden stated that he expected to take office by the end of the week following the announcement. The new cabinet was sworn in by the Grand Duke and Frieden assumed the office of Prime Minister on 17 November. The LSAP sat in opposition for the first time since the 1999 election.
