= ADRenalin (Luxembourg) =

Political Party

ADRenalin, the young ADR ADRenalin, déi jonk ADR
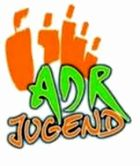
- ADR-Jugend Logo 1999–2008
- President: Maksymilian Woroszylo
- Vice President: Alex Rasquin
- Secretary General: Kathrin Wolff
- Treasurer: Kevin Serafini
- Founded: 17 July 1999 (as ADR Youth)
- Preceded by: ADR Youth
- Headquarters: 22, rue de l'eau L-1449 Luxembourg City
- Ideology: Conservatism; Classical liberalism
- Mother party: Alternative Democratic Reform Party
- European affiliation: European Young Conservatives
- Website: www.adr.lu/ADRenalin

ADRenalin, the young ADR (Luxembourgish: ADRenalin, déi jonk ADR) is the youth wing of the Alternative Democratic Reform Party (ADR), a conservative political party in Luxembourg.

Founded under the original name ADR Youth (Luxembourgish: ADR-Jugend) in 1999, the organization on 23 December 2008 adopted its current name. Its members are aged between 18 & 35.

== Presidents ==
- Christian Schaack (1999-2005)
- Tania Gibéryen (2006-2007)
- Joëlle Giannotte (2008–2009)
- Andy Maar (2010–2011)
- Joëlle Giannotte (2012–2013)
- Joe Thein (2015-2016)
- Joëlle Giannotte (2016–2017)
- Michel Lemaire (2017–2022)
- Maksymilian Woroszylo (current)
