= Jean Colombera =

Luxembourgish physician and politician

Jean Colombera (born 2 February 1954 in Esch-sur-Alzette) is a Luxembourgish physician and politician of the Alternative Democratic Reform Party. He was a member of the Chamber of Deputies from 1999 to 2012, representing the Nord constituency.

Born in Esch-sur-Alzette, Colombera is an Italian Luxembourger. He was formerly an Italian citizen, but gained Luxembourgish citizenship in 1999. Originally a Green, after gaining citizenship (a condition for being a deputy), Colombera asked Jean-Pierre Koepp if the ADR had a spare slot on their list in Nord, in which his hometown of Vichten is located.

In the 1999 election, Colombera was elected, narrowly finished second (behind Koepp) on the ADR's list, with two being elected. Colombera lost his seat in 2004, as the ADR lost its second seat in Nord and Colombera once again came second, again behind Koepp. He regained his seat in the 2009 election, after Koepp retired, allowing Colombera to re-enter the Chamber despite the ADR falling to fifth place in the constituency.

Colombera is a campaigner in favour of legalising medical cannabis. He is head of the Francophone Union for Cannabinoids in Medicine (French: Union Francophone pour les Cannabinoïdes en Médecine). He is under investigation for prescribing cannabinoids to his patients, under Luxembourg's Narcotics Act.
