= Fred Keup =

Luxembourgish politician

The Honourable Fred Keup
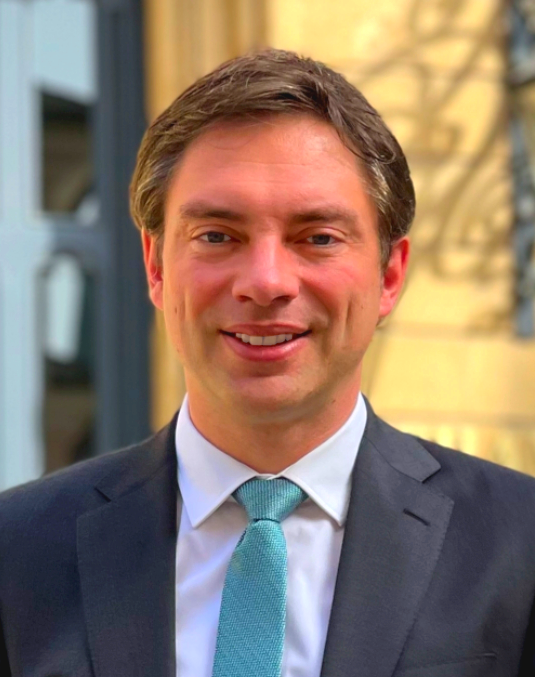

President of the Alternative Democratic Reform Party
- In office 3 March 2022 – 17 March 2024
- Preceded by: Jean Schoos
- Succeeded by: Alexandra Schoos

Member of the Chamber of Deputies
- Incumbent
- Assumed office 14 October 2020
- Preceded by: Gast Gybérien
- Constituency: South

Personal details
- Born: Frédéric Jean Keup; 15 May 1980 (age 45) Luxembourg City, Luxembourg
- Party: Luxembourgish; Alternative Democratic Reform Party

Frédéric Jean Keup (born 15 May 1980) is a Luxembourgish politician of the Alternative Democratic Reform Party (ADR) who has served as a member of the Chamber of Deputies since 2020. Since October 2023 he has been leader of the ADR parliamentary group.

== Life ==
Keup grew up in Kehlen and currently lives in Mamer. He is married and the father of two children. After his secondary school education at the Lycée Michel Rodange, he studied geography at the University of Strasbourg in France. From 2003 onwards he had taught geography and civil education in high school.

== Referendum 2015 ==
In the 2015 Luxembourg constitutional referendum, Fred Keup and a friend of his, Steve Kodesch, started a Facebook page publicly opposing the government and much of the establishment's wish to give foreigners the right to vote in the national elections. As the page become very popular, they established a political pressure group called "Nee2015". During the campaign, Fred Keup was seen as the spokesman of the "no camp" (fr: Porte-parole du camp du "non") and "the leading head of the no campaign". A highlight of the intense campaign was a public debate moderated by Radio RTL Luxembourg between Fred Keup and Laura Zuccoli. After the referendum (which ended with 79% against the right for foreigners to vote in national elections), the group renamed itself “Wee2050” with a focus on supporting the Luxembourgish language, which they believe are endangered, and the rapid economic growth in Luxembourg. Keup has also expressed his support for the Monarchy of Luxembourg. Fred Keup locates himself as a representative of the political center (“Vertieder vun der politescher Mëtt”), a claim which he bases on the results of the 2015 referendum. The magazine Forum claims that the fusion between Keup's Wee 2050 and the ADR resulted in the latter becoming a right-wing populist party.

== Politics ==
In the 2018 general election, Keup ran on the ADR's list in the South constituency, coming third on the list and failing to be elected directly. After Gaston Gibéryen's retirement from politics and resignation from the Chamber in 2020, Keup took his seat and was sworn in as a deputy on 14 October 2020. In the 2023 general election, Keup was the ADR's national lead candidate and won reelection, coming first on his list. The ADR campaign and Keup's style were described as right-wing populist by Luxembourgish media, as it focused on the alleged disappearance of the Luxembourgish language, culture war and fear of foreigners. Keup's way of dealing with party members who had used right-wing extremist symbolism was also criticized, as he failed to act and refused to acknowledge the documented symbols.

Keup was president of the ADR from March 2022 to March 2024. In his speech at the party's national congress, he said he felt one should not fill two offices. He was succeeded by Alexandra Schoos, who was elected to the Chamber in 2023. Keup's rhetoric at this congress has been called extreme and compared to that of Donald Trump and members of the German AfD who were at the 2023 Potsdam far-right meeting. He warned of "a rosy dream, a woke world without the nation of Luxembourg" and socialism which in his eyes would enable "mass-migration" into Europe.

== Other interests ==
Fred Keup is the president of the football club FC Kehlen and was a board member of the Actioun Lëtzebuergesch .
