= Tom Weidig =

Luxembourgish politician (born 1972)

The Honourable Tom Weidig
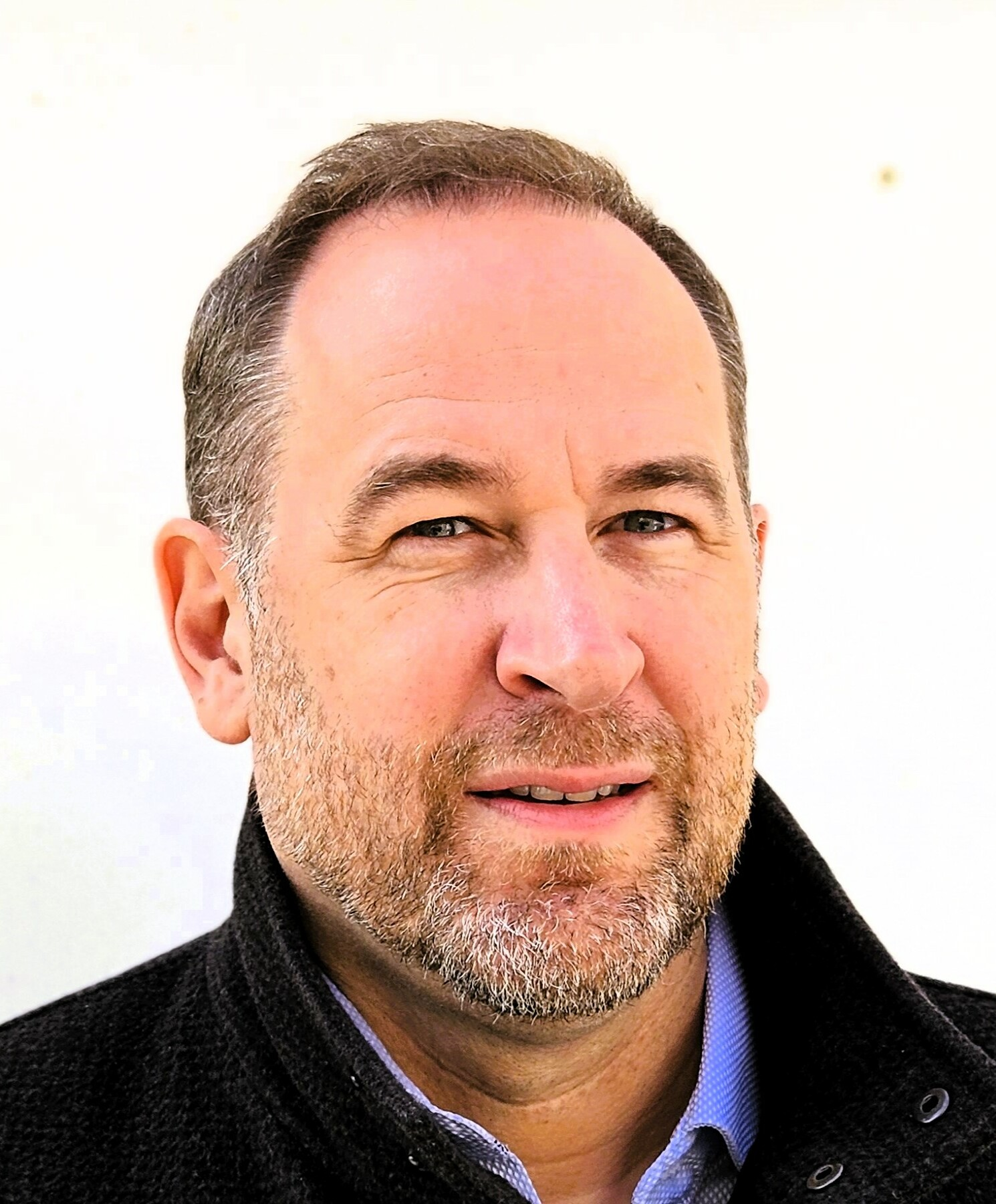

Member of the Chamber of Deputies
- Incumbent
- Assumed office 24 October 2023
- Constituency: Centre

Personal details
- Born: 9 December 1972 (age 53) Esch-sur-Alzette, Luxembourg

Tom Weidig (born 9 December 1972) is a Luxembourgish politician. He has served as a Member of the Chamber of Deputies from Centre since 2023, as a representative of the right-wing Alternative Democratic Reform Party (ADR). He supports the promotion of the Luxembourgish language.

In February 2025, Weidig received a written warning from his party after he liked a Facebook comment that was described as being anti-LGBTQ+. He issued an apology, but also insisted his actions had been misunderstood.

== Early life and education ==
Weidig was born and brought up in Esch-sur-Alzette. His parents were from Grevenmacher. As a teenager, he represented Luxembourg at the World Junior Chess Championship. He graduated from Imperial College London in 1996 with a Master of Science degree in Theoretical Physics, and earned his doctorate from Durham University in 1999. He was then a postdoc at UMIST, and in 2001 a visiting scholar at Trinity College, Cambridge.

== Career ==
Weidig has worked in the finance and venture capital industries.

== Personal life and public image ==
Weidig, who developed a stutter in early childhood, has a strong interest in the science behind stuttering. He was a board member of the British Stammering Association from 1995 to 1999.

In a July 2026 Ilres poll, with 75% name recognition, Weidig ranked as the least popular of all Luxembourgish politicians tested, with an average score of 9.4%.
