= Frank Engel (politician) =

Luxembourgish politician

Frank Engel MEP
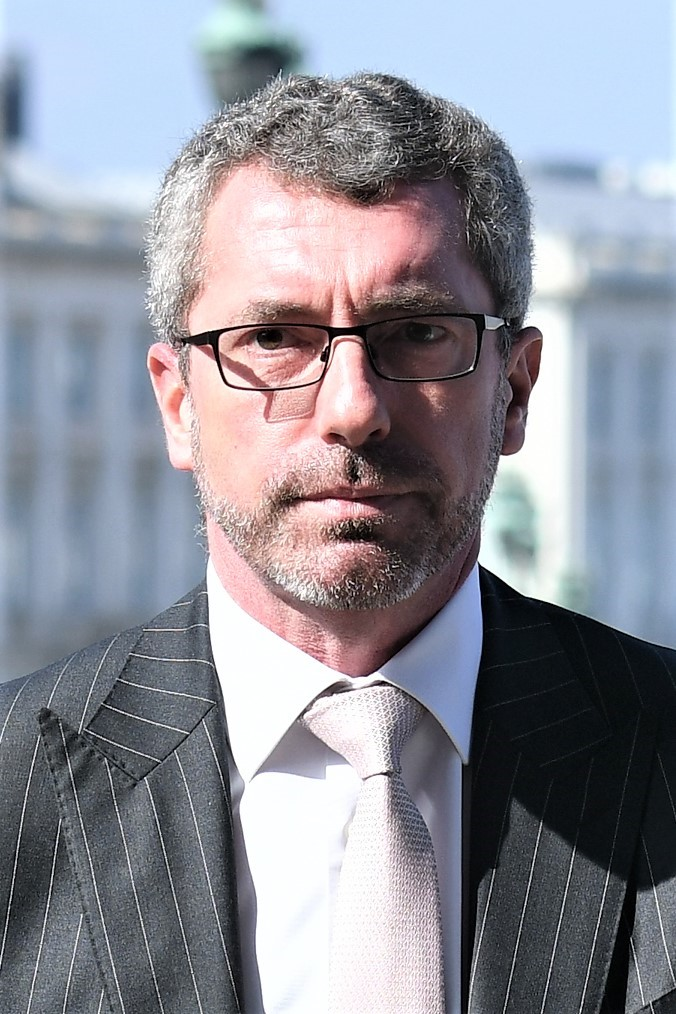

Member of the European Parliament
- In office 1 July 2009 – 1 July 2019
- Constituency: Luxembourg

Personal details
- Born: 10 May 1975 (age 50) Luxembourg City, Luxembourg
- Party: EU; European People's Party; Luxembourgish; Christian Social People's Party (until 2022); Fokus (since 2022)

Frank Engel (born 10 May 1975) is a Luxembourgish politician and a former Member of the European Parliament (MEP) from Luxembourg. He was a member of the Christian Social People's Party until 2022, part of the European People's Party.

== Background ==
Frank Engel completed his primary and secondary education in Diekirch, Luxembourg. At this time, he was a member of the "Gréng Alternativ Partei" (green party) and was active in the student organisation UNEL, where he was part of the national buro. He studied law at the Université libre de Bruxelles and received a maîtrise in private law from the Université de Metz. During his studies he became a member of the national committee of CSJ, the youth wing of CSV and was the president of several youth organisations, such as the National Union of Students, the National Youth Council and the European Federation of Christian Democrat Students (United Students for Europe).

After working as an independent consultant, he became the Editor in chief of CODEX, which is a website offering legal information. In 1999 he joined Jacques Santer's cabinet in the European Parliament and in 2001 he became the Secretary General of the CSV parliamentary group. He held the position until 2009, when he stood for the European elections for the first time and was elected to the European Parliament.

== Political career ==
Engel is the youngest MEP from his country and the head of the Luxembourgish EPP delegation.

At the European Parliament, he participates in the following committees:

- Committee on Civil Liberties, Justice and Home Affairs (LIBE) - member
- Committee for Economy and Monetary Affairs (ECON) - substitute member
- Committee on the Organised Crime, Corruption and Money Laundering (CRIM) - substitute member

He is also active in the following delegations:

- Delegation for Relations with the Pan-African Parliament - member
- Delegation to the ACP-EU Joint Parliamentary Assembly - member
- Delegation for Relations with the Korean Peninsula - substitute member

Previously, he has been a member of the Employment and Social Affairs Committee (EMPL), of the Special Committee on the Financial, Economic and Social Crisis (CRIS) and of the Special Committee on the Policy Challenges and Budgetary Resources for a sustainable European Union after 2013 (SURE).

He has written three books on European issues: the 'Europa in der großen Krise Ein Drama in drei Akten' ('Europe in the Great Crisis - A Drama in Three Acts') in 2009, 'Die Schulden überwinden - Ein Haushalt für den Euro' ('Overcome the debt - A budget for the euro') in 2012 and 'Projet de Manifeste pour les États-Unis d'Europe' ('Manifesto for a United States of Europe') in 2013.

== Other activities ==
He has also contributed to the book "Europe's Next Avoidable War: Nagorno-Karabakh" with the chapter "The Karabakh Dilemma: Right to Self-Determination, Imperative of Territorial Integrity, or a Caucasian New Deal?".

== Controversy ==
In February 2018, Engel went to Nagorno-Karabakh as part of a so-called friendship group with three other MEPs to observe a referendum vote on changes to the constitution. The European Parliament later said Engel's visit undermined the official position of the EU, which did not recognize the holding of a referendum in Nagorno-Karabakh as it does not formally recognize the territory.

Engel who is the substitute member of the Committee on the Organised Crime, Corruption and Money Laundering (CRIM) of the EP and who was formerly at the forefront of the fight against corruption, resigned from the position of the presidency of the Luxembourgian Christian Social People's Party (CSV) on 19 March 2021 due to a suspicion of corruption. The lawsuit, which involves restitution of benefits as well as an alleged sham employment relationship, began in October 2021.
