= The Conservatives (Luxembourg) =

The Conservatives Déi Konservativ
- Abbreviation: DK
- President: Joe Thein
- General Secretary: Pierrette Heintz
- Founded: 21 March 2017
- Split from: Alternative Democratic Reform Party
- Headquarters: 3, op de Gehren, L-4888 Rolleng
- Membership (2018): ~100
- Ideology: Conservatism; National conservatism Economic liberalism Soft Euroscepticism
- Political position: Right-wing
- Colours: Light blue
- Chamber of Deputies: 0 / 60
- European Parliament: 0 / 6
- Local councils: 0 / 722

Website
- déikonservativ.lu

The Conservatives (Luxembourgish: Déi Konservativ; French: Les Conservateurs; German: Die Konservativen) are a Luxembourgish political party that was founded on 21 March 2017 in the municipality of Pétange.

According to the founding statute of The Conservatives, they understand themselves as a party on a conservative and patriotic basis. According to the basic program, the party sees itself connected with the political philosophy of the state philosopher and politician Edmund Burke.

The party president is the former Alternative Democratic Reform Party (ADR) politician Joe Thein, who after being expelled from the ADR, started his own party.

At the extraordinary national congress of 10 April 2017, the party statutes and basic program were adopted, as well as the party committee was elected. Joe Thein was elected as national president.

In the 2017 communal elections, the party ran for the first time and only in the municipality of Pétange, but did not receive a seat with 2.40%.

In the 2018 general election, the party ran for the first and only time in the Sud district, but did not receive a seat with 0.52%.

In the 2019 European Parliament election, the party ran for the first time nationwide, but did not receive a seat with 0.53%.

The party has about 100 members (as of 07.01.2018).

== Election results ==
=== Chamber of Deputies ===
Election	Votes	%	Seats	+/–	Government
2018	9,516	0.27 (#10)	0 / 60	New	Extra-parliamentary
2023	8,494	0.23 (#11)	0 / 60	0	Extra-parliamentary

=== European Parliament ===
Election	List leader	Votes	%	Seats	+/–	EP Group
2019	Joe Thein	6,652	0.53 (#10)	0 / 6	New	–
2024	Joe Thein	8,044	0.58 (#12)	0 / 6	0	–
