= Fernand Kartheiser =

Luxembourgish politician

Fernand Kartheiser MEP
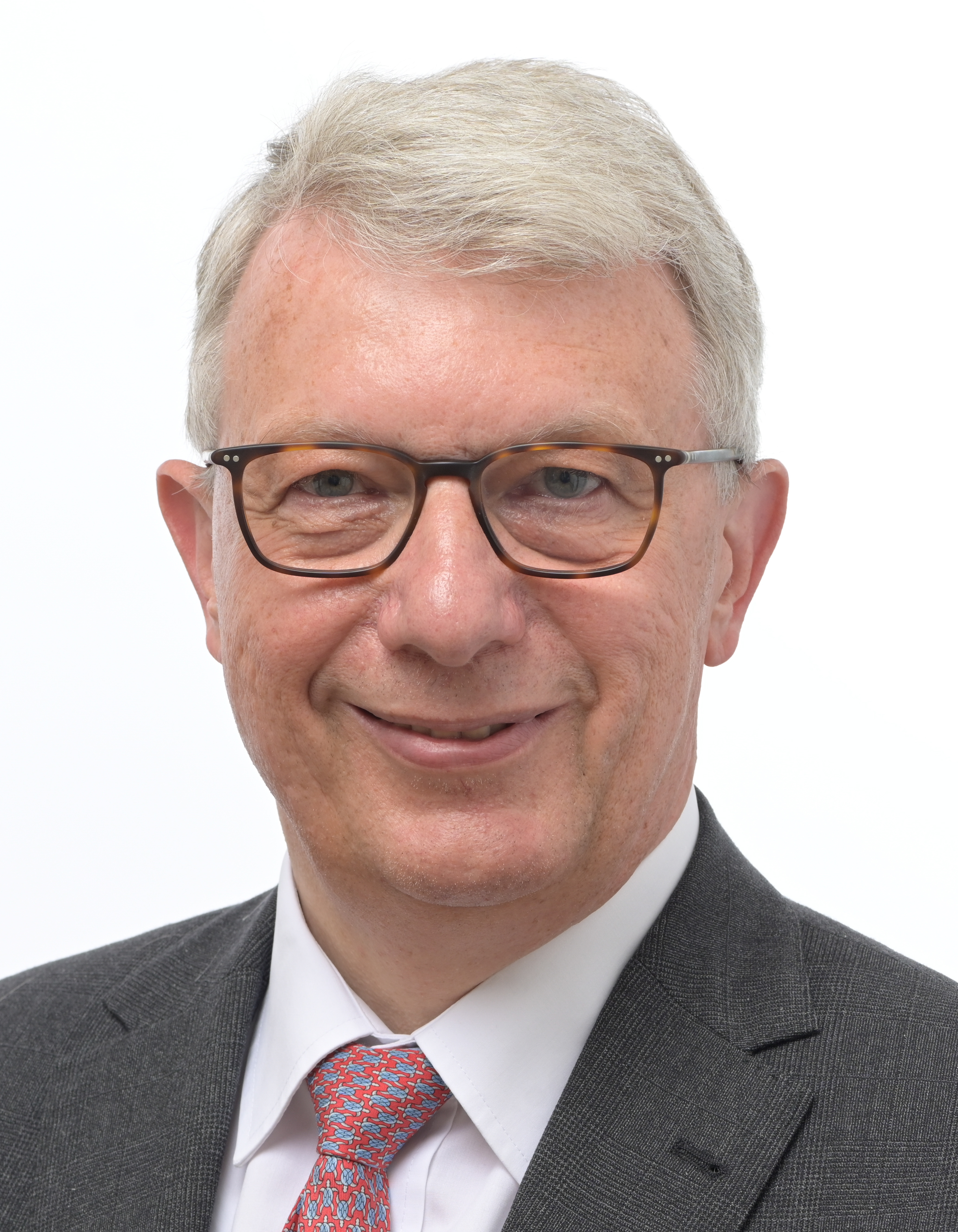

Member of the European Parliament
- Incumbent
- Assumed office 16 July 2024

Personal details
- Born: September 30, 1959 (age 66) Luxembourg City
- Party: Alternative Democratic Reform Party
- Website: fkartheiser.eu

Military service
- Allegiance: Luxembourg
- Branch/service: Luxembourg Armed Forces

Fernand Kartheiser (born 30 September 1959) is a Luxembourgish politician who was elected to the European Parliament in 2024, the first time a member of the Alternative Democratic Reform Party won a seat.

In 2025, Kartheiser was expelled from the European Conservatives and Reformists Group, because he visited Russia.
