= Jacques-Yves Henckes =

Luxembourgish politician (born 1945)

Jacques-Yves Henckes (born 12 October 1945 in Luxembourg City) is a Luxembourgish jurist and politician.

Henckes first gained office in 1975, when he was elected to the communal council of Luxembourg City representing the Democratic Party (DP). He first entered the Chamber of Deputies in 1984, but lost his seat in the election held that year. He re-entered the Chamber the following year, and remained until the 1989 election. In 1993, he joined the Action Committee for Democracy and Pensions Justice (now the Alternative Democratic Reform Party), but lost his seat on Luxembourg City's communal council. He was returned to the Chamber in 1994 for the Centre constituency, and was elected once again in the 1999 election, which was also the year he returned to the city council, and again in 2004.
