= Volt Luxembourg =

Volt Luxembourg Volt Lëtzebuerg
- Abbreviation: Volt
- Leaders: Aurélie Dap; Philippe Schannes
- Founded: 10. November 2018
- Ideology: Pro-Europeanism; European federalism
- European political alliance: Volt Europa
- Colors: Purple
- Chamber of Deputies: 0 / 60
- European Parliament: 0 / 6

Website
- voltletzebuerg.org

National sections of Volt Europa. The borders of the European Union are shown in red.

Volt Luxembourg (Luxembourgish: Volt Lëtzebuerg, French: Volt Luxembourg, German: Volt Luxemburg) is a political party in Luxembourg. It is an internal section of Volt Europa and was founded in 2018. It received 2.11% of the vote in the 2019 European elections, which meant that the party did not obtain a representative.

== Policies ==
=== Development through Volt Europa ===
Volt Europa, as the umbrella organisation of all Volt parties, adopted the "5+1 Challenges" after its foundation. With this, Volt defined the fundamental challenges that the party wants to meet across Europe and which are in principle the same everywhere, although the approach may differ. The +1 Challenge, on the other hand, is identical in all countries and has the goal of reforming and strengthening the European Union. In June 2018, the movement then adopted its European manifesto in the form of the Mapping of Policies, which served as the basis for the creation of all Volt programmes of the national Volt parties. As a result, Volt Europa contested the 2019 European elections in several countries with a joint election programme, the Amsterdam Declaration. Since then, the Mapping of Policies has been constantly expanded and, together with issue-specific documents, form the so-called Policy Portfolio, from which all national, regional and local programmes are derived.

=== Programmes of Volt Luxembourg ===
==== European policy ====
Volt positions itself pro-European and advocates the expansion of the European Union's competences in the areas of development, foreign and security policy. The party's goal is a "European republic". In order to make the EU more effective, Volt proposes the abolition of the veto and the restriction of the unanimity principle. In addition, the European Union should be able to levy taxes itself and protect human rights and the rule of law through the use of sanctions.

==== Climate policy ====
Volt understands climate policy as a cross-sector issue in which the transition to climate neutrality in accordance with the 1.5° target can only be achieved sustainably with a triad of climate protection, social justice and economic prosperity. For rapid decarbonisation, Volt calls for an increase in the carbon price via the European Union Emissions Trading System and strives, among other things, for a circular economy. In addition, climate-damaging subsidies are to be abolished and the expansion of renewable energies promoted. The party wants nuclear energy to be recognised by the EU as green energy and, while emphasising the risks according to the IPCC reports, regards it as a necessary source of energy to achieve the fastest possible reduction of CO_{2} emissions. Houses should become more energy efficient by promoting heat pumps and replacing fossil fuels as heating fuels. Volt also calls for climate diplomacy to support global efforts to combat climate change and promote sustainable mobility.

==== Digital policy ====
Volt is committed to more digitalisation. The party supports the targeted promotion of research, development and the use of artificial intelligence in Europe and advocates the establishment of a European centre of excellence for artificial intelligence. Accompanying regulations for ethics and transparency are to be developed and educational opportunities promoted.

==== Governance ====
Volt proposes the introduction of the right to vote in parliamentary elections for EU citizens who have lived in Luxembourg for at least 5 years.

==== Language policies ====
As of 2023, Volt is against making Luxembourgish an official language of the European Union.

== History ==
The party was officially founded on 10 November 2018, as the national branch of Volt Europa, a progressive and federalist European political alliance. The aim of the party and movement is to reform Europe, make it more democratic and strengthen the European Parliament, to which end it established offshoots across Europe.

=== European Election 2019 ===
The party's list of candidates for the European elections was officially presented on 20 March 2019. Thanks in part to a signature by DP member of parliament Max Hahn, in Luxembourg candidate lists require 250 signatures of support from voters or a people's representative, the list could be officially submitted and the party could stand for election. With roots in Luxembourg, Italy, Spain, France, America, Portugal and Great Britain, the list of candidates was very international in character. In addition to the candidates Marthe Hoffmann, Daniel Silva and Julia Pitterman, the former rector of the University of Luxembourg, Rolf Tarrach, stood as the top candidate, the chair of the group of British immigrants living in Luxembourg (Brill) and co-chair of British in Europe, Fiona Godfrey, and Christopher Lilyblad, Betzdorf local councillor, former CSV member and project manager at the EU Commission, stood for the party.

In the run-up to the election, RTL initially refused to broadcast an election advertisement for the party because it was in French instead of Luxembourgish. After an intervention by the independent broadcasting authority (Alia), the station broadcast the election spot after all.

Prior to the election, candidates from the party joined other candidates in signing a pledge to use their parliamentary position to strengthen LGBTQ protections in EU law and policy, create an environment for LGBTI human rights defenders, be an ally for underrepresented voices and ensure EU leadership on LGBTI rights. The party stressed that the EU must face and better address global issues such as affordable housing, poverty, gender inequality, homophobia, youth unemployment, the climate crisis and corruption. For Volt, the European Union is too focused on technocratic projects and needs to put citizens back at the centre of the project.

In the European elections, the party obtained just under 26,500 votes (2.11%), thus failing to obtain a mandated representative in Luxembourg, but achieving Volt's best relative result. However, with the German MEP Damian Boeselager, the party has a representative in the European Parliament as part of the European movement, as Boeselager confirmed after the election.

=== After the European Election ===
After the election, the party announced that it would contest upcoming parliamentary and European elections. In July 2020, the party criticised the uncoordinated approach during the Corona crisis and national go-it-alones instead of pooling resources in Europe to deal with the pandemic. They called for more joint action in Europe to deal with crises faster and better. The party also referred to other major challenges such as the refugee crisis and the climate crisis, which could not be successfully met with national solo efforts.

=== 2023 general election ===
In the 2023 general elections, the party ran 23 candidates in the South constituency and three candidates in the East. The focus of the programme in the election was on Europe, civic participation and climate protection.

== Election results ==
=== Chamber of Deputies ===
Election	Votes	%	Seats	+/–	Government
2023	7,001	0.19 (#12)	0 / 60	New	Extra-parliamentary

=== European Parliament ===
Election	List leader	Votes	%	Seats	+/–	EP Group
2019	Rolf Tarrach	26,483	2.11 (#8)	0 / 6	New	–
2024	Philippe Schannes	14,348	1.04 (#9)	0 / 6	0	–
