= Fokus (Luxembourg) =

Focus Fokus
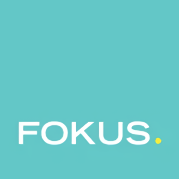
- Leader: Frank Engel
- President: Marc Ruppert
- Founded: 21 February 2022
- Split from: Christian Social People's Party; Democratic Party; The Greens
- Headquarters: Rue de l’Église, 69, Niederkorn, Luxembourg, 4552
- Ideology: Centrism; Pro-Europeanism
- Political position: Centre
- Colours: Teal
- Chamber of Deputies: 0 / 60
- European Parliament: 0 / 6

Website
- fokus.lu

The Fokus (lit. 'Focus') is a Luxembourgish political party founded on 21 February 2022. Founding members are the former CSV president Frank Engel, the former Democratic Party general secretary Marc Ruppert, the former president of the trade confederation and DP member Gary Kneip and the lawyer and Green communal councilor from Esch-sur-Alzette, Luc Majerus.

According to its own statements, Fokus is a "pragmatic party without a fixed ideology, located in the center of the political spectrum". Engel was the party's leading candidate in the 2023 general election, in which it received 2.49% of votes nationwide, failing to win any seats.

== Election results ==
=== Chamber of Deputies ===
Election	Votes	%	Seats	+/–	Government
2023	93,839	2.49 (#8)	0 / 60	New	Extra-parliamentary

=== European Parliament ===
Election	List leader	Votes	%	Seats	+/–	EP Group
2024	Frank Engel	22,222	1.60 (#8)	0 / 6	New	–
