= 2015 Luxembourg constitutional referendum =

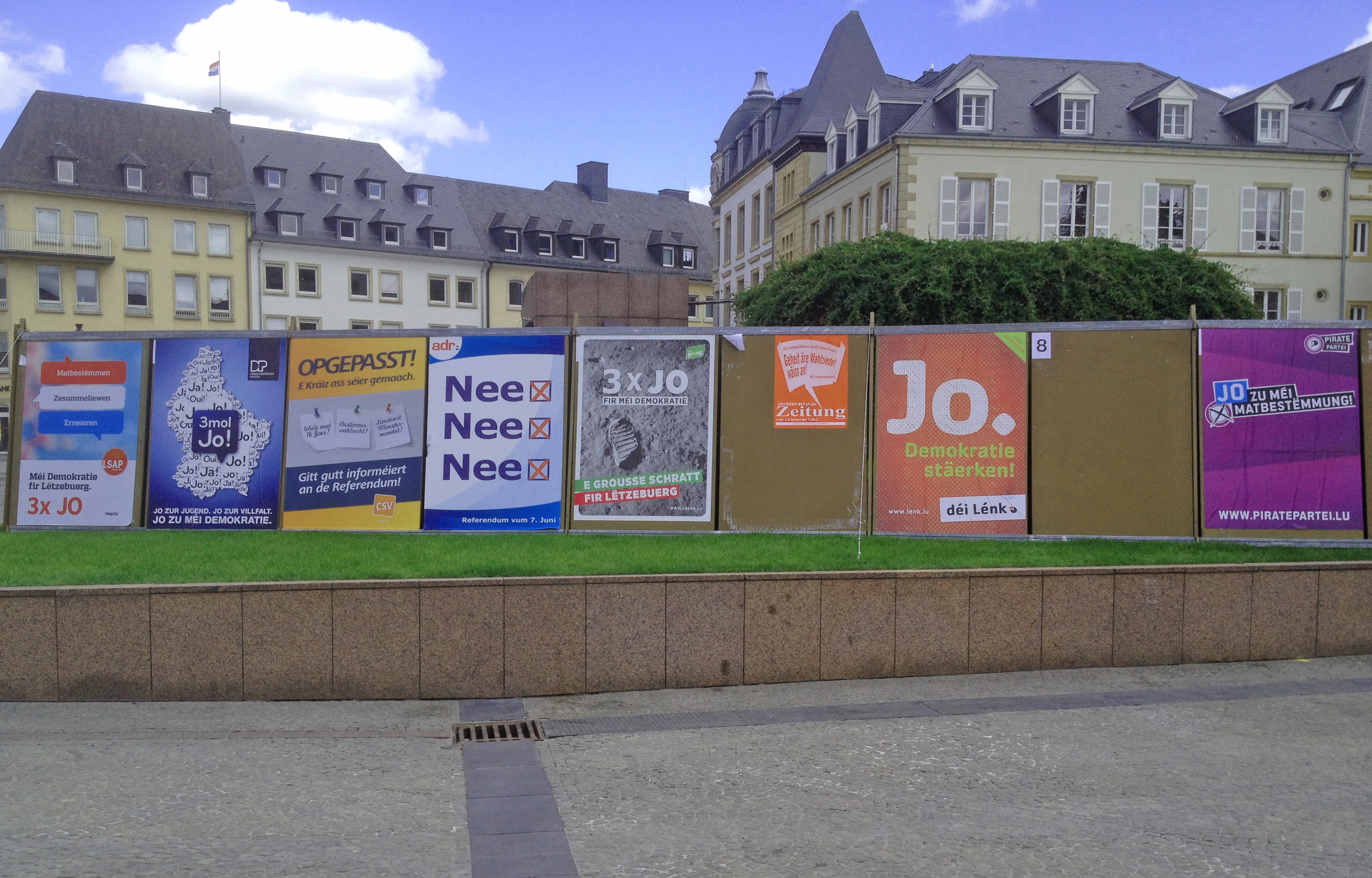
Posters by the political parties about the referendum

A constitutional referendum was held in Luxembourg on 7 June 2015. Although the referendum was non-binding, the government said they would adhere to the result. All three proposed constitutional amendments were ultimately rejected by voters.

== Questions ==
Voters were asked three questions:

1. Lowering the voting age to 16:
  "Do you approve of the idea that Luxembourg people aged between sixteen and eighteen should have the right to optionally register on electoral lists in order to participate as voters in the elections to the Chamber of Deputies, the European elections, municipal elections and referendums?"
2. Right of foreigners to vote:
  "Do you approve of the idea that residents without Luxembourg nationality should have the right to optionally register on electoral lists in order to participate as voters in the elections to the Chamber of Deputies, on the double condition that they have resided at least ten years in Luxembourg and that they have previously participated in European or municipal elections in Luxembourg?
3. Introducing term limits:
  "Do you approve of the idea of limiting to ten years the maximum period during which someone can continuously be part of the government (cabinet)?"

Another intended question was abandoned after an agreement between the Luxembourgish government and the religious representatives in January 2015:

1. Do you approve of the idea that the State should no longer have the obligation to take charge of wages and pensions of ministers of the recognised religions?

== Campaign ==
A "yes" (jo) vote to all three questions was supported by the three governing parties (Democratic Party, Socialist Workers' Party and The Greens), as well as by The Left and the Pirate Party. A "no" (nee) vote to all questions was supported by the conservative Alternative Democratic Reform Party. The largest political party, the Christian Social People's Party, also supported three "no" votes but emphasised that voters should be well-informed before voting.

== Opinion polls ==
A March 2015 poll indicated support for the third question, but not for the first and second ones.

In an April 2025 poll conducted for the referendum's 10th anniversary, a plurality of 46% of respondents supported lowering the voting age to 16, while 58% of Luxembourgish citizens polled and 75% of non-citizens supported the right of foreigners to vote in national elections.

== Results ==
| Question | For | | Against | | Invalid/ blank | Total | Registered voters | Turnout | Outcome |
| Question | Votes | % | Votes | % | Invalid/ blank | Total | Registered voters | Turnout | Outcome |
|---|---|---|---|---|---|---|---|---|---|
| Lowering the voting age to 16 | 40,102 | 19.13 | 169,899 | 80.87 | 4,835 | 214,836 | 246,974 | 86.99 | Rejected |
| Right of foreigners to vote | 46,031 | 21.98 | 163,362 | 78.02 | 5,443 | 214,836 | 246,974 | 86.99 | Rejected |
| Introducing term limits | 62,835 | 30.07 | 146,096 | 69.93 | 5,905 | 214,836 | 246,974 | 86.99 | Rejected |
Source: Government of Luxembourg

Maps of results by commune
Question 1

Question 2

Question 3
