= Alternative Democratic Reform Party =

Political party in Luxembourg

Alternative Democratic Reform Party Alternativ Demokratesch Reformpartei
- Abbreviation: ADR
- Leader: Alexandra Schoos
- Founded: 12 May 1987
- Split from: Christian Social People's Party
- Headquarters: 22, Rue de l'Eau; L-1449 Luxembourg
- Youth wing: ADRenalin
- Ideology: National conservatism; Euroscepticism; Luxembourgish language interests; Historical: Pensioners' interests
- Political position: Right-wing to far-right
- Regional affiliation: Christian Group
- European affiliation: AEN (2002–2009); ECR Party (since 2010)
- European Parliament group: ECR Group (2024–2025); Non-Inscrits (since 2025)
- Colours: Red, white, and blue
- Chamber of Deputies: 5 / 60 (8%)
- European Parliament: 1 / 6 (17%)
- Local councils: 9 / 722
- Benelux Parliament: 1 / 7

Website
- adr.lu

The Alternative Democratic Reform Party (ADR; Luxembourgish: Alternativ Demokratesch Reformpartei, French: Parti réformiste d'alternative démocratique, German: Alternative Demokratische Reformpartei) is a conservative and mildly populist political party in Luxembourg. It has five seats in the sixty-seat Chamber of Deputies, making it the fourth-largest party. In 2024, the party received its first seat in the European Parliament.

The party was founded in 1987 as a single-issue party demanding equality of state pension provision between civil servants and all other citizens. In the 1989 election, it won four seats and established itself as a political force. It peaked at seven seats in 1999, due to mistrust of politicians failing to resolve the pensions gap, before falling back to three, then coming back up to four then five. Its significance on a national level makes it the most successful pensioners' party in western Europe.

Political success has required the ADR to develop positions on all matters of public policy, developing an anti-establishment, conservative platform. It has adopted economic liberalism, filling a gap vacated by the Democratic Party. It is the largest party in Luxembourg to take a Euro-realist/softly Eurosceptic line, and is a member of the Alliance of Conservatives and Reformists in Europe. The ADR wishes to implement Swiss-style direct democracy and advocates and promotes intensely the preservation and use of the Luxembourgish language in state institutions and society. The ADR is most often characterised as being a national-conservative party.

== History ==
=== Emergence ===
The ADR has its roots in a demonstration in Luxembourg City on 28 March 1987, held to protest at the disparities between the 5/6ths final salary scheme enjoyed by civil servants and the basic state pension received by everyone else. The large crowd, and the collection of 10,000 signatures for a petition demanding change, persuaded the organisers that there was widespread public support. The party was founded on 12 May 1987 as the 'Action Committee 5/6ths Pensions for Everyone' (Aktiounskomitee 5/6 Pensioun fir jiddfereen).

In the 1989 election to the Chamber of Deputies, on 18 June 1989, the party achieved remarkable success by attracting votes from far beyond its core support base. Many Luxembourgers voted for the ADR as a protest vote, allowing the ADR to register 7.3% of the vote, win 4 of the 60 seats, and come fourth. The spectacular triumph of the party in the election required the leadership to formulate a new party strategy. On 12 November 1989, the name was amended to 'Action Committee 5/6ths' (Aktiounskomitee 5/6), reflecting its increased attention to other concerns. The party lost one of its deputies, Josy Simon, when he defected to the Democratic Party in spring 1991.

On 22 November 1992, the name was changed again, to 'Action Committee for Democracy and Pensions Justice' (Aktiounskomitee fir Demokratie an Rentengerechtigkeet). In December of the same year, the prominent deputy Fernand Rau defected from the Christian Social People's Party (CSV) after it broke its pledge to make him European Commissioner, increasing the ADR's representation back up to four. At the 10 October 1993 local elections, the ADR won 7 seats in communal councils. At the 1994 general election, the ADR got 9.0% of the vote and 5 seats, putting the ADR over the threshold required to qualify as a caucus, but the ADR fell to fifth place, behind the resurgent Greens.

=== Mainstream party ===
On 3 August 1998, a law was passed equalising pension provision between civil servants and other workers, fulfilling the ADR's original raison d'être, but this did not prevent the ADR from strengthening its position further. In the 1999 legislative election, the party enjoyed increased success, winning 9.4% of the vote and 7 seats. The results put the ADR back into fourth place, but the Greens managed to hold on to their seat in the simultaneous European elections. October 1999 saw ADR candidates elected in ten communes, with two winning in each of Luxembourg City and Esch-sur-Alzette. The ADR lost two of its Chamber of Deputies seats at the 2004 general election, and its share of the vote fell to under 10%.

One of ADR's hallmark positions is its euroscepticism, and it is the only eurosceptic party in the Chamber of Deputies. It was the only parliamentary party that actively campaigned against the Treaty establishing a Constitution for Europe, which was put to a referendum and narrowly passed with 56.5% of voters in favour.

On 2 April 2006 the name was changed once more, to its current name of 'Alternative Democratic Reform Party' (Alternativ Demokratesch Reformpartei). Significantly, for the first time, the name makes no reference to pension reform, signalling the eagerness of the ADR to further solidify its position as a major party in national politics. However, on 1 May, Aly Jaerling left the party to sit as an independent in the Chamber of Deputies, complaining of the move away from campaigning for pensions.

On 29 May 2008, the ADR deputies and Jaerling were the only members not to vote for the Treaty of Lisbon. In the 2009 Chamber election, the ADR held on to four seats (of which, 2 in Sud), but with a reduced vote share of 8.1%: its worst legislative election result since its first election, in 1989, whilst its vote share fell - albeit by less - in the simultaneous European Parliament election, to 7.4%. Jaerling, running for his own Citizens' List, failed to win a seat in either. This had been in spite of strong pre-election polling, the difference likely to be attributable to the financial crisis pushing voters to more familiar parties.

On 8 June 2010, the ADR joined the Alliance of Conservatives and Reformists in Europe, a Euro-Realist Europe-wide political party. In the snap-election of 2013, the ADR once again fell in their share of the vote, from 8.14% to 6.64%. However, they did manage to regain one seat, having fallen to only two MPs after the defections of Jacques-Yves Henckes and Jean Colombera. The former sat out the 2009-2013 legislative period as an independent, the latter founded the Party for Full Democracy. Roy Reding regained the mandate in the Centre district, putting the party back at 3 mandates.

During the Constitutional Referendum Campaign of 2015, the ADR was the only party to explicitly campaign for the "3 x No" vote, thereby rejecting the opening of the right to vote for 16 year-olds and foreign residents, as well as rejecting the idea of limiting minister mandates to 10 years. This campaign was in stark contrast to the campaign of the largest party, the CSV, whose main message was to "be informed" when voting. With each question being rejected by between 70% and 80% of the electorate, this event represented a big political win for the ADR in face of the incumbent Government.

3 years after the Referendum, on 2 March 2018, the ADR announced that it would be co-operating with the citizen's movement Wee 2050 - Nee 2015, which had been founded pre-referendum to campaign for the "3 x No". The cooperation agreement involved Wee 2050 having up to 8 places on the ADR's electoral lists for the legislative election of October 2018, and ensured that the movement could remain relatively independent by not requiring the Wee 2050 candidates to be members of the ADR per se.

In 2020-2021, during the COVID-19 pandemic, the ADR was the only political party in Luxembourg to oppose governmental measures like closing restaurants, claiming the restrictions infringed upon personal freedoms.

Following the 2025 expulsion of (ADR) MEP Fernand Kartheiser from the ECR group for visiting Russia, the Patriots for Europe group approached the ADR for talks. The ADR stated that while it was considering what group the party wanted to belong to if the whole party were fully expelled from the ECR, it was not yet actively discussing membership with any other political group.

== Ideology ==
The party was founded as a single-issue party, to introduce equality between private and public sector pensions. The focus on pension reform allowed it to make it the core campaign issue of all five elections in the first ten years of its formation. By 1998, the party had forced the government to accede almost all of its demands. However, this success has not thwarted the ADR, and it has diversified its programme to cover all aspects of public policy.

The party is a supporter of economic liberalism, having positioned itself to fill what it say is a void left by the Democratic Party. The party is critical of public sector waste and the 'elitist' nature of public spending projects. The ADR is socially conservative. It is opposed to euthanasia and assisted suicide. Luxembourgish former foreign minister and socialist politician Jean Asselborn has stated that as of the year 2020 ADR is not a far-right political party.

The party places great importance on promoting the Luxembourgish language, and its electoral success in the 1999 election pushed the CSV-DP government to make knowledge of it a criterion for naturalisation. It is currently also the only political party in Luxembourg that wishes to implement written laws also in Luxembourgish (together with French and German) and that wants Luxembourgish to be an officially recognized language of the European Union. While Maltese or Irish for example are fully recognized official languages of the EU, Luxembourgish is not. In 2005 politician Jean Asselborn of LSAP rejected a demand made by ADR to make Luxembourgish an official language of the European Union citing financial reasons and also that German and French being already official languages would be sufficient for the needs of Luxembourg. ADR is also opposed to multiple citizenship.

The party is marked out from the other parties by being softly Eurosceptic, sharing this position with only the far left, and being the country's most sovereigntist party. The leadership had supported the proposed European Constitution, endorsing it in the 2004 European election, before changing its position in the spring of 2005 under pressure from party members. In its criticism of the EU, the party puts emphasis on the democratic deficit and transparency. However, in heavily pro-European Luxembourg, the ADR had always fared worse in European elections than on national elections, which were held on the same day. This was the case only until 2014, when the party achieved a slightly better score than it had in the early 2013 national elections, managing to beat the LSAP in the majority of communes. The party is opposed to EU sanctions on Russia, suggesting that they harm Luxembourg's economy.

The Shoura (the assembly of the Muslim community of the Grand Duchy) stated in a 2013 review that "of all political parties in Luxembourg, ADR is the party that appears most hostile to Muslims, true to its clichés that Islam is not soluble in democracy. ADR furthermore feels obliged to mention a possible prohibition of the burqa, and that polygamy or courts based on Sharia law as not compatible with European law and values."

Furthermore, in its declaration of principles it has outlined, among others, the following priorities:

- Human rights and individual freedoms
- Parliamentarian democracy in form of a constitutional monarchy
- Implementation of direct democratic plebiscite of the citizens on important issues (referendums)
- Freedom of the press
- Judicial independence
- Equal treatment between men and women
- Social justice
- Preservation and promotion of the Luxembourgish language (and giving it the status of an official language of the European Union)
- Against discrimination and for equal use of Luxembourgish and German in contrast to French in state institutions and society, and thus preservation of multilingualism in Luxembourg
- Seeing Luxembourg as having heritage in Greco-Roman civilization with Judeo-Christian traditions
- Seeing Luxembourg as a refuge for politically and religiously persecuted people
- Integration of refugees and immigrants into Luxembourgish society by respecting Luxembourgish, European and democratic values
- For the creation a Common European Defense policy
- A commitment to a green and environmentally friendly policy and the ethical treatment of animals

== Election results ==
=== Chamber of Deputies ===
Election	Votes	%	Seats	+/–	Government
1989	225,262	7.9 (#4)	4 / 60	New	Opposition
1994	244,045	9.0 (#5)	5 / 60	▲1	Opposition
1999	303,734	11.3 (#4)	7 / 60	▲2	Opposition
2004	278,792	10.0 (#5)	5 / 60	▼2	Opposition
2009	232,744	8.1 (#5)	4 / 60	▼1	Opposition
2013	217,683	6.6 (#5)	3 / 60	▼1	Opposition
2018	292,388	8.3 (#5)	4 / 60	▲1	Opposition
2023	348,990	9.3 (#4)	5 / 60	▲1	Opposition

=== European Parliament ===
Election	List leader	Votes	%	Seats	+/–	EP Group
1994	Gaston Gibéryen	70,470	6.95 (#5)	0 / 6	New	–
1999	Gaston Gibéryen	91,118	8.99 (#5)	0 / 6	0	–
2004	Gaston Gibéryen	87,666	8.04 (#5)	0 / 6	0	–
2009	Gaston Gibéryen	83,168	7.39 (#5)	0 / 6	0	–
2014	Gaston Gibéryen	88,298	7.53 (#5)	0 / 6	0	–
2019	Gaston Gibéryen	125,988	10.0 (#5)	0 / 6	Steady	–
2024	Fernand Kartheiser	162,849	11.76 (#5)	1 / 6	▲1	ECR

== Organization ==
=== Leaders ===
==== Party presidents ====
- Gaston Gibéryen (1987–1989)
- John Bram (1989–1991)
- Robert Mehlen (1991 – 2013)
- Fernand Kartheiser (2013)
- Jean Schoos (2013 – 2022)
- Fred Keup (2022-2024)
- Alexandra Schoos (2024-)

=== Elected representatives ===
Since its formation, the ADR has had thirteen deputies in the Chamber of Deputies. Its five current deputies are given in bold.

- Josy Simon (Center: 1989–1991)
- Fernand Rau (Center: 1992–1994)
- Fernand Greisen (Center: 1999–2004)
- Aly Jaerling (South: 1999–2006)
- Jean-Pierre Koepp (North: 1989–2009)
- Robert Mehlen (East: 1989–2009)
- Jacques-Yves Henckes (Center: 1994–2013)
- Jean Colombera (North: 1999–2004, 2009–2013)
- Gaston Gibéryen (South: 1989–2020)
- Roy Reding (Center: 2013–2023)
- Fernand Kartheiser (South: 2009–2024)
- **Jeff Engelen** (North: 2018-)
- **Fred Keup** (South: 2020-)
- **Tom Weidig** (Center: 2023-)
- **Alexandra Schoos** (East: 2023-)
- **Dan Hardy** (South: 2024–present)

=== Political base ===
The ADR's primary political base are the CSV's 'traditional, rural and rightist' voters. Although the ADR is seen to take votes from the right wing of the CSV, more ADR voters declare themselves to be left-wing than either the CSV or DP. Much of the party's support is in the north of the country, where the ADR received its strongest support in the 1999 (16.7%), 2004 (14.7%) and 2009 Chamber elections (10.3%). In 2013 however it received its highest share of the vote in the Est constituency.

Due to the party's original purpose of pension equality, the party's electoral base is pensioners. However, disproportionately many people under the age of 24 also see the ADR in a positive light. ADR is particularly popular on the Internet, despite the party leadership's lack of interest in the medium, due in part to its popularity amongst young people. The party is most popular amongst people earning less than €30,000, and has attracted support from the part of the CSV's core electorate that have been left out of recent economic growth. As with the CSV and LSAP, the ADR is supported by people with less education.

The party is backed by the third-largest general trade union in the country, the small Neutral Union of Luxembourg Workers (NGL), which has been the driving force behind the ADR. The ADR has also been close to the Luxembourg Association of Retired and Invalid People (LRIV), which formerly backed the Communist Party. The party has used local celebrities, such as Jean-Pierre Koepp in Nord, to boost its appeal.

== See also ==
- List of political parties in Luxembourg
