= Appropriation (art) =

Use of pre-existing objects or images with little or no transformation applied to them

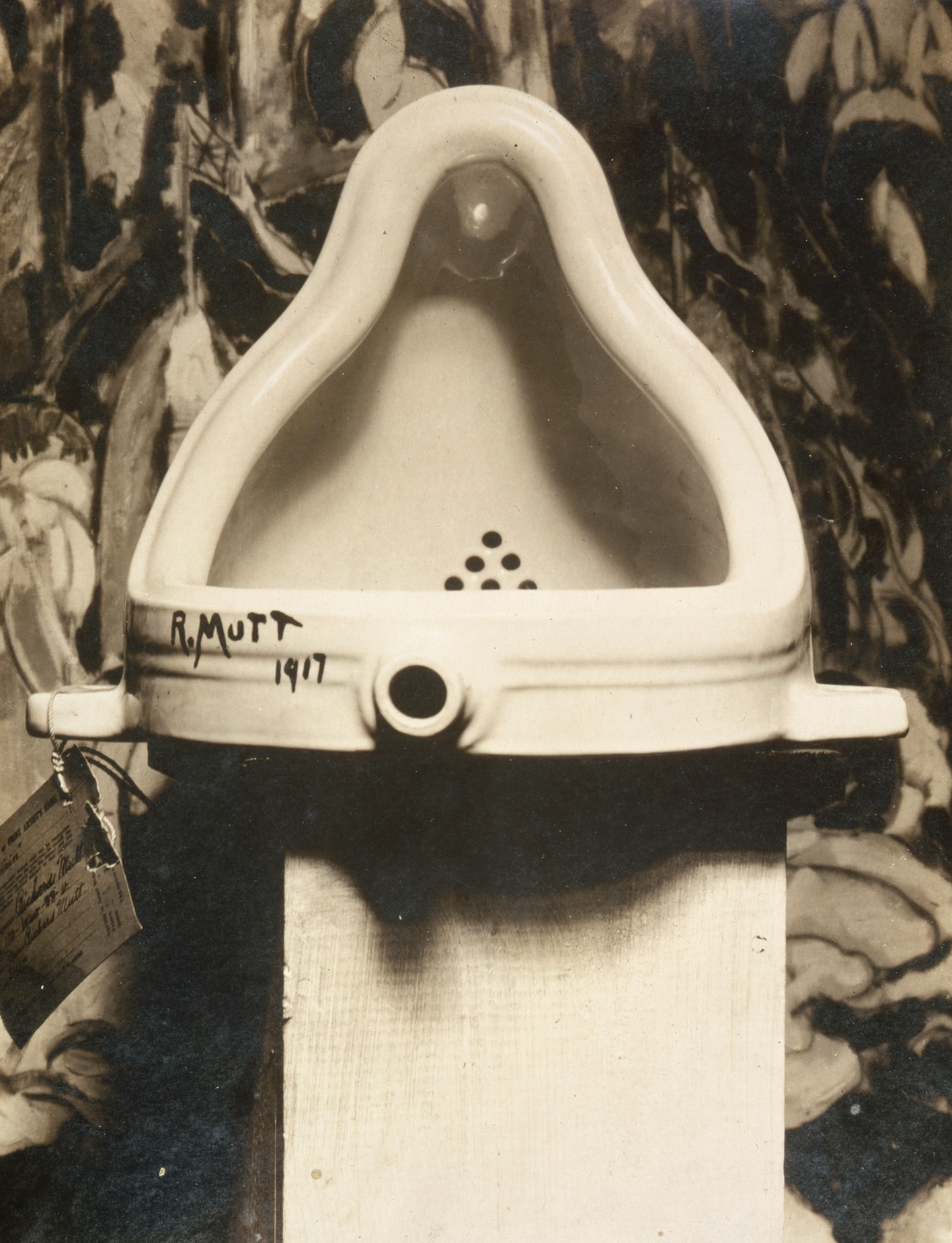
Marcel Duchamp Fountain, 1917, photograph by Alfred Stieglitz at 291 (art gallery) following the 1917 Society of Independent Artists exhibit, with entry tag visible. The backdrop is The Warriors by Marsden Hartley.

In art, appropriation is the use of pre-existing objects or images with little or no transformation applied to them. The use of appropriation has played a significant role in the history of the arts (literary, visual, musical and performing arts). In the visual arts, "to appropriate" means to properly adopt, borrow, recycle or sample aspects (or the entire form) of human-made visual culture. Notable in this respect are the readymades of Marcel Duchamp.

Inherent in the understanding of appropriation is the concept that the new work recontextualizes whatever it borrows to create the new work. In most cases, the original "thing" remains accessible as the original, without change.

== Definition ==
Appropriation, similar to found object art is "as an artistic strategy, the intentional borrowing, copying, and alteration of preexisting images, objects, and ideas". It has also been defined as "the taking over, into a work of art, of a real object or even an existing work of art." The Tate Gallery traces the practice back to Cubism and Dadaism, and continuing into 1940s Surrealism and 1950s Pop art. It returned to prominence in the 1980s with the Neo-conceptual art and Neo-Geo artists, and is now common practice amongst contemporary artists like Richard Prince, Sherrie Levine, Zhou Tiehai and Jeff Koons.

== History ==
Suggestions of art appropriation in antiquity refer to artworks at least as early as those of the Xiongnu in Central Asia in the first millennium BCE.

=== 19th century ===
Many artists made references to works by previous artists or themes.

In 1856 Ingres painted the portrait of Madame Moitessier. The unusual pose is known to have been inspired by the famous ancient Roman wall painting Herakles Finding His Son Telephas. In doing so, the artist created a link between his model and an Olympian goddess.

Edouard Manet painted Olympia in 1865, inspired by Titian's Venus of Urbino. His painting Le Déjeuner sur l'herbe was also inspired by the work of the Old Masters; specifically, its composition is based on a detail of Marcantonio Raimondi's The Judgement of Paris (1515).

Gustave Courbet is believed to have seen the famous color woodcut The Great Wave off Kanagawa by Japanese artist Katsushika Hokusai before painting a series of the Atlantic Ocean during the summer of 1869.

Vincent van Gogh shows influences inspired by Jean Francois Millet, Delacroix, and the Japanese prints he had in his collection. In 1889, Van Gogh created 20 painted copies inspired by Millet black-and-white prints. He enlarged the compositions of the prints and then painted them in colour according to his own imagination. Vincent wrote in his letters that he had set out to "translate them into another language". He said that it was not simply copying: if a performer "plays some Beethoven he'll add his personal interpretation to it… it isn't a hard and fast rule that only the composer plays his own compositions". More examples can be found on Copies by Vincent van Gogh.

Claude Monet, a collector of Japanese prints, created several works inspired by these, such as The Garden at Sainte-Adresse, 1867 inspired by Fuji from the Platform of Sasayedo by Katsushika Hokusai; The Water Lily Pond series Under Mannen Bridge at Fukagawa, 1830-1831 by Hokusai or La Japonaise, 1876 likely inspired by Kitagawa Tsukimaro Geisha, a pair of hanging scroll paintings, 1820-1829.

=== First half of the 20th century ===
In the early twentieth century Pablo Picasso and Georges Braque appropriated objects from a non-art context into their work. In 1912, Picasso pasted a piece of oil cloth onto the canvas. Subsequent compositions, such as Guitar, Newspaper, Glass and Bottle (1913) in which Picasso used newspaper clippings to create forms, is early collage that became categorized as part of synthetic cubism. The two artists incorporated aspects of the "real world" into their canvases, opening up discussion of signification and artistic representation.

Marcel Duchamp in 1915 introduced the concept of the readymade, in which "industrially produced utilitarian objects...achieve the status of art merely through the process of selection and presentation." Duchamp explored this notion as early as 1913 when he mounted a stool with a bicycle wheel and again in 1915 when he purchased a snow shovel and inscribed it "in advance of the broken arm, Marcel Duchamp." In 1917, Duchamp organized the submission of a readymade into the Society of Independent Artists exhibition under the pseudonym "R. Mutt". Entitled Fountain, it consisted of a porcelain urinal that was propped atop a pedestal and signed "R. Mutt 1917". The work posed a direct challenge, starkly juxtaposing to traditional perceptions of fine art, ownership, originality and plagiarism, and was subsequently rejected by the exhibition committee. The New York Dada magazine The Blind Man defended Fountain, claiming "whether Mr. Mutt with his own hands made the fountain or not has no importance. He CHOSE it. He took an ordinary article of life, placed it so that its useful significance disappeared under the new title and point of view—and created a new thought for that object."

The Dada movement continued to play with the appropriation of everyday objects and their combination in collage. Dada works featured deliberate irrationality and the rejection of the prevailing standards of art. Kurt Schwitters shows a similar sensibility in his "Merz" works. He constructed parts of these from found objects, and they took the form of large Gesamtkunstwerk constructions that are now called installations.

During his Nice Period (1908–1913), Henri Matisse painted several paintings of odalisques, inspired by the Women of Algiers paintings by Delacroix.

The Surrealists, coming after the Dada movement, also incorporated the use of 'found objects', such as Méret Oppenheim's Object (Luncheon in Fur) (1936) or Salvador Dalí's Lobster Telephone (1936). These found objects took on new meaning when combined with other unlikely and unsettling objects.

=== 1950–1960: Pop art and realism ===
In the 1950s, Robert Rauschenberg created what he called "Combine Paintings", combining ready-made objects, such as car tires or beds, with painting, silk-screens, collage, and photography. Similarly, Jasper Johns incorporated found-object imagery into his work, such as in his White Flag. In 1958 Bruce Conner produced the influential A Movie in which he recombined existing film clips.

In the early 1960s the Fluxus art movement also utilized appropriation: its members blended different artistic disciplines, including visual art, experimental music, and literature. Throughout the 1960s and 1970s they staged Happening Events from found objects and produced sculptural works featuring unconventional found objects and materials. Also in the early 1960s artists such as Claes Oldenburg and Andy Warhol appropriated images from commercial art and popular culture as well as the techniques of these industries with (for example) Warhol's Green Coca-Cola Bottles painting of Coca-Cola bottles. Called "Pop Artists", they saw mass popular-culture as the main vernacular in culture. These artists fully engaged with the ephemera produced from this mass-produced culture while distancing themselves from the evident work of an artist's hand. Roy Lichtenstein became known for appropriating pictures from comics books with paintings such as Masterpiece (1962) or Drowning Girl (1963) and from famous artists such as Picasso or Matisse. Elaine Sturtevant (also known simply as Sturtevant), on the other hand, created replicas of famous works by her contemporaries. Artists she 'copycatted' included Warhol, Jasper Johns, Joseph Beuys, Duchamp, James Rosenquist, Roy Lichtenstein, and more. While not exclusively reproducing Pop Art, that was a significant focus of her practice. She replicated Andy Warhol's Flowers in 1965 at the Bianchini Gallery in New York City, for example.

In France in the 1960s, a group of artists called the "New Realists" used banal objects in their art. For example, the sculptor Cesar compressed cars to create monumental sculptures, and the artist Arman included everyday machine-made objects—ranging from buttons and spoons to automobiles and boxes filled with trash. The German artists Sigmar Polke and his friend Gerhard Richter, who defined the term Capitalist Realism, offered an ironic critique of consumerism in post-war Germany. They used pre-existing photographs and transformed them into paintings. Polke's best-known works were his collages of imagery from pop culture and advertising, like his "Supermarkets" scenes of super heros shopping at a grocery store.

=== 1970–1980: The Picture Generation and Neo Pop ===
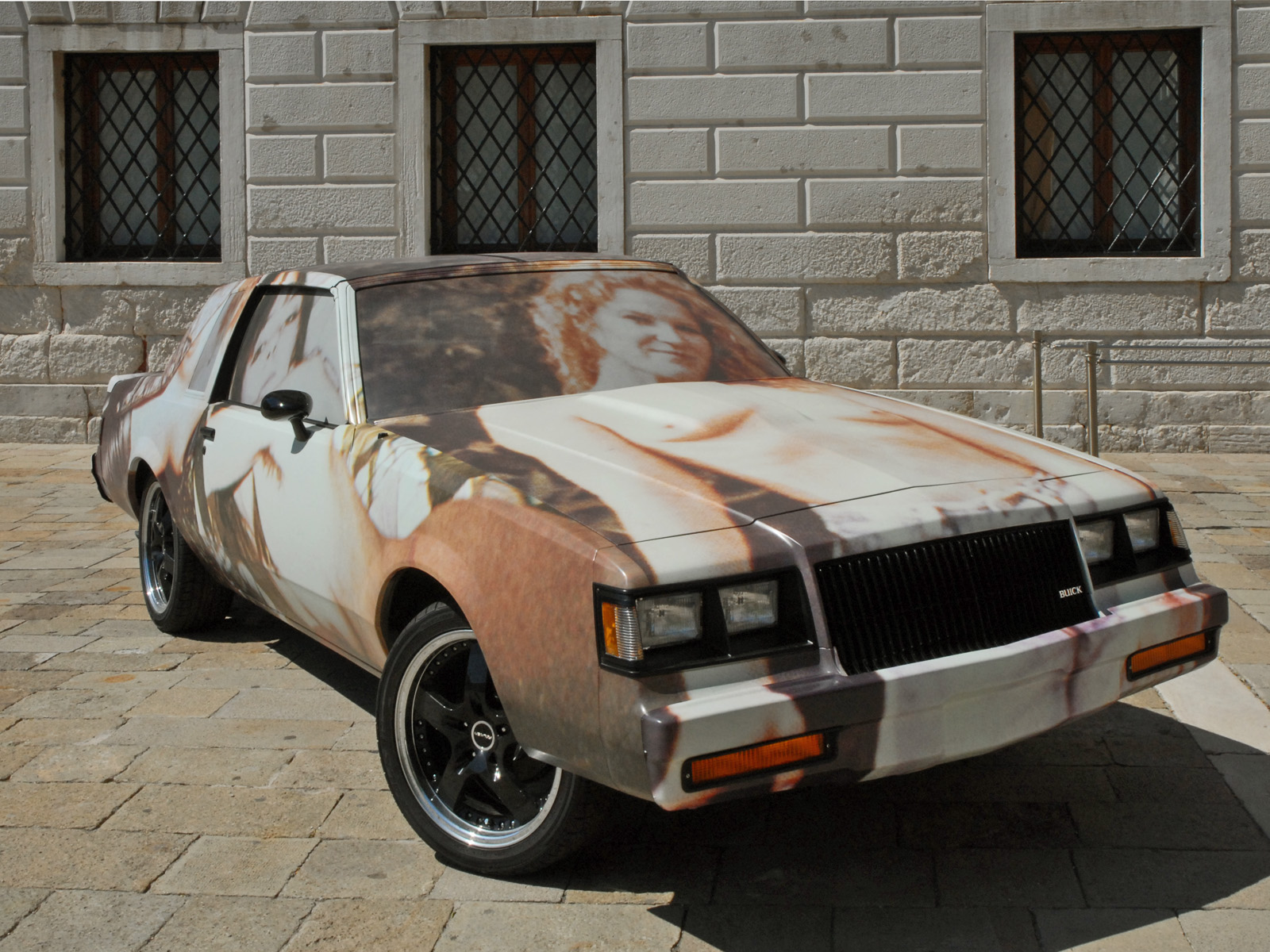
Richard Prince, Covering Hannah (1987 Buick Grand National)

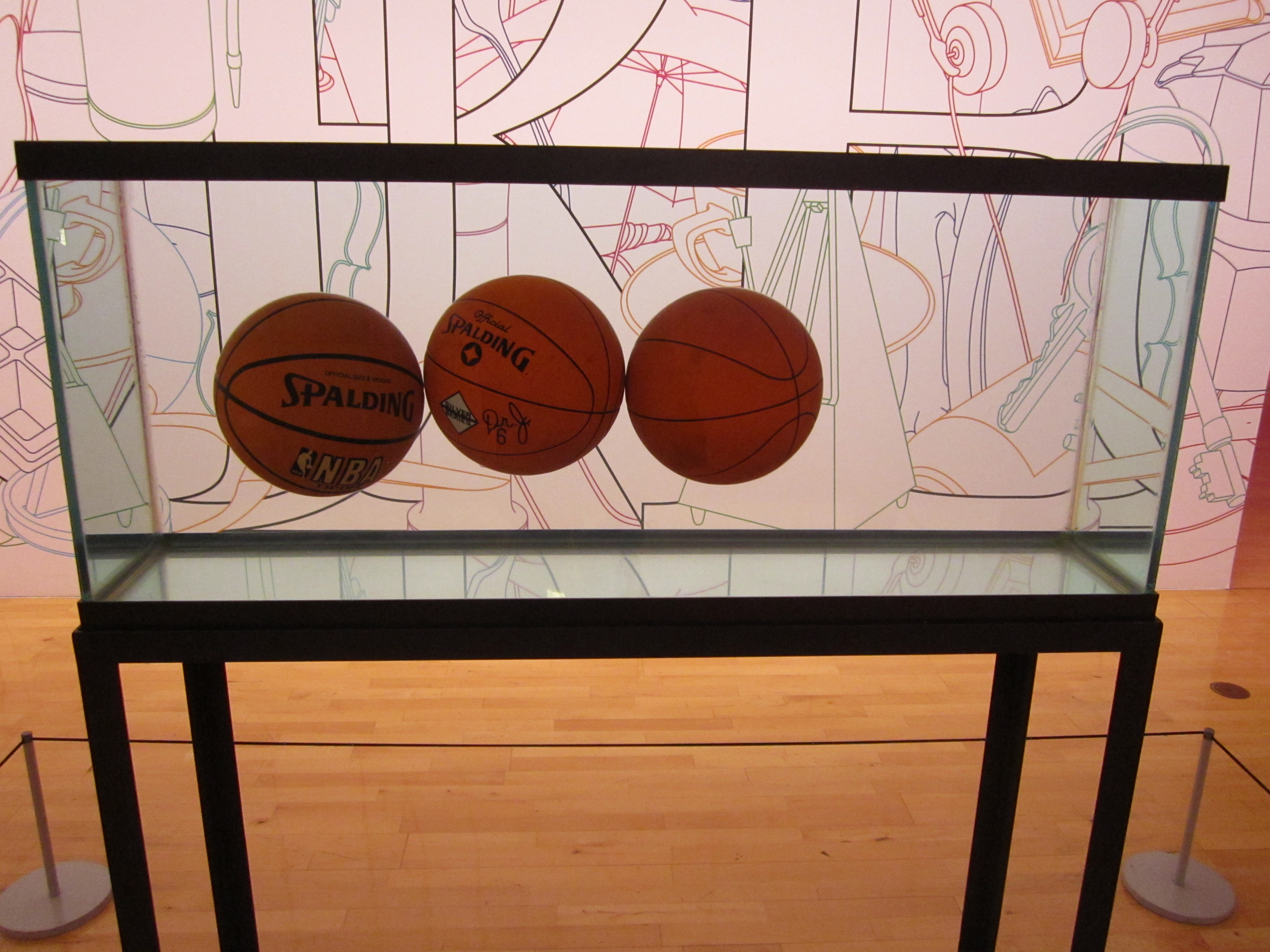
Three Ball Total Equilibrium Tank (1983) by Jeff Koons, Tate Liverpool

Whilst appropriation in bygone eras utilised the likes of 'language', contemporary appropriation has become most 'iconic' by using photography for exploring 'semiotic models of representation'. The Pictures Generation was a group of artists, influenced by Conceptual and Pop art, who utilized appropriation and montage to reveal the constructed nature of images. An exhibition named The Pictures Generation, 1974–1984 at The Metropolitan Museum of Art (The Met) in New York City from April 29 – August 2, 2009 included among other artists John Baldessari, Barbara Kruger, Sherrie Levine, Richard Prince, David Salle, and Cindy Sherman.

Sherrie Levine addressed the act of appropriating itself as a theme in art. Levine often quotes entire works in her own work, for example photographing photographs of Walker Evans. Challenging ideas of originality, drawing attention to relations between power, gender and creativity, consumerism and commodity value, the social sources and uses of art, Levine plays with the theme of "almost same".

During the 1970s and 1980s Richard Prince re-photographed advertisements such as those for Marlboro cigarettes or photo-journalism shots. His work aimed to take anonymous and ubiquitous cigarette billboard-advertising campaigns and elevate their status, focusing the viewer's gaze on the images' representation.

Appropriation artists comment on all aspects of culture and society. Joseph Kosuth appropriated images to engage with epistemology and metaphysics.

Other artists working with appropriation during this time with included Greg Colson, and Malcolm Morley.

In the late 1970s Dara Birnbaum was working with appropriation to produce feminist works of art. In 1978-79 she produced one of the first video appropriations. Technology/Transformation: Wonder Woman utilised video clips from the Wonder Woman television-series.

Richard Pettibone began replicating on a miniature scale works by newly-famous artists such as Andy Warhol, and later also modernist masters, signing the original artist's name as well as his own.

Jeff Koons gained recognition in the 1980s by creating conceptual sculptures The New series, a series of vacuum-cleaners, often selected for brand-names that appealed to the artist like the iconic Hoover, and in the vein of the readymades of Duchamp. Later he created sculptures in stainless steel inspired by inflatable toys such as bunnies or dogs.

=== 1990s ===
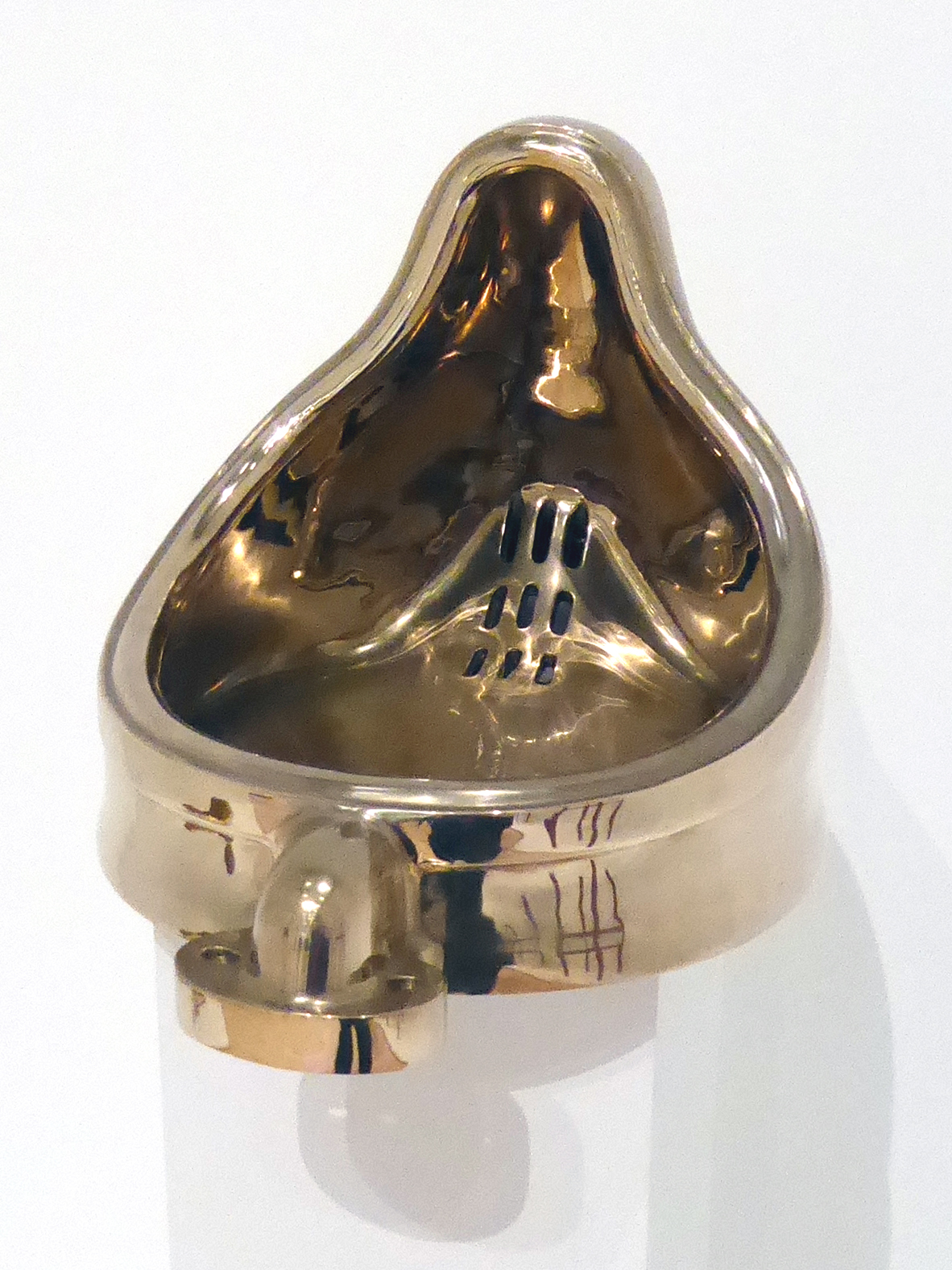
Fountain (Buddha) a bronze remake by Sherrie Levine, 1996

In the 1990s artists continued to produce appropriation art, using it as a medium to address theories and social issues, rather than focussing on the works themselves. This typically is the case of Peruvian painter Herman Braun-Vega, in whom the appropriation of the works of the old masters is almost systematic and who, after beginning by making painted commentaries of the painting of others in the late 1960s, ends up putting the characters borrowed from Western painting iconography in the presence of the social and political reality of his time. The great triptych from the permanent collection of the Ralli Museum in Marbella, The Informal Family (Velazquez, Goya, Picasso), is an example of multiple appropriations coexisting within the same work with the painter's contemporaries in scenes describing the social situation in third world countries where the family in the broad sense is a circle of subsistence economy. Braun-Vega recontextualises appropriated works and gives them a new meaning. For his part, Damian Loeb used film and cinema to comment on themes of simulacrum and reality. Other high-profile artists working at this time included Christian Marclay, Deborah Kass, and Genco Gulan.

Yasumasa Morimura is a Japanese appropriation artist who borrows images from historical artists (such as Édouard Manet or Rembrandt) to modern artists as Cindy Sherman, and inserts his own face and body into them.

Saulteaux First Nations artist Robert Houle gained prominence through his appropriation of historical images and documents to criticize historical violence against Indigenous peoples in Canada. Houle's work Kanata (1992) utilized imagery from Benjamin West's The Death of General Wolfe (1770), forgoing color in most of the frame to instead highlight the imagery of a Delaware warrior inserted by West.

Sherrie Levine appropriated the appropriated when she made polished cast bronze urinals named Fountain. They are considered to be an "homage to Duchamp's renowned readymade. Adding to Duchamp's audacious move, Levine turns his gesture back into an "art object" by elevating its materiality and finish. As a feminist artist, Levine remakes works specifically by male artists who commandeered patriarchal dominance in art history."

=== 21st century ===
Appropriation is frequently used by contemporary artists who often reinterpret previous artworks such as French artist Zevs who reinterpreted logos of brands like Google or works by David Hockney. Many urban and street artists also use images from the popular culture such as Shepard Fairey or Banksy, who appropriated artworks by Claude Monet or Vermeer with his girl with a pierced eardrum.

Canadian Cree artist Kent Monkman appropriates iconic paintings from European and North American art history and populates them with Indigenous visions of resistance.

In 2014 Richard Prince released a series of works titled New Portraits appropriating the photos of anonymous and famous persons (such as Pamela Anderson) who had posted a selfie on Instagram. The modifications to the images by the artist are the comments Prince added under the photos.

Damien Hirst was accused in 2018 of appropriating the work of Emily Kngwarreye and others from the painting community in Utopia, Northern Territory with the Veil paintings, that according to Hirst were "inspired by Pointillist techniques and Impressionist and Post-Impressionist painters such as Bonnard and Seurat".

Mr. Brainwash is an urban artist who became famous thanks to Banksy and whose style fuses historic pop imagery and contemporary cultural iconography to create his version of a pop–graffiti art hybrid first popularized by other street artists.

Brian Donnelly, known as Kaws, has used appropriation in his series, The Kimpsons, and painted The Kaws Album inspired by the Simpsons Yellow Album which itself was a parody of the cover art for the Beatles album Sgt. Pepper's Lonely Hearts Club Band replaced with characters from the Simpsons. On April 1, 2019, at Sotheby's in Hong Kong, The Kaws Album (2005), sold for 115.9 million Hong Kong dollars, or about $14.7 million U.S. dollars. In addition, he has reworked other familiar characters such as Mickey Mouse, the Michelin Man, the Smurfs, Snoopy, and SpongeBob SquarePants.

== In the digital age ==
Since the 1990s, the exploitation of historical precursors is as multifarious as the concept of appropriation is unclear. An unparalleled quantity of appropriations pervades not only the field of the visual arts, but of all cultural areas. The new generation of appropriators considers themselves "archeolog[es] of the present time". Some speak of "postproduction", which is based on pre-existing works, to re-edit "the screenplay of culture". The annexation of works made by others or of available cultural products mostly follows the concept of use. So-called "prosumers"—those consuming and producing at the same time—browse through the ubiquitous archive of the digital world (more seldom through the analog one), in order to sample the ever accessible images, words, and sounds via 'copy-paste' or 'drag-drop' to 'bootleg', 'mashup' or 'remix' them just as one likes. French curator Nicolas Bourriaud coined the neologism Semionaut – a portmanteau of semiotics and astronaut – to describe this. He writes: "DJs, Web surfers, and postproduction artists imply a similar configuration of knowledge, which is characterized by the invention of paths through culture. All three are "semionauts" who produce original pathways through signs." Appropriations have today become an everyday phenomenon.

The new "generation remix"—who have taken to the stages of visual arts, music, literature, dance and film—has led to controversial debates. Media scholar Lawrence Lessig coined the term remix culture at the beginning of the 2000s. Some foresee a new age of innovative, useful, and entertaining ways for art of the digitized and globalized 21st century. The new appropriationists will not only realize Joseph Beuys' dictum that everyone is an artist but will also "build free societies". By liberating art from traditional concepts such as aura, originality, and genius, they intend to find new ways of understanding and defining art. Other observers see this as the starting point of a huge problem. They think that if creation is based on nothing more than carefree processes of finding, copying, recombining and manipulating pre-existing media, concepts, forms, names, etc. of any source, the understanding of art will shift to a trivialized, low-demanding, and regressive activity. In view of the limitation of art to references of pre-existing concepts and forms, they foresee endless recompiled and repurposed products. Skeptics call this a culture of recycling with an addiction to the past.

Some have stated that only lazy people who have nothing to say let themselves be inspired by the past in this way. Others fear, that this new trend of appropriation is caused by nothing more than the wish of embellishing oneself with an attractive genealogy. The term appropriationism reflects the overproduction of reproductions, remakings, reenactments, recreations, revisionings, reconstructings, etc. by copying, imitating, repeating, quoting, plagiarizing, simulating, and adapting pre-existing names, concepts and forms. Appropriationism is discussed—in comparison of appropriation forms and concepts of the 20th century which offer new representations of established knowledge—as a kind of "racing standstill", referring to the acceleration of random, uncontrollable operations in highly mobilized, fluid Western societies that are governed more and more by abstract and unusual forms of control. Unlimited access to the digital archive of creations and easily feasible digital technologies, as well as the priority of newer ideas and creative processes over a perfect masterpiece leads to a hyperactive pace around the past instead of launching new expeditions into unexplored territory that could give visibility to the forgotten ghosts and ignored phantoms of our common myths and ideologies.

== Appropriation art and copyright ==
Appropriation art has resulted in contentious copyright issues regarding its validity under copyright law. The U.S. has been particularly litigious in this respect. A number of case law examples have emerged that investigate the division between transformative works and derivative works.

=== What is fair use? ===
The Copyright Act of 1976 in the United States, provides a defense against copyright infringement when an artist can prove that their use of the underlying work is "fair".

The Act gives four factors to be considered to determine whether a particular use is a fair use:

1. the purpose and character of the use (commercial or educational, transformative or reproductive, political);
2. the nature of the copyrighted work (fictional or factual, the degree of creativity);
3. the amount and substantiality of the portion of the original work used; and
4. the effect of the use upon the market (or potential market) for the original work.

=== Examples of lawsuits ===
Andy Warhol faced a series of lawsuits from photographers whose work he appropriated and silk-screened. Patricia Caulfield, one such photographer, had taken a picture of flowers for a photography demonstration for a photography magazine. Without her permission, Warhol covered the walls of Leo Castelli's New York gallery with his silk-screened reproductions of Caulfield's photograph in 1964. After seeing a poster of Warhol's unauthorized reproductions in a bookstore, Caulfield sued Warhol for violating her rights as the copyright owner, and Warhol made a cash settlement out of court.

In 2021, the Second Circuit held that Warhol's use of a photograph of Prince to create a series of 16 silkscreens and pencil illustrations was not fair use. The photograph, taken by celebrity photographer Lynn Goldsmith, was commissioned in 1981 as an artist reference for Newsweek magazine. In 1984, Warhol used the photograph as a source to create a work for Vanity Fair along with 15 additional pieces. Goldsmith was not made aware of the series until after the musician's death in 2016, when Condé Nast published a tribute featuring one of Warhol's works. In its opinion, the Court held that each of the four "fair use" factors favored Goldsmith, further finding that the works were substantially similar as a matter of law, given that "any reasonable viewer . . . would have no difficulty identifying the [Goldsmith photograph] as the source material for Warhol's Prince Series." The Supreme Court affirmed in a 7–2 decision, holding that the licensing of the Orange Prince for use as a magazine cover did not qualify as fair use of a copyrighted photo taken for use in a magazine, leaving for another day whether the painting itself could qualify as fair use.

On the other hand, Warhol's famous Campbell's Soup Cans are generally held to be a non-infringing fair use of the soup maker's trademark, despite being clearly appropriated, because "the public [is] unlikely to see the painting as sponsored by the soup company or representing a competing product. Paintings and soup cans are not in themselves competing products," according to expert trademark lawyer Jerome Gilson.

Jeff Koons has also confronted issues of copyright due to his appropriation work (see Rogers v. Koons). Photographer Art Rogers brought suit against Koons for copyright infringement in 1989. Koons' work, String of Puppies sculpturally reproduced Rogers' black-and-white photograph that had appeared on an airport greeting card that Koons had bought. Though he claimed fair use and parody in his defense, Koons lost the case, partially due to the tremendous success he had as an artist and the manner in which he was portrayed in the media. The parody argument also failed, as the appeals court drew a distinction between creating a parody of modern society in general and a parody directed at a specific work, finding parody of a specific work, especially of a very obscure one, too weak to justify the fair use of the original.

In October 2006, Koons successfully defended a different work by claiming "fair use". For a seven-painting commission for the Deutsche Guggenheim Berlin, Koons drew on part of a photograph taken by Andrea Blanch titled Silk Sandals by Gucci and published in the August 2000 issue of Allure magazine to illustrate an article on metallic makeup. Koons took the image of the legs and diamond sandals from that photo (omitting other background details) and used it in his painting Niagara, which also includes three other pairs of women's legs dangling surreally over a landscape of pies and cakes.

In his decision, Judge Louis L. Stanton of U.S. District Court found that Niagara was indeed a "transformative use" of Blanch's photograph. "The painting's use does not 'supersede' or duplicate the objective of the original", the judge wrote, "but uses it as raw material in a novel way to create new information, new aesthetics and new insights. Such use, whether successful or not artistically, is transformative."

The detail of Blanch's photograph used by Koons is only marginally copyrightable. Blanch has no rights to the Gucci sandals, "perhaps the most striking element of the photograph", the judge wrote. And without the sandals, only a representation of a woman's legs remains—and this was seen as "not sufficiently original to deserve much copyright protection."

In 2000, Damien Hirst's sculpture Hymn (which Charles Saatchi had bought for a reported £1m) was exhibited in Ant Noises in the Saatchi Gallery. Hirst was sued for breach of copyright over this sculpture. The subject was a 'Young Scientist Anatomy Set' belonging to his son Connor, 10,000 of which are sold a year by Hull (Emms) Toy Manufacturer. Hirst created a 20-foot, six-ton enlargement of the Science Set figure, radically changing the perception of the object. Hirst paid an undisclosed sum to two charities, Children Nationwide and the Toy Trust in an out-of-court settlement. The charitable donation was less than Emms had hoped for. Hirst sold three more copies of his sculpture for similar amounts to the first.

Appropriating a familiar object to make an artwork can prevent the artist claiming copyright ownership. Jeff Koons threatened to sue a gallery under copyright, claiming that the gallery infringed his proprietary rights by selling bookends in the shape of balloon dogs. Koons abandoned that claim after the gallery filed a complaint for declaratory relief stating, "As virtually any clown can attest, no one owns the idea of making a balloon dog, and the shape created by twisting a balloon into a dog-like form is part of the public domain."

In 2008, photojournalist Patrick Cariou sued artist Richard Prince, Gagosian Gallery and Rizzoli books for copyright infringement. Prince had appropriated 40 of Cariou's photos of Rastafari from a book, creating a series of paintings known as Canal Zone. Prince variously altered the photos, painting objects, oversized hands, naked women and male torsos over the photographs, subsequently selling over $10 million worth of the works. In March 2011, a judge ruled in favor of Cariou, but Prince and Gargosian appealed on a number of points. Three judges for the U.S. Court of Appeals upheld the right to an appeal. Prince's attorney argued that "Appropriation art is a well-recognized modern and postmodern art form that has challenged the way people think about art, challenged the way people think about objects, images, sounds, culture." On April 24, 2013, the appeals court largely overturned the original decision, deciding that many of the paintings had sufficiently transformed the original images and were therefore a permitted use. See Cariou v. Prince.

In November 2010, Chuck Close threatened legal action against computer artist Scott Blake for creating a photoshop filter that built images out of dissected Chuck Close paintings. The story was first reported by online arts magazine Hyperallergic, it was reprinted on the front page of Salon.com, and spread rapidly through the web. Kembrew McLeod, author of several books on sampling and appropriation, said in Wired that Scott Blake's art should fall under the doctrine of fair use.

In September 2014, U.S. Court of Appeals for the Seventh Circuit questioned the Second Circuit's interpretation of the fair use doctrine in the Cariou case. Of particular note, the Seventh Circuit noted that "transformative use" is not one of the four enumerated fair use factors but is, rather, simply part of the first fair use factor which looks to the "purpose and character" of the use. The Seventh Circuit's critique lends credence to the argument that there is a split among U.S. courts as to what role "transformativeness" is to play in any fair use inquiry.

In 2013, Andrew Gilden and Timothy Greene published a law review article in The University of Chicago Law Review dissecting the factual similarities and legal differences between the Cariou case and the Salinger v. Colting case, articulating concerns that judges may be creating a fair use "privilege largely reserved for the rich and famous."

== Artists using appropriation ==
The following are notable artists known for their use of pre-existing objects or images with little or no transformation applied to them:

- ABOVE
- Ai Kijima
- Aleksandra Mir
- Andy Warhol
- Banksy
- Barbara Kruger
- Benjamin Edwards
- Bern Porter
- Bill Jones
- Brian Dettmer
- Burhan Dogancay
- Christian Marclay
- Cindy Sherman
- Claes Oldenburg
- Cornelia Sollfrank
- Cory Arcangel
- Craig Baldwin
- Damian Loeb
- Damien Hirst
- David Salle
- Deborah Kass
- Dominique Mulhem
- Dorothy Cross
- Douglas Gordon
- Elaine Sturtevant
- Eric Doeringer
- Fatimah Tuggar
- Felipe Jesus Consalvos
- Genco Gulan
- General Idea
- George Pusenkoff
- Georges Braque
- Gerhard Richter
- Ghada Amer
- Glenn Brown
- Gordon Bennett
- Graham Rawle
- Graig Kreindler
- Greg Colson
- Hank Willis Thomas
- Hans Haacke
- Hans-Peter Feldman
- Herman Braun-Vega
- Hugo Markl
- J. Tobias Anderson
- Jake and Dinos Chapman
- James Cauty
- Jasper Johns
- Jeff Koons
- Igor Kopystiansky
- Svetlana Kopystiansky
- Jim Ricks
- Joan Miró
- Jodi
- John Baldessari
- John McHale
- John Stezaker
- Joseph Cornell
- Joseph Kosuth
- Joy Garnett
- Kaws
- Karen Kilimnik
- Kelley Walker
- Kenneth Goldsmith
- Kurt Schwitters
- Lennie Lee
- Leon Golub
- Louise Lawler
- Luc Tuymans
- Luke Sullivan
- Malcolm Morley
- Marcel Duchamp
- Mark Bloch
- Marcus Harvey
- Mark Divo
- Marlene Dumas
- Martin Arnold
- Matthieu Laurette
- Max Ernst
- Meret Oppenheim
- Mic Neumann
- Michael Landy
- Michel Platnic
- Mike Bidlo
- Mike Kelley
- Miltos Manetas
- Mohammad Rakibul Hasan
- Nancy Spero
- Negativland
- Nikki S. Lee
- Norm Magnusson
- PJ Crook
- Pablo Picasso
- Sigmar Polke
- People Like Us
- Peter Saville
- Philip Taaffe
- Pierre Bismuth
- Pierre Huyghe
- Reginald Case
- Richard Prince
- Rick Prelinger
- Rob Scholte
- Robert Longo
- Robert Rauschenberg
- Shepard Fairey
- Sherrie Levine
- Stephanie Syjuco
- Stewart Home
- System D-128
- Ted Noten
- Thomas Ruff
- Tom Phillips
- Vermibus
- Vik Muniz
- Vikky Alexander
- Vivienne Westwood
- Yasumasa Morimura

== See also ==
- Art intervention
- Assemblage
- Classificatory disputes about art
- Collage
- Conceptual art
- Copies by Vincent van Gogh
- Cultural appropriation
- Decollage
- Fair use
- Found object
- Postmodern art
- Scratch video

== Sources ==
- David Evans, Appropriation: Documents of Contemporary Art, Cambridge: MIT Press 2009
