= Tobias Andersson =

Tobias Andersson may refer to:

- Tobias Andersson (footballer) (born 1994), Swedish footballer
- Tobias Andersson (politician) (born 1996), Swedish politician

== See also ==
- J. Tobias Anderson (born 1971), Swedish artist and filmmaker
