= The Arts Map =

The Arts Map was an international online resource to locate and identify artists and their studios, as well as galleries, art schools, museums, performing arts facilities, and related associations, service organizations, and businesses around the world, which are related to the arts. Public art in communities could be identified. The resource focused especially on the great range of fine arts and things related to them. Using specific names or more generalized selections made in an extensive check-box listing system and combined with the Google Maps application and technology, The Arts Map was used to search for what existed in a specific place, region, or country as well as to look up a subject by name or category. Each entry was created by its subject and an example of their work could be up-loaded. A highly detailed map of the community on each listing page identified the location. The reference tool was created by Robin Colodzin and Jonathan Talbot.

== Professional reception ==
In the May 2010 edition of The Artist's Magazine, which publishes fine art resources, the author of an article on the resource site stated that two prominent collage artists "were coming up empty while looking for new ways of connecting with clients, collectors, curators, and other artists. They realized that they weren't the only artists seeking connections, so they created The Arts Map."

The editor of the fine arts collage trade magazine, Cloth Paper Scissors, led an article about the site with, "When you’re traveling and want to check out the local arts culture, it's fairly easy to find museums and galleries. But artist studios? Not so much... [Robin Colodzin and Jonathan Talbot] have created an online guide to artists around the world...". In another fine arts publication, Art Times, another editor advised her readers to take advantage of the opportunities provided by the resource by opening an account and trying it.

== Use ==
Through unique entries created by the subjects, The Arts Map site enabled viewers to obtain detailed information about many types of fine artists and related institutions and businesses by their location as well as by name and type. Pins in a map displayed by a location search provided access to the subjects and moving one's cursor over the pins identified each. The full listing for a subject is opened with a mouse click. Listings could include images provided by the subject, a description of the subject, information on hours of operation, availability, or access. The subject of the listing could be static or kept as current as the subject chooses with new information. A map presented for each listing pinpointed its location within the community and could be expanded or contracted via a zoom device activated by the reader.

Use of this site enabled travelers to identify and locate artists, museums, performances, galleries, shows, art schools, and local teachers for classes, as well as finding individual art studios. It was useful to artists who were traveling also, as they could find professional peers and supply businesses wherever they happened to be or planned to visit, by using any connection to the World Wide Web.

== Development history ==
The Arts Map site was created as a beta version late in 2009 and was launched on the Internet in mid-January 2010 . Without promotion, by May 2010 it had drawn four thousand listings with sixty-five countries represented in the listings. Listings were expected to rise gradually as knowledge of the site was disseminated among artists, art patrons, curators, museums, schools, and supply businesses. In September 2010 the developers announced that the listings had risen to six thousand listings representing eighty countries.

The founders of the site, Robin Colodzin and Jonathan Talbot, intended it to be a resource which would benefit the entire arts community and that inclusion of all who wished to list was its goal, basic listings were free for artists, art museums, art schools, and art organizations. Plans exist to enable the presentation of event schedules.

== Closure ==
By October 2013 The Arts Map had grown to include more than nine thousand listings in one hundred and seven countries, but despite that and the accolades garnered, the effort required to maintain the site "consumed more time and creative energy" than its founders had anticipated and they closed the site, replacing it with an announcement thanking all who had participated in the project. The announcement ended with the words, "We are in our studios making art."
