= David Ratcliff =

American painter

David Ratcliff (born 1970 in Los Angeles.) is a painter based in Los Angeles. His work involves spray painting on collages using appropriated images.

== Early life and education ==
David Ratcliff was born in Los Angeles, California, in 1970. He studied at the Pratt Institute in New York, where he earned a Bachelor of Fine Arts (BFA) degree in 1992.

== Career ==
Ratcliff's early work featured spray-painted stencils that appeared to compete for space on the canvas. Over time, his style evolved to incorporate more complex and abstract compositions. His work has been exhibited at prominent commercial galleries such as Mary Boone Gallery in New York and Peres Projects in Berlin. Additionally, his pieces were part of the USA Today exhibition at the Royal Academy in London.

Ratcliff's art is included in several significant collections, including the Saatchi Gallery, Frank Cohen Museum of Contemporary Art in Manchester, and the Los Angeles County Museum of Art.. He is represented by Team Gallery in New York and Maureen Paley in London. His artwork has been sold at Phillips de Pury & Company and Sotheby's.

== Exhibitions ==
=== Solo exhibitions ===
2011

- Portraits, Team Gallery, New York, and NY

2010

- Ghost Paintings, Galerie Rodolphe Janssen, Brussels, and Belgium
- Bsckground, Honor Fraser Gallery, Los Angeles, and CA

2009

- Maureen Paley, London, and England

2008

- Defect's Mirror, Team Gallery, New York, and NY

2007

- Tomio Koyama Gallery, Tokyo, and Japan
- Cosmetic Surgery, Team Gallery, New York, and NY
- Bob Loblaw, Galerie Rodolphe Janssen, Brussels, and Belgium

2005

- LISTE, Basel, Switzerland (under the auspices of Team Gallery, and New York

=== Group exhibitions ===
2011

- The shortest distance between 2 points is often intolerable, curated by Andrew Berardini, Brand New Gallery, Milan, and Italy

2010

- Tomio Koyama Gallery, Tokyo, and Japan
- David Ratcliff, Noriko Furunishi, Tomio Koyama Gallery, Kyoto, and Japan

2009

- The Night Goat Demands Reparations, curated by Adam Miller, Art Center College of Design, Pasadena, California
- Cave #1, curated by Bob Nickas, Gresham's Ghost, New York, NY
- Light Motive, Galerie Suzanne Tarasiéve, Paris, France
- Dark Summer, Galerie Rodolphe Janssen, Brussels, Belgium

2008

- History Keeps Me Awake at Night: A Genealogy of Wojnarowicz, PPOW, New York, NY
- That was then... This is now PS1, New York, NY
- The Hidden Maureen Paley, London, England

2007

- Post-Rose: Artists in and out of the Hazard Park Complex, curated by Sterling Ruby, Galerie Christian Nagel, Berlin
- Painting as Fact, Fact as Fiction, curated by Bob Nickas, de Pury & Luxembourg, Zurich, Switzerland

2006

- The Gold Standard, curated by Bob Nickas and Walead Beshty, PS1, New York, NY
- The Monty Hall Problem, curated by Slater Bradley, Blum & Poe, Los Angeles, CA
- LAXed: New Painting from L.A., Peres Projects, Berlin, Germany
- Loveless, Team Gallery, New York, NY
- I Love My Scene: Scene Two, curated by José Freire, Mary Boone Gallery, New York, NY

2005

- The Pantagruel Syndrome, curated by Francesco Bonami and Carolyn Christov-Bakargiev, Turin Triennial, Turin, Italy
- 5 X U, Team Gallery, New York, NY

=== Public collections ===
- Frank Cohen MOCA Manchester, UK
- Los Angeles County Museum of Art, CA, USA
- Jumex Collection, Mexico City
- Saatchi Collection, London, UK

== Personal life ==
He has a daughter.

== See also ==
- Team Gallery
- Maureen Paley
