= Ai Kijima =

Japanese textile artist (born 1970)

Ai Kijima, born in 1970 in Tokyo, Japan, is a contemporary artist residing in New York City. She is noted for her use of traditional quilting techniques to create colorful fabric collages from found materials such as bed sheets, vintage kimono, t-shirts, curtains, and dishtowels.

== Life and art ==
Burn It Up, 2006. Fused, machine quilted. Recycled materials including bed sheets, curtain, pillow case, clothes, apron, handkerchief, tablecloth. 104”x 91”

Ai Kijima (born 1970) was born and raised in Tokyo, Japan. At an early age, Kijima's grandmother taught her how to sew, crochet, and knit, and she soon developed a lifelong love for fabric. Now, Kijima's works incorporate vintage fabrics and other materials that she collected over the years from flea markets and thrift shops in the United States and Japan.

While a high school senior, Kijima became a foreign exchange student in a small town in Wisconsin. Only after Kijima's high school art teacher in Wisconsin recommended art school did Kijima consider pursuing art in her education and as a profession.

Following her student exchange in Wisconsin, Kijima moved to Chicago to attend the School of the Art Institute of Chicago. Kijima graduated with a BFA degree in 2002, and later earned her MFA in Fiber and Material Studies in 2005.

Kijima's artwork is notable for her use of appropriation and traditional quilting techniques to create colorful, chaotic fabric collages from found materials, including bed sheets, vintage kimono, t-shirts, picnic blankets, curtains, pillowcases, and dishtowels. Many of Kijima's works incorporate familiar pop culture iconography in ambiguous, often poetic, ways. One ongoing series of works is entitled "Erehwon" ("Nowhere" spelled backwards), which suggests the contradictory nature of the world portrayed in Kijima's art.

Kijima's work has been widely exhibited. While she was still attending art school, one of Kijima's pieces appeared in an exhibition focused on the intersection of art and intellectual property law, Illegal Art. Her first solo exhibition, "Mediated Pop," was held at the Peter Miller Gallery in Chicago from September 9 - October 15, 2005.

In 2006, Kijima moved from Chicago to New York City, where she is a studio artist represented by Franklin Parrasch Gallery. Kijima's second solo exhibition, "Fused and Quilted," was held at Franklin Parrasch Gallery in New York from September 12 - October 18, 2006. Subsequently, Kijima's work has appeared in a number of public collections and exhibitions around the world, including a solo exhibition of newer work at Hilger Contemporary in Vienna from January 12, 2010, to February 23, 2010.
