= Roderick Slater =

American artist (1937–2019)

Roderick W. Slater
- Born: April 24, 1937; Goodrich, Michigan
- Died: June 25, 2019 (aged 82); Lexington, Virginia
- Occupation: Artist
- Years active: 1970–2019
- Known for: Collage

Roderick W. Slater (April 24, 1937 – June 25, 2019) was an American artist. His works include paintings, etchings, drypoints, and collographs and collages. He is best known for mixed media works combining painting and collage. Slater's collages, composed on rectilinear grids, often include three-dimensional components and fragments of antique paper.

== Early life ==
Born in Goodrich, Michigan, Slater studied art at the National Academy of Design School of Art in New York City.

== Work ==
Two works by Roderick Slater are included in the collection of the Portland Museum of Art in Portland, Maine. Galleries which have exhibited Slater works include the Ann Jacobs Gallery in Atlanta, Georgia, Dryden Galleries, Providence, Rhode Island, Plum Gallery in Kensington, Maryland, and Frost Gully Gallery in Maine. Slater's works have also been sold by auction houses such as Christie's in New York City (August 9, 2005), Skinner Inc. in Boston, Massachusetts (May 15, 2009), Luper Auctions, Richmond, Virginia, and Julia Auctions in Fairfield, Maine. Slater's work Mnemonic Device was included in Paste and Pixels, a 2001 exhibition at Core Gallery in New Paltz, NY.

Most recently, Roderick Slater had a two-person show at the Staunton Augusta Art Center in Staunton, VA with his protégée Sarah Bean. The show was titled "Promises We Make To Ourselves: A 15 year dialogue between mentor and student"

A series of black and white drawings by Roderick Slater illustrates the book Up Here in Maine by Gerald E. Lewis, published by Pittsfield Publishers in 1975.

Slater has been cited as an influence by other contemporary artists, including noted American collage artists Jonathan Talbot and Sarah Bean.

== Death ==
Slater died on June 25, 2019, in Lexington, VA.
