= Young Swedes SDU =

Youth wing of the Sweden Democrats

Young Swedes SDU Ungsvenskarna SDU
- Spokesperson: Denice Westerberg
- Founded: 1 October 2015
- Preceded by: Sweden Democratic Youth
- Headquarters: Stockholm, Sweden
- Membership: c. 800 members (2016)
- Ideology: Swedish nationalism Conservatism; Social conservatism Euroscepticism; National conservatism Economic liberalism
- Mother party: Sweden Democrats
- European affiliation: European Young Conservatives
- Nordic affiliation: Nordisk Friheds Ungdom (NFU)
- Website: ungsvenskarna.se

Young Swedes (Swedish: Ungsvenskarna [ˈɵ̂ŋˌsvɛnskaɳa ɛsdeːˈʉː]) have been the youth section within the Sweden Democrats since 1 October 2015. National spokesperson since October 2024 is Denice Westerberg. According to Jimmie Åkesson, the party leader of the Sweden Democrats, the wing's main goal is to "attract young people to vote for the party". The section itself says that its main task is to "prepare young people to become future Sweden Democratic politicians." They use Engelbrektsbågen as a symbol and describes itself as democratic and socially conservative with a nationalist outlook.

Unlike the former youth section Sweden Democratic Youth, the Young Swedes requires that its members are also card carrying members of the Sweden Democrats and follow the party's rules on conduct and political communication. The minimum age for membership in the section is 13 years. A difference compared to the other youth section in Sweden is that the delegates to the Young Swedes congresses are not elected by the sections members, instead being appointed by its national board.

== History ==
The new youth section was founded after the mother party broke ties with their original youth organization (SDU) after the organisation was accused of racism and ties with extremist groups. Relations between the SD and the SDU began to sour after the election of Gustav Kasselstrand who represented a more hardline ethno-nationalist branch within the party. The conflict culminated during the original youth organization congress in September 2015, when the election committees candidate Jessica Ohlson won the battle for the position of national spokesperson against the Sweden Democrat leaderships' preferred candidates Tobias Andersson and Dennis Dioukarev. A few hours after the congress, the Sweden Democrats decided to break with their youth organization, and a few days later the entire organizations leadership was expelled from the party with the SD issuing a timetable for all other members of the SDU to dissociate themselves with the old youth wing or risk expulsion from the party.

On 1 October 2015, the Sweden Democrats launched their new youth section with Tobias Andersson as national spokesperson.

== Ideology and structure ==
In-line with the mother party's beliefs, the Young Swedes SDU articulates its outlook as national conservative and nationalist. It's stated aim is to introduce young Swedish citizens to conservatism and Swedish nationalism. Unlike other party youth leagues, the Young Swedes SDU is not independent of the Sweden Democrats and functions as an internal group within the party for younger members and representatives. In 2023, the Young Swedes SDU adopted a resolution calling for Swedish withdrawal (Swexit) from the European Union.

== Symbols ==
Both the name "Ungsvenskarna" and the symbol Engelbrektsbågen were previously used by the current Moderate Youth League after the General Electoral League (Allmänna Valmansförbundet) (the current Moderate Party) broke with their former youth organization SNF, since they had begun to approach nazism.

The Young Swedes national spokesperson Tobias Andersson expressed in an interview that the Moderate Youth League would probably "have problems" with the use of the name and symbol, but that "there will be some talk about this and that it's positive for us". The Moderate Youth League's chairman at the time, Rasmus Törnblom, for his part, announced that his youth league was reviewing the possibilities of legally questioning the use of the name and symbol.

== National spokesperson ==
- Tobias Andersson, 2015–2022
- Emil Eneblad, 2022–2024
- Denice Westerberg, 2024–now
