= Rita Boley Bolaffio =

Italian artist

Rita Boley Bolaffio (née Luzzatto; Trieste, Italy, 7 June 1898 - New York City, United States, 20 May 1995) was an Italian artist who was instrumental in reintroducing collage and decoupage into the United States.

== Early years ==
Rita was born Margherita Luzzatto in Trieste, Italy to Angelo Luzzatto and Olga Senigaglia.

Her family moved to Vienna, where she passed World War I. She studied art under Josef Hoffmann at the Kunstgewerbeschule. She also studied violin under the famous violinist František Ondříček at the Neues Wiener Konservatorium. She did textile designs for the renowned Wiener Werkstaette.

In 1919 she married Oscar Bolaffio, an architect and engineer, and cousin of painter Vittorio Bolaffio. They moved to Milan in 1928, where Rita became one of the first horsewomen in Italy, riding sidesaddle, and won the "Premio Ciglione della Malpensa" (the Ciglione della Malpensa Prize) in 1936.

== American career ==
Machine for Writing Poetry, circa 1955

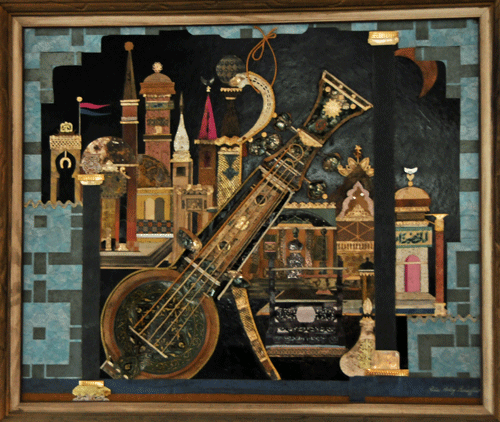
Arabesque, circa 1963

In 1939, the Fascist anti-Jewish policies forced the family to flee to America. She began a career as an artist, specializing in imaginative collages that were displayed in the windows of most major department stores in America, including Lord & Taylor, Saks Fifth Avenue, Bergdorf Goodman, Neiman Marcus, Carson Pirie Scott, and many more, as well as many private commissions. She regularly contributed covers for such magazines as Harper's Bazaar, Vogue, Town & Country, Good Housekeeping, and Woman's Day.

Boley Bolaffio was best known for her dramatic window displays in New York City. Additionally, she had many awards and one-woman exhibitions at museums and galleries (e.g. J.L. Hudson Gallery, Detroit, Guild Hall Museum, East Hampton, N.Y. and the Columbia Museum of Art in South Carolina). Her 1941 collection of decoupage works at the James Pendleton Gallery in New York City was favorably reviewed in The New York Times, and in 1950 that same newspaper described her as a "leading exponent" of decoupage. Her work is included in European reference works on modern art.

She received the Premio di Sorrento 1965 for her poem "Nell'afa".

== Personal life ==
Boley Bolaffio was married to Orville F. Boley. They had two sons: Bruno A. Boley and Lucius R. Boley.
