= Robert Nickle =

American artist (1919–1980)

- Born: Robert Wienert Nickle; May 22, 1919; Saginaw, Michigan, U.S.
- Died: November 12, 1980 (aged 61)
- Education: University of Michigan
- Occupation: Artist

Abstract collage by Robert Nickle

Robert Wienert Nickle (May 22, 1919 – November 12, 1980) was a 20th-century American artist known primarily for his "street scrap" collage work.

Nickle was born in Saginaw, Michigan. In 1943, he graduated from the University of Michigan where he studied architecture and design. He enlisted in the Navy that May, and served in the South Pacific.

Nickle worked and taught primarily in Chicago, Illinois where he was affiliated with the New Bauhaus under László Moholy-Nagy, then with the University of Illinois at Chicago (UIC).

== Exhibits ==
Robert Nickle's work is included in the permanent collections of the Art Institute of Chicago, David and Alfred Smart Gallery, Whitney Museum of American Art, the Albright-Knox Art Gallery, the Indianapolis Museum, Smithsonian Museum, Carnegie Institute Museum and the National Gallery in Washington.
