= Felipe Jesus Consalvos =

Cuban-American artist

Felipe Jesus Consalvos (1891 – c. 1960) was a Cuban-American cigar roller and artist, known for his posthumously discovered body of artwork based on the vernacular tradition of cigar-band collage.

== Life ==
Felipe Jesus Consalvos, Dream the Rest (FJC 638), c. 1920–1960.

Felipe Jesus Consalvos was born near Havana, Cuba in 1891 and grew up on the farm of his mother's family. He married, moved to Havana, and later emigrated with his family to Miami around 1920, eventually moving to Brooklyn and finally to Philadelphia, where he is believed to have died sometime in the 1950s or 1960s. Consalvos worked for much of his life as a factory cigar roller.

== Art ==
A large body of Consalvos' art work was discovered in 1983 at a Philadelphia garage sale. The body of work consists of over 800 collages on paper, found photographs, musical instruments, furniture, and other objects. Consalvos' playful and often subversively political work—on which he is thought to have collaborated with his son, Jose Felipe Consalvos -- appropriated cigar bands and cigar-box paper, along with magazine images, family photographs, postage stamps, and cut-up money. Following extensive conservation work, Consalvos' work was first exhibited in a solo show in 2004 at Fleisher/Ollman Gallery in Philadelphia. Subsequently, his work has appeared in a number of public exhibitions and collections, including the Philadelphia Museum of Art, the American Folk Art Museum, and the Art Institute of Chicago.

Consalvos has been described by art critic Roberta Smith as a "self-starting modernist" who is "nearly on a par with folk-art greats like Henry Darger, Martin Ramirez and James Castle." According to Smith, Consalvos' work "belongs to the collage continuum from Hannah Höch to Barbara Kruger."

== Collections ==
- Art Institute of Chicago
- Harvard Art Museums
- Koehler Foundation
- Minneapolis Institute of Art
- Philadelphia Museum of Art
