= Francois Colos =

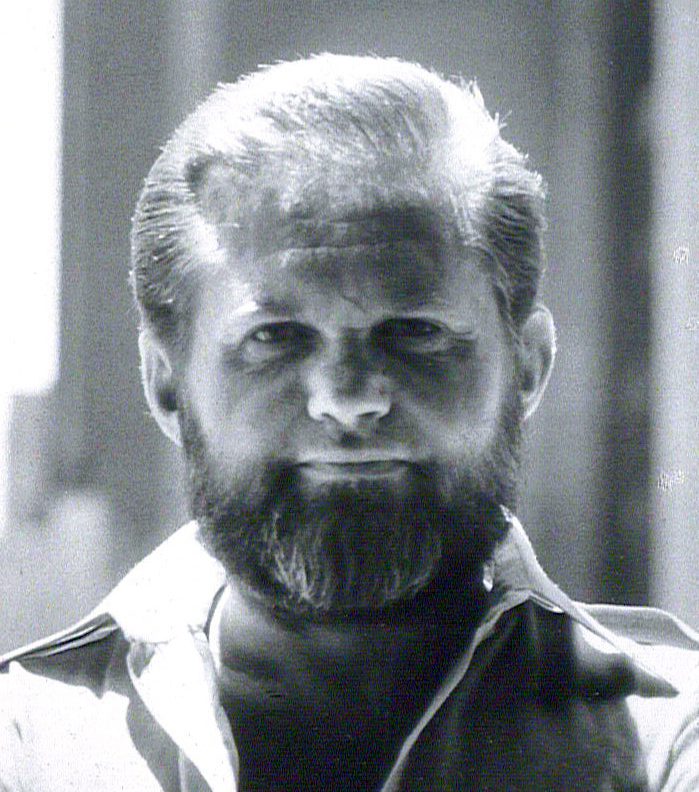
- Born: 1933 Budapest
- Died: 1989 (aged 55–56) New York City
- Areas: Writer, Artist

François Colos (born Ferencz Szalay; Hungary, 1933–Manhattan, 1989) was a Hungarian-born designer and artist, established in the US. In addition to his long career as a designer for French and American newspapers, magazines, and companies, he was the author of a 14-year collage diary (1976–1989).

== Career ==
He began studying graphic art and engraving techniques in 1947, but was arrested by the political arm of the police in 1951, and sent to a coal mine deep in the Gulag. He was freed in 1956, during the Hungarian revolution and arrived in Paris, France in 1957, to begin studying at the Ecole des Beaux Arts and the Ecole du Louvre.

In 1958 he illustrated several books and magazines, winning several prizes in Belgium, England, and Germany.

In 1959 he started working in his main field, collage – a technique which would lead to his second love – photography.

In 1960 he received his first photographic assignment in Rome, Italy, and in 1961 participated at the Cannes Film Festival.

In 1964, after two short film features in England and Canary Islands, he started a 5-year association with French television, introducing a new graphic style.

After frequent study trips through Europe, Asia, and Africa, in 1966 he visited the United States and settled permanently in Manhattan in 1970, as a free-lance artist. His career was consolidated by further drawings and concepts which brought him numerous prizes and important clients: Time, Life, The New York Times, Playboy, Hustler, Exxon, Mobil, Texaco, Xerox, McGraw Hill, Harpers and Newsweek. In 1973 he received the silver medal in the Nikon International Photo-Contest.

=== Book published ===
In 1974 he published, "The Student who Became King in Spite of Himself", his first book in English with Holt Rinehart & Winston incorporating his collage style into the illustrations. He continued his work and, in 1976, he began work on his 'Diary' – a large collection of collages which ended in 1989, when Francois Szalay-Colos died at New York Hospital, Manhattan. He was survived by his wife, Michelle.
