= Jonathan Talbot =

American painter

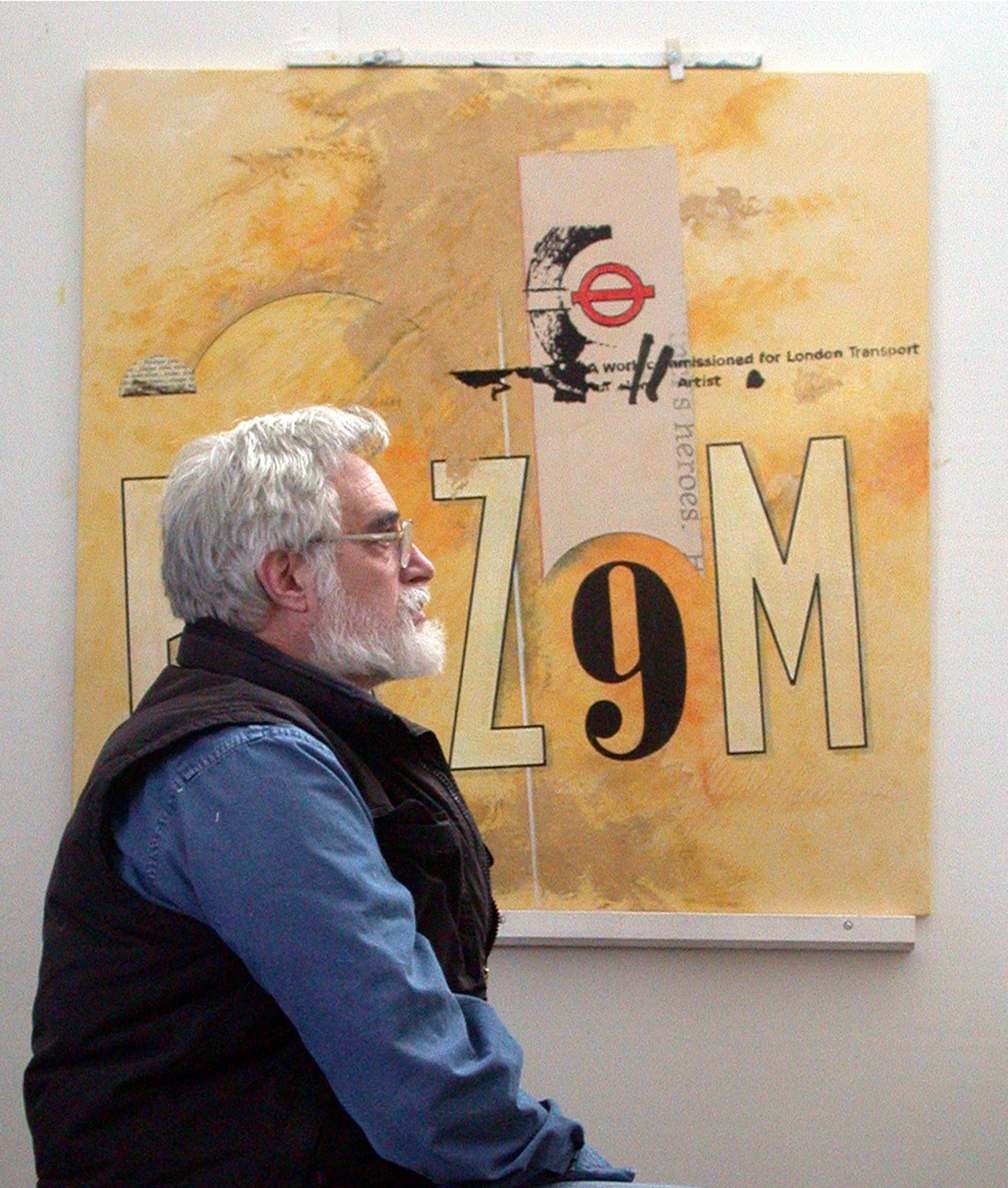
- photograph of Jonathan Talbot before one of his works
- Born: November 14, 1939 (age 86)
- Known for: Collage, collage technique development, multi-dimensional collage-constructions etchings, printmaking, paintings, author
- Website: talbot1.com

Jonathan Talbot (born November 14, 1939) is an American collage artist, painter, and printmaker. He also is the creator of an innovative collage technique that eliminates liquid adhesives from the collage assembly process. His technique is the subject of his book, Collage: A New Approach.

Talbot's works have been exhibited at The National Academy and the Museum of Modern Art in New York. His artwork has represented the United States in exhibitions sponsored by the U. S. State Department as well as by the Smithsonian Institution. His works are included in permanent museum collections in United States, Canada, and Europe. His studio is in Warwick, New York.

Every year Talbot schedules workshops that he conducts for artists who wish to study collage, his techniques, and related subjects. They are hosted at various locations around the United States and some are free exhibits sponsored by local organizations.

Talbot is best known for his collages and multi-dimensional collage-constructions, as well as, for his oils, watercolors, and etchings.

== Early life and musical works ==
Talbot is the son of artist, Helen Talbot, who exhibited in New York in the early 1930s, and he was raised on a family farm in upstate New York in Putnam County.

A youthful portrait of Jonathan Talbot was painted by the noted artist and illustrator, Arthur Lidov, and it appeared on the cover of the December 1947 issue of The American Mercury magazine. Shortly thereafter Talbot was enrolled in the Hessian Hills School founded by Elizabeth Moos, a notably progressive school in Croton-on-Hudson, New York, where the educational focus was on the arts.

He spent many summers during the 1950s living in the village of Menemsha on Martha's Vineyard, an island which at that time, was the summer home of many artists and members of the creative arts. Painter Thomas Hart Benton, lyricist E. Y. "Yip" Harburg, the author of Brother Can you Spare a Dime, and Peter Coyote, who would become an actor, were among the influences upon Talbot's early artistic efforts.

Talbot's first creative efforts were in music. A self-taught musician, Talbot's musical career included performances at Carnegie Hall and Fillmore East as well as numerous other 1960s venues. He recorded two albums as leader of the New York Electric String Ensemble, one for ESP-Disk. and one for Columbia Records.

In 1970, he married Marsha Goldstein, moved to San Francisco, and turned his talents toward the visual arts.

== Visual arts career begins ==
After a brief period studying etching at the San Francisco Academy of Art, Talbot started to exhibit and sell his works, at first, limited to etchings and paintings. Talbot belonged to the San Francisco Artists Cooperative, which was a branch of the Art Students League of San Francisco and also sold his works on street corners near Fisherman's Wharf.

Within a few years, Talbot and his wife moved to Los Angeles. Later, making a return to the east coast, they moved to New Jersey where he maintained studios in Morristown, Montville, and South Orange. While in New Jersey, Talbot exhibited his works at the renowned professional and community art associations, the outdoor art shows, and the regional galleries that flourished within the preeminent New York metropolitan art market.

During 1973 the Talbots relocated to Susquehanna County, Pennsylvania following the birth of their first child. They have two children, Loren and Garret.

== Solo shows begin ==
1973 is the year of Jonathan Talbot's first important solo show, which took place at the Friendship Library of Fairleigh Dickinson University in Madison. His next solo show also was held in Madison, at Drew University during 1974.

== Representation at New York galleries and museums ==
Talbot first showed his work in New York at Associated American Artists—AAA—as it is known internationally, during 1975. This is the same year when an etching of Talbot's was included in an exhibition at the Museum of Modern Art in New York. In May of that year, the Talbots moved to Warwick in Orange County, New York, to be closer to the galleries in Manhattan that were exhibiting his work. Between 1975 and 1981 Talbot sold etchings through numerous galleries around the United States, as well.

In 1981 his works were included in exhibitions at the Schenectady Museum, The Albany Institute of History and Art, and at the National Academy of Design in New York.

== National Academy of Design Award ==
A painting by Jonathan Talbot, "Waterfront Buildings, Troy, New York", was awarded the National Academy's Ranger Fund Purchase Award in 1982. Through the fund, the painting awards jury of the academy selects one painting to honor among their exhibition and the recipient is announced at its annual awards ceremony. The painting is purchased from the artist and donated to a nationally recognized museum, also selected by the awards committee.

This award is intended to encourage public interest in American painters and it plays a crucial role in building the American collections of many public art institutions.

About this time Talbot met the veteran collage artist, Roderick Slater, who encouraged him to begin experimenting with the medium of collage. This influence led him to the art form that has become his most significant.

== Museum solo shows begin ==
1984 is the year of Talbot's first solo museum exhibitions. "The Collages of Jonathan Talbot" was held at the Everhart Museum in Scranton, Pennsylvania in May and "The World of Jonathan Talbot" was held at The Byer Museum of the Arts in Evanston, Illinois in September.

== New York solo shows begin ==
In 1986 Talbot had his first of four solo shows at the Gimpel and Weitzenhoffer Gallery in Manhattan —the others followed in 1987, 1990, and 1992. Talbot also showed extensively at other venues during that period.

In 1998 Talbot's fifth solo exhibition in New York, "Collages from the Flamenco Series" was held at Joseph Rickards Gallery. This is also the year that the first edition of Talbot's book, Collage: A New Approach, was published, which is still available through Amazon Books.

== International recognition and lecture series ==
Since 1998 Talbot's works have been the subject of solo museum exhibitions on both the east and west coasts of the United States and he lectures and teaches widely in the United States, Canada, and Europe.

== Collections holding works ==
Among the collections that have acquired the work of Jonathan Talbot are,

- Academy of Art University, San Francisco, California
- Beach Museum of Art, Manhattan, Kansas
- Centro Murciano de Arte Gráfico y de la Estampa Contemporanea, Caravaca de la Cruz, Spain
- Coos Art Museum, Coos Bay, Oregon
- Davidson Print Collection, Elon College, Elon, North Carolina
- Drew University, Madison, New Jersey
- Eastern Connecticut State University, Willimantic, Connecticut
- Everhart Museum, Scranton, Pennsylvania
- Fairleigh Dickinson University, Madison, New Jersey
- Free Library of Philadelphia, Philadelphia, Pennsylvania
- Georgetown University Fine Print Collection, Washington, D.C.
- Housatonic Museum of Art, Bridgeport, Connecticut
- Longview Museum of Fine Arts, Longview, Texas
- Maitland Art Center, Maitland, Florida
- Middletown Thrall Library, Middletown, New York
- Montclair Art Museum, Montclair, New Jersey
- Musée ArtColle, Plemet, France
- NCS Teaching Collection: Kent State University, Kent, Ohio
- Newark Museum, Newark, New Jersey
- Oakwood Friends School, Poughkeepsie, New York
- Provincetown History Preservation Project, Provincetown, Massachusetts
- Sacred Heart University, Fairfield, Connecticut
- San Diego Museum of Art, San Diego, California
- Smith College Museum, Northampton, Massachusetts
- Toronto Central Library, Toronto, Ontario, Canada
- Muzeum Okręgowe w Toruniu, Toruń, Poland

== Arts map ==
Talbot collaborated with Robin Colodzin as they created The Arts Map, an electronic, international reference tool that enabled viewers to obtain detailed information about many types of artists and related institutions and businesses by their location as well as by name and type. The project was begun in late 2009 and was published until October 2013.

== Books by Talbot ==
Talbot has authored three books. Two are on collage or related skills for artists and one is a guide for achieving success by artists in general. They are,

- The Artist's Marketing and Action Plan Workbook, Jonathan Talbot with Geoffry Howard and illustrated by Loel Barr
- Acrylic Image Transfer: A Handbook for Artists, Jonathan Talbot with Jessica Lawrence
- Collage: A New Approach, Collage without liquid adhesives, Jonathan Talbot, which is in its fifth edition

== Books about Talbot ==
In May 2014, a book by Deborah K. Snider was published on the collages of Jonathan Talbot, the history of collage, and Jonathan's place in that history. The publication includes full-color reproductions of thirty-three of Talbot's works and the artist's commentaries on them and their evolution.

- The Collages of Jonathan Talbot, Snider, Deborah K., with essay by Andrew Marvick [Kent-Marvick], Royal Fireworks Press, May, 2014

== See also ==
- an annotated bibliography on the artist's website
- Listing in Who's Who in American Art
- Listing in The Biographical Encyclopedia of American Painters, Sculptors, and Engravers of the United States, Colonial Era to 2002, Volume Two, 2002, H. H. Caplan, Bob Creps, Howard Creps, Dealer's Choice Books, ISBN 0-966852613, 9780966852615
- Collage of Conscience, Orange Magazine, January and February, 1989 pp. 40–44
- Collage Techniques, Gerald Brommer, Watson Guptill - ISBN 0-8230-0655-7
