= Denice Westerberg =

Swedish politician (born 2002)

- Westerberg in 2026

Member of the Riksdag
- Incumbent
- Assumed office 28 September 2026
- Constituency: Västra Götaland County South

Personal details
- Born: 6 July 2002 (age 24)
- Party: Sweden Democrats

Denice Angelina Westerberg (born 6 July 2002) is a Swedish politician who was elected member of the Riksdag in 2026. She has served as chairwoman of the Young Swedes SDU since 2024.
