= Elaine Sturtevant =

American artist

- Sturtevant, 1989 by Timothy Greenfield-Sanders
- Born: Elaine Frances Horan; August 23, 1924; Lakewood, Ohio, United States
- Died: May 7, 2014 (aged 89); Paris, France
- Known for: Appropriation art, conceptual art
- Awards: La Biennale di Venezia Golden Lion, 2011

Elaine Frances Sturtevant (née Horan; August 23, 1924 – May 7, 2014), also known professionally as Sturtevant, was an American artist. She achieved recognition for her carefully inexact repetitions of other artists' works.

== Early life and education ==
Elaine Frances Horan was born on August 23, 1924, in Lakewood, Ohio, near Cleveland. She earned a bachelor's degree in psychology from the University of Iowa, followed by a master's in the field from Teachers College of Columbia University. In New York, she also studied at the Art Students League.

== Work ==
Study for Stella Arundel Castle (1989) at the National Gallery of Art in 2022, a near-identical reproduction by Sturtevant of a painting by Frank Stella

Sturtevant's earliest known paintings were made in New York in the late 1950s. In these works, she sliced tubes of paint open, flattened them, and attached them to canvas. Most of these works contain fragments from tubes of several colors of paint, some have additional pencil scribbles and daubs of paint. Sturtevant was close friends with Robert Rauschenberg and Jasper Johns, both of whom own paintings from this period.

In 1964, by memorization only, she began to manually reproduce (or "repeat") paintings and objects created by her contemporaries with results that can immediately be identified with an original, at a point that turned the concept of originality on its head. She initially focused on works by such American artists as Johns, Roy Lichtenstein, Frank Stella, Claes Oldenburg, James Rosenquist, and Andy Warhol. Warhol gave Sturtevant one of his silkscreens so she could produce her own versions of his Flowers paintings, Warhol Flowers (1969–70). When asked about his own technique, Warhol once said, "I don't know. Ask Elaine." After a Johns flag painting that was a component of Rauschenberg's combine Short Circuit was stolen, Rauschenberg commissioned Sturtevant to paint a reproduction, which was subsequently incorporated into the combine. In the late 1960s, Sturtevant concentrated on replicating works by Joseph Beuys and Marcel Duchamp. In a 1967 photograph, she and Rauschenberg pose as a nude Adam and Eve, roles originally played by Duchamp and Brogna Perlmutter in a 1924 picture shot by Man Ray.

In the early 1970s, Sturtevant stopped exhibiting art for more than 10 years. Pushback on her conceptual practice had begun, in fact, with Oldenburg and his dealer, Leo Castelli, being publicly upset at her restaging of Oldenburg's The Store (1961) as The Store of Claes Oldenburg in 1967, just a few blocks away from where the original had been staged. As critic Eleanor Heartney wrote, "Sturtevant found her work met with resistance and even hostility. Her frustration culminated with a 1973 show at the Everson Museum of Art in Syracuse, New York. Titled “Sturtevant: Studies done for Beuys’ Action and objects, Duchamps’ etc. Including film,” the exhibition encompassed three rooms of objects and three of her early films that played off Warhol, Beuys and Duchamp. It was met with a deafening silence from the art world, precipitating her withdrawal."

From the early 1980s she focused on the next generation of artists, including Robert Gober, Anselm Kiefer, Paul McCarthy, and Felix Gonzalez-Torres. She mastered painting, sculpture, photography and film in order to produce a full range of copies of the works of her chosen artists. In most cases, her decision to start copying an artist happened before those artists achieved broader recognition. Nearly all of the artists she chose to copy are today considered iconic for their time or style. This has given rise to discussions among art critics on how it had been possible for Sturtevant to identify those artists at such an early stage.

In 1991, Sturtevant presented an entire show consisting of her repetition of Warhol's Flowers series.

Her later works mainly focus on reproductions in the digital age. Sturtevant commented on her work at her 2012 retrospective Sturtevant: Image over Image at the Moderna Museet: "What is currently compelling is our pervasive cybernetic mode, which plunks copyright into mythology, makes origins a romantic notion, and pushes creativity outside the self. Remake, reuse, reassemble, recombine—that's the way to go."

After feeling misunderstood by critics and artists, Sturtevant stopped making art for a decade. Her 2014 exhibition at MoMA was the first significant exhibition in the US in decades. Her last large-scale installation, The House of Horrors, has been on temporary display at the Musée d'Art Moderne de la Ville de Paris since June 2015.

"In some ways, style is her medium. She was the first postmodern artist—before the fact—and also the last", according to Peter Eleey, curator of her 2014 MoMA exhibition.

== Later life ==
One of Sturtevant's final acts of subversion was her recurring performance of a visiting artist's public lecture. The lecture was not based on any particular artist, but on the meta-tropes of everything that can go wrong (and does) in a typical visiting artist's lecture. The crux of the lecture is Sturtevant's portrayal of a bitter, possibly drunk, late-career artist who cannot get any of her presentation media to work properly. The slides get stuck, the videos won't cue, and the audio won't work. The lecture ends with Sturtevant screaming obscenities at her hapless studio assistant in the tech booth and storming off the stage.

Sturtevant died on May 7, 2014, in Paris, where she had been living and working since the early 1990s. She was 89.

== Exhibitions ==
Sturtevant had her first her solo exhibition in 1965 at the Bianchini Gallery, in New York. In 1975, a show was dedicated to her by the German art dealer Reinhard Onnasch in his New York gallery.

Solo exhibitions of her work have since been mounted at:

- Württembergischer Kunstverein Stuttgart (1992)
- Deichtorhallen, Hamburg (1992)
- Villa Arson, Nice (1993)
- Museum für Moderne Kunst, Frankfurt am Main (2004)
- Musée d'Art Moderne de la Ville de Paris (2010)
- La Biennale di Venezia (2011)
- Moderna Museet (2012)
- Kunsthalle Zurich (2012)
- Serpentine Galleries (2013)
- Museum of Modern Art (2014)
- Sturtevant. Drawing Double Reversal: Museum für Moderne Kunst, Frankfurt am Main/Albertina, Vienna/Hamburger Bahnhof, Berlin
- Museum of Contemporary Art Los Angeles (2015)

== Awards and recognition ==
In 2008, Sturtevant received the Francis J. Greenburger Award.

On June 4, 2011, Sturtevant received the Golden Lion for lifetime achievement at the 54th Venice Biennale.

In September 2013, she was awarded the Kurt Schwitters Prize for Lifetime Achievement by the Sprengel Museum.

Her Warhol Flowers (1964-1971) painting series was cited by The New York Times in 2019 as one of the 25 works of art that defined the contemporary age.

== Art market ==
In 2007, an original Crying Girl by Roy Lichtenstein sold at auction for $78,400; in 2011, Sturtevant's canvas reworking of Crying Girl—the only Sturtevant painting of its kind in existence—sold for $710,500. In 2014, Lichtenstein, Frighten Girl (1966) sold at Christie's for $3.4 million. Shortly after, Warhol Diptych (1973) was sold for $5,093,000 at Christie's in New York.

== See also ==
- Appropriation (art)
- Difference and Repetition
- Marcel Duchamp
- Claes Oldenburg
- Jasper Johns
- Andy Warhol
- Frank Stella
- Joseph Beuys
- Sherrie Levine
