= Tobias Andersson (politician) =

Swedish politician (born 1996)

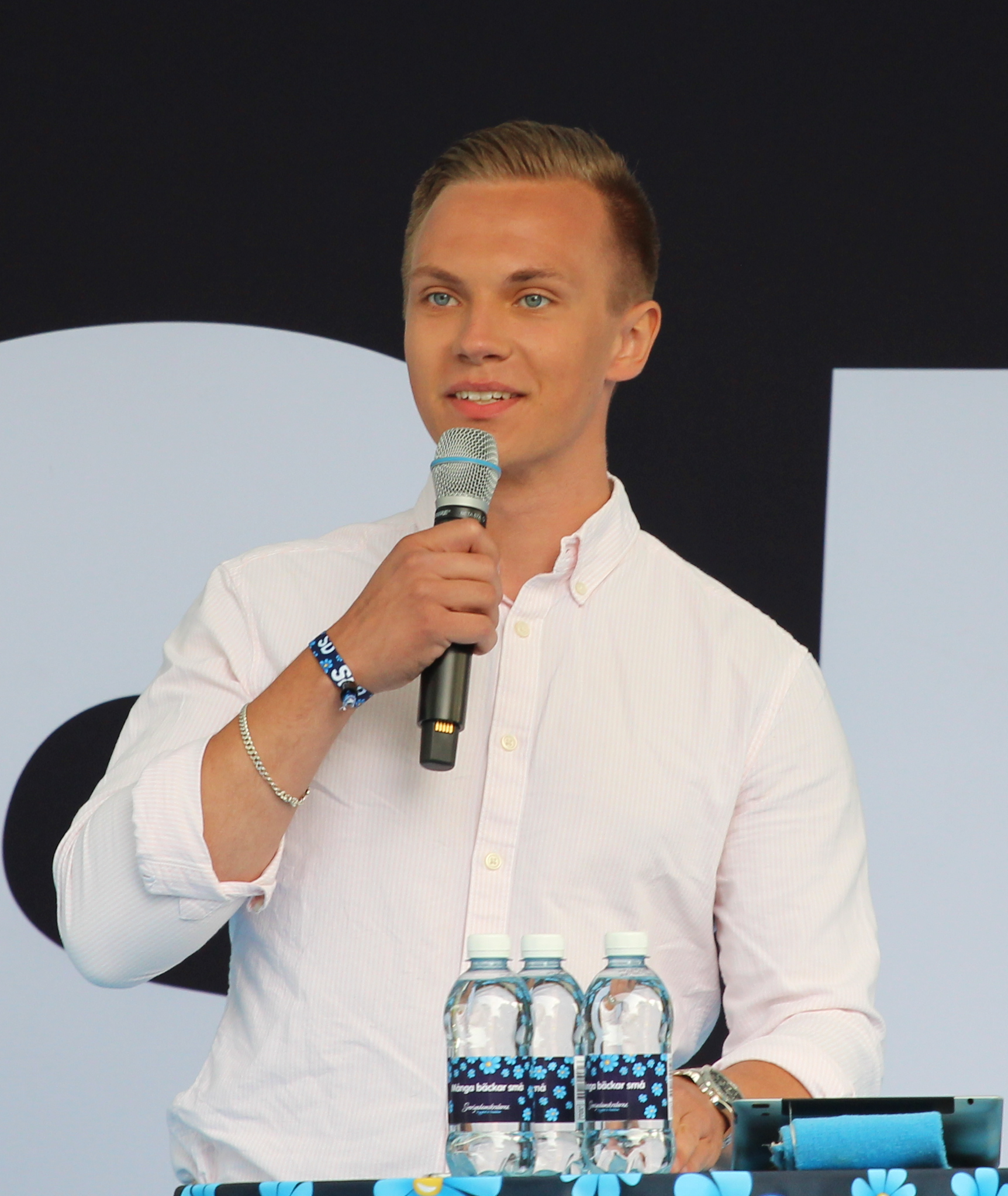
- Andersson in July 2017

Member of the Riksdag
- Incumbent
- Assumed office 24 September 2018
- Constituency: Västra Götaland County East

Chairman of the Young Swedes SDU
- In office 1 October 2015 – 15 October 2022
- Preceded by: Office established
- Succeeded by: Emil Eneblad

Personal details
- Born: Tobias Joachim Friden Andersson; 7 May 1996 (age 30) Skövde, Sweden
- Party: Sweden Democrats

Tobias Joachim Friden Andersson (born 7 May 1996) is a Swedish politician. He has been a Member of the Riksdag since September 2018 for the Sweden Democrats party, representing the constituency of Västra Götaland County East.

Andersson graduated with a bachelor's degree in economics at the Gothenburg School of Business, Economics and Law in 2018. In 2014, at the age of 18, Andersson was elected to the Skövde municipal council for the Sweden Democrats, and then became group leader for the party in the municipality. At the time he was a member of the Sweden Democratic Youth (SDU). In 2015, he ran for chairman of the SDU against Jessica Ohlson and was seen as a more moderate candidate but narrowly lost the election. After the Sweden Democrats announced it was to break ties with the SDU due to repeated controversies, Andersson became the national spokesperson of the new Young Swedes SDU on 1 October 2015, and was the first person to hold the position.

In autumn 2021, he was appointed the Sweden Democrats' legal policy spokesperson and committee chairman in the justice committee in the Riksdag. In 2022, he was appointed chairman of the Committee on Industry and Trade in the Riksdag.

In August 2022, Andersson received criticism from the leaderships of the Centre Party and Swedish Liberal Party leader Johan Pehrson after he Tweeted a picture of a Stockholm Metro train on which the SD had paid to feature a campaign advertisement with the caption "Repatriation train. You have a one-way ticket. Next stop Kabul!” SD leader Jimmie Åkesson denied that Andersson's comment was intended to be racist. Andersson later elaborated in an interview that his Twitter post had been a sarcastic response to people who claimed to be offended by the SD's subway advertising and were calling for it to be removed.

Honorary titles
Preceded by Axel Hallberg	Baby of the House; 2022	Succeeded by Aida Birinxhiku
