= Hannelore Baron =

American artist (1926–1987)

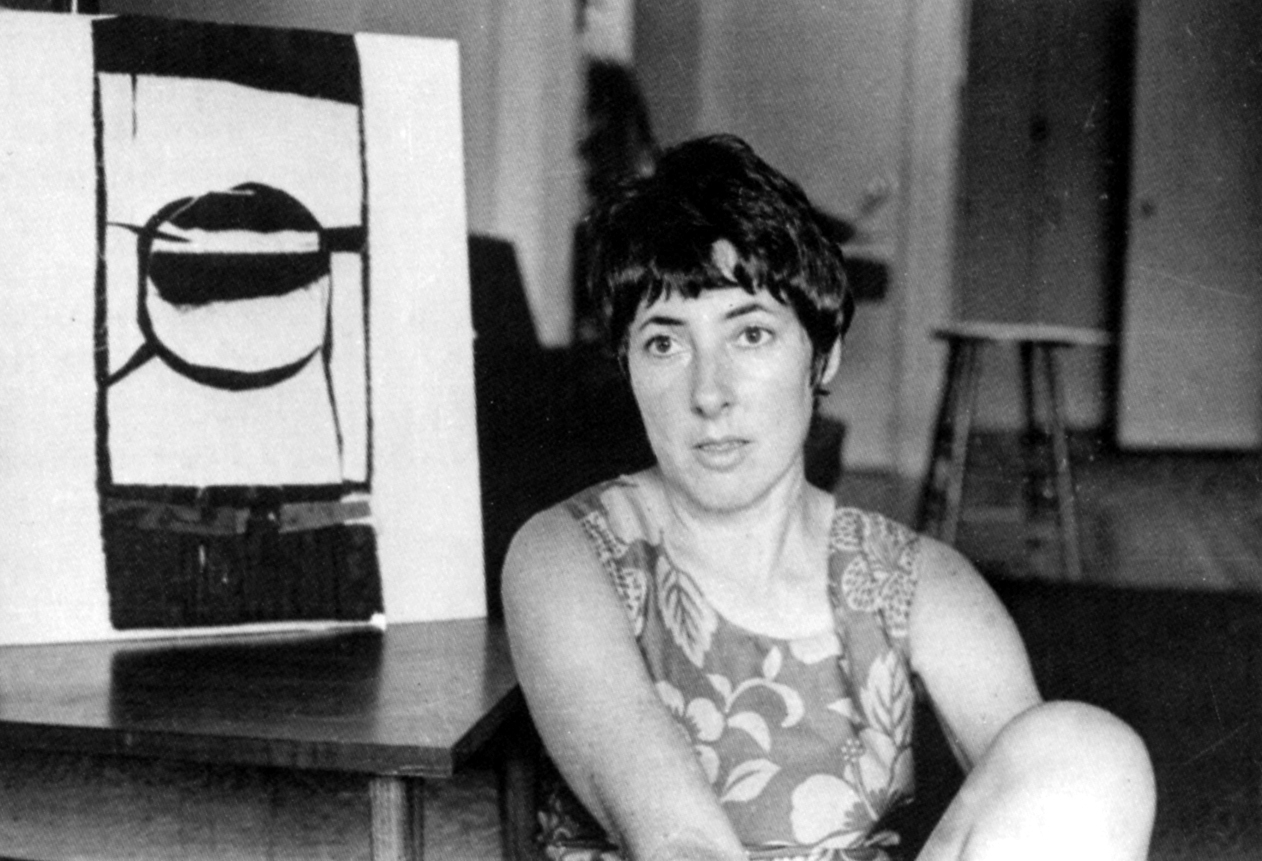
- Undated photo of Hannelore Baron in her studio
- Born: Hannelore Alexander; June 8, 1926; Dillingen, Germany
- Died: April 28, 1987 (aged 60); New York City, USA
- Known for: mixed-media art in collage and box constructions

Hannelore Baron (June 8, 1926 – April 28, 1987) was a German-American artist who created reminiscent and expressive collages and box constructions that blend abstraction, assemblage, and personal chronicle. Exhibited in the late 1960s, Baron's art often composed of found materials, fabric and text, earning recognition as an important artist in 20th-century mixed-media art.

== Biography ==
Hannelore Baron ( née Alexander) was born in Dillingen, Germany, on June 8, 1926. When she was twelve years old she experienced the horror of Kristallnacht (the Night of Broken Glass) on the night of November 9-10, 1938. Her family fled Nazi Germany, crossing the border into Luxembourg in 1939. In 1941 Baron's family travelled from Luxembourg City, to Metz, to Alsace, to Paris, to Hendaye, and finally to Lisbon, where they boarded the ship Mouzinho and sailed to New York. They settled in the Bronx, New York City. By the time Baron graduated from the Staubenmiller Textile High School in Manhattan in 1945, the young artist was reading eastern philosophy, making increasingly abstract paintings and already experiencing the symptoms of claustrophobia and depression that would lead to a series of nervous breakdowns throughout her life. Baron's high school education centered around fashion illustration, it was not of interest to her and no use in her art, although materials and textiles did interest her and were a paramount to her art. In 1950, Hannelore Alexander married Herman Baron, a bookseller, with whom she had their daughter Julie and their son Mark. In the late 1950s Baron combined a variety of techniques and began making her first collages. Occupied with raising her two children and beset by psychological problems, Baron nevertheless exhibited her work and in 1969, the year of her one-person exhibition at Ulster County Community College, she began to make the box constructions that would become her signature. In the early 1970s, Baron established a studio and devoted her time and energy completely to her artwork until her death in 1987 from cancer. Hannelore Baron was self-taught.

Although her compositions are completely abstract, she considered them to be both personal and political statements. In her own words,

Everything I’ve done is a statement on the, as they say, human condition...the way other people march to Washington, or set themselves on fire, or write protest letters, or go to assassinate someone. Well, I’ve had all the same feelings that these people had about various things, and my way out, because of my inability to do anything else for various reasons, has been to make the protest through my artwork... H.B.

Throughout the 1970s and 1980s her work garnered critical acclaim, along with gallery and museum exhibitions in the United States, Europe and Japan. In 1995, her work was the subject of a one-person exhibition at the Solomon R. Guggenheim Museum in New York. In 2001 her work was the subject of a traveling exhibition curated by Ingrid Schaffner and organized by the Smithsonian Institution Traveling Exhibition Service. Her works can be found in the collections of The Museum of Modern Art, New York; the Solomon R. Guggenheim Museum, New York; the Whitney Museum of American Art, New York; the Los Angeles County Museum of Art, The Art Institute of Chicago, the San Francisco Museum of Modern Art, the Museum of Fine Arts, Boston, the Minneapolis Institute of Art and the Israel Museum, Jerusalem.

== Selected public collections ==
- Albright-Knox Art Gallery, Buffalo, New York
- The Art Institute of Chicago, Chicago, Illinois
- Bass Museum, Miami, Florida
- The Brooklyn Museum, Brooklyn, New York
- The Chrysler Museum, Norfolk, Virginia
- Solomon R. Guggenheim Museum, New York City
- Hammer Museum, Los Angeles, California
- Hudson River Museum, Yonkers, New York
- Israel Museum, Jerusalem, Israel
- The Jewish Museum, New York City
- Kunstsammlung der Stadt Reutlingen, Reutlingen, Germany
- St. Lawrence University, Canton, New York
- Los Angeles County Museum of Art, Los Angeles, California
- Milwaukee Art Museum, Milwaukee, Wisconsin
- Minneapolis Institute of Art, Minneapolis, Minnesota
- Modern Galerie des Saarland Museums, Saarbrücken, Germany
- The Museum of Modern Art, New York City
- The Boston Museum of Fine Arts, Boston, Massachusetts
- The Smithsonian American Art Museum, Washington, DC
- The New York Public Library, New York City
- Racine Art Museum, Racine, Wisconsin
- San Francisco Museum of Modern Art, San Francisco, California
- Santa Barbara Museum of Art, Santa Barbara, California
- Skirball Museum and Cultural Center, Los Angeles, California
- Ulster County Community College, Stone Ridge, New York
