= Dominique Mulhem =

French painter

Dominique Mulhem (b. June 13, 1952 in Neuilly-sur-Seine) is a French painter.

== Early life ==
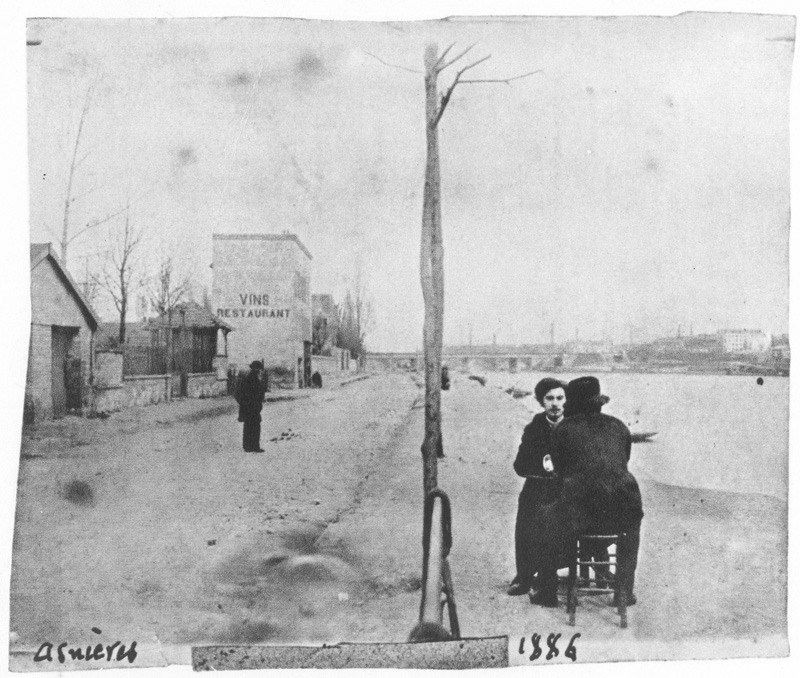
Émile Bernard and Vincent van Gogh on the banks of the Seine in Asnières (1886) Place where Dominique Mulhem passed her childhood

Mulhem was born in Neuilly-sur-Seine. Mulhem spent part of his childhood and adolescence in Asnières-sur-Seine where Georges Seurat painted a bather. His places of play were the edges of the Seine where the Masters of impressionism came to paint, Émile Bernard, Vincent van Gogh, Claude Monet, Paul Signac and Auguste Renoir.

== Career ==
He studied at the National school of the Arts of Paris. He teaches the techniques of painting to the airbrush.

His painting refers to pop culture art and Appropriation. His technique was at the beginning pop art with the use of the bomb and the stencil key sets. Later he became more hyperrealist with the use of the aerographer to forge a contemporary pointillism. He was the first multi-media artist, inventing in 1979 holopeinture where he mixed painting with holography. He had worked at the beginning of the 1970s on techniques of restoration of 3D. Beyond his representative forms, his painting is conceptual. The subjects are the life of people and things. Mulhem's work has the same main idea: the concept of the simultaneous vision. “The glance of the inside” as said Pierre Restany.

== Bibliography ==
- Dominique Mulhem et Bernard Peigneux, Technique de l'aérographe ou comment peindre avec l'air, Éditions Bornemann, Paris, 1981
- Anne-Marie Christakis, Mulhem, Galerie l'Orangeraie, Saint-Paul, 1982
- Maître Georges Blache, Mulhem 1984, Éditions SOS, Paris, 1984
- Claude Fayette, Mulhem Holopeintures, Éditions Cogepar, Saint Laurent du Var, 1988
- Pierre Restany, Mulhem, Éditions Galerie Eterso, Cannes, 1993
- Dominique Mulhem, Aero Graphic I, Éditions Aérographes Services, Paris, 1997
- Doria Camacho et Dominique Mulhem, Aero Graphic II, Éditions Aerographic, Paris, 2006
- Pierre Restany, Mulhem, Éditions YeaSung Gallery, Seoul, 2009
- Claude Fayette, Georges Blache, Pierre Restany, Valérie Salva de Villanueva, Yong-Sok O, Rétrospective Mulhem 1972/2009, Editions Ville d'Asnières, Asnières, 2009
