= Javier Peres =

Javier S. Peres
- Occupation: art dealer

Javier S. Peres (born 1972) is a contemporary art dealer and gallery owner. His former gallery, Peres Projects, was in the Karl-Marx-Allee in Berlin, and had offices in Los Angeles, California.

Following insolvency in early 2025, Peres Projects closed all its spaces in Berlin, Milan, and Seoul.

== Biography ==
Peres started Peres Projects in San Francisco, California, in 2002. He was included in the Art Review Power 100 in 2006. He collects premodern African Art.
