= Emil Eneblad =

Swedish politician (born 2001)

- Eneblad in 2026

Member of the Riksdag
- Incumbent
- Assumed office 28 September 2026
- Constituency: Uppsala County

Personal details
- Born: 18 May 2001 (age 25)
- Party: Sweden Democrats

Nils Emil Eneblad (born 18 May 2001) is a Swedish politician who was elected member of the Riksdag in 2026. From 2022 to 2024, he served as chairman of the Young Swedes SDU.
