= Istvan Horkay =

Hungarian painter (born 1945)

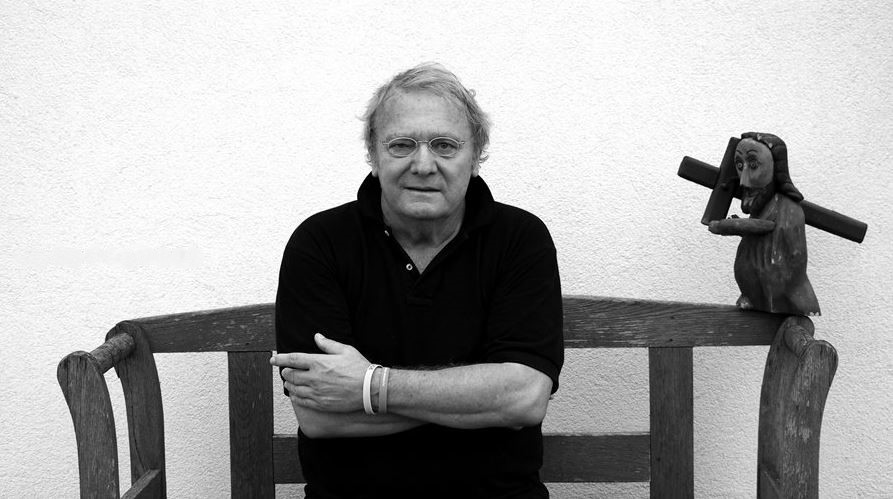
Photo of Istvan Horkay

István Horkay (born December 25, 1945, in Budapest) is a Hungarian painter, printmaker, digital artist, member of the HEAA

After graduating from the School of Fine Arts in Budapest in 1964, Horkay was invited to attend the Academy of Fine Arts in Cracow -Poland, one of the Major Art and Cultural Centers of Eastern Europe, where he received his Master of Fine Arts. He continued his Studies at the Royal Academy of Art in Copenhagen, Denmark. (1968) and did additional Post graduate work at the Academy of Fine Arts in Budapest. (1971) Horkay studied under the Internationally known Artist and Theater Director Tadeusz Kantor as well as Professors M. Wejman, J. Nowosielski, and Palle Nielsen, Danmark. He received Diplomas in Graphic Arts, Painting, and Film Animation.
He is member of the Alliance Graphique International (AGI), Hungarian Electrographic Art Association.

Horkay's art is epitomic in the double meaning of the word: a fragment, an incised part of something already in existence, and - just because of this incision - is an injury to the finished surface, to the tangle of writing or a finished picture. This relies on the experience that man, handing himself down through signs, simulates a kind of sense-wholeness. In these series this textual sense-wholeness appears to be ever different as different colors enter the surface at different sites. It is the same and not the same at the same time. "Once the signs are scars, then the wounds will tell tales of some non-alleviated history" (D. Kamper - Zur Soziologie der Imagination Hanser V. 1986. p. 148).

The sign will temporarily closen over the story. Who else would know this better than Freud, who, after the neurological-physiological and neuropsychical phases, so deeply doubted that it was possible "to bring to light the hidden content in its wholeness"

(Konstruktionen in der Analyse 1937. in: Stud. Ausgabe Ergb. Fischer V. 1982. p. 398).

Béla Bacsó

== Exhibitions ==
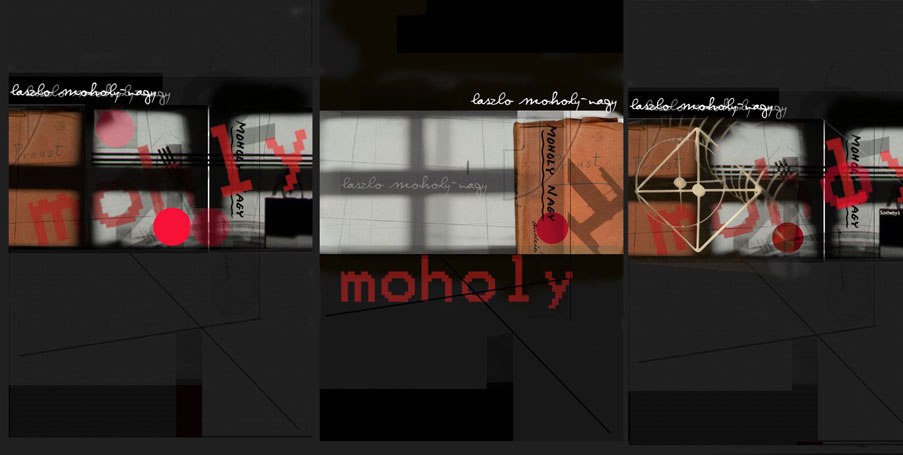
Horkay Istvan Moholy-Nagy digital collage 2006

- 2002 American Fine Art Editions Inc/Scottsdale
- 2002 Magyar Intézet, Moszkva
- 2002 Gallery of Art Eastern Washington University
- 2002 Kamiyamada /Japan/
- 2003 Leslie Sacks Fine Art Los Angeles/Web Exhibition/
- 2003 Collegium Hungaricum/Berlin/
- 2003 American Fine Art Editions Inc/Scottsdale
- 2003 LeVall Art Gallery Novosibirsk/ Russia
- 2004 Gutman Galery Budapest
- 2004 GGalery Budapest
- 2004 Peter Greenaway /Tulse Luper Film There
- 2004 Canariasmediafest
- 2004 Ausztralia IDAA
- 2004 Academy Gallery University of Tasmania
- 2004 QUT Art Museum Brisbane,
- 2004 VCA Gallery Australia
- 2004 Montreal Festival of New Cinema
- 2005 Belgrade/Closed Circuits/
- 2005 VCA Gallery University of Melbourne
- 2005 QUT Art Museum BRISBANE
- 2005 Beijing Today Art Museum
- 2006 Beijing Film Academy
- 2006 New Delhi India CEC+CAC
- 2006 QUT Art Museum Australia
- 2007 Metro5 Gallery Australia
- 2009 Jewish Museum of Australia
- 2009 Collegium Hungaricum Berlin
- 2009 Gallery art6 Richmond/ Virginia
- 2009 QACI Gallery, Queensland/ Australia
- 2010 Corona d'alloro alla carriera artistica Europclub Regione Siciliana (Italia) con Ennio Morricone, Giovamna Mulas
- 2011 Ballarat International Foto Biennale/Australia
- 2012 Vision in Motion/Melbourne Australia
- 2012 Vision in Motion II./ Roma/ Sapienza - Università di Roma/ Accademia d'Ungheria in Roma
- 2012 The One Thing / Manning Clark House/ Canberra /Australia
- 2012 The Little Mermaid / ANU Art Gallery /Canberra/Australia
- 2013 Accademia d'Ungheria in Roma
- 2013 Ballarat International Foto Biennale/Australia
- 2013 A Virtual Memorial Vilnius
- 2014 Brenda May Gallery Sydney Australia/Head On Photo Festival
- 2014 Roma/Ara Pacis Museum/ MashRome Film Fest
- 2014 Salone delle Bandiere del Comune di Messina
- 2014 Shanghai Teyou Culture Communication Co/China
- 2015 Li AN Cultural development Co Shanghai / China
- 2016 Léna Roselli Galéria Budapest
- 2016 MANK Galéria Szentendre
- 2016 Shenzhen OCT Loft- Manufacturing culture space / China
- 2017 Accademia di Belle Arti - Sassari /Sardegna
- 2018 Warsaw International Poster Biennale
- 2019 Accademia di Belle Arti/Cyberzone/Palermo/Sicily
- 2019 KAFF Kecskemét
- 2019 Pradita Institute/Singapore/Jakarta/Indonesia

2021 Warsaw International Poster Biennale
2022 Tóparti Galéria Révfülöp
2023 Bando Art Gallery, 2023 Warsaw International Poster Biennale
2023 Baekryong Art Center, Chuncheon, Dél-Korea
2023 Ausburg University of Applied Sciences Faculty of Design
