= Constantin Prozorov =

German digital collage artist

- Born: Constantin Prozorov; January 8, 1986 (age 40); Almaty, Kazakhstan
- Occupation: Artist
- Known for: collage art, digital art, collaborations with fashion brands
- Website: constantinprozorov.com

Constantin Prozorov is a German digital collage artist who combines fashion, surrealism, and digital art. He was raised in Munich, where he studied fashion and communication design. Prozorov has collaborated with luxury fashion brands such as Gucci, Moncler, Louis Vuitton, and BMW Group.

Prozorov grew up in a working-class family and developed an early interest in art, influenced by artists such as Andy Warhol and Jeff Koons. He studied fashion and communication design in Munich. He began his career working with Condé Nast in Paris, and later moved to Berlin to work independently.

Prozorov’s work is influenced by cinema, art history, and surrealism. He has cited artists such as Hieronymus Bosch and Salvador Dalí, and filmmakers like Wes Anderson and Tim Burton, as influences. His digital collages often combine elements such as mythical creatures, cityscapes, plants, and fashion to create surreal, dreamlike scenes.

Prozorov is working on his first book, a coming-of-age story set in California in 1984.
