= Reginald Case =

American painter (1937 - 2009)

- Born: December 23, 1937; Watertown, New York
- Died: April 24, 2009 (aged 71); Miami Beach, Florida
- Education: Boston University
- Known for: Painting, Collage, Sculpture

Reginald Case (December 23, 1937 – April 24, 2009) was an American artist who made American Folk Art collages and Hollywood iconographic mixed-media assemblages and sculptures.

== Life and work ==
Case was born in Watertown, New York, and graduated from Watertown High School in 1955. He studied at the State University of New York at Buffalo receiving a Bachelor of Science degree, San Francisco State University and Boston University, where he earned the Bachelor of Fine Arts and Master of Fine Arts degrees. He studied with Peter Busa at SUNY Buffalo and Robert Gwathmey and Walter Tandy Murch at Boston University. Upon completing his graduate studies in Boston, he taught at Phillips Exeter Academy and Norfolk State College (now Norfolk State University).

During this time, he completed a series of large still-life paintings which extended the imagery of Giorgio Morandi by elongating vessels and vases, transforming them into "architectonic towers". The direct quality of the collage textures led him to abandon these paintings altogether and turn to collage as his next form of expression. The Holocaust was a prevalent theme in Case's early pieces – in these modest but masterfully executed and consistent works, Case has been compared to something of a graphic Edgar Allan Poe or Pier Paulo Pasolini by Ronald A. Kuchta, Director of the Everson Museum of Art in Syracuse, NY.

Case's 1980's-90's work in assemblage, collage and construction fused early influences in film, photography, and architecture. Beginning with Rudolph Valentino from the 1920s through the 1930s with Fred Astaire, Ginger Rogers and Buck Rogers, and into the 1940s with Betty Grable and Humphrey Bogart, Case culminated this body of work with a series of objects that focused on Marilyn Monroe.

Case continued with contemporary works of Barbie and Madonna that reflected the glamour of an earlier era. In these there is an iconography of twentieth-century life that explores the imagery at the roots of American history and popular culture. In a recent series consisting of four groups of photo collage prints, Case has depicted Marilyn Monroe in variations called "MARILYN MONEY". This series substitutes her image for American currency and are notated with quotations by her reflecting on her life, e.g. "Hollywood is a place where they'll pay you a thousand dollars for a kiss and fifty cents for your soul."

Additional works by Case have made oblique references to 9/11 in his series of Gouache Heads, "365 Views of Delray Beach" and the series of New York City altered painted photographs. Each of these series cast a shadow on the event as seen from a distance of TV or Photographic News images.

His work was shown for many years at the Allan Stone Gallery, NYC, along with the paintings of Richard Estes and Wayne Thiebaud. He has also had major museum exhibitions of his work shown at the Everson Museum of Art, Syracuse, NY; Munson-Williams-Proctor Arts Institute, Utica, NY; Reading Museum, Reading, PA; and the Virginia Museum of Fine Arts, Richmond, VA. Case's work is also represented in many private and public collections, including the Museum of Fine Arts, Boston, MA; Smithsonian American Art Museum, Washington D.C.; The British Museum, London; The Fogg Art Museum, Harvard University, Cambridge, Massachusetts; The Jewish Museum, NYC; The Solomon R. Guggenheim Museum, NYC; The Victoria and Albert Museum, London; the Denver Art Museum, Denver; and many others. An exhibition showing many of the iconic Collages & Assemblages by Case will be at The Butler Institute of American Art from October 12 through December 31, 2008. Louis A. Zona, Director of the Butler Institute of American Art, writes in the exhibition catalog, " The work of Reg Case recalls the genius of Joseph Cornell and salutes as well the singular vision of Robert Rauschenberg. Like Warhol, he both pays tribute to such pop culture icons as Marilyn Monroe, Elvis, Barbie and Madonna, and simultaneously causes us to reflect upon the superficialality of much of what we hold precious."
