= J. Tobias Anderson =

Swedish artist and filmmaker

J Tobias Anderson (born 1971 in Gothenburg) is a Swedish artist and filmmaker, working with found footage and animation. He is best known for the short films 879 (1998), My Name Is Grant (1999), 879 Colour (2002) and Prairie Stop, Highway 41 (2004) - all referring to works by Alfred Hitchcock.

In his video works, most frequently in the form of animations, Anderson refers to film history and renowned film classics, as well as film genres - particularly Hitchcock, along with action and thriller sequences of escape and chase (from films North by Northwest, Rope, The Birds and Bullitt).

His work is held in the collection of the Moderna Museet in Stockholm and several works are distributed by Stiftelsen Filmform.

== Films ==
- Institution (2006)
- A Small Part of the World (2006)
- Chase (2005)
- Whereto I Go (2005)
- Al ladro! (2005)
- Bodega Bay School (2004)
- State of Fear (2004)
- Prairie Stop, Highway 41 (2004)
- Sliced Classics (2003)
- Nine Piece Rope (2003)
- Ögonblick/Moments (2003)
- 879 Colour (2002)
- Privacy and Dreams (2002)
- Everybody Wants to Be Grant (2002)
- Active Passive Passage Conversation (2000)
- My Name Is Grant (1999)
- The Breeding School (1999)
- 879 (1998)
- He Dies at the End (1997)

== Sources ==
- https://www.imdb.com
- http://www.pulafilmfestival.com
