= Baby of the House =

Youngest member of a parliamentary house

Baby of the House is the unofficial title given to the youngest member of a parliamentary house. The term is most often applied to members of the British parliament, from which the term originated. The title is named after the Father of the House, which is given to the longest-serving member of the British and other parliaments.

== Australia ==
In Australia the term is rarely used. Most MPs and senators are elected only in their thirties and later, but some prominent MPs have been elected early in life, including Prime Ministers Harold Holt, Malcolm Fraser and Paul Keating, the latter two of whom were both elected at age 25, in 1955 and 1969 respectively, and Holt at age 27. The youngest Baby of the House was Wyatt Roy; he was elected at age 20 in 2010, being the youngest person ever to be elected to an Australian parliament.

As of 2025, the current Baby of the House is the Member for Hughes David Moncrieff (age 29–30). Senator Charlotte Walker (politician) is the youngest member of the Senate (age 22).

== Azerbaijan ==
In the 2020 Azerbaijani parliamentary election, Sabina Khasayeva was the youngest MP elected, at the age of 27.

== Canada ==
The youngest-ever elected member of the House of Commons of Canada is Pierre-Luc Dusseault, who was elected at the age of 19 years and 11 months in 2011. Dusseault is the youngest MP in Canadian history. In the past this distinction has been held by MPs such as Sean O'Sullivan, Pierre Poilievre, Claude-André Lachance and Lorne Nystrom.

Currently, the youngest MP is Amandeep Sodhi, a member of the Liberal Party of Canada, representing the riding of Brampton Centre, Ontario; born in 2001, and elected at 24 years of age. The youngest member of the Senate of Canada is Patrick Brazeau of Repentigny, Quebec; born 1974, appointed at 34 years of age.

=== List of babies of the House of Commons of Canada ===
Elected	Name	Riding	Party	Age when elected
1968	Lorne Nystrom	Yorkton—Melville	New Democratic	22 years, 60 days
1972	Sean O'Sullivan	Hamilton—Wentworth	Progressive Conservative	20 years, 303 days
1974	Claude-André Lachance	Lafontaine	Liberal	20 years, 94 days
2004	Pierre Poilievre	Nepean—Carleton	Conservative	25 years, 25 days
2011	Pierre-Luc Dusseault	Sherbrooke	New Democratic	19 years, 336 days
2019	Eric Melillo	Kenora	Conservative	21 years, 206 days
2025	Amandeep Sodhi	Brampton Centre	Liberal	24 years
2025	Tatiana Auguste	Terrebonne	Liberal	24 years

== Finland ==
Entered	Name	Born	Party	Age when elected	Note
1970	Paavo Väyrynen	1946	Centre Party	24 years	
1972	Erkki Liikanen	1950	Social Democratic Party of Finland	21 years	
1979	Pekka Starast	1956	Social Democratic Party of Finland	23 years	died in 2011
1983	Sirpa Pietikäinen	1959	National Coalition Party	23 years	
1991	Minna Karhunen	1967	National Coalition Party		
1994	Kirsi Piha	1967	National Coalition Party		
1995	Säde Tahvanainen	1972	Social Democratic Party of Finland		
1999	Petri Neittaanmäki	1975	Centre Party		
2003	Satu Taiveaho	1976	Social Democratic Party of Finland		
2004	Oras Tynkkynen	1977	Green League		
2007	Tuomo Puumala	1982	Centre Party		
2011	Olli Immonen	1986	Finns Party		
2015	Ilmari Nurminen	1991	Social Democratic Party of Finland		
2019	Iiris Suomela	1994	Green League		
2023	Olga Oinas-Panuma	1999	Centre Party		

== France ==
=== List of youngest members of the French Parliament ===
This is a list of youngest members of the National Assembly under the Fifth Republic, at the time of their election.

Elected	Name	Constituency	Party	Age when elected
1958	Guy Vaschetti	Seine's 23rd	UNR	27 years, 65 days
1962	Moussa Ahmed Idriss	French Somaliland	PMP	29 years, 321 days
1967	Alain Terrenoire	Loire's 5th	UDR	25 years, 271 days
1968	Gérard Ducray	Var's 3rd	Independent	26 years, 161 days
1971	Pierre Bernard-Reymond	Hautes-Alpes's 1st	CDP	27 years, 323 days
1973	Aymeric Simon-Lorière	Var's 3rd	UDR	28 years, 254 days
1977	Dominique Dupilet	Pas-de-Calais's 6th	PS	32 years, 141 days
1978	Michel Barnier	Savoie's 2nd	RPR	27 years, 69 days
1981	François Fillon	Sarthe's 4th	RPR	27 years, 109 days
1986	Gautier Audinot	Isère	RPR	28 years, 178 days
1988	Thierry Mandon	Essonne's 9th	PS	30 years, 165 days
1993	François Baroin	Aube's 3rd	RPR	27 years, 280 days
1995	Jean-François Copé	Seine-et-Marne's 5th	RPR	31 years, 45 days
1995	Jean-Luc Warsmann	Ardennes's 3rd	RPR	30 years, 51 days
1997	Victor Brial	Wallis and Futuna	RPR	31 years, 53 days
1997	Cécile Helle	Vaucluse's 1st	PS	28 years, 58 days
2002	Édouard Courtial	Oise's 7th	UMP	28 years, 353 days
2004	Laurent Wauquiez	Haute-Loire's 1st	UMP	29 years, 84 days
2007	Olivier Dussopt	Ardèche's 2nd	PS	28 years, 305 days
2012	Marion Maréchal-Le Pen	Vaucluse's 3rd	FN	22 years, 190 days
2017	Ludovic Pajot	Pas-de-Calais's 10th	FN	23 years, 212 days
2022	Tematai Le Gayic	French Polynesia's 1st	Tāvini	21 years, 251 days
2024	Flavien Termet	Ardennes's 1st	RN	22 years, 154 days
2024	Hanane Mansouri	Isère's 8th	UDR	23 years, 317 days

== Germany ==
In Germany the term is rarely used. Emilia Fester was the youngest MP elected in the 2021 federal election at the age of 23.

Emily Vontz became the youngest MP in 2023, at the age of 22.

In 2022, Pascal Leddin became the youngest member of the Landtag of Lower Saxony. In 2022, Jasper Balke became the youngest member of the Landtag of Schleswig-Holstein.

== Grenada ==
Kerryne James was elected in the 2022 Grenadian general election at the age of 24, becoming the country's youngest ever legislator.

== Hong Kong ==
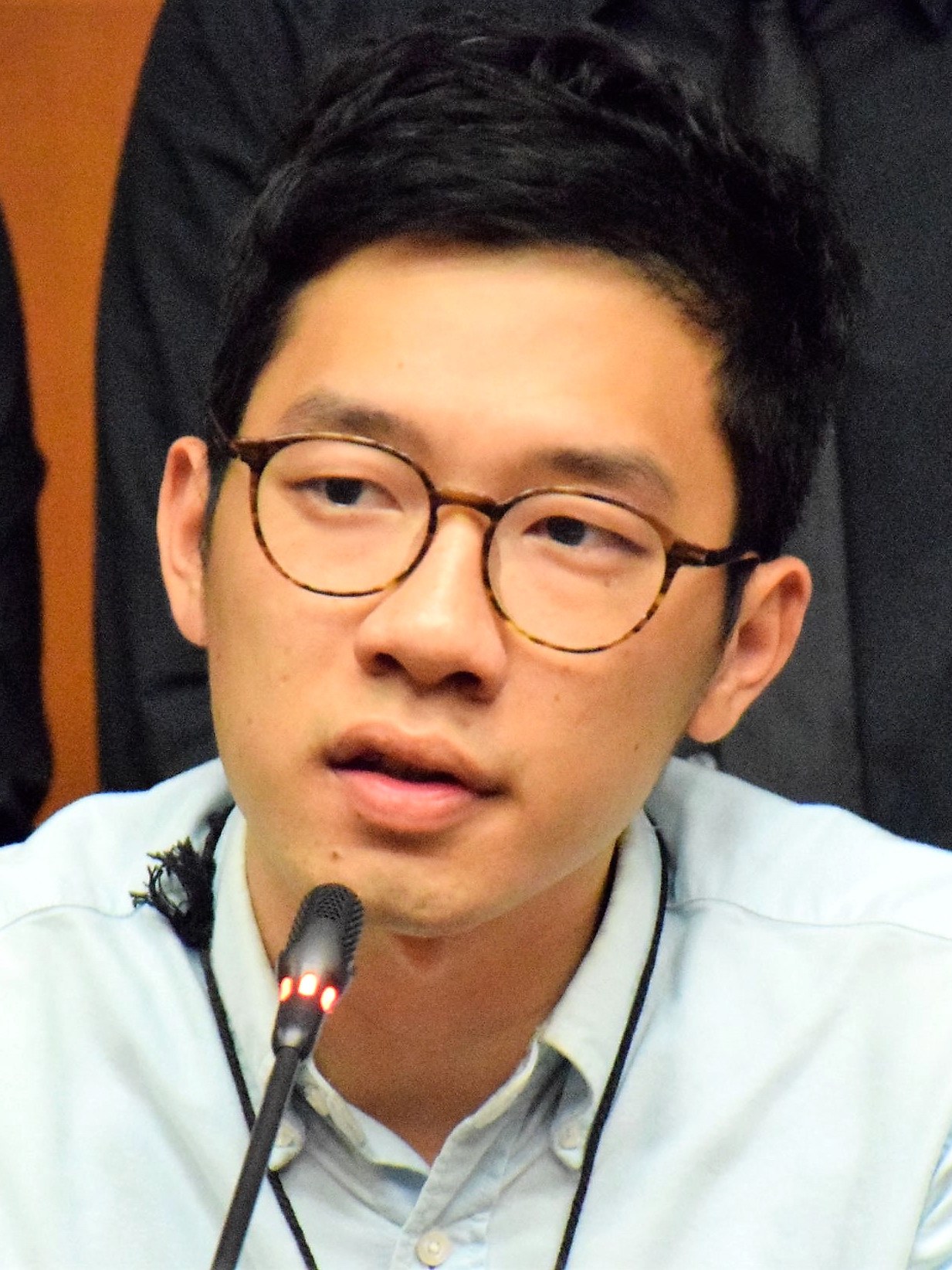
Nathan Law, the youngest member of the Legislative Council of Hong Kong, was elected at the age of 23.

In Hong Kong the term is rarely used. The current baby of the Legislative Council is Joephy Chan, who was elected in the 2021 Legislative Council election.

From 1991 to 2016 the youngest elected member was James To, who ran for the first Legislative Council direct election in 1991 at the age of 28. His record ceased in 2016, when the youngest-ever elected member Nathan Law and the youngest-ever elected female member Yau Wai-ching were both elected in the 2016 election at the ages of 23 and 25 respectively; they were both disqualified over the oath-taking controversy between 2016 and 2017. He was replaced by Ho Kai-ming, who was the fourth-youngest member when he was elected in 2016. He was later replaced by Au Nok-hin, who was elected in the 2018 by-election, but was unseated in 2019. The title went back to Ho, who subsequently resigned in May 2020 for joining the government and was replaced by Cheng Chung-tai, who was the fifth youngest member in 2016, until he himself got disqualified in August 2021. The title eventually returned to Steven Ho who was elected as the youngest member in 2012.

Duration	Name	Date of birth	Constituency	Party	Elected	Start age
1 October 1991 – 1 July 1998	James To	11 March 1963	Kowloon Southwest GC	United Democrats	1991	28 years, 6 months
1 July 1998 – 1 October 2008	Bernard Chan	11 January 1965	Insurance FC	Nonpartisan	1998	33 years, 5 months
1 October 2008 – 1 October 2012	Chan Hak-kan	24 April 1976	New Territories East GC	DAB	2008	32 years, 5 months
1 October 2012 – 29 February 2016	Steven Ho	30 November 1979	Agriculture and Fisheries FC	DAB	2012	32 years, 10 months
29 February 2016 – 1 October 2016	Alvin Yeung	5 June 1981	New Territories East GC	Civic	2016 (b)	34 years, 8 months
1 October 2016 – 14 July 2017	Nathan Law	13 July 1993	Hong Kong Island GC	Demosisto	2016	23 years, 2 months
14 July 2017 – 21 March 2018	Ho Kai-ming	6 January 1985	Labour FC	FTU	2016	32 years, 6 months
21 March 2018 – 17 December 2019	Au Nok-hin	18 June 1987	Hong Kong Island GC	Independent	2018 (b)	30 years, 9 months
17 December 2019 – 31 May 2020	Ho Kai-ming	6 January 1985	Labour FC	FTU	2016	34 years, 11 months
31 May 2020 – 26 August 2021	Cheng Chung-tai	5 November 1983	New Territories West GC	Civic Passion	2016	36 years, 6 months
26 August 2021 – 31 December 2021	Steven Ho	30 November 1979	Agriculture and Fisheries FC	DAB	2012	41 years, 8 months
1 January 2022 – 31 December 2025	Joephy Chan	1 December 1990	New Territories South West GC	FTU	2021	31 years, 1 month
1 January 2026 – Present	Vivian Kong	8 February 1994	Tourism FC	Independent	2026	31 years, 10 months

[(b) – by-election]

== Hungary ==
The youngest-ever elected member of the National Assembly is Ilona Burka, who became MP at the age of 19 years, 5 months and 13 days on 12 May 1971, following the 1971 parliamentary election.

Member	Party	Date
Károly Wirth	NYKP	1939–1944
András Kis	MKP	1944–1945
András Hegedüs	MKP	1945
István B. Rácz	FKGP	1945–1947
János Gosztonyi	NPP	1947–1949
Etel Kurlik	MDP	1949–1953
Mária Inklovics	MDP; MSZMP	1953–1957
Margit Kaptur	MSZMP	1957–1958
Jusztina Csarnai	MSZMP	1958–1963
István Ollári	MSZMP	1963–1967
István Bartha	MSZMP	1967–1971
Ilona Burka	MSZMP	1971–1975
Valéria Czégai	MSZMP	1975–1980
Ibolya Kovács	MSZMP	1980–1985
Márta Danka	MSZMP	1985–1989
Edit Bödő-Rózsa	Ind.	1989–1990
Edit Bödő-Rózsa	SZDSZ	1989–1990
Béla Glattfelder	Fidesz	1990–1993
Róbert Répássy	Fidesz	1993–1994
László Botka	MSZP	1994–1998
János Zuschlag	MSZP	1998–2002
Péter Szijjártó	Fidesz	2002–2006
László Nagy	MSZP	2006–2010
Dóra Dúró	Jobbik	2010–2018
Péter Ungár	LMP	2018–2022
Miklós Hajnal	Momentum	2022–2026
Ákos Berki	TISZA	2026–present

== India ==
Elected	Name	Constituency	Party	Age when elected
1984	Prakash Chandra Yadav	Barh	INC	25 years, 3 months
1989	Nakul Nayak	Phulbani	JD	26 years, 8 months
1991	Dipika Chikhlia	Vadodara	BJP	26 years, 2 months
1996	Nihal Chand Chauhan	Ganganagar	BJP	25 years, 4 months
1998	Yogi Adityanath	Gorakhpur	BJP	25 years, 8 months
2000 (b)	Akhilesh Yadav	Kannauj	SP	26 years, 7 months
2004 (b)	Dharmendra Yadav	Mainpuri	SP	25 years, 8 months
2009	Muhammed Hamdulla Sayeed	Lakshadweep	INC	27 years, 0 months
2014	Dushyant Chautala	Hisar	INLD	26 years, 1 month
2019	Chandrani Murmu	Keonjhar	BJD	25 years, 11 months
2024	Pushpendra Saroj	Kaushambi	SP	25 years, 3 months

[(b) – by-election]

== Iran ==
Elected	Member	Affiliation	Age when elected
2012	Mohammad Hassannejad	Independent	31
2016	Fatemeh Hosseini	List of Hope	30
2020	Rouhollah Nejabat	Independent	31

== Ireland ==
In Ireland the term used is Baby of the Dáil (Irish: Leanbh na Dála). The current baby of the Dáil is the Labour TD Eoghan Kenny (Cork North-Central), who was 24 years and 10 months old when elected in November 2024.

The youngest TD of all time was William J. Murphy, elected age 21 years 29 days; the youngest female TD was Kathleen O'Connor, 21 years 7 months.

=== List of babies of the Dáil ===
Elected	Name	Constituency	Party	Age
1918	Joseph Sweeney	West Donegal	Sinn Féin	21
1927	Timothy Quill	Cork North	Labour	26
1937	A. P. Byrne	Dublin North-West	Independent	24
1943	Oliver J. Flanagan	Laois–Offaly	Monetary Reform	23
1948	Neil Blaney	Donegal East	Fianna Fáil	26
1949	William J. Murphy	Cork West	Labour	21
1951	Declan Costello	Dublin North-West	Fine Gael	24
1956	Kathleen O'Connor	Kerry North	Clann na Poblachta	21
1957	Brigid Hogan	Galway South	Fine Gael	24
1958	Anthony Millar	Galway South	Fianna Fáil	23
1961	Lorcan Allen	Wexford	Fianna Fáil	21
1965	Des Foley	Dublin County	Fianna Fáil	24
1969	John Bruton	Meath	Fine Gael	22
1975	Máire Geoghegan-Quinn	Galway West	Fianna Fáil	24
1975	Enda Kenny	Mayo West	Fine Gael	24
1977	Síle de Valera	Dublin County Mid	Fianna Fáil	23
1979	Myra Barry	Cork North-East	Fine Gael	22
1981	Ivan Yates	Wexford	Fine Gael	21
1984	Brian Cowen	Laois–Offaly	Fianna Fáil	24
1987	Mary Coughlan	Donegal South-West	Fianna Fáil	21
1995	Mildred Fox	Wicklow	Independent	24
1997	Denis Naughten	Longford–Roscommon	Fine Gael	24
2002	Damien English	Meath	Fine Gael	24
2007	Lucinda Creighton	Dublin South-East	Fine Gael	27
2011	Simon Harris	Wicklow	Fine Gael	24
2016	Jack Chambers	Dublin West	Fianna Fáil	25
2020	James O'Connor	Cork East	Fianna Fáil	22
2024	Eoghan Kenny	Cork North-Central	Labour	24

=== Baby of Seanad Éireann ===
Elected	Name	Panel	Party	Age
2011	Kathryn Reilly	Industrial and Commercial Panel	Sinn Féin	22
2016	Fintan Warfield	Cultural and Educational Panel	Sinn Féin	24
2020	Fintan Warfield	Cultural and Educational Panel	Sinn Féin	28
2025	Nicole Ryan	Administrative Panel	Sinn Féin	31

== Israel ==
In Israel the term is seldom used. The youngest member of the current Knesset is Yitzhak Wasserlauf of Otzma Yehudit, elected in 2022 aged 30.

The youngest member of the Knesset ever is Moshe Nissim, elected in 1959 aged 24.

== Italy ==
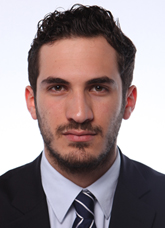
Enzo Lattuca, baby of the Italian Chamber of Deputies (2013–2018) and youngest deputy ever.

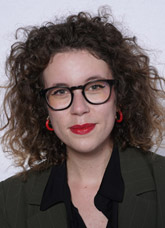
Rachele Scarpa, current baby of the Italian Chamber of Deputies.

The youngest member of the Chamber of Deputies ever is Enzo Lattuca (PD), elected in 2013, aged 25 years, 1 month, and 6 days.

Elected	Name	Party	Date of birth	Age
1948	Francesco Pignatone	DC	30 March 1923	25 years, 39 days
1953	Fabio De Felice	MSI	13 July 1927	25 years, 347 days
1958	Riccardo Misasi	DC	14 July 1932	25 years, 333 days
1963	Luigi Berlinguer	PCI	25 July 1932	30 years, 295 days
1967	Giuseppe Antonio Bottaro	PCI	21 October 1933	33 years, 138 days
1968	Carlo Sangalli	DC	31 August 1937	30 years, 279 days
1972	Giuseppa Mendola	PCI	4 December 1945	26 years, 173 days
1976	Paolo Allegra	PCI	2 December 1950	25 years, 216 days
1979	Anna Maria Castelli Migali	PCI	5 October 1951	27 years, 258 days
1979	Michl Ebner	SVP	20 September 1952	26 years, 363 days
1983	Giovanni Negri	PR	16 May 1957	26 years, 57 days
1987	Cristina Bevilacqua	PCI	9 March 1962	25 years, 115 days
1992	Elisabetta Bertotti	LN	8 December 1966	25 years, 137 days
1994	Sebastiano Fogliato	LN	28 September 1967	26 years, 199 days
1996	Franca Gambato	LN	31 August 1969	26 years, 252 days
2001	Chiara Moroni	NPSI	23 October 1974	26 years, 219 days
2006	Arturo Scotto	DS	15 May 1978	27 years, 348 days
2008	Annagrazia Calabria	PdL	6 May 1982	25 years, 359 days
2013	Enzo Lattuca	PD	9 February 1988	25 years, 34 days
2018	Angela Raffa	M5S	26 January 1993	25 years, 56 days
2022	Rachele Scarpa	PD	29 January 1997	25 years, 257 days

== Kenya ==
MP	Age	Party	Constituency	Election	Parliament
John Paul Mwirigi	23	UDA	Igembe South	2017	12th Parliament

== Luxembourg ==
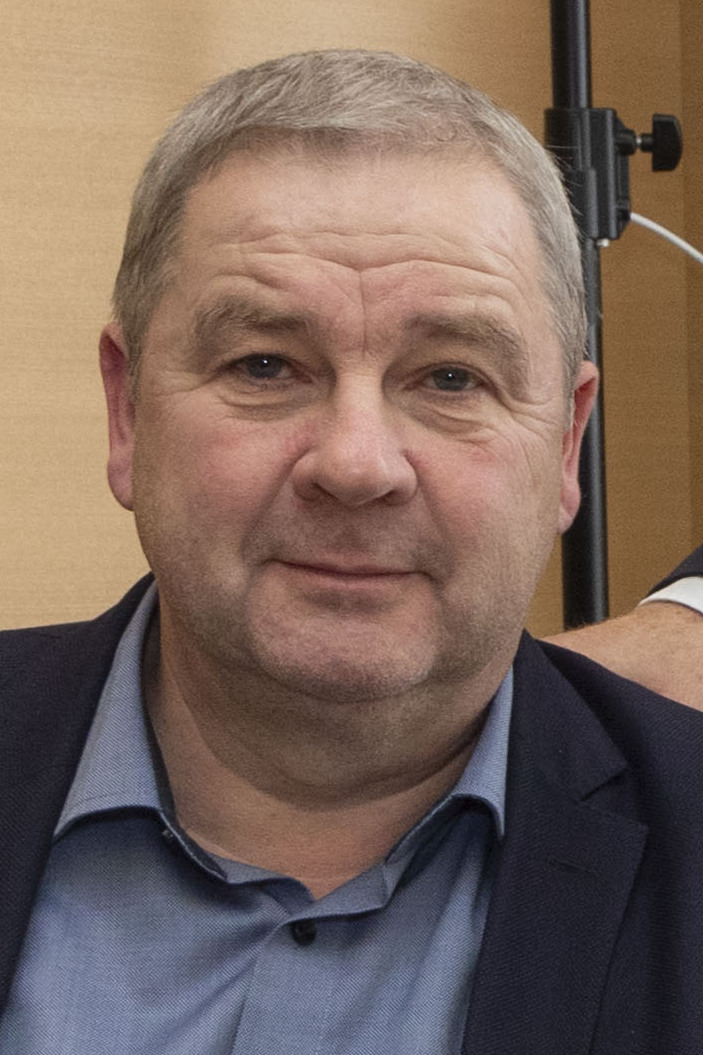
Michel Wolter (pictured in 2024) was the youngest ever member of the Chamber of Deputies, elected at age 21.

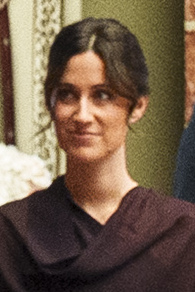
Liz Braz, the current youngest member of the Chamber

In Luxembourg's unicameral parliament, the Chamber of Deputies, no specific title exists to designate the youngest deputy. However, the two youngest elected deputies serve a symbolic role in the first public session following a general election; before a President of the Chamber is formally elected, the longest serving deputy (or until 2004, the oldest deputy) fulfills the role of president and is assisted by the two youngest deputies, who serve as secretaries.

List of successive youngest members of the Chamber of Deputies
Elected	Name	Party	Date of birth	Age
1863	Ernest Simons		17 January 1835	28 years, 284 days
1866	Paul Eyschen		9 September 1841	25 years, 50 days
1869	Antoine Pescatore		31 May 1842	26 years, 338 days
1875	Théodore-Arthur Bouvier		22 April 1849	26 years, 88 days
1881	Théodore Risch		5 December 1854	26 years, 303 days
1884	Robert Tudor		2 May 1857	27 years, 186 days
1887	Léon Auguste Collart		28 May 1858	29 years, 164 days
1890	Nicolas-Victor Hess		22 December 1864	25 years, 317 days
1896	Eugène Steichen		11 March 1866	30 years, 244 days
1899	Robert Brasseur	LL	19 November 1870	28 years, 353 days
1902	Léon Metzler	PSD	8 March 1877	25 years, 241 days
1905	Gustave de Ziegler		8 September 1879	26 years, 60 days
1908	Léon Metzler	PSD	8 March 1877	31 years, 247 days
1914	Joseph Bech	PD	17 February 1887	27 years, 133 days
1917	Bernard Herschbach	IPP	28 September 1891	25 years, 208 days
1918	Edouard Leon	SP	23 March 1892	26 years, 157 days
1918	Auguste Delaporte	PD	4 April 1892	26 years, 241 days
1925	Nicolas Biever	AP	22 May 1894	30 years, 308 days
1931	Denis Netgen	LSAP	20 January 1896	35 years, 294 days
1933	Fernand Loesch	PD	29 January 1900	33 years, 37 days
1934	Victor Bodson	PD	24 March 1902	32 years, 227 days
1935	Jean Fohrmann	LSAP	5 January 1904	31 years, 45 days
1937	Tony Biever	PD	8 April 1908	29 years, 215 days
1945	Aloyse Duhr	CSV	18 April 1918	27 years, 202 days
1948	Romain Fandel	CSV	25 June 1922	26 years, 25 days
1959	Jean Spautz	CSV	9 September 1930	28 years, 177 days
1968	Colette Flesch	DP	16 April 1937	31 years, 295 days
1974	Jean Regenwetter	LSAP	2 February 1943	31 years, 145 days
1975	Zénon Bernard	KPL	17 October 1944	31 years, 54 days
1979	Charles Goerens	DP	6 February 1952	27 years, 150 days
1979	Lydie Polfer	DP	22 November 1952	26 years, 244 days
1984	Michel Wolter	CSV	13 September 1962	21 years, 307 days
1994	Luc Frieden	CSV	16 September 1963	29 years, 305 days
1994	Agnès Durdu	DP	26 March 1964	30 years, 215 days
1999	Renée Wagener	DG	21 November 1962	36 years, 234 days
1999	Xavier Bettel	DP	3 March 1973	26 years, 162 days
2004	Claudia Dall'Agnol	LSAP	6 April 1973	31 years, 119 days
2009	Fabienne Gaul	CSV	22 September 1978	30 years, 141 days
2009	Claudia Dall'Agnol	LSAP	6 April 1973	36 years, 93 days
2009	Ben Scheuer	LSAP	7 May 1980	29 years, 82 days
2011	Tessy Scholtes	CSV	1 June 1981	29 years, 336 days
2011	Serge Wilmes	CSV	6 May 1982	29 years, 158 days
2013	Lex Delles	DP	28 November 1984	28 years, 350 days
2013	Tess Burton	LSAP	10 June 1985	28 years, 178 days
2018	Sven Clement	PPL	19 January 1989	29 years, 284 days
2018	Djuna Bernard	DG	15 June 1992	26 years, 174 days
2022	Jessie Thill	DG	10 February 1996	25 years, 343 days
2023	Liz Braz	LSAP	29 September 1996	27 years, 25 days

== Malawi ==
The youngest MP in Malawi was Angela Zachepa, who was voted in as MP at age 21.

== Malaysia ==
In Malaysia, the term is very rarely used. Most MPs are directly elected and Senators are appointed or indirectly elected, usually in their middle age, but a few were elected as an MP at a very young age, including former Prime Minister and former Pekan MP Najib Razak, who was elected at 22 years and 6 months in 1976. The youngest ever elected is Batu MP Prabakaran Parameswaran, who was elected at the age of 22 years and 3 months in 2018. The present Baby of the House is Sungai Petani MP Mohammed Taufiq Johari, who was elected in 2022. Mohammed Taufiq is a month younger than Prabakaran. Any citizen 18 years of age or older can become a candidate and be directly elected to the Dewan Rakyat as an MP and State Legislative Assemblies as an MLA, while any citizen 30 years of age or older can be appointed or indirectly elected to the Dewan Negara as a Senator.

== Marshall Islands ==
In the 2019 general election, Kitlang Kabua became the youngest person ever elected to the Nitijeļā.

== Namibia ==
In the 2024 Namibian general election, Fenny Tutjavi was the youngest MP elected.

== New Zealand ==
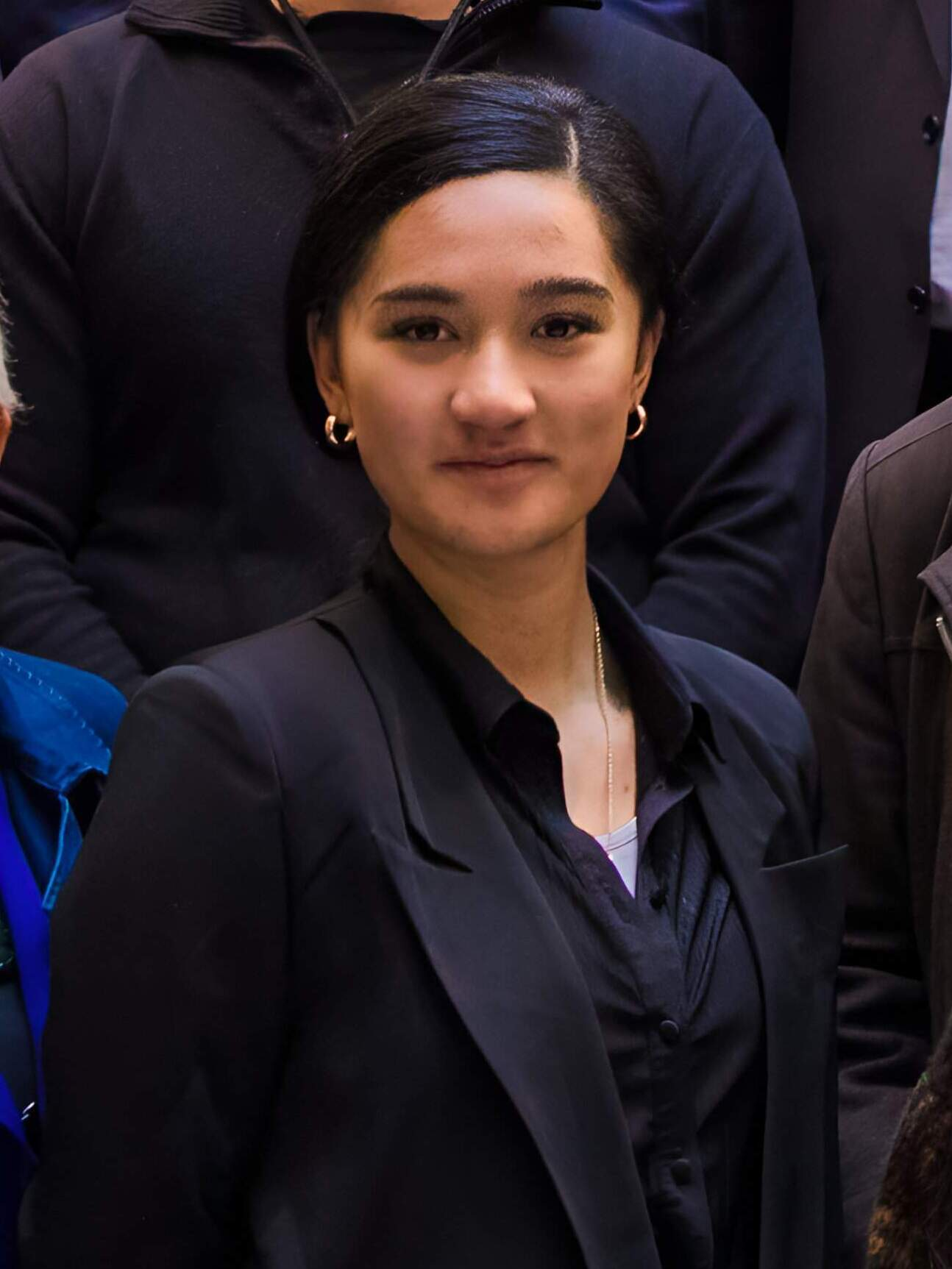
Maipi-Clarke in 2024

The term "Baby of the House" is rarely used in New Zealand. The current Baby of the House is Hana-Rawhiti Maipi-Clarke of Te Pāti Māori, who was elected on 14 October 2023 aged 21. Maipi-Clarke succeeded Chlöe Swarbrick of the Green Party, who was elected on 24 September 2017 aged 23.

Youngest MPs in the New Zealand House of Representatives
Name	Elected from	Party	Date of birth	Elected	Age
James Stuart-Wortley	Christchurch Country	Independent	16 January 1833	1 October 1853	20 years, 258 days
Augustus White	Akaroa	Independent	1839	13 February 1861	22
Robert Campbell	Oamaru	Independent	8 January 1843	6 April 1866	23 years, 88 days
Ralph Richardson	Suburbs of Nelson	Independent	1848	23 January 1871	22
William Pearson	Ashley	Independent	1854	9 December 1881	27
Arthur Rhodes	Gladstone	Independent	20 March 1859	26 September 1887	28 years, 190 days
Jackson Palmer	Waitemata	Independent Liberal	1867	5 December 1890	23
Patrick O'Regan	Inangahua	Liberal	6 February 1869	20 December 1893	24 years, 317 days
Thomas Wilford	Wellington Suburbs	Liberal	20 June 1870	4 December 1896	26 years, 167 days
Harry Bedford	City of Dunedin	Liberal	31 August 1877	25 November 1902	25 years, 86 days
Francis Fisher	Wellington Central	Liberal	22 December 1877	6 December 1905	27 years, 349 days
Tom Seddon	Westland	Liberal	2 July 1884	13 July 1906	22 years, 11 days
John A. Lee	Auckland East	Labour	31 October 1891	7 December 1922	31 years, 37 days
George Black	Motueka	United	21 November 1903	14 November 1928	24 years, 359 days
Keith Holyoake	Motueka	Reform	11 February 1904	1 December 1932	28 years, 294 days
Terry McCombs	Lyttelton	Labour	5 September 1905	24 July 1935	29 years, 322 days
Ormond Wilson	Rangitikei	Labour	18 November 1907	27 November 1935	28 years, 9 days
Joseph Cotterill	Wanganui	Labour	26 September 1905	15 October 1938	33 years, 19 days
Tapihana Paraire Paikea	Northern Maori	Labour	26 January 1920	24 September 1943	23 years, 241 days
Warren Freer	Mt Albert	Labour	27 December 1920	24 September 1947	26 years, 271 days
Jim Edwards	Napier	Labour	24 February 1927	13 November 1954	27 years, 262 days
Basil Arthur	Timaru	Labour	18 September 1928	21 July 1962	33 years, 306 days
Brian MacDonell	Dunedin Central	Labour	19 May 1935	30 November 1963	28 years, 195 days
Jonathan Hunt	New Lynn	Labour	2 December 1938	26 November 1966	27 years, 359 days
Murray Rose	Otago Central	National	14 December 1939	29 November 1969	29 years, 350 days
Mike Moore	Eden	Labour	28 January 1949	25 November 1972	23 years, 302 days
Marilyn Waring	Raglan	National	7 October 1952	29 November 1975	23 years, 53 days
Simon Upton	Waikato	National	7 February 1958	28 November 1981	23 years, 294 days
Nick Smith	Tasman	National	24 December 1964	27 October 1990	25 years, 307 days
Nanaia Mahuta	List	Labour	21 August 1970	12 October 1996	26 years, 52 days
Darren Hughes	Ōtaki	Labour	3 April 1978	27 July 2002	24 years, 115 days
Jacinda Ardern	List	Labour	26 July 1980	8 November 2008	28 years, 105 days
Gareth Hughes	List	Green	31 October 1981	11 February 2010	28 years, 103 days
Jami-Lee Ross	Botany	National	10 December 1985	5 March 2011	25 years, 85 days
Todd Barclay	Clutha-Southland	National	8 June 1990	20 September 2014	24 years, 104 days
Chlöe Swarbrick	List	Green	26 June 1994	23 September 2017	23 years, 89 days
Hana-Rawhiti Maipi-Clarke	Hauraki-Waikato	Te Pāti Māori	2002	14 October 2023	21 years, 18 days

== Philippines ==
In the Congress of the Philippines, the term "Baby of the House" is rarely used; the term "Benjamin" of the chamber is used instead. Special treatment is not given to the youngest member of either chamber. However, by tradition, the youngest member of the chamber usually administers the oath of office to their incoming leader (i.e. President of the Senate and Speaker of the House of Representatives).

The minimum age for being a member of the House of Representatives is 25 years old, while for the Senate it is 35, as stipulated in the 1987 Constitution of the Philippines. In 1933, Benigno Aquino, Sr. became senator at the age of 33; the Jones Law, which created the Senate, had prescribed the minimum age of 30.

The current Benjamin of the House is Representative Andrew Julian Romualdez of Tingog Sinirangan. Meanwhile, Senator Camille Villar has been the youngest Senator since 2025, taking over her older brother, Mark Villar.

In the opening of the 8th Congress of the Philippines under the newly promulgated 1987 constitution, the Benjamin of the House, Gerardo Roxas Jr., was the presiding officer until a speaker was elected, instead of the secretary-general, which has not been appointed by the House by then.

=== List of youngest members of the Philippine House of Representatives ===
Entered	Name	Party	District	Date of birth	Assumed office	Age	Note	Ref
1987	Gerardo Roxas Jr.	Liberal	Capiz–1st	21 October 1960	30 June 1987	26 years, 252 days	Presiding officer of the opening of the first session	
1992	Ralph Recto	LDP	Batangas–4th	11 January 1964	30 June 1992	28 years, 171 days		
1995	Mike Defensor	Liberal	Quezon City–3rd	30 June 1969	30 June 1995	26 years, 0 days		
1998	Alan Peter Cayetano	Lakas	Pateros–Taguig	28 October 1970	30 June 1998	27 years, 245 days		
2001	Felix William Fuentebella	NPC	Camarines Sur–3rd	5 February 1975	30 June 2001	26 years, 145 days		
2002	Joel Villanueva	CIBAC	Partylist	2 August 1975	6 February 2002	26 years, 188 days		
2004	Joel Villanueva	CIBAC	Partylist	2 August 1975	20 June 2004	28 years, 333 days		
2007	Sharee Ann Tan	Lakas	Samar–2nd	11 May 1982	30 June 2007	25 years, 50 days		
2010	Abigail Faye Ferriol-Pascual	Kalinga	Partylist	21 September 1984	30 June 2010	25 years, 282 days	sworn in Feliciano Belmonte as Speaker	
2013	Xavier Jesus Romualdo	Liberal	Camiguin	5 December 1986	30 June 2013	26 years, 207 days	sworn in Feliciano Belmonte as Speaker	
2016	Dennis Laogan	Ang Kabuhayan	Partylist	1 September 1990	30 June 2016	25 years, 303 days	sworn in Pantaleon Alvarez and Gloria Macapagal-Arroyo as Speaker	
2019	Braeden John Biron	Nacionalista	Iloilo–4th	10 January 1994	30 June 2019	25 years, 171 days	sworn in Alan Peter Cayetano as Speaker	
2022	Jaime Cojuangco	NPC	Tarlac–1st	12 April 1997	30 June 2022	25 years, 79 days	sworn in Martin Romualdez as Speaker	
2025	Andrew Julian Romualdez	Tingog	Partylist	21 February 2000	30 June 2025	25 years, 129 days		

=== List of youngest members of the Philippine Senate ===
Congress	Name	Party	Date of birth	Age When Elected	From	To
8th	Joey Lina	UNIDO	22 December 1951	35 years, 190 days	30 June 1987	30 June 1992
9th, 10th	Nikki Coseteng	NPC	18 December 1952	39 years, 195 days	30 June 1992	30 June 1998
11th	Loren Legarda	Lakas	28 January 1960	38 years, 153 days	30 June 1998	30 June 2001
12th	Ralph Recto	Nacionalista	11 January 1964	37 years, 170 days	30 June 2001	30 June 2004
13th	Bong Revilla	Lakas	25 September 1966	37 years, 279 days	30 June 2004	30 June 2007
14th, 15th	Antonio Trillanes	Nacionalista	6 August 1971	35 years, 327 days	30 June 2007	30 June 2013
16th	Bam Aquino	Liberal	9 May 1977	36 years, 52 days	30 June 2013	30 June 2016
17th, 18th	Manny Pacquiao	UNA	17 December 1978	37 years, 196 days	30 June 2016	30 June 2022
19th	Mark Villar	Nacionalista	14 August 1978	43 years, 320 days	30 June 2022	30 June 2025
20th	Camille Villar	Nacionalista	25 January 1985	40 years, 156 days	30 June 2025	present

== Papua New Guinea ==
After winning a 2025 by-election to replace his father, Maso Karipe, Gidron Maso Karipe of Porgera-Paiela open is believed to be the youngest member of the National Parliament of Papua New Guinea.

== Russia ==
Elected	Name	Party	Age when elected
1993	Mark Feygin	Choice of Russia	22
1995	Darya Mitina	CPRF	22
1999	Vladislav Dyomin	LDPR	25
2003	Pavel Semjonov	United Russia	27
2007	Robert Schlegel	United Russia	23
2016	Vasily Vlasov	LDPR	21
2021	Georgy Arapov	New People	22

== Singapore ==
The current youngest MP in the Singapore Parliament is Eileen Chong, who was appointed a Non-Constituency Member of Parliament in 2025 at the age of 33. The youngest MP ever elected in Singapore was Lim Chin Siong, who was elected in the 1955 general election at the age of 22.

Elected	Name	Party	Age
1955	Lim Chin Siong	PAP	22
1976	Tan Soo Khoon	PAP	27
2011	Tin Pei Ling	PAP	27
2020	Raeesah Khan	WP	26
2020	Nadia Ahmad Samdin	PAP	30
2025	Eileen Chong	WP	33

== South Africa ==
The current titleholder, since 2017, is Hlomela Bucwa of the Democratic Alliance.

== Spain ==
Ada Santana Aguilera (born 1998) is the youngest member of the 15th Congress of Deputies.

== Sweden ==
Entered	Name	Constituency	Party	Age	Note
2002	Gustav Fridolin	Stockholm Municipality	Green	19	Spokesperson of the Green Party, 2011–2019; Minister for Education, 2014–2019
2006	Annie Lööf	Jönköping County	Centre	23	Leader of the Centre Party, 2011–2023; Minister for Enterprise, 2011–2014
2010	Anton Abele	Stockholm Municipality	Moderate	18	
2014	Dennis Dioukarev	Jönköping County	Sweden Democrats	21	
2015	Jesper Skalberg Karlsson	Gotland County	Moderate	21	Replaced Gustaf Hoffstedt on 19 January 2015 when Hoffstedt resigned his seat.
2018	Ebba Hermansson	Skåne County	Sweden Democrats	22	
21 September 2021	Axel Hallberg	Skåne County	Green	22	Replaced Emma Berginger on 20 September 2021 during her leave of absence
19 May 2022	Tobias Andersson	Västra Götaland County East	Sweden Democrats	26	When Emma Berginger returned from her leave of absence on 19 May 2022, Axel Hallberg automatically left the Parliament. Since Ebba Hermansson, the previous Baby of the House, had resigned her seat in December 2021, the new Baby of the House became Tobias Andersson at the age of 26.
2022	Aida Birinxhiku	Halland County	Social Democrats	23	Aida Birinxhiku become the youngest member of the Parliament following the 2022 general election.
18 January 2023	Daniel Lönn	Dalarna County	Sweden Democrats	21	Replaced Sara Gille from 18 January 2023 during her leave of absence. This happened since Rasmus Giertz, who had up to then replaced Sara Gille, became an ordinary member of the Parliament following Mats Nordberg's death.
31 March 2023	Aida Birinxhiku	Halland County	Social Democrats	23	Aida Birinxhiku regained her position as the youngest member of the Parliament after Sara Gille returned from her leave of absence, thus ending Daniel Lönns time in Parliament.
28 August 2023	Jonathan Svensson	Västra Götaland County North	Social Democrats	23	Jonathan Svensson became the youngest member of the Parliament when Paula Holmqvist went on leave of absence in August 2023 and finally succeeded her on 4 March 2024, when she resigned her seat.
2026	Hanna Lindqvist	Skåne County South	Green	22	Hanna Lindqvist become the youngest member of the Parliament following the 2026 general election.

The current Baby of the House is Hanna Lindqvist. The youngest person ever to be elected MP to a Swedish parliament is Anton Abele, who was only aged 18 when elected in September 2010. Current record holder for the world's youngest-ever elected MP is Anton Abele, who at 18 years was elected to the Swedish Parliament for his activism against street violence.

== Turkiye ==
Rümeysa Kadak (born 16 May 1996) is the youngest MP in the history of Republic of Turkey.

== Trinidad and Tobago ==
Saddam Hosein is the baby of the house of the 12th Republican Parliament.

== Uganda ==
At 19 years old, Proscovia Alengot Oromait was the world's youngest MP and youngest ever MP in Africa when elected in 2011. Oromait is a member of the National Resistance Movement (NRM) in Uganda and was a representative of Usuk County until 2016. She was succeeded as the youngest member of parliament in Uganda by Hellen Auma Wandera.

== United Kingdom ==
Becoming the Baby of the House of Commons is regarded as something of an achievement, despite the lack of any special treatment that comes with the title. However, some MPs who have held the position for a considerable period – Matthew Taylor was the Baby of the House for over ten years – have found it somewhat embarrassing, as it may suggest that they have a lack of experience, although many holders of the title have gone on to enjoy long and distinguished parliamentary careers.

From August 1999 to September 2001, all three of the leaders of the main political parties – Tony Blair, William Hague and Charles Kennedy – had been the youngest MPs in their party when they began their political careers, though only Kennedy had been Baby of the House.

Of those whose ages can be verified, the youngest MP since the Reform Act 1832 is Mhairi Black, elected in 2015 aged 20 years 237 days. The age of candidacy for Parliament was lowered from 21 to 18 by the Electoral Administration Act 2006. William Pitt the Younger was elected at 21 and became Prime Minister two years later in 1783. There were younger MPs in earlier centuries: Christopher Monck was elected as MP for Devon in 1667 aged 13; when his father died three years later and Monck became Duke of Albemarle, he could not then take his seat in the House of Lords until aged 21.

Owen Carron directly replaced Bobby Sands as both MP for Fermanagh South Tyrone and Baby of the House following Sands' death on hunger strike, but neither ever took his seat. George Charles Grey is the only other Baby of the House to die while in post, in World War Two. The current Baby of the House is Sam Carling.

=== List of babies of the House of Commons ===
In the following table, "(b)" denotes an MP elected at a by-election.

Elected	Name	Constituency	Party	Age when elected
1880 (b)	James Dickson	Dungannon	Liberal	21
1885	Harry Levy-Lawson	St Pancras West	Liberal	22
1888 (b)	Lord Walter Gordon-Lennox	Chichester	Conservative	22
1890 (b)	Henry Harrison	Mid Tipperary	Irish Parliamentary	22
1891 (b)	Victor Cavendish	West Derbyshire	Conservative	23
1891 (b)	Frederick Smith	Strand	Conservative	23
1892	Thomas Bartholomew Curran	Kilkenny City	Irish National Federation	22
1895	Viscount Milton	Wakefield	Liberal Unionist	22
1898 (b)	Sir Samuel Scott, Bt	Marylebone West	Conservative	24
1898 (b)	Arthur Hill	West Down	Conservative	24
1900	Richard Rigg	Appleby	Liberal	23
1904 (b)	Viscount Turnour	Horsham	Conservative	21
1906	Lord Wodehouse	Mid Norfolk	Liberal	22
Jan 1910	Charles Thomas Mills	Uxbridge	Conservative	22
Dec 1910	Viscount Wolmer	Newton	Liberal	23
1912 (b)	Sir Philip Sassoon, Bt	Hythe	Conservative	23
1915 (b)	John Esmonde	North Tipperary	Irish Parliamentary	21
1916 (b)	Patrick Whitty	North Louth	Irish Parliamentary	21
1917 (b)	Lord Stanley	Liverpool Abercromby	Conservative	22
1918	Joseph Sweeney	West Donegal	Sinn Féin	21
1919 (b)	Esmond Harmsworth	Isle of Thanet	Coalition Conservative	21
1922	Arthur Evans	Leicester East	National Liberal	24
1923	Charles Rhys	Romford	Conservative	24
1924	Hugh Lucas-Tooth	Isle of Ely	Conservative	21
1929 (b)	Jennie Lee	North Lanarkshire	Labour	24
1929	Frank Owen	Hereford	Liberal	23
1931	Roland Robinson	Widnes	Conservative	24
1933 (b)	Lord Willoughby de Eresby	Rutland and Stamford	Conservative	25
1935 (b)	Charles Taylor	Eastbourne	Conservative	24
1935	Malcolm Macmillan	Western Isles	Labour	22
1940 (b)	John Profumo	Kettering	Conservative	25
1941 (b)	George Charles Grey	Berwick-upon-Tweed	Liberal	22
1944	John Profumo	Kettering	Conservative	29
1945 (b)	Ernest Millington	Chelmsford	Common Wealth	29
1945	Edward Carson	Isle of Thanet	Conservative	25
1948 (b)	Roy Jenkins	Southwark Central	Labour	27
1950	Peter Baker	South Norfolk	Conservative	28
1950 (b)	Tony Benn	Bristol South East	Labour	25
1950 (b)	Thomas Teevan	Belfast West	UUP	23
1951	Tony Benn	Bristol South East	Labour	26
1954 (b)	John Eden	Bournemouth West	Conservative	28
1954 (b)	John Woollam	Liverpool West Derby	Conservative	27
1955	Philip Clarke	Fermanagh and South Tyrone	Sinn Féin	21
1955	Peter Kirk	Gravesend	Conservative	27
1956 (b)	Marcus Kimball	Gainsborough	Conservative	27
1957 (b)	Robert Cooke	Bristol West	Conservative	26
1958 (b)	Basil de Ferranti	Morecambe and Lonsdale	Conservative	28
1958 (b)	Patrick Wolrige-Gordon	East Aberdeenshire	Conservative	23
1959 (b)	Paul Channon	Southend West	Conservative	23
1964	Teddy Taylor	Glasgow Cathcart	Conservative	27
1965 (b)	David Steel	Roxburgh, Selkirk and Peebles	Liberal	26
1966	John Ryan	Uxbridge	Labour	25
1967 (b)	Les Huckfield	Nuneaton	Labour	24
1969 (b)	Bernadette Devlin	Mid Ulster	Unity	21
Feb 1974	Dafydd Elis Thomas	Merioneth	Plaid Cymru	27
Oct 1974	Hélène Hayman	Welwyn and Hatfield	Labour	25
1977 (b)	Andrew MacKay	Birmingham Stechford	Conservative	27
1979 (b)	David Alton	Liverpool Edge Hill	Liberal	28
1979	Stephen Dorrell	Loughborough	Conservative	27
1981 (b)	Bobby Sands	Fermanagh and South Tyrone	Anti H-Block	27
1981	Stephen Dorrell	Loughborough	Conservative	29
1981 (b)	Owen Carron	Fermanagh and South Tyrone	Anti H-Block	28
1983	Charles Kennedy	Ross, Cromarty and Skye	SDP	23
1987 (b)	Matthew Taylor	Truro	Liberal	24
1997	Chris Leslie	Shipley	Labour	24
2000 (b)	David Lammy	Tottenham	Labour	27
2003 (b)	Sarah Teather	Brent East	Liberal Democrats	29
2005	Jo Swinson	East Dunbartonshire	Liberal Democrats	25
2009 (b)	Chloe Smith	Norwich North	Conservative	27
2010	Pamela Nash	Airdrie and Shotts	Labour	25
2015	Mhairi Black	Paisley and Renfrewshire South	SNP	20
2019	Nadia Whittome	Nottingham East	Labour	23
2023 (b)	Keir Mather	Selby and Ainsty	Labour	25
2024	Sam Carling	North West Cambridgeshire	Labour	22

=== Youngest member of the House of Lords ===
The title 'Baby of the House' is not used in the House of Lords, though the youngest member is recorded on the House website. As of March 2024, the youngest member of the House is Baroness Smith of Llanfaes (born 15 May 1996), who was created a life peer at the age of 27, becoming the youngest-ever life peer.

The youngest male member of the House is Lord Kempsell (born 8 May 1992), who was likewise created a life peer in July 2023 at the age of 31.

Standing Orders state that "No Lord under the age of one and twenty years shall be permitted to sit in the House". When most members of the Lords were hereditary peers, a peer who had inherited his or her peerage(s) while under age was entitled to take a seat on the day before his or her 21st birthday.

=== List of youngest members of the Scottish Parliament ===
This is a list of youngest members of the Scottish Parliament created in 1999.

Elected	Name	Constituency/region	Party	Age when elected
1999	Duncan Hamilton	Highlands and Islands region	SNP	25
2003	Richard Baker	North East Scotland region	Labour	28
2007	Aileen Campbell	South of Scotland region	SNP	25
2011	Humza Yousaf	Glasgow region	SNP	26
2016	Ross Greer	West Scotland region	Green	21
2021	Emma Roddick	Highlands and Islands region	SNP	23
2026	Iris Duane	Glasgow	Green	23

=== List of youngest members of the Senedd ===
This is a list of youngest members of the Senedd (Welsh Parliament), created in 1999. From its creation in 1999 until May 2020, the Senedd was known as the National Assembly for Wales (Welsh: Cynulliad Cenedlaethol Cymru).

Elected	Name	Constituency/region	Party	DOB	Age when elected
1999	Jonathan Morgan	South Wales Central	Conservative	27 November 1974	24
2003	Laura Ann Jones	South Wales East	Conservative	21 February 1979	24
2007	Bethan Jenkins	South Wales West	Plaid Cymru	9 December 1981	25
2016	Steffan Lewis	South Wales East	Plaid Cymru	30 May 1984	31
2018 (b)	Jack Sargeant	Alyn and Deeside	Labour	1994	23
2021	Luke Fletcher	South Wales West	Plaid Cymru	1995/96	25
2026	Niamh Salkeld	Blaenau Gwent Caerffili Rhymni	Plaid Cymru	1998/99	27

== United States ==
While the term is used in the Commonwealth Parliaments, Baby of the House or Senate is not in general contemporary use in the United States, nor does being the youngest member confer special treatment in either house of Congress.

Members of the US Congress tend to be older than parliamentarians elsewhere in the English-speaking world, a main factor being that the minimum ages for members of Congress is written into Article One of the United States Constitution, which forbids those under the age of 25 from serving in the House, and those under the age of 30 from serving in the Senate. Moreover, election to the federal Congress is expensive and requires extensive contacts and recognition across a very wide area. Individuals aiming to serve in the federal legislature generally seek election to the state legislature (state legislatures generally have lower minimum ages for entry) or other state office before seeking to serve in Washington.

In the upcoming 120th Congress, which will begin on 3 January 2027, the youngest member of the United States House of Representatives will be Michael Alfonso, who was born on February 18, 2000 (age 26).

Currently, the youngest US senator is Jon Ossoff, born on 16 February 1987 (age 39), and first elected to a full term in the Senate in the 2020–21 United States Senate election in Georgia.

== Zimbabwe ==
Zimbabwe is a commonwealth country where the term "baby of the house" isn't used, but young MPs are represented in the Parliament of Zimbabwe.

MP	Party	Constituency	Age	Election	Parliament	Source
Joanah Mamombe	Movement for Democratic Change Alliance	Harare West	25	2018	9th Parliament of Zimbabwe	
Takudzwa Ngadziore	Citizens Coalition for Change	Youth quota	24	2023	10th Parliament of Zimbabwe	

== See also ==
- Dean of the House
- Dean of the Senate
- Father of the House
