= 1908 Luxembourg general election =

Partial general elections were held in Luxembourg on 26 May and 2 June 1908, electing 29 of the 50 members of the Chamber of Deputies.

== Results ==
Candidates in bold were elected.

Canton	Seats	Candidate	1st round	2nd round
Canton	Seats	Candidate	Votes	Votes
Echternach	3	**Joseph Brincour**	607	
Echternach	3	**Jean-Mathias Föhr**	564	
Echternach	3	**Mathias Huss**	525	
Echternach	3	Henri Even	521	
Echternach	3	Hub. Campill	376	
Echternach	3	**Turnout**	1,029	
Esch-sur-Alzette	11	**Albert Clemang**	2,207	
Esch-sur-Alzette	11	**Michel Welter**	1,892	
Esch-sur-Alzette	11	**Léon Metz**	1,715	2,231
Esch-sur-Alzette	11	**Charles Krombach**	1,622	2,163
Esch-sur-Alzette	11	**Edmond Muller**	1,556	2,036
Esch-sur-Alzette	11	**Xavier Brasseur**	1,700	2,034
Esch-sur-Alzette	11	**Émile Mark**	1,648	2,007
Esch-sur-Alzette	11	**Aloyse Kayser**	1,540	1,970
Esch-sur-Alzette	11	**Léon Metzler**	1,585	1,923
Esch-sur-Alzette	11	**Caspar Mathias Spoo**	1,465	1,922
Esch-sur-Alzette	11	**Jean-Pierre Nau**	1,358	1,853
Esch-sur-Alzette	11	de Ziegler	1,604	1,584
Esch-sur-Alzette	11	Eugène Steichen	1,497	1,466
Esch-sur-Alzette	11	Eugéne Dondelinger	1,378	1,352
Esch-sur-Alzette	11	Hub. Loutsch	1,310	1,275
Esch-sur-Alzette	11	J.-N. Conzemius	1,239	1,247
Esch-sur-Alzette	11	Ch. de Tornaco	1,268	1,210
Esch-sur-Alzette	11	Alfr. Meyers	1,142	1,131
Esch-sur-Alzette	11	Jean-Jacques Diderich	1,308	134
Esch-sur-Alzette	11	J.-N. Schneidesch	1,168	104
Esch-sur-Alzette	11	Alb Ensch	1,107	
Esch-sur-Alzette	11	Ph. Hoffmann	682	
Esch-sur-Alzette	11	Henri Krein	66	
Esch-sur-Alzette	11	**Turnout**	3,651	
Luxembourg-Campagne	7	**Maurice Pescatore**	1,878	
Luxembourg-Campagne	7	**Auguste Laval**	1,730	
Luxembourg-Campagne	7	**Norbert Le Gallais**	1,699	
Luxembourg-Campagne	7	**Emile Bastian**	1,512	1,737
Luxembourg-Campagne	7	**Adolphe Schmit**	1,158	1,542
Luxembourg-Campagne	7	**Paul Mayrisch**	1,077	1,491
Luxembourg-Campagne	7	**Antoine Kayser**	1,362	1,480
Luxembourg-Campagne	7	P.-El. Schoué	961	1,434
Luxembourg-Campagne	7	Émile Reuter	1,179	1,410
Luxembourg-Campagne	7	Aug. Thorn	1,013	1,178
Luxembourg-Campagne	7	A. Erpelding	1,160	1,173
Luxembourg-Campagne	7	Ad. Loesch	847	
Luxembourg-Campagne	7	Ed. Feyden	705	
Luxembourg-Campagne	7	A. Daubenfeld	613	
Luxembourg-Campagne	7	A. Greten	498	
Luxembourg-Campagne	7	J. Gehlen	165	
Luxembourg-Campagne	7	Léon Medinger	11	
Luxembourg-Campagne	7	**Turnout**	3,116	
Mersch	3	**Alphonse Eichhorn**	624	
Mersch	3	**Gustave Wilhelmy**	610	
Mersch	3	**Nicolas Ludovicy**	542	632
Mersch	3	L. Wehenkel	402	474
Mersch	3	Aug. Servais	345	
Mersch	3	Pr. Linden	318	
Mersch	3	Mich. Weiss	286	
Mersch	3	J. Rodenbour	37	
Mersch	3	P. Henckels	8	
Mersch	3	**Turnout**	1,126	1,112
Remich	2	**Jean-Pierre Knepper**	737	
Remich	2	**Joseph-Charles Faber**	501	741
Remich	2	Théodore Flammang	566	562
Remich	2	L. Lacroix	379	
Remich	2	**Turnout**	1,340	1,309
Wiltz	3	**Charles Mathieu**	743	
Wiltz	3	**Michel Thilges**	663	
Wiltz	3	**Michel Weynandy**	686	
Wiltz	3	M.-A. Klein	222	
Wiltz	3	B. Dieschbourg	144	
Wiltz	3	N.-P. Kunnen	129	
Wiltz	3	**Turnout**	995	
