= 1896 Luxembourg general election =

Partial general elections were held in Luxembourg on 9 and 16 June 1896, electing 24 members of the Chamber of Deputies. The elections took place in Echternach, Esch-sur-Alzette, Luxembourg-Campagne, Mersch, Remich, and Wiltz.

== Results ==
Canton	Seats	Candidate	First round	Second round
Canton	Seats	Candidate	Votes	Votes
Luxembourg-Campagne	6	Auguste Laval	821	
Luxembourg-Campagne	6	Adolphe Schmit	756	766
Luxembourg-Campagne	6	Charles Crocius	749	667
Luxembourg-Campagne	6	Math. Zahlen	718	559
Luxembourg-Campagne	6	Em. Bastian	685	730
Luxembourg-Campagne	6	Charles Collart	654	
Luxembourg-Campagne	6	Julien Fischer	616	619
Luxembourg-Campagne	6	Théodore de la Fontaine	582	693
Luxembourg-Campagne	6	Antoine Erpelding	565	580
Luxembourg-Campagne	6	Schoué	489	
Luxembourg-Campagne	6	Auguste Weber	407	464
Luxembourg-Campagne	6	J.-B. Weicker	378	
Luxembourg-Campagne	6	Turnout	1,567	
Echternach	3	Jean-Mathias Föhr	490	
Echternach	3	Jean-Joseph Brincour	430	
Echternach	3	J. P. Jörg	418	
Echternach	3	Joh. Knaff	240	
Echternach	3	Kries	219	
Echternach	3	Dondelinger	54	
Echternach	3	Turnout	664	
Remich	2	Velter	518	
Remich	2	L. Lacroix	439	410
Remich	2	Jean-Pierre Knepper	310	476
Remich	2	Macher	210	
Remich	2	Turnout	901	895
Mersch	3	Eichhorn	438	
Mersch	3	Wilhelmy	437	
Mersch	3	Leibfried	408	
Mersch	3	Servais	310	
Mersch	3	Jean Souvignier	271	
Mersch	3	Turnout	750	
Esch-sur-Alzette	7	De Tornaco	1,179	
Esch-sur-Alzette	7	Léon Metz	1,079	
Esch-sur-Alzette	7	De Gerlache	966	
Esch-sur-Alzette	7	Caspar Mathias Spoo	887	908
Esch-sur-Alzette	7	Steichen	885	776
Esch-sur-Alzette	7	Théodore de Wacquant	747	750
Esch-sur-Alzette	7	Auguste Collart	819	604
Esch-sur-Alzette	7	Welter	575	577
Esch-sur-Alzette	7	Mathias Diederich	781	567
Esch-sur-Alzette	7	Victor Hoffmann	533	455
Esch-sur-Alzette	7	Pierre Kirsch	618	407
Esch-sur-Alzette	7	Wagener	332	
Esch-sur-Alzette	7	Heymes	331	
Esch-sur-Alzette	7	Turnout	1,901	
Wiltz	3	Mathieu	561	
Wiltz	3	Reding	478	
Wiltz	3	Weinandy	473	
Wiltz	3	Heynen	337	
Wiltz	3	Turnout	753	
Sources: L'indépendance luxembourgeoise; Obermosel-Zeitung, Luxemburger Wort
