= 1914 Luxembourg general election =

Partial general elections were held in Luxembourg on 9 and 16 June 1914, electing 31 of the 52 members of the Chamber of Deputies.

== Results ==
Canton	Seats	Candidate	First round	Second round
Canton	Seats	Candidate	Votes	Votes
Echternach	3	Mathias Huss	949	
Echternach	3	François Kries	888	
Echternach	3	Lamoral de Villers	823	
Echternach	3	Joseph Brincour	724	
Echternach	3	Gustave Gretsch	689	
Echternach	3	Théodore Walch	573	
Esch-sur-Alzette	13	Albert Clemang	3,201	
Esch-sur-Alzette	13	Charles Hoffmann	3,124	
Esch-sur-Alzette	13	Léon Metz	2,875	3,925
Esch-sur-Alzette	13	Charles Krombach	2,639	3,779
Esch-sur-Alzette	13	Auguste Flesch	3,025	3,767
Esch-sur-Alzette	13	Edmond Müller	2,631	3,755
Esch-sur-Alzette	13	Léon Metzler	3,045	3,727
Esch-sur-Alzette	13	Jean Schortgen	2,382	3,686
Esch-sur-Alzette	13	Aloyse Kayser	3,076	3,675
Esch-sur-Alzette	13	J.-P. Michels	2,546	3,663
Esch-sur-Alzette	13	Emile Mark	3,044	3,659
Esch-sur-Alzette	13	Joseph Thorn	2,632	3,565
Esch-sur-Alzette	13	Michel Welter	2,632	3,499
Esch-sur-Alzette	13	Eugéne Dondelinger	3,042	2,813
Esch-sur-Alzette	13	Eugène Steichen	2,596	2,482
Esch-sur-Alzette	13	Michel Klepper	2,508	2,450
Esch-sur-Alzette	13	Hasemer-Schmit	2,452	2,404
Esch-sur-Alzette	13	Joseph Klensch	2,437	2,385
Esch-sur-Alzette	13	Joseph Heymes	2,385	2,327
Esch-sur-Alzette	13	J.-P. Pierrard	2,434	2,324
Esch-sur-Alzette	13	Adolphe Goedert	2,345	2,309
Esch-sur-Alzette	13	Albert Meintz	2,362	2,299
Esch-sur-Alzette	13	Jean Reimen	2,275	2,217
Esch-sur-Alzette	13	Jean Weber	2,296	2,105
Esch-sur-Alzette	13	Mathias Adam	2,269	
Esch-sur-Alzette	13	Jacques Laux	2,165	
Esch-sur-Alzette	13	Jean-Jacques Diderich	1,228	
Esch-sur-Alzette	13	Schaack-Wirth	811	
Esch-sur-Alzette	13	Eugène Pesch	598	
Esch-sur-Alzette	13	Georges Droessart	243	
Luxembourg-Campagne	8	Maurice Pescatore	3,118	
Luxembourg-Campagne	8	Auguste Laval	2,883	
Luxembourg-Campagne	8	Norbert Le Gallais	2,867	
Luxembourg-Campagne	8	Joseph Palgen	2,637	
Luxembourg-Campagne	8	Emile Bastian	2,612	
Luxembourg-Campagne	8	Émile Reuter	2,512	
Luxembourg-Campagne	8	Adolphe Schmit	2,423	2,775
Luxembourg-Campagne	8	Paul Mayrisch	2,462	2,765
Luxembourg-Campagne	8	Antoine Kayser	2,233	2,286
Luxembourg-Campagne	8	Paul Koch	2,408	
Luxembourg-Campagne	8	Nic. Mackel	2,152	
Luxembourg-Campagne	8	Albert Philippe	2,100	
Luxembourg-Campagne	8	Alf. Diederich	1,977	
Luxembourg-Campagne	8	J.-P. Kohner	1,928	
Luxembourg-Campagne	8	Jean Rauchs-Wagner	1,872	
Luxembourg-Campagne	8	Victor Berens	1,751	
Luxembourg-Campagne	8	Léon Medinger		
Mersch	2	Alphonse Eichhorn	877	
Mersch	2	Nicolas Ludovicy	814	917
Mersch	2	Jean-Pierre Ecker	812	781
Mersch	2	Gustave Wilhelmy	331	
Remich	2	Joseph Faber	940	
Remich	2	Théodore Flammang	890	
Remich	2	Eugène Knepper	608	
Remich	2	Joseph Schumann	112	
Wiltz	3	Michel Weinandy	1,209	
Wiltz	3	Michel Meyers	1,188	
Wiltz	3	Alphonse Neyens	1,030	
Wiltz	3	Charles Mathieu	814	
Wiltz	3	Alphonse Greisch	610	
Source: L'indépendance luxembourgeoise
