= 1890 Luxembourg general election =

Partial general elections were held in Luxembourg on 10 June 1893, electing members of the Chamber of Deputies. The elections took place in Echternach, Esch-sur-Alzette, Luxembourg-Campagne, Mersch, Remich, and Wiltz.

Under the election law at the time, any second-round run-off votes took place on the same day as the first round.

The elections saw the failure of the anti-clerical side's Brasseur and Laval to secure seats, while in the clerical bloc, Knaff and Wolter were defeated; many of the clerical side's new candidates also failed to secure election.

== Results ==
Candidates in bold were elected successfully.

Canton	Seats	Candidate	First round	Second round
Canton	Seats	Candidate	Votes	Votes
Echternach	3	**Jean-Mathias Föhr**	228	
Echternach	3	**Jean-Joseph Brincour**	213	
Echternach	3	**Robert Tudor**	177	
Echternach	3	Theisen	130	
Echternach	3	Dondelinger	115	
Echternach	3	**Turnout**	311	
Esch-sur-Alzette	6	**Auguste Collart**	617	
Esch-sur-Alzette	6	**Mathias Diederich**	596	
Esch-sur-Alzette	6	**Léon Metz**	571	
Esch-sur-Alzette	6	**Pierre Kirsch**	546	
Esch-sur-Alzette	6	**Théodore-Willibrord de Wacquant**	496	
Esch-sur-Alzette	6	**Jean-Nicolas Klensch**	478	
Esch-sur-Alzette	6	Dominique Brasseur	473	
Esch-sur-Alzette	6	**Turnout**	878	
Luxembourg-Campagne	5	**Adolphe Fischer**	460	
Luxembourg-Campagne	5	**Charles Collart**	440	
Luxembourg-Campagne	5	**Adolphe Schmit**	425	
Luxembourg-Campagne	5	**Charles Crocius**	377	
Luxembourg-Campagne	5	**J. B. Weicker**	373	
Luxembourg-Campagne	5	Auguste Laval	356	
Luxembourg-Campagne	5	J. B. Jaminet	280	
Luxembourg-Campagne	5	**Turnout**	643	
Mersch	3	**Mersch**	244	
Mersch	3	**Jean Souvignier**	206	
Mersch	3	**Leibfried**	177	
Mersch	3	Jean Knaff	110	
Mersch	3	**Turnout**	311	
Remich	3	**Jean-Pierre Knepper**	224	
Remich	3	**Macher**	198	
Remich	3	**Velter-Altwies**	194	213
Remich	3	Lacroix	161	167
Remich	3	Diederich	150	
Remich	3	Beck	111	
Remich	3	**Turnout**	395	
Wiltz	3	**Mathieu**	349	
Wiltz	3	**Reding**	319	
Wiltz	3	**Charles Buffet**	307	
Wiltz	3	Wolter	162	
Wiltz	3	Nepper	95	
Wiltz	3	**Turnout**	498	
