= 1884 Luxembourg general election =

Partial general elections were held in Luxembourg on Tuesday 10 June 1884, electing members of the Chamber of Deputies. The elections took place in Echternach, Esch-sur-Alzette, Luxembourg-Campagne, Mersch, Remich, and Wiltz.

== Results ==
Under the election law at the time, any second-round run-off votes took place on the same day as the first round.

Candidates who were successful are in bold.

The results did not alter the balance of power in the Chamber: liberals continued to hold the majority. The newspaper L'indépendance luxembourgeoise classified the Deputies elected on 10 June as:

- 13 liberals
- 5 liberal-conservatives
- 5 moderate clericals
- 1 clerical

Canton	Seats	Candidate	First round	Second round
Canton	Seats	Candidate	Votes	Votes
Echternach		**Jean-Mathias Föhr (Note: Elected in the first round with an absolute majority)**	204	
Echternach		**Robert Tudor**	200	
Echternach		**Jean-Joseph Brincour**	183	
Echternach		Theisen	160	
Echternach		**Turnout**	318	
Esch-sur-Alzette		**Léon Metz**	620	
Esch-sur-Alzette		**Dominique Brasseur**	521	
Esch-sur-Alzette		**Jean-Nicolas Klensch**	491	
Esch-sur-Alzette		**Pierre Kirsch**	464	
Esch-sur-Alzette		**Théodore-Willibrord de Wacquant**	457	
Esch-sur-Alzette		Auguste Collart	436	
Esch-sur-Alzette		Charles de Tornaco	423	
Esch-sur-Alzette		**Turnout**	874	
Luxembourg-Campagne		**Charles Collart**	454	
Luxembourg-Campagne		**Adolphe Fischer**	447	
Luxembourg-Campagne		**Auguste Laval**	380	
Luxembourg-Campagne		**Charles Crocius**	346	
Luxembourg-Campagne		**Adolphe Schmit**	335	
Luxembourg-Campagne		Weiker	324	
Luxembourg-Campagne		De Colnet	263	
Luxembourg-Campagne		**Turnout**	622	
Mersch		**Amaury d'Ansembourg**	198	
Mersch		**Jean Knaff**	198	
Mersch		**Joseph Servais**	186	
Mersch		Cornette	135	
Mersch		Schröder	104	
Mersch		Lehnertz	91	
Mersch		**Turnout**	313	
Remich		**Jean-Pierre Knepper**	246	
Remich		**Jacques-Gustave Lessel**	245	
Remich		Macher	203	171
Remich		**Théodore Linden** (Note: Elected in a run-off vote)	201	236
Remich		Lacroix	103	
Remich		**Turnout**	420	
Wiltz		**Michel Weinandy**	290	
Wiltz		**Charles Buffet**	282	
Wiltz		**Edouard Wolter**	243	271
Wiltz		Mertens	196	216
Wiltz		Gruber	154	
Wiltz		Schmelzer	139	
Wiltz		Reiter	65	
Wiltz		**Turnout**	499	
