= Leddin (surname) =

Leddin is a surname. Notable people with the surname include:

- Brian Leddin (born 1979/1980), Irish politician
- Pascal Leddin (born 1999), German politician

== See also ==
- Leading
