= D'Wäschfra =

Luxembourgish satirical newspaper

- Humoristisch-satyrisches Wochenblatt
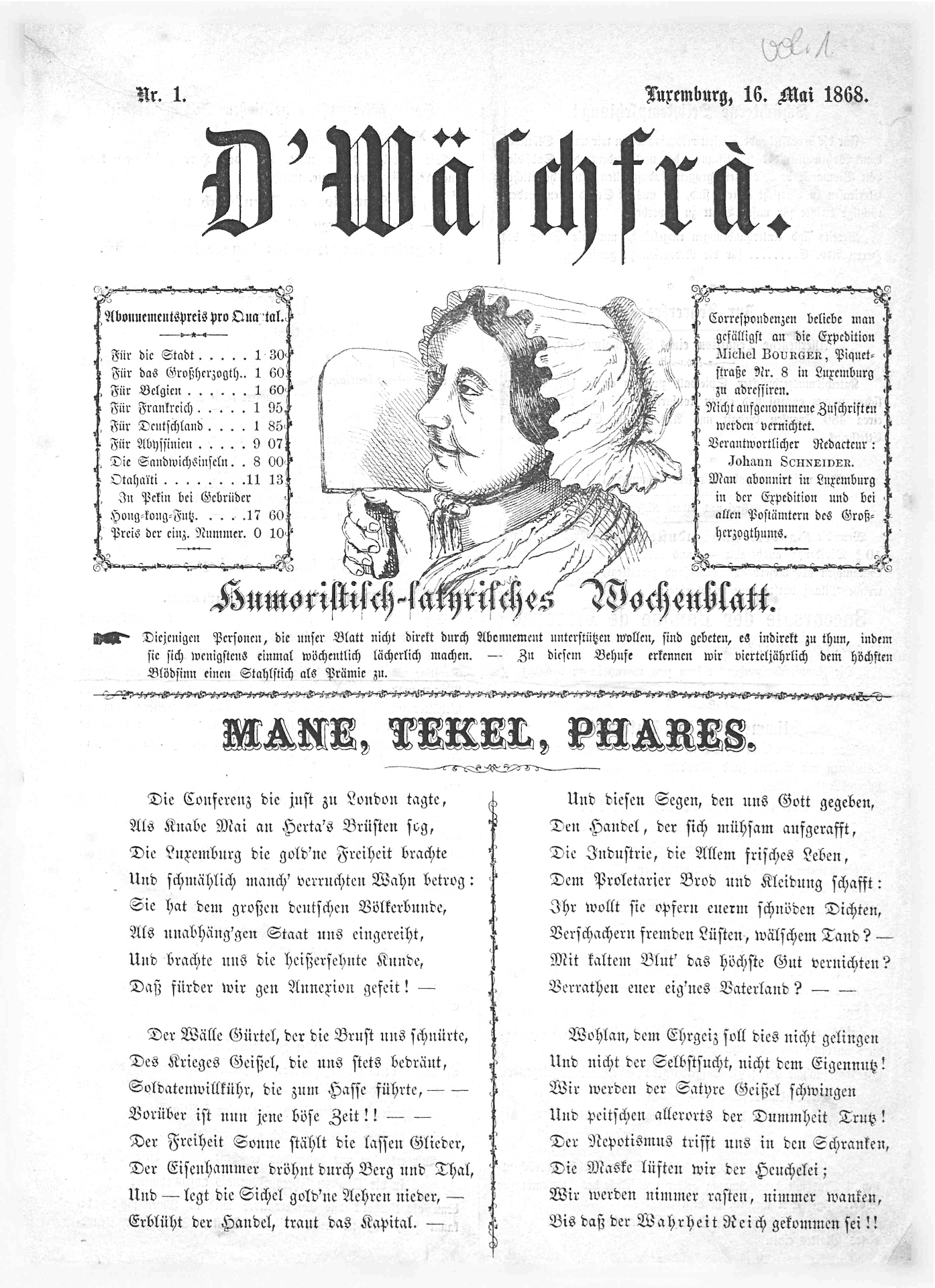
- Cover of the first issue, from 16 May 1868.
- Type: Weekly satirical newspaper
- Publisher: Michel Bourger
- Editor-in-chief: Karl Becker
- Editor: Johannes Houss; Johann Schneider
- Ceased publication: June 1884
- Language: German; Luxembourgish; French
- City: Luxembourg City
- Country: Luxembourg

D'Wäschfra. Humoristisch-satyrisches Wochenblatt (lit. 'The Washerwoman. Humoristic-satirical weekly') was the first illustrated satirical periodical in Luxembourg, (Note: The first satirical newspaper to appear in Luxembourg was L'Arlequin (1848), edited by Charles München.) published between 1868 and 1884.

== History ==
D'Wäschfra began publication on 16 May 1868. The periodical's founder and editor was Karl Becker (1834–1884), a German born in Trier who had lived in Luxembourg since childhood. Becker was never granted Luxembourgish citizenship, likely due to numerous lawsuits and controversy stemming from attacks against Luxembourgish government officials in the newspaper: between 1869 and 1873, at least 13 legal complaints were filed against Becker and his collaborators. Although Becker was responsible for editorial decisions, the paper was initially credited to a Johann Schneider and, by 30 May 1868, the editorial credit had changed hands to Johann Houss. According to literary historian Marc Thiel, both Schneider and Houss were day labourers who could neither read nor write, and were credited as a means of allowing Becker to avoid prison sentences.

D'Wäschfra was published weekly, with several exceptions due to problems with the Luxembourgish censors and the aforementioned lawsuits. It was renamed Thill Eulenspiegel from May to September 1869, Hau' ihm, Lukas! (Smack him, Lukas!) in February 1879, and D'Uoreg Zongen from April 1883 onwards. Other titles used include Eulenspiegel's Wort für Wahrheit und Recht (Eulenspiegel's Word for Truth and Justice) and Der neutrale Pulcinell (The neutral Pulcinella).

Alongside articles ridiculing Luxembourgish officials, the paper also satirized and attacked the Catholic Church (especially the Jesuits), Jews, and the peasantry. Published in the wake of the Luxembourg Crisis, the newspaper had a generally pro-German stance and was critical of Napoleon III's France.

The newspaper was circulated widely in Luxembourg and also featured subscription options for Belgium, Germany, France, Italy, Austria, and, in jest, some colonies (such as Hong Kong). The primary language of D'Wäschfra was German, although content also appeared in Luxembourgish and French. Despite its nationwide circulation, its focus was primarily on Luxembourg City and its suburbs, with the city's local politics being the subject of many editorials and caricatures.

Due to the anonymous or pseudonymous nature of much of the newspaper's content, it is difficult to parse the identities of most authors. However, well-known contributors included Michel Rodange, the author of Luxembourg's national epic Renert (inspired in part by the newspaper), and the poet Jean Henri Wachthausen. Caspar Mathias Spoo may have also been a contributor.

D'Wäschfra (then under the title D'Uoreg Zongen) ceased publication in July 1884.

== Gallery ==
Header of the issue of 28 June 1868, with the typical washerwoman header illustration.

Issue from 1883, under the name D'Uoreg Zongen.

== See also ==
- Digital collections of D'Wäschfra online on eluxemburgensia.lu.
