= 1902 Luxembourg general election =

Partial general elections were held in Luxembourg on 10 and 17 June 1902, electing 27 out of 48 members of the Chamber of Deputies.

== Results ==
| Canton | Seats | Candidate | First round | Second round |
| Canton | Seats | Candidate | Votes | Votes |
|---|---|---|---|---|
| Echternach | 3 | Jean-Mathias Föhr | 611 | |
| Echternach | 3 | Brincour | 591 | |
| Echternach | 3 | Goerg | 468 | |
| Echternach | 3 | Campill | 438 | |
| Echternach | 3 | Turnout | 861 | |
| Esch-sur-Alzette | 9 | Metz | 1,608 | |
| Esch-sur-Alzette | 9 | De Tornaco | 1,557 | |
| Esch-sur-Alzette | 9 | Steichen | 1,423 | |
| Esch-sur-Alzette | 9 | Clemang | 1,386 | |
| Esch-sur-Alzette | 9 | Brasseur | 1,311 | |
| Esch-sur-Alzette | 9 | Welter | 1,302 | 1,502 |
| Esch-sur-Alzette | 9 | Nau | 1,188 | 1,177 |
| Esch-sur-Alzette | 9 | Caspar Mathias Spoo | 1,187 | 1,316 |
| Esch-sur-Alzette | 9 | Diederich | 1,135 | 1,395 |
| Esch-sur-Alzette | 9 | Berens | 1,095 | 1,070 |
| Esch-sur-Alzette | 9 | Metzler | 1,070 | 1,309 |
| Esch-sur-Alzette | 9 | Hoffmann | 1,028 | 1,141 |
| Esch-sur-Alzette | 9 | Heymes | 935 | 1,044 |
| Esch-sur-Alzette | 9 | Marx | 901 | |
| Esch-sur-Alzette | 9 | De Gerlache | 804 | |
| Esch-sur-Alzette | 9 | Bosseler | 519 | |
| Esch-sur-Alzette | 9 | Turnout | 2,630 | |
| Luxembourg-Campagne | 6 | Bastian | 1,563 | |
| Luxembourg-Campagne | 6 | Schoué | 1,152 | |
| Luxembourg-Campagne | 6 | Diederich | 1,117 | |
| Luxembourg-Campagne | 6 | Erpelding | 1,116 | |
| Luxembourg-Campagne | 6 | Schmit | 1,062 | 1,224 |
| Luxembourg-Campagne | 6 | Crocius | 974 | 985 |
| Luxembourg-Campagne | 6 | Weicker | 908 | 684 |
| Luxembourg-Campagne | 6 | Wies | 842 | 643 |
| Luxembourg-Campagne | 6 | Turnout | - | |
| Mersch | 3 | Wilhelmy | 658 | |
| Mersch | 3 | Leibfried | 635 | |
| Mersch | 3 | Eichhorn | 616 | |
| Mersch | 3 | Weckbecker | 531 | |
| Mersch | 3 | Turnout | 975 | |
| Remich | 3 | Koepper | 574 | |
| Remich | 3 | Lacroix | 551 | |
| Remich | 3 | Velter | 435 | |
| Remich | 3 | Turnout | 817 | |
| Wiltz | 3 | Mathieu | 698 | |
| Wiltz | 3 | Thilges | 593 | |
| Wiltz | 3 | Weinandy | 553 | |
| Wiltz | 3 | Pletschette | 274 | |
| Wiltz | 3 | Turnout | - | |
Source: L'indépendance luxembourgeoise
