= Pontus Andersson =

Swedish politician (born 1992)

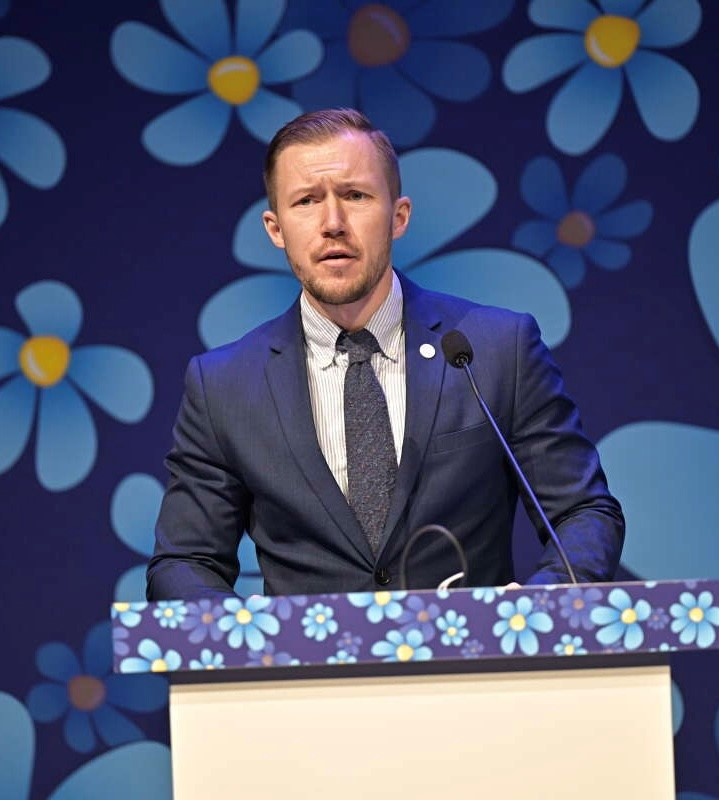

Member of the Riksdag
- Incumbent
- Assumed office 16 December 2021
- Preceded by: Ebba Hermansson
- Constituency: Skåne Western

Vice-Chairman of the Young Swedes SDU
- Incumbent
- Assumed office 1 October 2015
- Preceded by: Office established

Personal details
- Born: Lars Pontus Andersson; 2 September 1992 (age 34) Helsingborg, Sweden
- Party: Sweden Democrats
- Education: Malmö University

Lars Pontus Andersson (born 2 September 1992 in Helsingborg) is a Swedish educator and politician of the Sweden Democrats party. He has been a Member of the Riksdag since 2021.

== Biography ==
=== Early life ===
Andersson was born in 1992 and grew up in Rydebäck outside Helsingborg. He has spoken with a stammer since childhood and has discussed how it has affected some of his public speeches. Andersson studied at Malmö University before training to become a teacher. In 2014, Andersson wrote that he was fired from a teaching contract due to his association with the Sweden Democrats and because of views he had shared on Facebook criticising the European Union and giving welfare to illegal immigrants.

=== Political career ===
Andersson has been a member of the Sweden Democrats since 2014 and was elected as a municipal councilor on Helsingborg's City Council that same year. From 2014 to 2015 he was district chairman of Sweden Democratic Youth (SDU) in Skåne County, and for the 2018 Swedish general election served as a press secretary for the SD.

Following splits and controversies in the SDU during the spring of 2015, Andersson gave a series of interviews in which he criticised the more hardline stance of SDU's chairmen Gustav Kasselstrand and William Hahne. He subsequently endorsed Tobias Andersson and Dennis Dioukarev for chairmanship of the SDU over Jessica Ohlson. The trio advocated increased cooperation with the Sweden Democrats and said that the current leadership has failed in this. After Ohlson won leadership of the SDU and the Sweden Democrats announced it would cut ties with the SDU, Andersson became a founding member of the new Ungsvenskarna SDU youth-wing and was appointed vice-president.

On 4 April 2014, two men were arrested for harassing Andersson while he was making a school visit to Lund and both were ordered to pay a fine to Andersson.

In February 2017, Andersson received attention for arguing during a BBC News interview that the military should be deployed to help the police during the 2017 Rinkeby riots. A year later Swedish Prime Minister Stefan Löfven would make a similar statement. In 2021, he became a member of the Riksdag for Skåne County following the resignation of Ebba Hermansson.
