= Ebba Hermansson =

Swedish politician (born 1996)

Ebba Hermansson SD

Baby of the House
- In office 24 September 2018 – 20 September 2021
- Preceded by: Jesper Skalberg Karlsson
- Succeeded by: Axel Hallberg

Member of the Riksdag
- In office 24 September 2018 – 16 December 2021
- Constituency: Skåne Western

Personal details
- Born: 14 May 1996 (age 29) Gothenburg, Västra Götaland County, Sweden
- Party: Sweden Democrats
- Parents: Lars Grundqvist; Charlotte Hermansson

Ebba Charlotte Hermansson (born 14 May 1996) is a Swedish politician of the Sweden Democrats. She was Member of the Riksdag from September 2018 until her resignation in December 2021. She was taking up seat number 331 in the Riksdag for the constituency of Skåne Western. She was also Baby of the House from taking office. In November 2021, she announced she would not contest the next general election for personal reasons and later resigned her seat to her substitute Pontus Andersson.

She began her political career in the Sweden Democratic Youth after the 2014 general election. She was chosen as the Sweden Democrats' gender equality spokesperson in August 2018.

Honorary titles
Preceded by Jesper Skalberg Karlsson	Baby of the House; 2018–2021	Succeeded by Axel Hallberg
