= Jesper Skalberg Karlsson =

Swedish politician (born 1993)

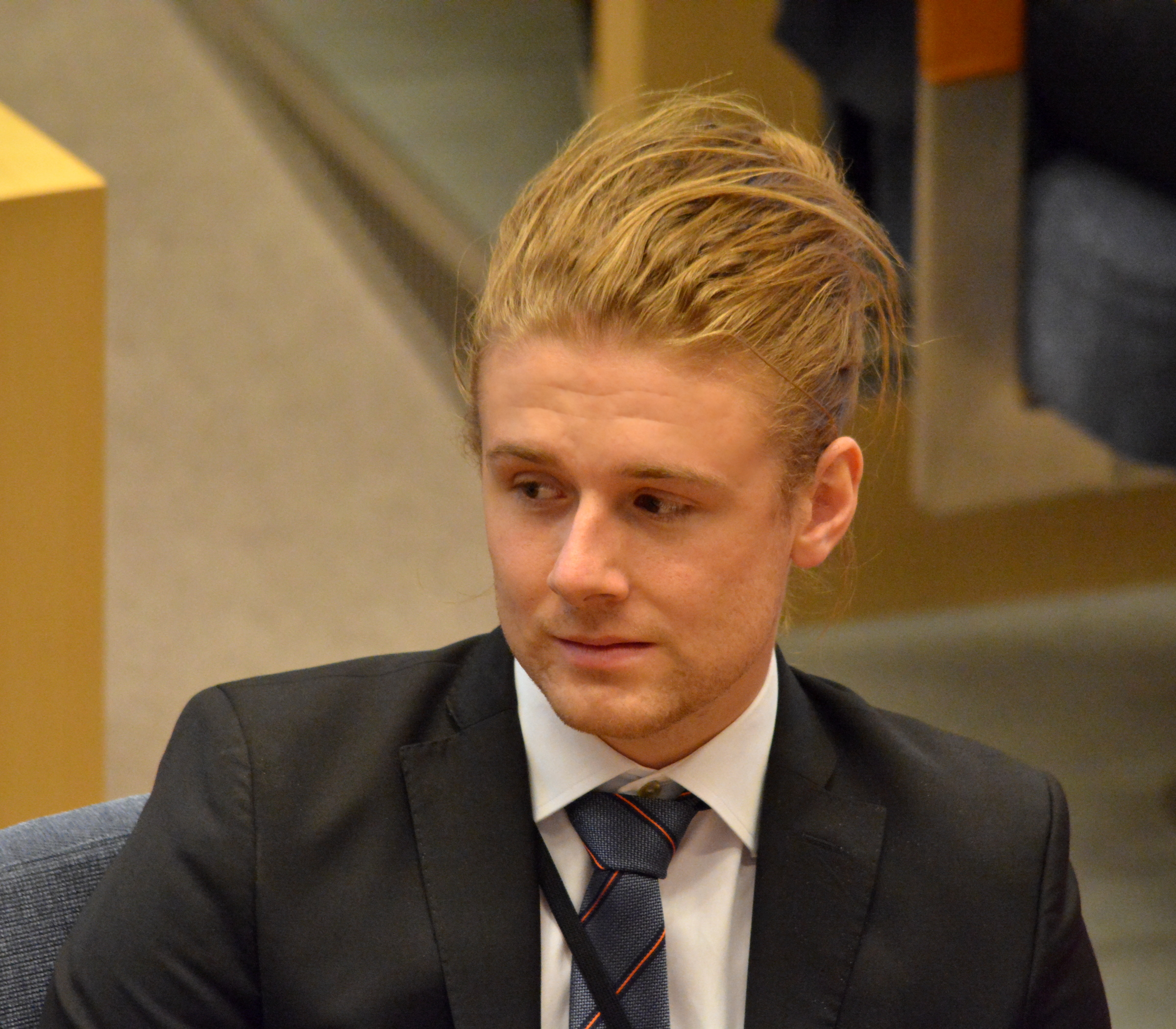

Baby of the House
- In office 19 January 2015 – 24 September 2018
- Preceded by: Dennis Dioukarev
- Succeeded by: Ebba Hermansson

Member of the Riksdag
- Incumbent
- Assumed office 11 September 2022
- In office 19 January 2015 – 24 September 2018
- Constituency: Gotland County

Personal details
- Born: 18 June 1993 (age 33) Visby, Sweden
- Party: Moderate Party

Jesper Jens Joakim Skalberg Karlsson (born 18 June 1993) is a Swedish politician of the Moderate Party. He was a Member of the Riksdag from January 2015 to September 2018, representing his home constituency Gotland County. He replaced Gustaf Hoffstedt who resigned his seat. He is also the Baby of the House since taking office, replacing Dennis Dioukarev who is only 3 months older. He regained his seat in the 2022 general election.

In the Riksdag, Skalberg Karlsson was a deputy member of the Committee on Environment and Agriculture from January 2015 and a deputy member of the Committee on European Union Affairs from November 2015.

Honorary titles
Preceded by Dennis Dioukarev	Baby of the House; 2015–2018	Succeeded by Ebba Hermansson
