= Axel Hallberg =

Swedish politician (born 1999)

Member of the Swedish Parliament
- In office 2021–2022
- Constituency: Skåne County Southern

Personal details
- Born: Axel Hallberg; 12 June 1999 (age 26)
- Party: Green Party

Axel Hallberg (born 12 June 1999) is a Swedish politician from the Green Party. He was previously associated with Young Greens. He was Baby of the House from September 2021 to May 2022.

== See also ==
- List of members of the Riksdag, 2018–2022

Honorary titles
| Preceded by Ebba Hermansson | Baby of the House; 2021–2022 | Succeeded by Tobias Andersson |
