= Gidron Maso Karipe =

Papua New Guinean politician

Member of the National Parliament of Papua New Guinea for Porgera-Paiela
- Incumbent
- Assumed office August 2025
- Preceded by: Maso Karipe

Personal details
- Party: Pangu Pati
- Relations: Maso Karipe (Father)

Gidron Maso Karipe is a Papua New Guinean politician of the Pangu Pati. He won election to the National Parliament of Papua New Guinea in a 2025 by-election to replace his father. He contested the election as an Independent, but joined Pangu Pati upon winning the election.

Upon his election, Karipe shared plans to support his district's natural resource-rich economy, including supporting the Porgera Gold Mine. It is believed he is the youngest member of the Papua New Guinea Parliament.
