= Jasper Balke =

German politician (born 1997)

Member of the Landtag of Schleswig-Holstein
- Incumbent
- Assumed office 7 June 2022

Personal details
- Born: 29 October 1997 (age 27); Braunschweig, Germany
- Political party: Alliance 90/The Greens

Jasper Balke (born 29 October 1997) is a German politician from the Alliance 90/The Greens. He has been a member of the Landtag of Schleswig-Holstein since 7 June 2022.

== Life and politics ==
Balke graduated from the Hoffmann-von-Fallersleben School in Braunschweig in 2016. In 2016/2017 he completed a voluntary social year in nursing in Magdeburg. In 2018 he began studying human medicine at the University of Lübeck with a scholarship from the Heinrich Böll Foundation.

In the same year, Balke joined the Alliance 90/The Greens party and joined the Green Youth. He was political director of the Green Youth Lübeck and from 2019 to 2021 state spokesman for the Green Youth Schleswig-Holstein. In 2019, he was elected district chairman of Alliance 90/The Greens in Lübeck.

In the 2022 Schleswig-Holstein state election, Balke ran eighth on the Green Party's state list and as a direct candidate in the Lübeck-Süd constituency. He received 34.4 percent of the first votes ahead of Anette Röttger (CDU) with 27.9 and was directly elected. At the age of 24, he entered the state parliament as the youngest parliamentarian and one of three constituency winners of his party. He is a member of the Social Committee and a deputy member of the Education Committee.
