= Maso Karipe =

Papua New Guinean businessman and politician (died 2023)

- Karipe in his official 2022 portrait

Member of the National Parliament of Papua New Guinea for Porgera-Paiela
- In office 22 July 2022 – 7 November 2023
- Preceded by: constituency established
- Succeeded by: Gidron Maso Karipe

Personal details
- Died: 7 November 2023 Brisbane, Queensland, Australia
- Party: Pangu Pati
- Relations: Gidron Karipe (Son)
- Occupation: Businessman

Maso Karipe (died 7 November 2023) was a Papua New Guinean politician of the Pangu Party.

== Biography ==
The customary indigenous co-owner of the Porgera Gold Mine, Karipe was one of the community representatives with the Canadian mining company Barrick Gold. In response to violence within his community, he donated five tires to the local police to replace the used tires on their vehicles.

In the 2022 legislative election, Karipe was an independent candidate for the newly created constituency of Porgera-Paiela. Shortly before election day, his personal property was destroyed by armed men from a neighboring community. However, he was still victorious on the platform of restoring security and order to his constituency, and he joined the Pangu Party shortly after entering Parliament.

Speaking in Parliament after his election, Karipe announced that the intense violence made it difficult to reopen the Porgera Gold Mine and obtained funds allocated for maintaining order in Porgera. He used his parliamentary funds to pay the tuition fees of students in his constituency, as well as to contribute to maintaining order.

The Porgera mine was partially nationalized at the end of 2022, with the Papua New Guinean government owning 36%, the indigenous community owning 15%, and Barrick Gold owning 49%.

Suffering from stomach cancer, Maso Karipe frequently travelled to Australia beginning October 2022. He died in Brisbane on 7 November 2023.

He was succeeded in a by-election by his son, Gidron Maso Karipe.
