= 1863 Luxembourg general election =

Partial general elections were held in Luxembourg on 9 June 1863, electing members of the Assembly of Estates. The elections took place in Luxembourg-City, Capellen, Diekirch, Grevenmacher, Redange, Clervaux, and Vianden.

== Results ==
Candidates who were successful are in bold.

Under the election system at the time, any second-round run-off votes took place on the same day as the first round.

Canton	Seats	Affiliation	Candidate	First round	Second round
Canton	Seats	Affiliation	Candidate	Votes	Votes
Luxembourg-Ville		Liberal	**Théodore Pescatore**	334	
Luxembourg-Ville		Liberal	**Auguste Fischer**	240	
Luxembourg-Ville		Liberal	**Charles André**	208	
Luxembourg-Ville		Clerical	Charles Simonis	174	
Luxembourg-Ville			Nicolas Bodson	129	
Luxembourg-Ville			**Turnout**	376	
Capellen		Liberal	**Norbert Metz**	239	
Capellen		Liberal	**Jules Metz**	189	
Capellen		Clerical	Risch	105	
Capellen			**Turnout**	288	
Diekirch		Liberal	**De Blochausen**	233	
Diekirch			**Tschiederer**	225	
Diekirch		Liberal	**E. Vannerus**	211	
Diekirch			Ulrich	208	
Diekirch			Angelsberg	139	
Diekirch			Schmit	133	
Diekirch			**Turnout**	406	
Grevenmacher		Liberal	**Michel Fohl**	200	
Grevenmacher			**Jean-Pierre Klein**	142	
Grevenmacher			**André**	136	
Grevenmacher		Liberal	Ritter	131	
Grevenmacher		Liberal	Putz	118	
Grevenmacher			**Turnout**	n/a	
Redange		Liberal	**Kellen**	243	
Redange			**Jacques**	195	
Redange		Liberal	Glesener	150	
Redange			**Turnout**	n/a	
Clervaux			**Toutsch**	136	
Clervaux			**Arens**	136	
Clervaux			Rischard	76	
Clervaux			Schiltz	74	
Clervaux			**Turnout**	n/a	
Vianden		Clerical	**Sinner (Note: Elected after a run-off round)**	29	
Vianden		Clerical	Gödert	15	
Vianden		Clerical	Salner	11	
Vianden		Liberal	André	5	
Vianden			**Turnout**	n/a	
