= Claudia Dall'Agnol =

Luxembourgish politician (born 1973)

Member of the Chamber of Deputies from South
- In office 3 August 2004 – 2018

Alderman for Dudelange
- Incumbent
- Assumed office December 2014

Member of the Dudelange municipal council
- Incumbent
- Assumed office October 1999

Personal details
- Born: 6 April 1973 (age 52); Esch-sur-Alzette, Luxembourg
- Political party: Luxembourg Socialist Workers' Party

Claudia Dall'Agnol (born 6 April 1973) is a Luxembourgish politician. She served as a member of the Chamber of Deputies from 2004 to 2018, representing the South constituency.

== Life and career ==
Dall'Agnol was born on 6 April 1973 in Esch-sur-Alzette to Italian parents. She joined the Luxembourg Socialist Workers' Party (LSAP) in 1996. In 1999, she became president of the Luxembourg Socialist Youths. Dall'Agnol became president of the Femmes Socialistes circa 2003. In March 2010, she retired and was succeeded by Michèle Diederich. According to a 2011 article in RTL Lëtzebuerg, Dall'Agnol was president of the Luxembourg Shooting Federation. She remained president in 2019.

In October 1999, Dall'Agnol became a member of the municipal council of Dudelange. In December 2014, Dall'Agnol became an alderman for Dudelange. Dall'Agnol was first elected to the Chamber of Deputies in the 2004 general election, placing eleventh on the LSAP list with 17,936 votes. She was inaugurated on 3 August. Dall'Agnol was re-elected in 2009 and 2013. In January 2018, Dall'Agnol was a co-author of an open letter, alongside 9 other LSAP members of the Chamber of Deputies, that demanded the party focus on young voters and women. Later that year in the general election, Dall'Agnol lost her seat in the Chamber. She was a candidate in the 2023 election to the Chamber of Deputies; however, she failed to regain her seat.

== Personal life ==
Dall'Agnol speaks Dutch, Italian, Spanish, Luxembourgish, German, English, and French.
