= 1869 Luxembourg general election =

Partial general elections were held in Luxembourg on 8 June 1869, electing 20 members of the Chamber of Deputies. The elections took place in Capellen, Clervaux, Diekirch, Grevenmacher, Luxembourg City, Redange, and Vianden.

== Results ==
Candidates who were successful are in bold.

Under the election system at the time, any second-round run-off votes took place on the same day as the first round.

The election brought some changes to the Chamber's composition, with the election of 9 new Deputies: Simons, Funck, Hamelius, Pauly, Salentiny, Salentiny, Tschiderer, Hess, and Berger.

Canton	Seats	Candidate	First round	Second round
Canton	Seats	Candidate	Votes	Votes
Capellen		**Risch**	319	
Capellen		**Norbert Metz**	308	
Capellen		**Camile Funck**	305	
Capellen		Kirpach	240	
Capellen		**Turnout**	n/a	
Clervaux		**Conzemius** (Note: Elected at the first round)	313	
Clervaux		**Toutsch**	221	
Clervaux		**Hamelius**	191	
Clervaux		Fallis	102	
Clervaux		Arens	73	
Clervaux		**Turnout**	323	
Diekirch		**Félix de Blochausen**	431	
Diekirch		**Victor Tschiderer**	357	
Diekirch		**Ernest François**	333	
Diekirch		**J. P. Salentiny**	281	
Diekirch		Schmit	268	
Diekirch		**Turnout**	520	
Grevenmacher		**N. Salentiny**	243	
Grevenmacher		**Hess**	233	
Grevenmacher		De Muyser	170	186
Grevenmacher		**Klein (Note: Elected after a run-off round)**	164	188
Grevenmacher		Clasen	126	
Grevenmacher		André	87	
Grevenmacher		**Turnout**	n/a	
Luxembourg-Ville		**Antoine Pescatore**	307	
Luxembourg-Ville		**Charles Théodore André**	254	
Luxembourg-Ville		**Charles J. Simons**	245	
Luxembourg-Ville		Charles Simonis	197	
Luxembourg-Ville		E. Aschman	191	
Luxembourg-Ville		A. Fischer	27	
Luxembourg-Ville		E. Fischer	12	
Luxembourg-Ville		Ch. Kuntgen	3	
Luxembourg-Ville		N. Metz	1	
Luxembourg-Ville		Ch. Kiefer	1	
Luxembourg-Ville		Godart	1	
Luxembourg-Ville		**Turnout**	436	
Redange		**Berger**	369	
Redange		**Leopold Bian**	286	
Redange		**Jacques**	245	303
Redange		Hippert	229	134
Redange		Gläsener	155	
Redange		**Turnout**	n/a	
Vianden		**Adolphe Pauly**	65	
Vianden		Sinner	25	
Vianden		**Turnout**	n/a	
