= 1875 Luxembourg general election =

Partial general elections were held in Luxembourg on 9 June 1875, electing members of the Chamber of Deputies. The elections took place in Capellen, Clervaux, Diekirch, Grevenmacher, Luxembourg City, Redange, and Vianden.

== Results ==
Candidates who were successful are in bold.

The electoral system provided for run-off votes, but in this case all successful candidates were elected after only one round with an absolute majority.

Canton	Seats	Candidate	Votes
Capellen	3	**Norbert Metz**	427
Capellen	3	**Funck**	395
Capellen	3	**Kirpach**	381
Capellen	3	**Turnout**	471
Clervaux	3	**Joseph Conzemius**	363
Clervaux	3	**Théodore-Arthur Bouvier**	335
Clervaux	3	**Urbin**	325
Clervaux	3	Hamelius	143
Clervaux	3	Toutsch	23
Clervaux	3	**Turnout**	406
Diekirch	4	**Pierre Toussaint**	341
Diekirch	4	**Victor Tschiderer**	308
Diekirch	4	**Jean-Pierre Salentiny**	301
Diekirch	4	**Mergen**	291
Diekirch	4	Steichen	228
Diekirch	4	Schmit	172
Diekirch	4	**Turnout**	535
Grevenmacher	3	**Victor Schoren**	339
Grevenmacher	3	**Félix Putz**	337
Grevenmacher	3	**Zénon de Muyser**	313
Grevenmacher	3	**Turnout**	361
Luxembourg-Ville	3	**Charles-Jean Simons**	361
Luxembourg-Ville	3	**Antoine Pescatore**	311
Luxembourg-Ville	3	**Simonis**	309
Luxembourg-Ville	3	Mersch-Wittenauer	212
Luxembourg-Ville	3	**Turnout**	541
Redange	3	**Berger**	359
Redange	3	**Rénilde-Guillaume Jacques**	355
Redange	3	**Jean Orianne**	327
Redange	3	Bian	291
Redange	3	**Turnout**	580
Vianden	1	**Adolphe Pauly**	65
Vianden	1	Tibesar	20
Vianden	1	**Turnout**	86

== Aftermath ==
A by-election in Grevenmacher was soon organised for 27 July, as Victor Schoren, one of the Grevenmacher Deputies, had been appointed commissioner of the district of Grevenmacher.

Another by-election had to be organised for Vianden, as Adolphe Pauly soon resigned; the election date was set for 15 November. This resulted in the election of Camille Dumont, who was supported by the Blochausen government.
