= Pascal Leddin =

German politician (born 1999)

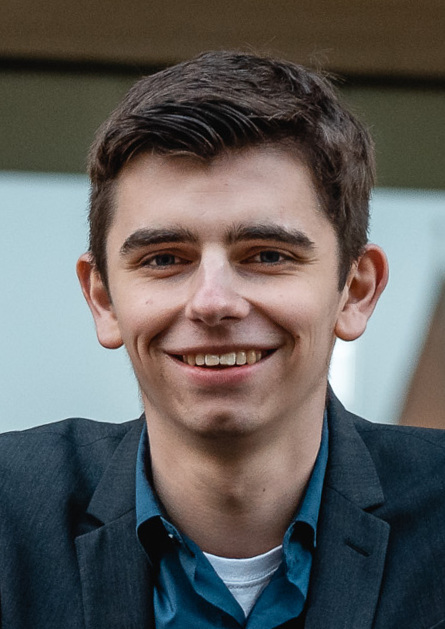
Pascal Leddin in 2022.

Pascal Leddin (born 1999 in Uelzen) is a German politician from Alliance 90/The Greens. He was elected to the Landtag of Lower Saxony in the 2022 Lower Saxony state election. At the age of 23 he became the youngest member of the Lower Saxony parliament.
