= Angela Raffa =

Italian politician (born 1993)

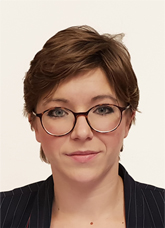
- Raffa in 2018

Member of the Chamber of Deputies
- Incumbent
- Assumed office 23 March 2018
- Constituency: Sicily 2 – 01 (2018–2022); Sicily 2 – 01 (2022–present)

Personal details
- Born: 26 January 1993 (age 33) Messina, Italy
- Party: Five Star Movement
- Education: University of Messina

Angela Raffa (born 26 January 1993) is an Italian politician serving as a member of the Chamber of Deputies since 2018. She was the youngest member of parliament elected in the 2018 general election.
