= 1905 Luxembourg general election =

Partial general elections were held in Luxembourg on 13 and 20 June 1905, electing 21 out of 48 members of the Chamber of Deputies.

== Results ==
| Canton | Seats | Candidate | First round | Second round |
| Canton | Seats | Candidate | Votes | Votes |
|---|---|---|---|---|
| Capellen | 3 | Guillaume Jeitz | 908 | |
| Capellen | 3 | Jacques Schmitz | 868 | |
| Capellen | 3 | Edouard Hemmer | 788 | |
| Capellen | 3 | Ch. Risch | 528 | |
| Capellen | 3 | Turnout | 1,301 | |
| Clervaux | 3 | Émile Prüm | 711 | |
| Clervaux | 3 | Jean-Pierre Jérôme Thinnes | 669 | |
| Clervaux | 3 | Nicolas Cariers | 551 | |
| Clervaux | 3 | Bouvier | 525 | |
| Clervaux | 3 | Turnout | 1,060 | |
| Diekirch | 4 | Nicolas-Pierre Kunnen | 977 | |
| Diekirch | 4 | Frédéric François | 923 | |
| Diekirch | 4 | Joseph Neumann | 830 | |
| Diekirch | 4 | Nicolas Meris | 761 | |
| Diekirch | 4 | Turnout | 1,521 | |
| Grevenmacher | 3 | Philippe Bech | 910 | |
| Grevenmacher | 3 | Félix Putz | 603 | 678 |
| Grevenmacher | 3 | Jean-Baptiste Didier | 609 | 661 |
| Grevenmacher | 3 | Schmit | 518 | 536 |
| Grevenmacher | 3 | Donkel | 524 | 482 |
| Grevenmacher | 3 | Turnout | 1,275 | 1,268 |
| Luxembourg-Ville | 4 | Alphonse Munchen | 725 | 945 |
| Luxembourg-Ville | 4 | Luc Housse | 733 | 931 |
| Luxembourg-Ville | 4 | Robert Brasseur | 703 | 925 |
| Luxembourg-Ville | 4 | Jean-Pierre Probst | 718 | 887 |
| Luxembourg-Ville | 4 | Reuter | 650 | 712 |
| Luxembourg-Ville | 4 | Thilmany | 86 | 62 |
| Luxembourg-Ville | 4 | de la Fontaine | 112 | 49 |
| Luxembourg-Ville | 4 | Léon Rischard | 356 | 39 |
| Luxembourg-Ville | 4 | Turnout | 1,533 | 1,653 |
| Redange | 3 | Pierre Schiltz | 910 | |
| Redange | 3 | Félix Bian | 821 | |
| Redange | 3 | Jean Orianne | 662 | |
| Redange | 3 | Lenger | 512 | |
| Redange | 3 | Hemes | 390 | |
| Redange | 3 | Turnout | 1,332 | |
| Vianden | 1 | Nicolas-Victor Hess | 118 | |
| Vianden | 1 | Théodore Klees | 108 | |
| Vianden | 1 | Turnout | 229 | |
Source: L'indépendance luxembourgeoise
