= Léon Metzler =

Luxembourgish footballer

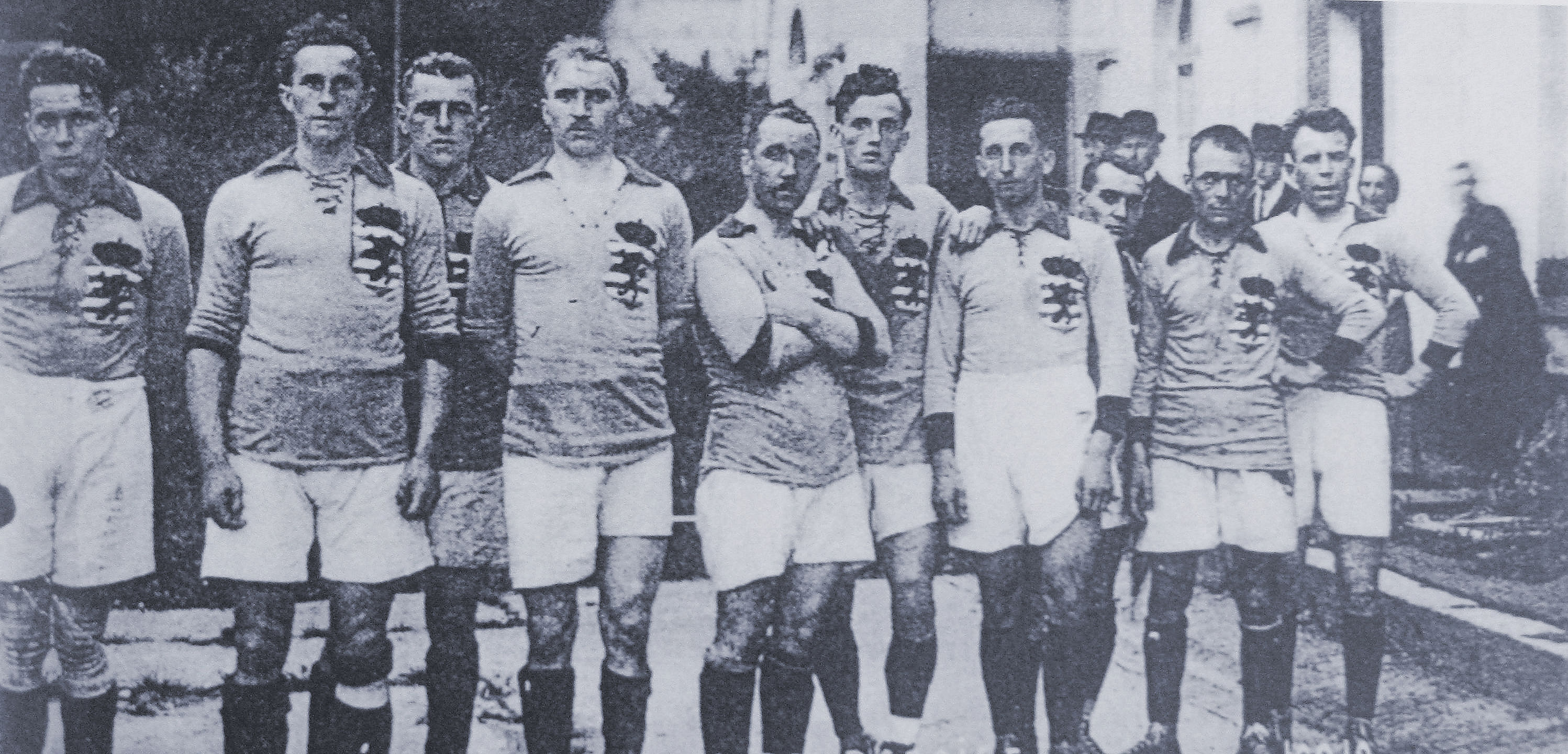
- Luxembourg national football team 1920 year

Personal information
- Nationality: Luxembourgish
- Born: 4 May 1896
- Died: 13 March 1930 (aged 33)

Sport
- Sport: Football

Léon Metzler (4 May 1896 – 13 March 1930) was a Luxembourgish football player who played for the club FCM Young Boys Diekirch. He played with the Luxembourgian national team at the 1920 Summer Olympics in Antwerp.
