= L'indépendance luxembourgeoise =

L'indépendance luxembourgeoise was a French-language daily newspaper in Luxembourg, published from 1871 to 1934. It was founded by Jean Joris. After his death in 1893, it appeared under the printer-publisher Joseph Beffort (1845–1923) and his successors. Its editors, contributors and managers included Etienne Hamélius (1856–1929), Joseph Hansen (1874–1952), Charles Becker (1881–1952), Marcel Noppeney (1877–1966) and Paul Weber (1898–1976).

== History ==
After Jean Joris had ceased to publish L'Avenir, the first issue of L’indépendance luxembourgeoise appeared on 1 October 1871, which Joris would publish until his death in 1893.

Where others had failed to found another daily on the small Luxembourgish market, faced with older titles that had existed for some decades, Joris experienced remarkable success: his newspaper would appear for more than 60 years. He had discovered a niche for a French-language newspaper. It was possibly the most successful newspaper creation of the years following the Franco-Prussian War. L’indépendance considered itself pro-government and on the side of civil servants, but also wanted to appear more or less neutral, likely in order to not scare off any potential readers. Its commentaries were often affected and sanctimonious in tone. In spite of everything, it was accused by the Journal de Luxembourg of being hostile to religion.

Its four pages, divided into four columns, started with international news and an arts section, followed by national news and readers' letters on page 2. On page 3 there followed, apart from a "Miscellaneous" section, adverts and notices which continued on the last page. Court judgements, reports from the Chamber of Deputies, numerous items of international affairs, extracts from the Mémorial (the government gazette) and a press review, were all part of an aim to offer a complete newspaper which would the purchase of other titles unnecessary. L’indépendance was a profitable enterprise, judging by the number of highly varied visual advertisements, with display ads and different fonts and illustrations, for very different consumer goods – chocolate, lottery tickets, clothes, binoculars, wigs, or tobacco.

The last edition that has been preserved is dated 31 December 1934.
