= 1881 Luxembourg general election =

Partial general elections were held in Luxembourg on 14 June 1881, electing members of the Chamber of Deputies. The elections took place in Capellen, Clervaux, Diekirch, Esch-sur-Alzette, Grevenmacher, Luxembourg-Ville, Redange, and Vianden.

Under the election law at the time, any second-round run-off votes took place on the same day as the first round.

== Results ==
After the election results were reported, the newspaper L'indépendance luxembourgeoise declared that the Chamber of Deputies now consisted of 26 liberals, nine conservative liberals and seven extreme clericals (Knepper, Theisen, Breisdorff, Fallize, Jacques, Cariers and De la Fontaine).

In November 1881 the Chamber refused to validate the election of the Vianden candidate, François Berger, as he had not been domiciled in Luxembourg at the time of the election as required; a by-election was subsequently organised for 7 December. In the by-election, Hess received 29 votes, Schaack 26, Berger 11 and Kimmer 11, with 79 votes cast. Schaack won the subsequent run-off vote against Hess, and was elected.

Candidates who were successful are in bold.

Canton	Seats	Candidate	First round	Second round
Canton	Seats	Candidate	Votes	Votes
Capellen		**Norbert Metz (Note: Elected in the first round)**	248	
Capellen		**Edouard Hemmer**	246	
Capellen		**Théodore Risch**	219	
Capellen		Th. Kirpach	203	
Capellen		Krier	168	
Capellen		**Turnout**	423	
Clervaux		**Jean-Baptiste Fallize**	227	
Clervaux		**Nicolas Cariers**	180	
Clervaux		**Joseph Conzemius** (Note: Elected in a run-off)	173	200
Clervaux		Théodore-Arthur Bouvier	157	
Clervaux		**Turnout**	358	
Diekirch		**Victor Tschiderer**	436	
Diekirch		**Pierre Toussaint**	365	
Diekirch		**Jean-Pierre Salentiny**	361	
Diekirch		**Gabriel-Nicolas-Gustave de Marie**	351	
Diekirch		**Turnout**	581	
Esch-sur-Alzette		**Charles de Tornaco**	401	
Esch-sur-Alzette		Schmit	223	
Esch-sur-Alzette		Klensch	131	
Esch-sur-Alzette		**Turnout**	773	
Grevenmacher		**Zénon de Muyser**	265	
Grevenmacher		**Félix Putz**	234	
Grevenmacher		**Michel Fohl**	216	
Grevenmacher		**Turnout**	419	
Luxembourg-Ville		**Tony Dutreux**	349	
Luxembourg-Ville		**Antoine Pescatore**	339	
Luxembourg-Ville		**Charles-Jean Simons**	337	
Luxembourg-Ville		Aschman	242	
Luxembourg-Ville		De Scherff	221	
Luxembourg-Ville		Herriges	88	
Luxembourg-Ville		**Turnout**	576	
Redange		**Nicolas Breisdorff**	331	
Redange		**Rénilde-Guillaume Jacques**	317	
Redange		**Jean Orianne**	245	283
Redange		Schlesser	155	
Redange		**Turnout**	547	
Vianden		**François Berger**	55	
Vianden		Salner	18	
Vianden		**Turnout**	82	
