= 1866 Luxembourg general election =

Partial general elections were held in Luxembourg on 12 June 1866, electing members of the Assembly of Estates. The elections took place in Luxembourg-Campagne, Esch-sur-Alzette, Echternach, Mersch, Remich, and Wiltz.

== Results ==
Candidates who were successful are in bold.

Under the election law at the time, any second-round run-off votes took place on the same day as the first round.

Canton	Seats	Candidate	First round	Second round
Canton	Seats	Candidate	Votes	Votes
Luxembourg-Campagne		**Adolphe Fischer (Note: Elected at the first round)**		
Luxembourg-Campagne		**Dominique Stifft**		
Luxembourg-Campagne		**De Colnet-d'Huart**		
Luxembourg-Campagne		Eberhardt		
Luxembourg-Campagne		**Turnout**		
Esch-sur-Alzette		**Arnould de Tornaco**	227	
Esch-sur-Alzette		**A. Brasseur (Note: Elected after a run-off round)**		
Esch-sur-Alzette		**Graas**		
Esch-sur-Alzette		De Wacquant		
Esch-sur-Alzette		Steichen		
Esch-sur-Alzette		Collart		
Esch-sur-Alzette		**Turnout**	365	
Echternach		**Michel Witry**	119	
Echternach		**Jean-Mathias Föhr**	117	
Echternach		Brymmeier	30	
Echternach		**Turnout**	140	
Mersch		**H. Witry**	141	
Mersch		**J. P. Fischer**	139	
Mersch		**Turnout**	141	
Remich		**Jacques-Guillaume Lessel**		
Remich		**Würth**		
Remich		**Turnout**		
Wiltz		**Jean-Joseph-Georges Faber-Knepper**		
Wiltz		**Michel Servais**		
Wiltz		**Paul Eyschen**		
Wiltz		Henri Greisch		
Wiltz		François		
Wiltz		Michel Fallis		
Wiltz		**Turnout**		
