= 1899 Luxembourg general election =

Partial general elections were held in Luxembourg on 13 and 20 June 1899, electing 21 out of 48 members of the Chamber of Deputies.

== Results ==
| Canton | Seats | Candidate | First round | Second round |
| Canton | Seats | Candidate | Votes | Votes |
|---|---|---|---|---|
| Capellen | 3 | Edouard Hemmer | 607 | |
| Capellen | 3 | J. Schmitz | 548 | |
| Capellen | 3 | Théodore Risch | 466 | |
| Capellen | 3 | J. P. Knepper | 362 | |
| Capellen | 3 | Marx | 282 | |
| Capellen | 3 | Turnout | 907 | |
| Clervaux | 3 | Émile Prüm | 492 | |
| Clervaux | 3 | J. J. P. Thinnes | 474 | |
| Clervaux | 3 | N. Carriers | 418 | |
| Clervaux | 3 | Bouvier | 281 | |
| Clervaux | 3 | Turnout | 689 | |
| Diekirch | 4 | Pemmers | 674 | |
| Diekirch | 4 | Salentiny | 609 | |
| Diekirch | 4 | De Blochausen | 573 | |
| Diekirch | 4 | François | 565 | |
| Diekirch | 4 | Scholtes | 545 | |
| Diekirch | 4 | De Marie | 386 | |
| Diekirch | 4 | Turnout | 1,052 | |
| Grevenmacher | 3 | Philippe Bech | 580 | |
| Grevenmacher | 3 | F. Pütz | 504 | |
| Grevenmacher | 3 | J. B. Didier | 476 | |
| Grevenmacher | 3 | A. Duscher | 403 | |
| Grevenmacher | 3 | Turnout | 840 | |
| Luxembourg City | | Simons | 652 | |
| Luxembourg City | | Robert Brasseur | 563 | 658 |
| Luxembourg City | | Émile Mousel | 542 | 564 |
| Luxembourg City | | E. Simonis | 443 | 387 |
| Luxembourg City | | Michel Welter | 443 | 502 |
| Luxembourg City | | Leo Rischard | 426 | 644 |
| Luxembourg City | | N. Pies | 284 | 213 |
| Luxembourg City | | Luc. Housse | 267 | |
| Luxembourg City | | J. Herriges | 233 | |
| Luxembourg City | | N. Wies | 183 | |
| Luxembourg City | | Turnout | 1,303 | 1,303 |
| Redange | | Leopold Bian | 589 | |
| Redange | | Lenger | 490 | |
| Redange | | Jean Orianne | 346 | 340 |
| Redange | | P. Hemes | 343 | 407 |
| Redange | | Krier | 301 | |
| Redange | | Turnout | 932 | |
| Vianden | | Viktor Hess | 83 | |
| Vianden | | Th. Klees-Cherer | 76 | |
| Vianden | | Turnout | 161 | |
Source: L'indépendance luxembourgeoise
