= 1887 Luxembourg general election =

Partial general elections were held in Luxembourg on 14 June 1887, electing 21 members of the Chamber of Deputies. The elections took place in Capellen, Clervaux, Diekirch, Esch-sur-Alzette, Grevenmacher, Luxembourg-Ville, Redange, and Vianden.

Under the election law at the time, any second-round run-off votes took place on the same day as the first round.

== Results ==
Candidates who were successful are in bold.

Canton	Seats	Candidate	First round	Second round
Canton	Seats	Candidate	Votes	Votes
Capellen	3	**Edouard Hemmer**	351	
Capellen	3	**Théodore Risch**	320	
Capellen	3	**Norbert Metz**	316	
Capellen	3	**Turnout**	401	
Clervaux	3	**Joseph Conzemius**	237	
Clervaux	3	**Théodore-Arthur Bouvier**	213	
Clervaux	3	Carriers	165	107
Clervaux	3	**Kneip-Arens**	164	201
Clervaux	3	Ensch	-	
Clervaux	3	**Turnout**	333	308
Diekirch	4	**Victor Tschiderer**	387	
Diekirch	4	**Pierre Toussaint**	360	
Diekirch	4	**Jean-Pierre Scholtes**	335	
Diekirch	4	**Félix de Blochausen**	338	
Diekirch	4	**Turnout**	447	
Esch-sur-Alzette	1	**Auguste Collart**	480	
Esch-sur-Alzette	1	Diederich-Kellen	363	
Esch-sur-Alzette	1	**Turnout**	843	
Grevenmacher	3	**Zénon de Muyser**	305	
Grevenmacher	3	**Philippe Bech**	277	
Grevenmacher	3	**Félix Putz**	227	245
Grevenmacher	3	Mathias Mehlen	171	208
Grevenmacher	3	Michel Fohl	138	
Grevenmacher	3	Dietz	69	
Grevenmacher	3	**Turnout**	481	262
Luxembourg-Ville	3	**Paul de Scherff**	388	
Luxembourg-Ville	3	**Charles-Jean Simons**	354	
Luxembourg-Ville	3	**Emmanuel Servais**	352	
Luxembourg-Ville	3	Herriges	337	
Luxembourg-Ville	3	**Turnout**	624	
Redange	3	**Bernard Krier**	345	
Redange	3	**Pierre Hemes**	285	
Redange	3	**Jean Orianne**	251	294
Redange	3	Jacques	192	192
Redange	3	**Turnout**	506	506
Vianden	1	**Michel Auguste Witry**	46	
Vianden	1	Salner	23	
Vianden	1	**Turnout**	75	
