= Dennis Dioukarev =

Swedish politician (born 1993)

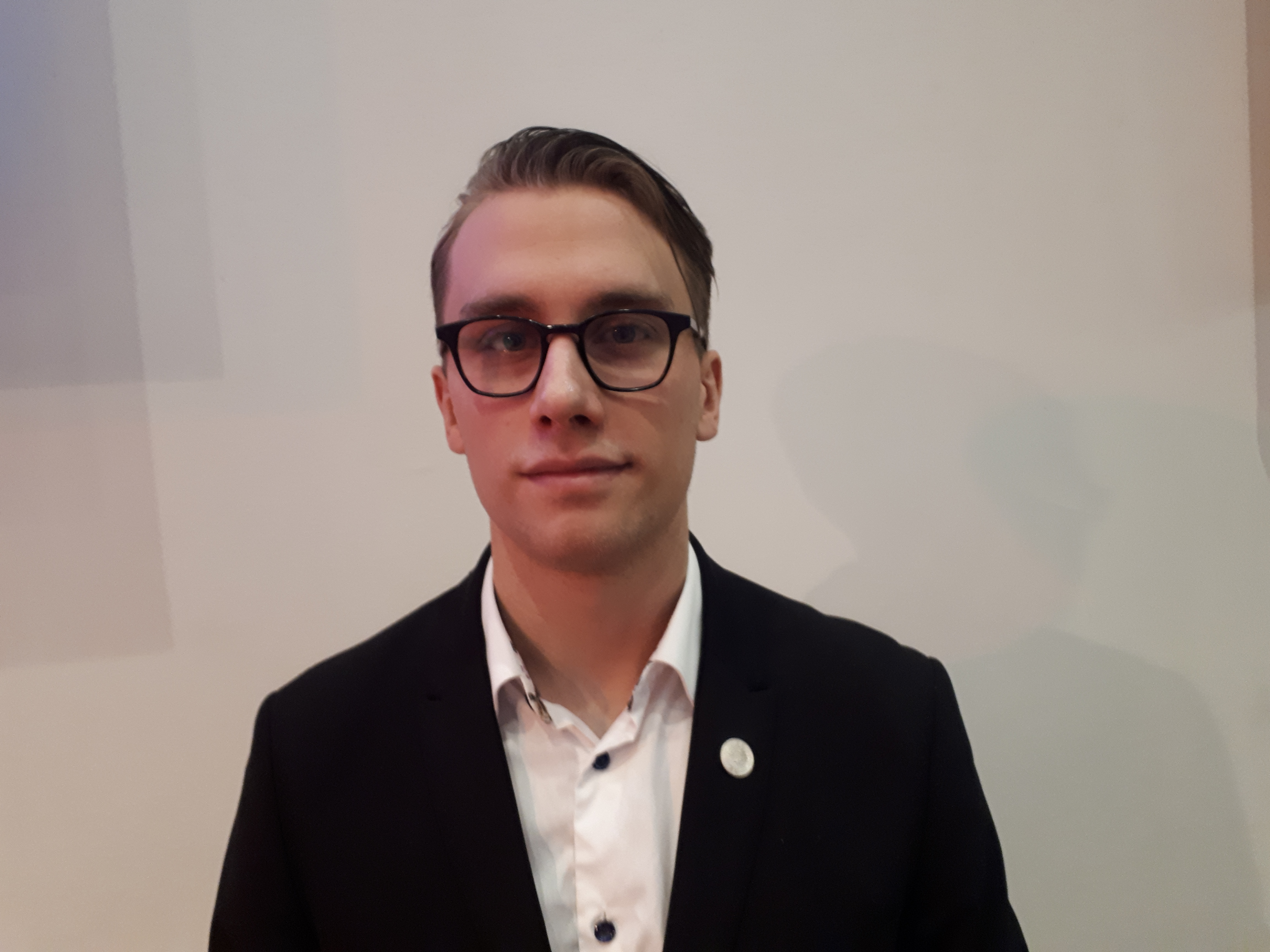
- Dennis Dioukarev in 2019

Member of the Riksdag
- Incumbent
- Assumed office 24 September 2018
- Constituency: Gothenburg Municipality
- In office 29 September 2014 – 24 September 2018
- Constituency: Jönköping County

Personal details
- Born: 23 March 1993 (age 33) Gothenburg, Sweden
- Party: Sweden Democrats
- Education: Linnaeus University

Dennis Dioukarev (born 23 March 1993), is a Swedish politician of the Sweden Democrats. He has been a Member of the Riksdag since 2014. He was the Baby of the House from 2014 to 2015, as the youngest incumbent MP.

In the Riksdag, he sits in the Committee on Finance and as a deputy of the Committee on Taxation and of the Swedish Delegation to the Nordic Council.

Honorary titles
| Preceded by Anton Abele | Baby of the House; 2014–2015 | Succeeded by Jesper Skalberg Karlsson |
