= Auguste Laval =

Luxembourgian politician (1843–1915)

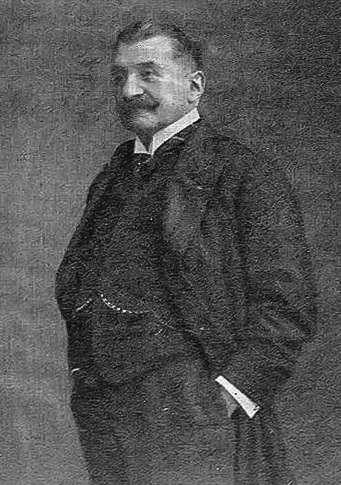

President of the Chamber of Deputies of Luxembourg
- In office 1905–1915

Antoine Marie Auguste Laval-Metz (4 February 1843 – 29 October 1915) was a Luxembourgish politician and industrialist. He sat in the Chamber of Deputies, of which he served as President from 1905 until 1915.

Laval-Metz was first elected to the Chamber in 1878, representing Luxembourg-Campagne. He sat in the Chamber for 12 years until 1890. Initially, Laval was an opponent of Prime Minister Paul Eyschen, who had been a childhood friend, but afterwards became one of Eyschen's strongest supporters. In 1890, Laval left the Chamber, before returning in 1899 for a three-year stint. In 1902, Laval became President of the Bar (French: bâtonnier).

He once again resumed his legislative position in a by-election in 1904, and remained until his death. He was elected President of the Chamber in 1905. His first act was to head the Chamber's deputation to Schloss Hohenburg for the funeral of Grand Duke Adolphe.

Main issues during his tenure as President of the Chamber were of secularism and the creation of schools for girls. On the latter cause in particular, Laval was very involved, and was one of the architects of the creation of girls' schools in Luxembourg City, Diekirch, Echternach, and Esch-sur-Alzette. Laval died office in Bern, on 29 October 1915, having gone to Switzerland to recover from his illness the previous November.

Laval married Marie-Albertine-Petronille-Therese Metz, daughter of Auguste Metz of the politically influential Metz family.

== Decorations ==
- Belgium: Order of the Crown (Grand Cordon)
- Luxembourg:
  - Order of Adolphe of Nassau (Commander)
  - Order of the Oak Crown (Grand Officer)

== Footnotes ==
Political offices
Preceded by Charles-Jean Simons	President of the Chamber of Deputies; 1905–1915	Succeeded by Edouard Hemmer
