= Caspar Mathias Spoo =

Luxembourgish industrialist and politician (1837–1914)

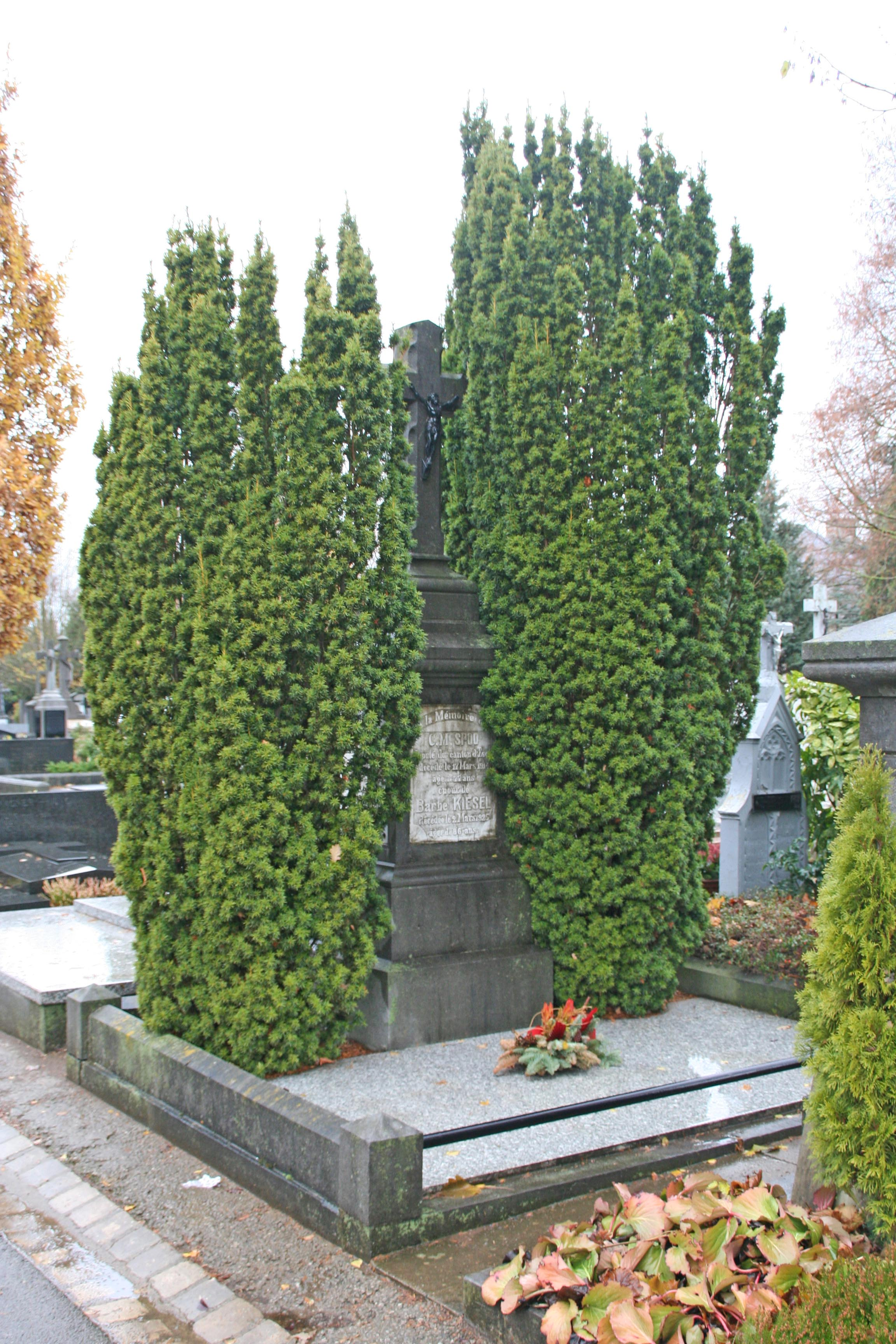
Caspar Mathias Spoo's grave in Esch-sur-Alzette

Caspar Mathias Spoo (7 January 1837 – 17 March 1914) was a Luxembourgish industrialist and politician.

Spoo was born in Echternach in 1837. His parents were workers in the earthenware factory, and died early. He joined the civil service from a young age, to make a living for himself and his siblings. He gave up his position in the postal service in order to open the Société Duchscher Frères et Spoo with André Duchscher, his old friend. From 1886, he worked for two years as an accountant at the Dudelange foundry; he then struck out on his own in 1888 to open an ironmongery in Esch-Alzette with a workshop constructing ovens, cauldrons, etc.: the Maschinenfabrik Spoo & Co.

Additionally, he was politically active. He was elected to the communal council of Esch in 1893 and to the Chamber of Deputies in 1896. Along with Michel Welter, he was one of the first people to engage in modern election campaigning in Luxembourg, by drafting and publishing a manifesto and giving speeches. Politically, he belonged to the left-liberal middle-class. Influenced by André Duchscher, he campaigned for universal suffrage, progressive taxation and social security. He also called for the construction of an industrial school and a secondary school for girls in Esch, and demanded that the canton of Esch, whose economic and demographic importance had increased due to industrialisation, should receive more seats in the Chamber. His social campaigning, in the paternalistic tradition of the 19th century, earned him the nickname "Pappa Spoo".

He was married to Barbe Kiesel, and was the father of Armand Spoo. At his funeral in Esch, Michel Welter gave a eulogy, calling Spoo the "conscience of Luxembourgish socialism."

== Luxembourgish language ==
At his maiden speech in the Chamber on 9 December 1896, Spoo spoke in Luxembourgish, and demanded that Luxembourgish should be allowed in the Chamber. His justification was the following: he argued that Luxembourgish was covered by Article 29 of the Constitution of 1868, which defined the official languages as German and French, and Luxembourgish was, after all, German — and indeed older and more venerable than so-called High German. He described it as one of the richest and healthiest idioms of the Germanic tongue, containing a treasure trove full of valuable language gems and words. The Chamber of Deputies voted on the question, whether Luxembourgish could be spoken in its sessions, and Spoo's proposition was almost unanimously rejected.

Spoo was not the first one to speak Luxembourgish in a Chamber session: on 28 April 1848 in Ettelbrück, while it was being debated if Luxembourg should participate in the Frankfurt Parliament, Karl Mathias André changed in mid-speech from French to Luxembourgish, and received a reply from Norbert Metz in Luxembourgish, as "the public should understand everything." These were the first Luxembourgish words spoken in the Chamber.

When the Education Law of 1912 was being drafted, Spoo demanded that Luxembourgish should be an obligatory subject in primary schools, and was successful. He was supported in this by the prime minister Paul Eyschen, and Nik Welter was tasked with writing the textbook Das Luxemburgische und sein Schrifttum.

Spoo also wrote diverse articles on Michel Lentz and Dicks in Ons Hémecht and the Natio'n, and worked around the country to bring Michel Rodange's satirical epic Rénert the Fox, which had remained obscure until then, to a wider audience.
