= Léon Metz =

Luxembourgish politician and industrialist (1842–1928)

Charles-Léon Metz
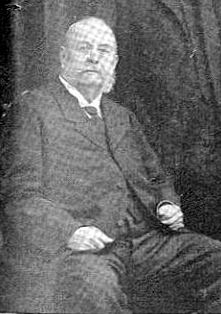
- Cropped picture of Leon Metz, was a Luxembourgish politician and industrialist.

Member of the Chamber of Deputies for Esch-sur-Alzette
- In office 1875–1918

Personal details
- Born: 1 November 1842 Berbourg
- Died: 25 June 1928 (aged 85) Esch-sur-Alzette
- Occupation: Entrepreneur (steel)

Charles-Léon Metz (1 November 1842 – 25 June 1928) was a Luxembourgish politician and industrialist. He was a member of the Chamber of Deputies for forty-three years (1875–1918), and served as Mayor of Esch-sur-Alzette from 1906 to 1909.

The son of Auguste Metz and Petronille Laeis, he was a member of the prominent Metz family, and he entered the family business of metallurgy. He was first elected to the communal council of Esch-sur-Alzette in 1873, and served for four years before becoming an échevin on 16 January 1877. He was also elected to the national Chamber of Deputies as a liberal on 14 October 1875, representing Esch-sur-Alzette. Although a liberal, he was a traditionalist, a practising Catholic, and had close ties to the religious establishment in Esch.

Metz was named Mayor of Esch on 22 October 1906, which was renewed on 28 December 1908. During his tenure as mayor, the most important decision was the commune's purchase of the Forest of Esch, and its replacement with new steel mills, in the district of Belval. Although Metz won re-election in the 1909 communal elections, he decided to resign on 28 November 1909, having served three years as mayor.

Metz lost in his bid to be reelected to the Chamber of Deputies in the 1918 election, and withdrew from public life. He died on 25 June 1928.

== Decorations ==
Metz was awarded a number of decorations:

- Commander, Order of the Oak Crown (Luxembourg)
- Commander, Order of Adolphe of Nassau (Luxembourg)
- Commander, Order of the Crown (Belgium)
- Commander, Order of the Crown (Italy)
- Knight (1st class), Order of the White Falcon (Saxe-Weimar-Eisenach)

== Footnotes ==
Political offices
Preceded by Dominique Joseph Hoferlin	Mayor of Esch-sur-Alzette; 1906–1909	Succeeded by Armand Spoo
