= Luxembourg-Campagne =

Constituency in Luxembourg

Luxembourg-Campagne (English: Luxembourg Rural, German: Luxembourg-Land) was a constituency for elections to the Chamber of Deputies, the national legislature of Luxembourg, until 1919. Until 1919, the constituencies were eleven of the twelve cantons, with the remaining canton of Luxembourg divided into two: Luxembourg-Ville (covering Luxembourg City) and Luxembourg-Campagne. When the city of Hollerich-Bonnevoie was created, it became the seat of the constituency.

Luxembourg voted in partial elections, with cantons' votes staggered, and Luxembourg-Campagne was grouped with Echternach, Esch-sur-Alzette, Mersch, Remich, and Wiltz. The inhabitants of Luxembourg-Campagne elected a number of deputies proportionate to its population. In 1860, this amount was set to three deputies. In 1868, this was increased to five deputies, and this was accomplished with a by-election on 17 December 1868. Another one deputy was added in 1906, to reflect population growth in the outskirts of Luxembourg City.
