= Metz (surname) =

Metz is a German surname. Notable people with the surname include:

- Alexander Metz (born 1987), German rugby union player
- Belinda Metz (born 1960), Canadian vocalist
- Bert Metz (born 1945), Dutch climate policy expert
- Blythe Metz (born 1977), American actress
- Charles Metz (1799–1853), Luxembourgian politician and lawyer
- Charles W. Metz (1889–1975), American geneticist
- Chrissy Metz (born 1980), American actress
- Christian Metz (Inspirationalist) (1794–1867), German-American colonist
- Christian Metz (theorist) (1931–1993), French film theorist
- Danielle De Metz (b. 1938), French actress
- Dick Metz (1908–1993), American golfer
- Don Metz (ice hockey) (1916–2007), Canadian ice hockey player
- Donald J. Metz (1924–1999), American scientist
- Émile Metz (1835–1904), Luxembourgish engineer and politician
- Florian Metz (born 1985), Austrian footballer
- Frederick Metz (1832–1901), German-American founder and brewer
- Gautier de Metz (13th century), French priest and poet
- Gertrud Metz (1746–1793/4), German painter
- Glenn Metz, founder of the Metz Gang drug ring in New Orleans, Louisiana, USA
- Gunther Metz (born 1967), German football coach
- Henry Metz, American pediatric ophthalmologist
- Herman A. Metz (1867–1934), German-American politician and businessman
- Horst Metz (1945-2022), German politician
- Jake Metz (born 1991), American football player
- Jaap Metz (1941–2016), Dutch journalist and politician
- Johann Baptist Metz (1928–2019), German Catholic theologian
- Kimberly Metz, American film director and photographer
- Larry Metz (born 1955), American politician
- Lenny Metz (1899–1953), American baseball player
- Léon Metz (1842–1928), Luxembourgish politician
- Martin Metz (born 1983), German politician
- Melinda Metz (born 1962), American author
- Michael Metz (born 1964), German field hockey player
- Mike Metzger (born 1975), American motocross rider
- Milton Metz (1921–2017), American TV and radio personality
- Nick Metz (1914–1990), Canadian ice hockey player
- Rebecca Metz, American actress
- Sigrid Metz-Göckel (1940–2025), German sociologist, political scientist and social psychologist
- Simon "Schlitzie" Metz (1901–1971), American sideshow freak
- Stefan Metz (born 1951), German ice hockey player
- Steven Metz (born 1956), American professor and author
- Thierry Metz, (1956–1997), French poet
- Thomas F. Metz (born 1948), American army general
- Torri Metz, American obstetrician and high-risk pregnancy researcher
- Trevor Metz (born 1972), Canadian journalist, documentary narrator, radio talk show host, and columnist
- Vittorio Metz (1904–1984), Italian screenwriter and director
- William D. Metz (1914–2013), American historian
- Metz family, a prominent historical political family in Luxembourg, including:
  - Charles Metz (1799–1853)
  - Norbert Metz (1811–1885)
  - Auguste Metz (1812–1854)
  - Léon Metz (1842–1928)

== See also ==
- Arnulf of Metz (c.582–640), Frankish saint
- Clement of Metz, Eastern Orthodox and Roman Catholic saint
- Itta of Metz(592–652), Roman Catholic saint
- Odo of Metz (c.792–805), architect from the Carolingian Empire under Charlemagne
- Motz (surname)
