= Victor Tesch =

Luxembourgish-Belgian jurist, industrialist, journalist and politician (1812–1892)

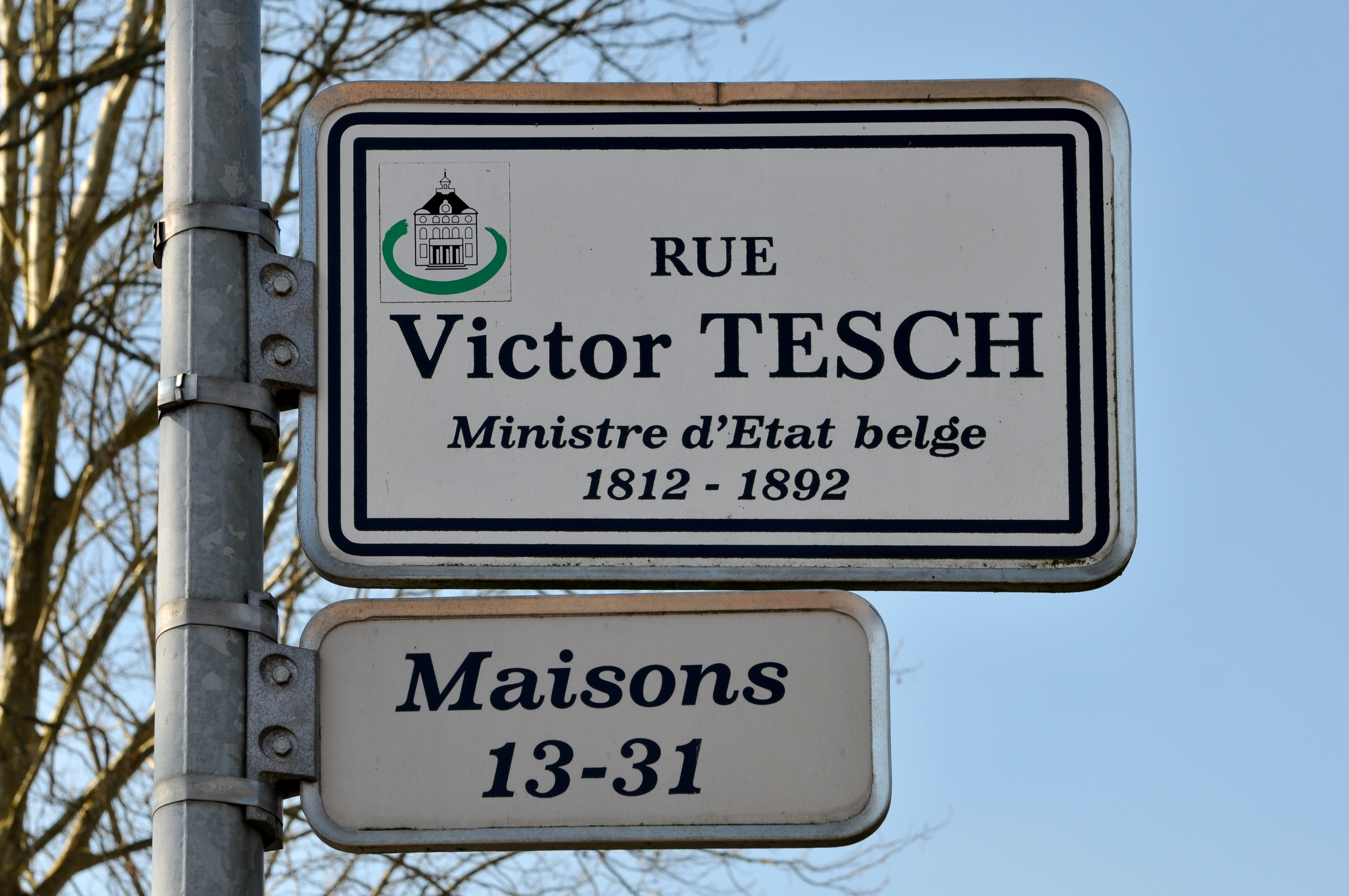
Street sign in Dudelange

Victor Jean-Baptiste Tesch (12 March 1812 – 16 June 1892) was a Luxembourgish and Belgian jurist, industrialist, journalist and liberal politician.

He was born in 1812 in Messancy (then still part of Luxembourg, now part of Belgium), one of nine children of Jean-Frédérich Tesch (1774-1844) and Marie-Cécile Nothomb (1780-1869). He studied law, graduating from the University of Liège in 1832 with a Doctor of law at the age of 20. He settled in Arlon and registered at the bar there. He was a friend of Émile Tandel, the district commissioner for Arlon-Virton, secretary of the Archeological Institute of Luxembourg and author of Communes luxembourgeoises. When he was a councillor of the city of Arlon, Tesch collaborated with Georges Wurth to establish an Athénée there.

He associated with Nicolas Berger, a Luxembourgish banker in Arlon who opted for Belgian citizenship, Emmanuel Servais, later prime minister, and Charles Metz, an industrialist and politician. Tesch was an important figure in the founding of various iron and steel companies that would later become the ARBED steel group.

In 1856 Berger had the idea of linking the collieries of the Saar and the iron ore mines of Luxembourg to establish an iron foundry in Saarbrücken. Tesch was enthusiastic, and joined in the venture, soon becoming its president. The works was established in Burbach.

The Ostend-Arlon railway line was opened in 1858, and connected to the Luxembourgish network in 1859, then to the Saar. The Longwy branch, via Messancy, was operational from 1860. This linked the industrial sites of the two Luxembourgs, Lorraine and the Saar, to the benefit of industry.

In 1862, a new company merged the foundries of Burbach with the enterprise of Auguste Metz in Eich. Later, Tesch and Norbert Metz established works in Dudelange, opened in 1886. Tesch was active throughout his whole life in finance and industry, sitting on the boards of directors of 38 companies: 10 collieries, 4 real estate companies, 13 railway companies, 4 metal-working companies and 5 banks. His impact on the economic development of the south of Luxembourg was therefore significant.

Highly attached to his native region, Tesch was vehemently against the partition that would split off the Grand Duchy from the Province of Luxembourg. He was active in politics, and founded a liberal newspaper alongside Emmanuel Servais, Charles Metz and Auguste Wurth, the Écho du Luxembourg, which first appeared in 1836. Tesch thereby opposed his cousin, Jean-Baptiste Nothomb, who was in favour of the partition. After 1839, Tesch, like Auguste Wurth, chose Belgian nationality. From 1837 he was in the city council of Arlon, and from 1838 to 1848 also sat in the provincial council.

Tesch was the Belgian minister of justice from 1850 to 1852 and from 1857 to 1865. In 1855 he was asked by Leopold II to form a new government, but refused.

In 1866 Tesch built the cháteau "Le Castel" in Messancy.

By marrying his cousin, Hélène-Cécile-Caroline Nothomb, he married into the respected Nothomb family. They had three daughters, and all three of Tesch's sons-in-law would become founding members of ARBED:

- Léonie Wilhelmina Tesch: married Léon Barbanson (1843-1912)
- Cécile Henriette Tesch: married Hubert Müller (d. 1917), director of the steelworks in Esch-Alzette, co-founder of ARBED
- Edmée Tesch: married Émile Metz (1835-1904), foundry owner at Dudelange
