= Foreign internal defense =

Approach to combating actual or threatened insurgency

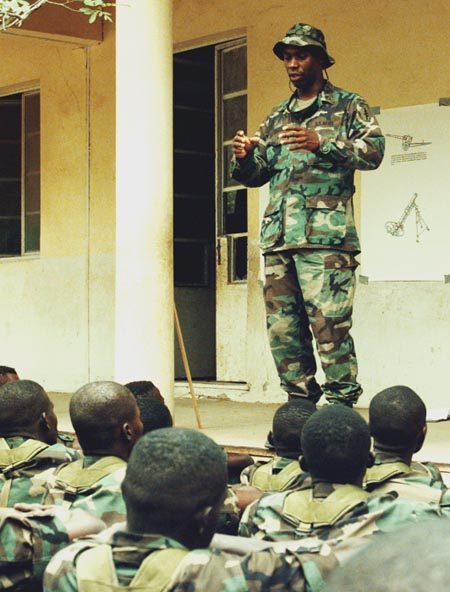
American soldier instructs Senegalese soldiers on peacekeeping tactics and initiatives.

Foreign internal defense (FID) is a term used by the military in several countries, including the United States, France and the United Kingdom, to describe an integrated or multi-country approach to combating actual or threatened insurgency in a foreign state. This foreign state is known as the Host Nation (HN) under the US (and generally accepted NATO) doctrine. The term counter-insurgency is commonly used for FID.

FID involves military deployment of counter-insurgency specialists. According to the US doctrinal manual, Joint Publication 3-22: Foreign Internal Defense (FID), these specialists occasionally get involved with the actual fighting. This doctrine calls for a close working relationship between the Host Nation government and security specialists, which could include diplomatic, information, intelligence, military, economic, and other specialties. A successful FID action is one that leads to the suppression of actual violence. If combat operations are required, Host Nation security forces take the lead. FID is tasked with external support and training where required.

== Definition ==
Formally, FID is defined as "Participation by civilian and military agencies of a government in any of the action programs taken by another government or other designated organization to free and protect its society from subversion, lawlessness, and insurgency."

=== Instruments of national power ===
FID is a multinational and interagency effort that requires the integration and synchronization of many different factions of national power.

The joint forces that make up the FID effort, support other instruments of national power as well,(diplomatic, information/intelligence, economic, etc.) to protect and enhance Host Nation security interests. These actions may include:

- Military engagement,
- Security cooperation (SC), and
- Deterrence

=== Internal defense and development (IDAD) program ===
The FM 3-24 Counterinsurgency, defines counterinsurgency as:

Insurgency and its tactics are as old as warfare itself. Joint doctrine defines an insurgency as an organized movement aimed at the overthrow of a constituted government through the use of subversion and armed conflict. Stated another way, an insurgency is an organized, protracted politico-military struggle designed to weaken the control and legitimacy of an established government, occupying power, or other political authority while increasing insurgent control. Counterinsurgency is military, paramilitary, political, economic, psychological, and civic actions taken by a government to defeat insurgency. These definitions are a good starting point, but they do not properly highlight a key paradox: though insurgency and COIN are two sides of a phenomenon that has been called revolutionary war or internal war, they are distinctly different types of operations. In addition, insurgency and COIN are included within a broad category of conflict known as irregular warfare. [italics in original]

In many respects, it is the mirror image of the US doctrine for guerrilla warfare, which in US Special Operations is called unconventional warfare:

Military and paramilitary operations, normally of long duration, predominantly conducted by indigenous or surrogate forces who are organized, trained, equipped, supported, and directed in varying degrees by an external source. It includes guerrilla warfare and other direct offensive, low visibility, covert, or clandestine operations, as well as the indirect activities of subversion, sabotage, intelligence gathering, and escape and evasion When American advisors were sent to Laos and South Vietnam in the early sixties, the major problem was not to create guerrilla units but to fight existing Laotian and Vietnamese guerrilla forces. It seemed logical that soldiers trained to be guerrillas would have a deep understanding of how to fight guerrillas, so Special Forces was given that mission. The White Star mission in Laos was initially covert and used Special Forces and other personnel under Central Intelligence Agency control. Whether the mission is called counterguerilla, counterinsurgency, or foreign internal defense, it involves assisting a friendly government—the "foreign" in FID—to defend against guerrillas acting inside its borders. FID can also involve training a foreign government to deal with a future internal guerrilla threat. Note well the use of "external source" above. Foreign internal defense may also involve defense against infiltrators, or even conventional military forces, crossing national borders. FID, however, is focused primarily on situations when major conflicts will take place inside the national borders. Unconventional warfare has historically been used in one of two ways:

- To support or shape the environment for the larger conventional campaign, such as WWII Resistance operations conducted before the Normandy invasion
- unilateral effort, generally conducted covertly, includes Afghanistan against the Soviets in the 1980s, and again in Afghanistan after the attacks of September 11, 2001.

== Effective FID and partnership ==
FID exists only within a context of host nation (HN) internal defense and development (IDAD), where it can be a force multiplier for regional commanders concerned with counterinsurgency. Insurgencies today are more likely to be transnational than in the past.

Political power is the central issue in insurgencies and counterinsurgencies; each side aims to get the people to accept its governance or authority as legitimate. Insurgents use all available tools—political (including diplomatic), informational (including appeals to religious, ethnic, or ideological beliefs), military, and economic—to overthrow the existing authority. This authority may be an established government or an interim governing body. Counterinsurgents, in turn, use all instruments of national power to sustain the established or emerging government and reduce the likelihood of another crisis emerging.

It has been a basic axiom that successful FID programs are real partnerships. According to Cordesman, a set of rules for establishing such partnerships include:

1. Real security dialogue at the bilateral and regional level means listening and last personal relationships.
2. Security cooperation should focus on security and stability, not political or social reform. Such efforts should recognize the legitimacy of different values and be the subject of a separate dialogue.
3. Build trust by clearly seeking friend or ally's security.
4. Focus on building local self-defense and deterrence capabilities, not presence or dependence.
5. Help friends and allies build forces in their own way; do not "mirror image."
6. Recognize the reality that other nations define threats and allies differently from the U.S.
7. Arms sales must clearly benefit the buyer, not just the seller.
8. Ensure sustainability, capability to operate own forces in own way.
9. Responsive, time sensitive aid, deployment, sales, and transfers.

Especially when the HN government, the insurgency, and the FID force come from different cultures, careful thought needs to be given both to the way the parties perceive the rules, and the ways they communicate their agreement to one another. Steven Metz, of the US Army Strategic Studies Institute, warns that the paradigm may have changed. He rejects the idea that transnational terrorism is uniquely Islamic.

== Participants in FID programs ==
No external force can guarantee success against an insurgency unless the people regard the Host Nation (HN) government as legitimate. Limited external support helped Ramon Magsaysay defeat the Hukbalahap insurgency in the Philippines, with one of the most important parts of that support being the availability of air transport so he could be visible in remote areas. The Vietnam War showed that even a superpower cannot make an unresponsive and corrupt government succeed against insurgents, especially when the superpower has significant conflict in its internal decisionmaking.

The very conditions that may necessitate a stability operation or support operation—widespread human suffering, population movements, famine, human rights violations, and civil war—are also the conditions that attract the services of nongovernmental organizations (NGO) and private voluntary organizations (PVO). A PVO is a subset of NGO, and is a tax-exempt nonprofit that leverages expertise and private funding to address development challenges abroad.

For example, recent multinational operations involving US forces have at times included representatives from nations unable to fully support their deployed forces. Calls by coalition members for US support have in other instances been due less to an inability to provide assistance than to a desire to take advantage of superior US capabilities (e.g., medical care). Urban operations put coalition forces in closer proximity to each other. The number of such requests is therefore likely to be greater during such contingencies. Operational readiness or coalition politics may dictate that they be granted despite the resultant burden on US CSS units. US Marine Corps forces found themselves providing various types of assistance to members of the media during their 2002 operations in and around Kandahar, Afghanistan. Already tasked with requirements beyond those initially expected, scarce resources were further stretched by having to support fifty members of these various commercial organizations.

=== Military ===
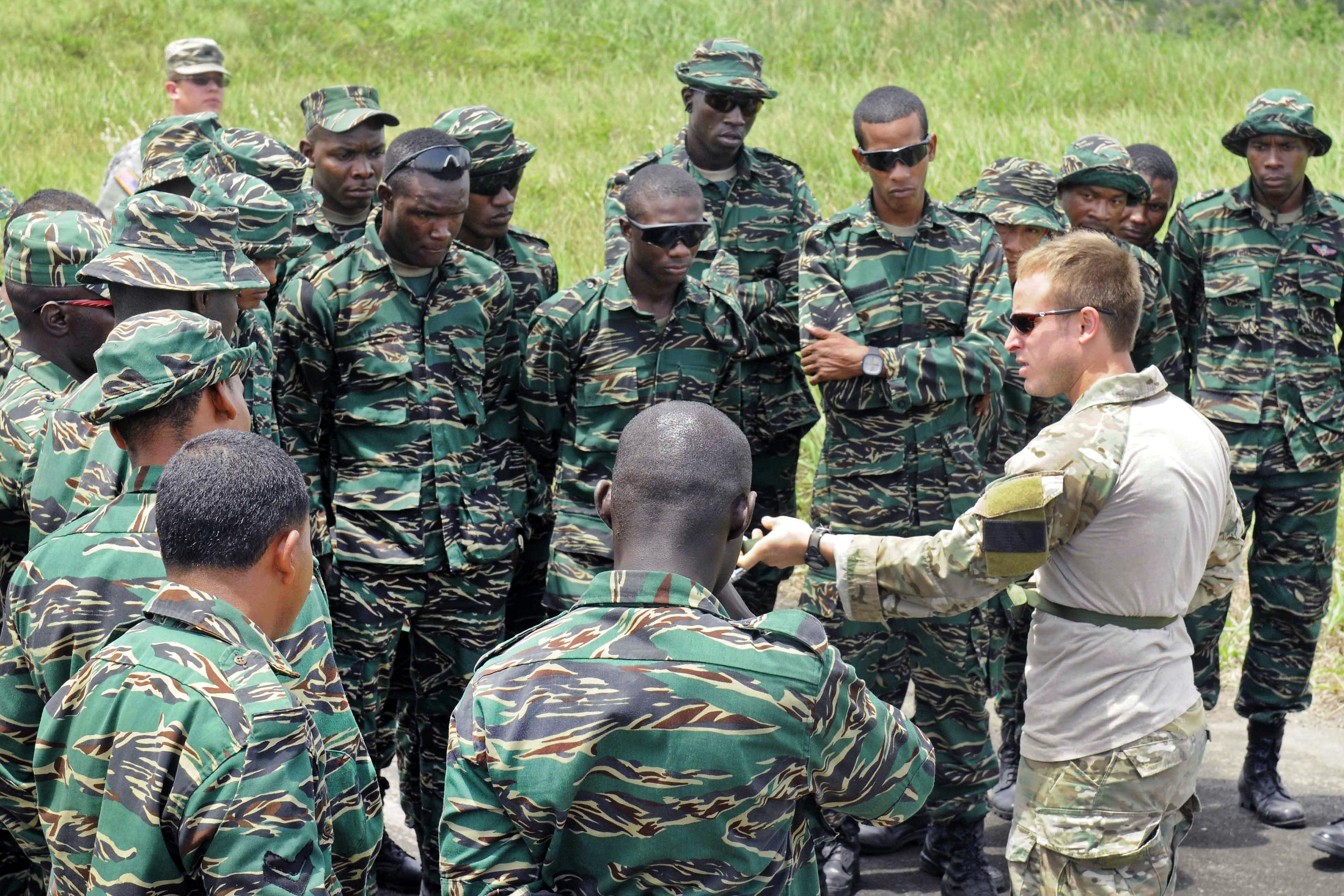
U.S. Army Special Forces soldier instructing Guyana Defence Force soldiers on air assault techniques.

Western special operations forces are considered strategic assets with core missions including FID and UW. They may have other capabilities relevant to specific situations, such as demining. The United States Army Special Forces are among the most versatile organizations, but not all their capabilities may be needed for a specific FID situation. For example, the most urgent need might be for public health specialists or airfield construction crews, which operate on a level far beyond the medical or engineering specialists of a US Special Forces unit. Public health or construction organizations, however, have limited or no self-defense capability and will need protection in insecure areas.

== FID models ==
=== Myths and fallacies ===
The term Global War on Terror has been criticized, but there may be utility in examining a war not specifically on the tactic of terror, but in one or more, potentially cooperating insurgencies. "The utility of analyzing the war on terrorism using an insurgency/counterinsurgency conceptual framework. Additionally, the recommendations can be applied to the strategic campaign, even if it is politically unfeasible to address the war as an insurgency." Cordesman points out some of the myths in trying to have a worldwide view of terror:

- Cooperation can be based on trust and common values: One man's terrorist is another man's terrorist.
- A definition of terrorism exists that can be accepted by all.
- Intelligence can be freely shared.
- Other states can be counted on to keep information secure, and use it to mutual advantage.
- International institutions are secure and trustworthy.
- Internal instability and security issues do not require compartmentation and secrecy at national level.
- The "war on terrorism" creates common priorities and needs for action.
- Global and regional cooperation is the natural basis for international action.
- Legal systems are compatible enough for cooperation.
- Human rights and rule of law differences do not limit cooperation.
- Most needs are identical.
- Cooperation can be separated from financial needs and resources.

Social scientists, soldiers, and sources of change have been modeling insurgency for nearly a century, if one starts with Mao.

=== Kilcullen's "Three Pillars" ===
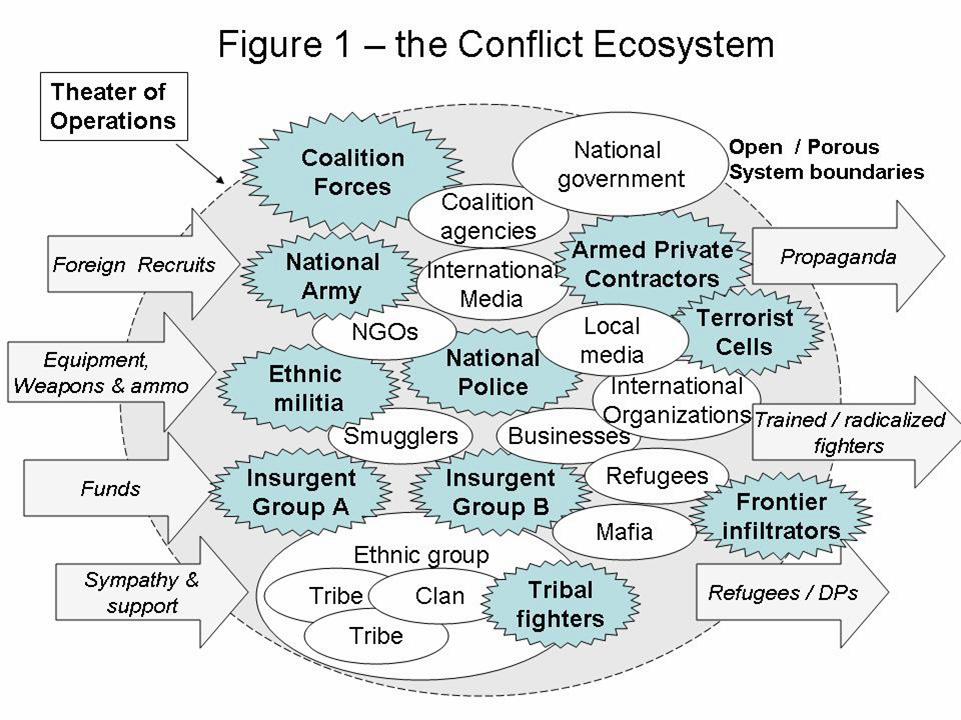
Kilcullen Figure 1: Ecosystem of Insurgency

Kilcullen gives a useful visual overview of an insurgency and counterinsurgency of the actors in the models. Inside the box are governments, counterinsurgent forces, insurgent leaders, insurgent forces, and the general population, which is made up of three groups:

1. those committed to the insurgents
2. those committed to the counterinsurgents
3. those who simply wish to get on with their lives.

Kilcullen's Three Pillars

The three pillar model repeats later as part of the gaps to be closed to end an insurgency. "Obviously enough, you cannot command what you do not control. Therefore, unity of command (between agencies or among government and non-government actors) means little in this environment." Unity of command is one of the axioms of military doctrine change with the use of swarming:.

In Edwards swarming model, as in Kilcullen's mode, unity of command becomes "unity of effort at best, and collaboration or deconfliction at least."

=== McCormick's "Magic Diamond" ===
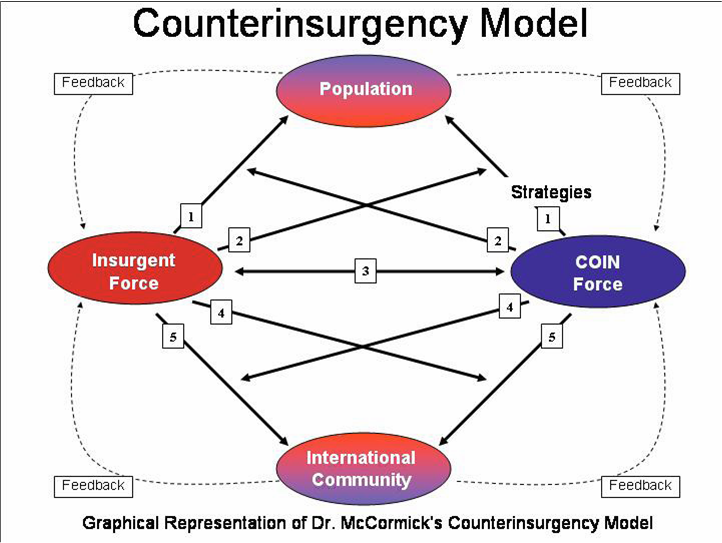
McCormick insurgency model

McCormick's "Magic Diamond" model depicts four key elements or players:

1. Insurgent force
2. Counterinsurgency force (i.e., the government)
3. Population
4. International community

=== Barnett's "connecting to the core" ===
In Thomas Barnett's paradigm, the world is divided into a "connected core" of nations enjoying a high level of communications among their organizations and individuals, and those nations that are disconnected internally and externally. In a reasonably peaceful situation, he describes a "system administrator" force, often multinational, which does what some call "nation-building", but, most importantly, connects the nation to the core and empowers the natives to communicate—that communication can be likened to swarm coordination. If the state is occupied, or in civil war, another paradigm comes into play, which is generally beyond the scope of FID: the leviathan, a first-world military force that takes down the opposition regular forces. Leviathan is not constituted to fight local insurgencies, but major forces. Leviathan may use extensive swarming at the tactical level, but its dispatch is a strategic decision that may be made unilaterally, or by an established group of the core such as NATO or ASEAN.

=== Eizenstat and closing gaps ===
Stuart E. Eizenstat gives a broad view of FID involve closing "gaps", some of which can be done by military advisors and even combat assistance, but, even more broadly, helping the Host Nation (HN) be seen as responsive. To be viable, a state must be able to close three "gaps", of which the first is most important:

- Security: Protection "against internal and external threats, and preserving sovereignty over territory. If a government cannot ensure security, rebellious armed groups or criminal nonstate actors may use violence to exploit this security gap—as in Haiti, Nepal, and Somalia."
- Capacity: The most basic are the survival needs of water, electrical power, food and public health, closely followed by education, communications and a working economic system. "An inability to do so creates a capacity gap, which can lead to a loss of public confidence and then perhaps political upheaval. In most environments, a capacity gap coexists with—or even grows out of—a security gap. In Afghanistan and the Democratic Republic of the Congo, for example, segments of the population are cut off from their governments because of endemic insecurity. And in postconflict Iraq, critical capacity gaps exist despite the country's relative wealth and strategic importance."
- Legitimacy: Closing the legitimacy gap is more than an incantation of "democracy" and "elections", but a government that is perceived to exist by the consent of the governed, has minimal corruption, and has a working law enforcement and judicial system that enforces human rights.

Note the similarity between Eizenstat's gaps and Kilcullen's three pillars.

=== Cordesman and security ===
Anthony Cordesman notes that security requirements differ by region and state in region. Writing on the Middle East, he identified different security needs for specific areas, as well as the US interest in security in those areas.

- In North Africa, the US focus should be on security cooperation in achieving regional stability and in counterterrorism.
- In the Levant, the US must largely compartment security cooperation with Israel and cooperation with friendly Arab states like Egypt, Jordan, and Lebanon, but can improve security cooperation with all these states.
- In the Gulf, the US must deal with the strategic importance of a region whose petroleum and growing gas exports fuel key elements of the global economy.

The French general, Joseph Gallieni, observed, while a colonial administrator in 1898,

A country is not conquered and pacified when a military operation has decimated its inhabitants and made all heads bow in terror; the ferments of revolt will germinate in the mass and the rancours accumulated by the brutal action of force will make them grow again

Both Kilcullen and Eizenstat define a more abstract goal than does Cordesman. Kilcullen's security pillar is roughly equivalent to Eizenstat's security gap:

- Military security (securing the population from attack or intimidation by guerrillas, bandits, terrorists or other armed groups)
- Police security (community policing, police intelligence or "Special Branch" activities, and paramilitary police field forces).
- Human security, building a framework of human rights, civil institutions and individual protections, public safety (fire, ambulance, sanitation, civil defense) and population security.

This pillar most engages military commanders' attention, but of course military means are applied across the model, not just in the security domain, while civilian activity is critically important in the security pillar also ... all three pillars must develop in parallel and stay in balance, while being firmly based in an effective information campaign.

Anthony Cordesman, while speaking of the specific situation in Iraq, makes some points that can be generalized to other nations in turmoil. Cordesman recognizes some value in the groupings in Samuel P. Huntington's idea of the clash of civilizations, but, rather assuming the civilizations must clash, these civilizations simply can be recognized as actors in a multinational world. In the case of Iraq, Cordesman observes that the burden is on the Islamic civilization, not unilaterally the West, if for no other reason that the civilization to which the problematic nation belongs will have cultural and linguistic context that Western civilization cannot hope to equal.

== National problems and transnational spillover ==
Developed and stable countries have their own reasons for helping HNs deal with insurgency, because insurgencies can have direct (e.g., terrorism, epidemic disease) or indirect (e.g., drug trade, economic instability in resources) effects on them. While ideological or religious terrorism is most frequently mentioned, it is, by no means, the only multinational problem that FID addresses, starting at the national level. When one of these problems is present in a state, it is likely to cause transnational "spillover effects".

Not only HN, but regional conflicts threaten to widen gaps. "Pretending that the conflicts in Afghanistan, Chechnya, Darfur, Iraq, Palestine and Sri Lanka are the problems of others or are going to solve themselves is not a solution. Some states, especially in the ASEAN group, can be quite strong, but still have difficulties with piracy, terrorism, and drug traffic. There are a number of intelligence-sharing arrangements among countries in this area and the US FID assistance needs can involve economically strong countries in other regions. "Nigeria is among the top ten exporters of crude oil to the United States. ... when rebel leaders in the oil-rich Niger delta vowed to launch an "all-out war on the Nigerian state," instability helped propel global oil prices to more than $50 per barrel.

=== Blood diamonds ===
Transnational criminal networks may use weak nations as sanctuaries for high-value, low-volume commodities such as diamonds.

=== Illicit drug trade ===
Drugs also are high-value and low-volume. When a country's legitimate government is weak compared to its drug trade infrastructure, part of FID may be defeating that infrastructure, or, minimally, reducing its ability to corrupt or destroy government institutions.

Consistent with the restrictions on military organizations performing civilian law enforcement, such as the US Posse Comitatus Act, homeland and FID personnel can cooperate with partner nations (PN) in their counterdrug (CD) effort to disrupt the transport and/or transfer of illegal drugs into the US. Counterdrug (CD) is a high priority national security and international cooperation mission, with DOD functions and responsibilities based on statutory authority. The Armed Forces of the United States assist partner nations (PNs) in their CD efforts. Illicit drug trafficking, smuggling of every sort, and the regional and global movement of terrorists are closely linked by financial, political, and operational linkages.

US military resources can be used as part of a counter-drug (CD) component of a FID program. While these are most often focused on supply, they also can be used to interfere with drug shipment. Since the United States Department of Defense is the lead government agency of the USG for the detection and monitoring (DM) of aerial and maritime transit of illegal drugs into the US, the DM mission is performed with regularly appropriated funds, notwithstanding the possibility of incidental benefit to the HN. Such activities may include nonconfrontational intercepts for intelligence or communication purposes and gathering and processing of tactical intelligence from a variety of sources, including fixed and mobile surveillance assets and certain intelligence sharing.

=== Piracy ===
Piracy is very real in the international waters of weak and failed states, such as Somalia. FID personnel may gather intelligence on pirate locations, and transmit this to warships able to intercept the pirate vessels.

Piracy also may feed into security violations at ports, and as a means by which terrorists transport personnel and materials. An Organisation for Economic Co-operation and Development (OECD) study on the ownership and control of ships reports that anonymous ownership is more the rule than the exception. There are reports that 15 cargo ships are linked to al-Qaeda.

=== Disease ===
Bad health is a very real problem, especially from domestic conflict that displaces refugees across borders. HIV is the most obvious, especially in Africa, but it is not the only major concern.

Military health specialists, as distinct from special operations forces, can have an enormous impact. As one example, the US Navy's Medical Research Unit No. 3 has been active in Egypt since the Second World War.

=== Terrorism ===
Motivating states against global terrorist groups is, in the US, principally the responsibility of the Department of State. Effective FID programs, however, can improve public perceptions of both the HN and the country(ies) providing FID resources. and facilitate more active HN policies to combat terrorism. Military-to-military contacts can help make HN officials advocates of potential operations against terrorist capabilities.

In many cases, measures increasing the capacity of a state to fight terrorism also will strengthen its overall IDAD program. These measures can include the following:

- Training personnel at entry and exit points (including airports, seaports, and border crossings) to identify and apprehend individuals and materials being used by international terrorist groups.
- Developing effective judicial systems, and minimizing corruption and intimidation of HN officials.

== Nonmilitary actions in closing gaps ==
While the usual focus is on the military component of FID, the US FID joint doctrinal manual makes it clear that FID must be coordinated with all parts of a host government's scope. Doctrinally, the overall program should be under the United States Department of State, or equivalent Foreign Ministry for other countries' FID programs. In the sixties a presidentially appointed ambassador, otherwise known as chief of mission (COM), heads the embassy.

Every authority on counterinsurgency emphasizes the need for unity of command in the threatened area and emphasizes the primacy of political planning over military. But for various reasons having to do with US intragovernmental rivalry, US policy perpetuates competing lines of command and competition between military and political leaders in insurgency and preinsurgency theaters. In Iraq, Multinational Force Iraq reports to United States Central Command, not the Ambassador. Much must be done to rebuild the Department of State's capacity to reestablish balanced country teams and strong COMs in threatened areas. A strategic shift of this magnitude will not happen overnight. ... A whole rethinking of embassy staffing and of professional development for Foreign Service officers must begin; the good news is that State is awake to the challenges and is addressing the problems, though with mixed success to date.

=== Economic ===
Not all models consider economics a key gap. The World Bank observes, however, that "low-income countries are about 15 times more susceptible to internal conflict than countries in the Organisation for Economic Co-operation and Development (OECD).

"The governments of major developing countries must play a large part in designing and carrying out new strategies. For proof, one need only look at the radically different international responses to the locally initiated New Partnership for Africa's Development (NEPAD) (which was embraced) and the Bush administration's Greater Middle East Initiative (which was not)."

==== Debt relief ====
Especially poor nations are under a crushing debt load, and international organizations such as the World Bank and International Monetary Fund have worked on debt relief, within a well-managed economic framework, to allow those countries to reallocate funds from debt service to development activities.

==== Development ====
All these components need to be tailored to the HN capacity to absorb spending, as well as efforts to increase absorptive capacity, underpin other development activities. "One of the fundamental reasons for the US military's success in reacting to emergencies is its almost limitless supply of contingency funding. US development agencies have no comparable capacity. Congress should give the president a "country-in-transition" fund to finance unforeseen reconstruction or peacekeeping operations ... [the world needs] cohesive rapid response unit, a centralized pool of interagency experts on state building—the rule of law, governance, and economic reform—trained to work together and able to deploy rapidly, unencumbered by bureaucratic inertia, to crisis spots." Language and cultural knowledge gaps alone mean that this cannot be a unilateral US operation.

==== Military assistance ====
Economic support can include the provision of foreign military financing under security assistance.

=== Health ===
Additional deployment of health services have, historically, proven to be a valuable low-risk asset to support FID programs.

When mass immunization programs are part of the health services in FID, it can be wise to avoid extreme measures to keep insurgents from receiving immunization.

For countries that have had long civil wars or other conflicts that left a legacy of land mines, prosthetic services, regretfully, may be necessary—and leave long-term friendships.

==== Agriculture and nutrition ====
A lesson learned by accident came from the Marine Combined Action Platoons in Vietnam, where young Marines who came from 4-H Club farm competition turned out to be experts on animal husbandry. In some FID situations, there can be an enormous benefit, both for health through proper diet and for economic development, to bring in experts on sustainable agriculture, and resources that the local inhabitants can use independently, such as improved breeding stock.

== FID operations ==
A representative set of steps for the FID force is:

1. Security Operations – "The first priority for any government facing an insurgency is to establish a secure environment." The FID force role will vary here. The HN government has the greatest credibility when it can conduct these operations, respecting human rights, on its own.
2. Gain Popular Support – "Gaining and maintaining the support of the population is the overall goal and path to victory since the population is the center of gravity, therefore it is imperative for long-term success that the population views the government as legitimate. It is equally important for the US effort to be viewed as legitimate versus being viewed as an occupier or supporting a puppet government."
3. Gain International Support – "It is also important for the government's internal defense efforts to be legitimized, accepted and supported by the international community." The more the military and nonmilitary FID organization is multinational, the easier it may be to gain this support.
4. Defeat Insurgents – "If done correctly, the first three lines should de-legitimize the insurgents and lead to their lasting defeat. This line will attack the hard-core insurgents. Some may succumb to offers of amnesty, but most will need to be killed or captured through offensive operations." Again, it is most desirable HN personnel do this.
5. Develop Host Nation Internal Security – Internal security forces, such as local and national police forces, key facility protection corps, diplomat security personnel, coast guard, criminal investigation, paramilitary forces for counterinsurgency, local and national level special weapons and tactics capabilities will be necessary to defeat the internal threat as a law enforcement matter." If coalition combat forces have been used, "as the internal security forces are trained, the coalition will transition to only protecting the nation from external threats until such a time as the actual national military force is trained, equipped, and can conduct unilateral operations."

The end state is a legitimate government that the population trusts and is able to detect and defeat internal and external threats.

In both the city and country, HN troops will be closer allies if they have the same protection and undergo the same risks as the FID troops. This can present difficulties when FID personnel are forbidden from combat operations, but there is a very delicate line between live-fire training and combat.

=== Planning staff ===
Mission creep can develop in different ways, with the inappropriate planning coming from outside or inside the FID units.

With the best of intentions, a unit may take on more than is allowed in the current mandate and mission. "An example would be if a commander directed execution of civil action projects that fall outside his authority. Rebuilding structures, training local nationals, and other activities may be good for the local population, but they may be beyond the mandate and mission. At the same time, FID and HN commanders need to recognize when they lack critical resources, or if their rules of engagement are inadequate for a rapidly developing situation. When the on-scene UN commander in Rwanda, Gen. Romeo Dallaire asked UN headquarters for freedom to act, it was denied due to the interpretation of UN resolutions. Hindsight is always easy, but the catastrophe that took place might have been averted had Dallaire been able to carry out certain actions, including disabling or destroying of broadcast facilities used for inflammatory propaganda, as was done early in Bosnia.

=== Legitimacy and government ===
In the gap model, closing the legitimacy gap provides a framework for constructive HN activity. Kilcullen calls this gap the political pillar.

==== Disarming, demobilization and reintegration: end state ====
Like the security pillar for military forces, the political pillar is the principal arena for diplomatic and civil governance assistance efforts — although, again, civil agencies play a significant role in the security and economic pillars also.

Transparency—in a developing government's decision-making, its allocation of budgetary funds, and its administration of the rule of law—must also be promoted.

==== Limits to intervention ====
This section bears the title of Townsend Hoopes' best-known book.

As a group they were progressive moderates, categorically opposed to terrorism. At the same time, they were openly critical of current U.S. foreign policy, especially in the Middle East, believing it plays into the hands of Islamic extremists. The Bush doctrine seems to them overmilitarized, insensitive to historic realities and to genuine grievances in the region. The gravest crisis in the world today turns on the question of how to prevent a destructive confrontation between the West and the whole of Islam. If there is an answer, it lies in persuading the great majority of Muslims (totaling some 2 billion people) to choose modernity and moderation, and to reject the blind alley offered by its nihilist minority. In this context, a $200,000 State Department program aimed at explaining the basic tenets and promises of American democracy to future leaders of South Asia looks more cost effective than a $400 billion defense budget.

==== Legitimacy is culturally defined ====
Neither isolation nor indulgence alone can meaningfully affect an elite's stance. While its long-term effect has yet to be determined, Afghans for a Civil Society demonstrates some potentially relevant principles.

Cordesman uses much the same argument as Eizenstat's legitimacy gap by saying "Algeria, Egypt, and Syria have already shown that "long wars" fought on this basis may bring the threat under partial control but cannot defeat it. If the US has pushed too hard, too quickly, and sometimes for the wrong thing, the Islamic leader that tries to defeat Islamic extremism by blocking or delaying reform, or making concessions to Islamic extremism, is guilty of committing self-inflicted wounds to his own faith and country—a failure far worse than any failure by Western states."

When a society suffers terrorism, it needs to recognize its own responsibilities, rather than shifting blame to outside groups. In no way does this absolve groups from committing acts of terror, but the FID paradigm recognizes that completed acts of terrorism widen the security gap; the Marxist guerrilla theoretician Carlos Marighella specifically aimed at the security gap. FID is intended both to assist the HN in developing direct measures to prevent and mitigate acts, but it also recognizes that the HN needs to carry out information operations that show the acts to be contrary to the general interests of the population. "To be credible in such messages, the HN government, as well as other policy influencers such as clerics, educators, politicians and media, need to condemn the acts while recognizing grievances ... They ultimately will be more important than internal security forces and counterterrorism campaigns.

Even though Barnett speaks of problem nations as disconnected from the core, even failed states have some access to electronic communications, which means that the HN needs to respond quickly to the messages and claims of responsibility issues with attacks ..."Steady progress towards meeting popular needs and goals is equally important. Such progress may often be slow, and change will normally have to be evolutionary. But it must be a constant and publicly credible pursuit that leaders are seen to push forward. Extremists have capitalized on the dissatisfaction on the "street" with their economic, political, and economic situation—the steady decay of public services, corruption, and the narrow distribution of income.

Terrorism can never be eliminated as a tactic, but the ideology that drives organizations like Al-Qa'ida can be discredited and isolated. Support for extremism is still extremely marginal in weak nations. Terrorists killing innocent civilians have tarred the image of their broader civilization, and have destroyed the livelihood of nations like Iraq and Afghanistan. Poll after poll has shown that people in the Muslim worlds want moderate alternatives to the status quo, if their political, religious, and intellectual leaders will actually provide them." It is no accident that groups such as Hezbollah provide social services, with a message that the HN government cannot.

==== Role of counterterrorism ====
One of the challenges to a government intending to be seen as legitimate is the extent to which it can use what is often counterterror: selective assassination. This is not a black-and-white choice, as in the WWII examples of Reinhard Heydrich and Isoroku Yamamoto. Both were uniformed and identifiable, but Yamamoto was a member of the military while Heydrich was a government official. Lynn asks, "In a struggle for legitimacy founded on justice, can a government execute its opponents without trial? That was what assassination of insurgent leaders amounted to in El Salvador and Vietnam."

In a counterinsurgency situation, the perception of the government (i.e., McCormick's CF) violating the human rights of the population causes Eisenstat's legitimacy gap to widen. The Phoenix program in South Vietnam was criticized for a lack of precision in its targeting, and caused a further loss in legitimacy of the government, regardless of the damage done to the Viet Cong infrastructure. Marighella recommended that urban guerillas deliberately provoke the government into overreaction, as a means of reducing its legitimacy; the doctrine of having FID trainers counsel respect for human rights has pure military, not just humanitarian, justification.

With strong intelligence, there may be a justification for targeted killing of clearly identified leaders and key specialists. When governments go farther into terror and torture, however, experience has shown that its effect rebounds both on their legitimacy and onto their personnel.

== Indirect military support operations ==
Indirect support operations emphasize the principle of HN self-sufficiency. "Indirect support focuses on building strong national infrastructures through economic and military capabilities that contribute to self-sufficiency. FID personnel contribute to indirect support through security cooperation guidance, delivering through security assistance (SA), supplemented by multinational exercises, exchange programs, and selected joint exercises.

=== Troop equipping and training ===
Those who deliver training must exemplify both military skills and cultural sensitivity. While one's own country might consider searching after-action reviews a recognized learning experience, such techniques are counterproductive in countries where even one-on-one direct criticism is insulting, and even more so if criticism is delivered in front of third parties. Especially in intelligence and psychological operations, the FID and HN personnel should recognize they can learn from one another.

=== Logistics ===
In the absence of specific enabling legislation or orders, logistic support operations are limited by US law and usually consist of transportation or limited maintenance support.

There can be times, however, where the country or countries providing FID resources can make an enormous difference at a key time, as, for example, with heavy airlift or sealift. For example, while US troops are not on the ground in Darfur, African Union peacekeepers are being flown from Kigali, Rwanda and Abuja, Nigeria by US transport aircraft.

=== Information operations ===
A very effective leaflet during Operation Desert Storm was distasteful and even offensive to many Americans, because they showed men walking while holding hands. "The Arabs loved them as they showed the solidarity of the soldiers, hand in hand." To have Arab men hold hands symbolizes friendship, not any sexual message that Americans perceived.

For propaganda used in FID, there are multiple audiences, often with different perspectives. The wrong leaflet or broadcast sent to the wrong group can be counterproductive. In US FID doctrine, targets are identified as:

1. Insurgents – "Create dissension, disorganization, low morale, subversion, and defection within insurgent forces, as well as help discredit them." A leaflet intended to strengthen the resolve of HN military forces might be perceived as demonstrating weakness of the latter vis-a-vis the insurgents.
2. Civilian populace – "Gain, preserve, and strengthen civilian support for the HN government and its counterinsurgency programs." Too strong a military emphasis, regarding actions of either side, can be frightening.
3. Military forces – Strengthen military support, with emphasis on building and maintaining the morale of the HN forces. "Avoid anything that can be turned against HN forces by insurgents."
4. Neutral elements – "Gain the support of uncommitted groups inside and outside the HN."
5. External hostile powers – "Convince hostile foreign [groups] the insurgency will fail."

== Direct military support not involving combat operations ==
=== Intelligence ===
The goal of intelligence sharing is to make the HN independent. Clearly, not every HN can afford space-based systems and other advanced, expensive technology. Advanced technologies, for security reasons, may not be appropriate to make available, in raw form, to third countries. Decisions on what can be shared and should be shared will involve the HN, the FID nation(s) country teams, the relevant combatant command, and the intelligence community.

==== Urban intelligence issues ====
Marighella speaks of the urban environment as being as or more concealing than the jungle. Walls, roofs, and other structural features interrupt line-of-sight (LOS) and make overhead imagery of less value in urban areas than in others. Such barriers preclude penetration by many sensors.

What is in the open or under visible camouflage nets elsewhere is completely hidden within structures during urban contingencies (i.e., defeating conventional imagery intelligence IMINT) Further, movement of units is less frequently evident. Well-trained organizations minimize exterior activities; their soldiers remain within buildings to the maximum extent possible to reduce detection. Vehicles leave few signs of their passage on asphalt and concrete, unlike in other areas where their tracks can be seen in dirt or compressed foliage. The same LOS obstacles that interfere with friendly force communications block signal-collection efforts. The city foe will in some in stances employ local telephone systems, cellular networks, or other communications systems for which friendly force military SIGINT capabilities were not designed. Such challenges mean that intelligence analysis during urban contingencies relies more on human intelligence (HUMINT) than is the norm.

Reports will have to be monitored, compiled, consolidated, and disseminated to not only intelligence nodes but also operational units with an immediate need to see specific items. The inordinate reliance on HUMINT magnifies the role of the CSS soldier as intelligence collector during urban operations. Neither the benefits nor the costs have heretofore been fully recognized.

==== Intelligence sharing ====
Where drugs or other materials are shipped by air, radar systems, both ground- and air-based, while powerful, are relatively straightforward to provide. The actual radar need not be operated by the HN or even in their country; the radar can send its information to a remote intelligence center.

More difficult are situations where the countries asking for support, such as ASEAN and allies both can offer sensitive HUMINT, but want to exchange for SIGINT from the US or allies such as Australia. These exchanges can be immensely valuable, but both sides may feel the need to sanitize detailed sources.

=== Aviation support ===
One of the more challenging FID roles is that of aviation, given that the US Air Force has long emphasized strategic attack and the de-emphasis of airpower's supporting functions have contributed to a doctrinal void regarding airpower's role in counterinsurgency.

== Direct combat role ==
=== Air interdiction and precision strikes ===
There is little place for air interdiction in fighting a local insurgency, in the most common sense of interrupting lines of supply. Only when the insurgents are being supplied from across a border, or at least from a remote area of sanctuary in the country, does this make sense. In the case, for example, of the Ho Chi Minh trail, any useful level of interdiction required either high-risk direct observation by special reconnaissance troops, or, in some cases, airborne sensors, such as the Vietnam-Era "Black Crow", which detected the "static" produced by the ignition system of trucks on the Ho Chi Minh trail, from distances up to 10 miles.

=== Direct action and unconventional warfare ===
When the FID force takes direct action, or leads UW forces, it needs a clear reason to do so. Jones cites some examples as:

1. Operations against Rogue, Hostile Regimes or State Sponsors of Terrorism—a proven operational concept having been used twice since September 11 in Afghanistan and Iraq. These operations will either be the decisive or shaping operation depending on the political sensitivity of the target country.
2. Operations against what will be referred to in this study as al Qa'ida states (AQ States) in which al Qa'ida is able to overthrow one or more of the regimes within the boundary of the 7th century caliphate. Unconventional warfare would be used to overthrow these regimes.
3. Operations in failed states when there is no effective government, but an element within the population, such as a tribe or ethnic group, is the State for all intents and purposes. In this case unconventional warfare will be used to overthrow this State.

== History ==
=== United Kingdom ===
The UK tends to see the FID mission more as a capability of regular forces than special operations forces, at the lowest level of intensity possible.

Sir Frank Kitson, former commander of UK land forces, said practical counterinsurgency had nothing "special" about it, but was mainstream British Army.

During the Malayan emergency, for example, the British Royal Air Force made extensive use of helicopters and fixed-wing transports to insert light infantry and Special Air Service units deep into the jungle, keeping them supplied by air for extended periods. These "deep-penetration" patrols were a key factor in defeating the Malayan insurgent forces in the more remote areas of the country

=== United States ===
==== Post WWII to Vietnam ====
US Army Special Forces' original mission was to train and lead guerrillas in a nation occupied by another: "[US Special Forces provided] advisory personnel and mobile training teams to advise, train and provide operational assistance for paramilitary forces."

In a November 1947 United States Department of the Army memorandum entitled A Study of Special and Subversive Operations, the authors point to the German example:

The means of counteracting resistance movements and activities demand special consideration. Our forces have had little experience in combating an active underground enemy. The problems which faced the Germans and the measures employed by them in counteracting partisan warfare should be studied. It is quite possible that a future war will find us occupying a hostile country in which exists an active underground. Or we might find ourselves in a friendly country, possibly the United States, facing an enemy while at the same time a hostile partisan force operates in our rear.

In the early 1950s, the Department of the Army's Military History Division published a number of studies, the "German Report Series", which were devised to glean lessons from the German World War II experience. Some studies in the series were written by former German generals and general staff officers. The publications among other issues also analyzed the German response to the threat of guerrilla warfare. Indeed, the Wehrmacht had attempted a systematic approach to the threat of partisan warfare during Operation Barbarossa (the Russian campaign) in 1941, and later in the Balkans.

Developed by the Wehrmacht, tactics against Soviet partisans would play a part in the development of a postwar doctrine for fighting communist guerrillas was perhaps a natural product of the Cold War hysteria of the 1950s. The army's 1956 book-length study Soviet Partisans was the last and most comprehensive of the "German Report Series" on anti-partisan warfare. Michael McClintock writes that, "The disturbing similarity between the Nazi's view of the world and the American stance in the Cold War apparently went by the board."

Related activities, just after WWII, included a Military Assistance Advisory Group (MAAG), first in Greece.

==== Vietnam ====
Starting from 1965, while they were not as properly trained for working with host nation personnel, the US Marine Corps Combined Action Program (CAP) also took on a role of reinforcing and training local village militias in the South Vietnam.

By 1967, the counterinsurgency military and civilian efforts in the South Vietnam were consolidated under the Civil Operations and Revolutionary Development Support (CORDS) command, which was shared between Saigon government, U.S. MACV and the CIA. Among CORDS multiple activities, the controversial Phoenix Program aimed at neutralizing the cadres of the Viet Cong Infrastructure (VCI) in South Vietnam, who created and executed a shadow system of government in the rural areas, stands out. In 1965–1972, the Phoenix Program "had eliminated upwards of 80,000 VCI through defection, detention, or death".

The Viet Cong insurgency in South Vietnam brought to life the "single largest and most comprehensive military counterinsurgency assessment apparatus in the history of warfare". It was run by the Office of the Secretary of Defense, MACV, and the Central Intelligence Agency. "Hundreds of thousands of military personnel, civilians, Vietnamese nationals, intelligence experts, and analysts" collected and assessed the insurgency related information from 44 provinces, 257 districts, 2,464 villages, and 11,729 hamlets in South Vietnam to aid in decision making and charting the counterinsurgency strategy and tactics. The data was organized through catalogs and computer databases, such as, the Hamlet Evaluation System, the Terrorist Incident Reporting System, the Territorial Forces Effectiveness System, the Pacification Attitude Analysis System, the Situation Reports Army File, among others. Input metric varied from bars of soap distributed among the villagers to the "body counts" as a measure of the primary progress.

==== Vietnam to 9/11 ====
According to Steven Metz, the United States had lost much of its counterinsurgency capabilities after the Vietnam War. Metz claims that the U.S. partly rebuilt their counterinsurgency abilities when the Soviet Union again began to sponsor insurgencies in third world countries such as El Salvador, but with the end of the cold war in the 1990s, he claims the U.S. again purged its counterinsurgency knowledge and capabilities, "assuming it was a legacy of the Cold War that would fade to irrelevance with the demise of the Soviet Union." During Operation Desert Storm, the swift and devastating use of technology in this conflict led many to believe that information warfare was the future face of combat.

==== Post 9/11 ====
===== Counterinsurgency in Iraq and Afghanistan =====
In a 1997 interview with CNN, Osama bin Laden, then leader of Al Qaeda, said in reference to the US withdrawal in Somalia, "After a little resistance, the American troops left after achieving nothing... They left after some resistance from powerless, poor, unarmed people whose only weapon is the belief in Allah the Almighty,". On September 11, 2001, bin Laden orchestrated the deadliest terrorist attack ever carried out on United States soil.

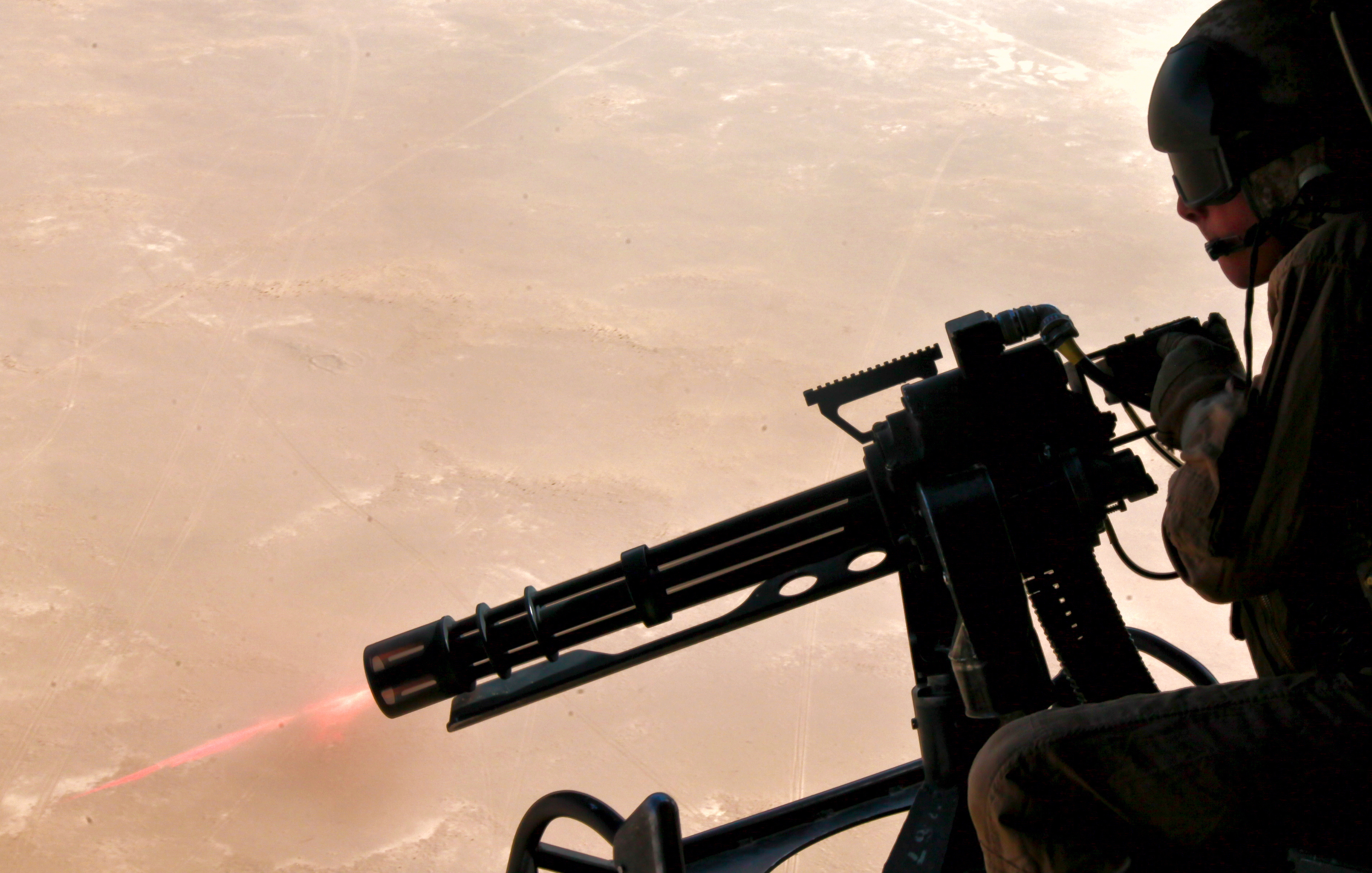
Sergeant Mathew Cummings fires a GAU-17 mini gun on a range outside Camp Bastion, 3 September in Southern Helmand Province.

Shortly after the September 11 attacks, the United States deployed forces to Afghanistan to overthrow the Taliban government which was harboring bin Laden. United States forces once again deployed superior technology, firepower, and tactics to defeat Taliban forces in a relatively short period. However, Afghanistan's history of a weak centralized government coupled with neighboring countries providing safe haven for Taliban leaders made the construction of a stable new government difficult. In 2006, there was a resurgence in Taliban insurgency in Afghanistan.

The invasion of Iraq during Operation Iraqi Freedom saw many parallels to the invasion of Afghanistan during Operation Enduring Freedom. United States ground troops entered Iraq in March 2001. The initial invasion of Iraq was characterized by "shock and awe". Shock and awe was a tactic designed to demonstrate the overwhelming power of the United States to the Iraqi people through a display of unmatched artillery and air power. This tactic resulted in US forces occupying the capital of Iraq, Baghdad, within two weeks of the invasion.

However, U.S. forces encountered pockets of Sunni resistance in Baghdad and surrounding cities. This resistance marked the beginnings of the insurgency that has plagued US forces during its occupation of Iraq. Several factors including a failure to restore public utilities, the disbanding of the Iraqi military, and violence between US troops and Iraqi civilians led to increased resistance and the formation of insurgent groups. The United States' postwar plan did not adequately prepare the U.S. for an insurgency scenario.

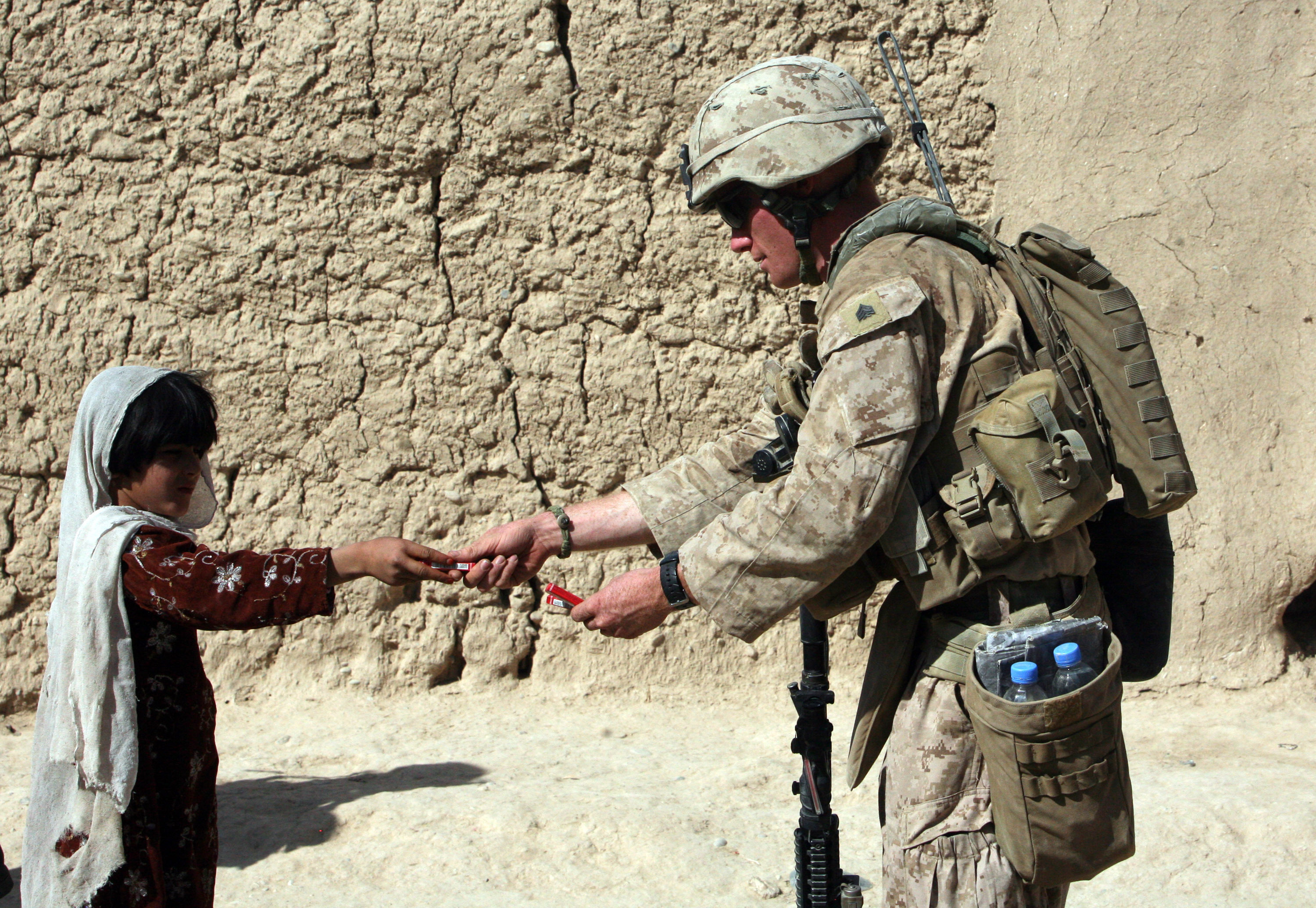
Sergeant Joshua Gray, hands a young Afghan girl a pack of gum while searching a compound for improvised explosive device material in Kunduz, 3 Nov.

The doctrine of shock and awe proved ineffective against eliminating small pockets of insurgent fighters. U.S. forces began to shift away from the shock and awe strategy to "hearts and minds". Hearts and minds shifted away from displays of massive firepower and attempted to persuade to local population to support the new government through more peaceful means The United States has sent millions of dollars of humanitarian aid to the people of Iraq and Afghanistan and U.S. forces have worked closely with other humanitarian groups such as the red cross to ensure that humanitarian aid is distributed throughout these areas.

In addition to winning the "hearts and minds" of the people, the United States vastly improved its intelligence gathering techniques in an effort to dismantle insurgency networks. In 2005, the NSA worked closely with the CIA to deploy airborne cameras and intercept cell phone signals around Iraq. This gave United States forces the ability to watch the country with what General McChrystal termed an "unblinking eye". This level of surveillance created a flow of intelligence that gave Special Forces teams the ability to conduct almost nightly raids against key targets in order to dismantle insurgency networks more effectively.

Another tactic used by the United States in both Iraq and Afghanistan is and effort to shift the responsibility of providing security for specific areas to the local populations by setting up local police forces. The Afghan Local Police (ALP) program assisted the US in raiding insurgent compounds and providing security for areas that US forces have cleared out of active insurgent groups. The ALP encountered difficulties recruiting individuals willing to defy the Taliban for fear of retaliation and a lack of funding from the local government.

The sale of heroin was used at least in part to fund insurgent activities in the country and cutting of the flow of cash became a top priority for the United States.

In 2018, journalist and former US Army Ranger Marty Skovlund Jr. documented a team from the United States Army Special Forces performing a FID mission to combat ISIS in Afghanistan.

===== Counterinsurgency in Colombia =====
Instead of deploying forces to Colombia to conduct counterinsurgency operations, the United States maintained a minimal presence. Instead, the United States focused on providing resources and training to the Colombian military and police force to conduct their own Counterinsurgency operations. By 2011, the FARC had been marginalized and Columbia had established a strong central government.

===== Preemptive counterinsurgency in Africa =====
The United States has maintained a presence in Africa in order to decrease the risk of an insurgency. In 2013, the U.S. had 5000 troops in Africa that "carried out 55 operations, 10 exercises and 481 security cooperation activities." The U.S. strategy in Africa is a three pronged approach that includes military support and training, highly advertised humanitarian projects, and intelligence gathering. When gathering intelligence, the United States has focused its efforts on cultural intelligence to support "Africom strategic movements on the continent." The end goal of the U.S. is to gather "...socio-cultural and political knowledge of the potential enemy before s/he becomes an enemy."

== Human rights violations ==
U.S. aid allowed the Salvadoran military to defeat the Farabundo Martí National Liberation Front (FMLN). In one particular case, the result was more than 800 civilians, including 131 children under the age of 12, murdered during search-and-destroy offensive. The plans to unleash terror against civilians became known to at least one U.S. Special Forces military adviser, which was revealed by Greg Walker, a former U.S. Army Special Forces Staff Sergeant, who served in El Salvador from 1982 to 1985. Moreover,

during the Reagan years in particular, not only did the United States fail to press for improvements ... but in an effort to maintain backing for U.S. policy, it misrepresented the record of the Salvadoran government and smeared critics who challenged that record. In so doing, the administration needlessly polarized the debate in the United States and did a grave injustice to the thousands of civilian victims of government terror in El Salvador.

Returning to the El Mozote massacre, it was duly reported to the American public by Ray Bonner from The New York Times and Anna Guillermoprieto from The Washington Post, however, the U.S. State Department denied the participation of the Salvadoran army in mass murder.
