= Rhein-Sieg-Kreis II =

Federal electoral district of Germany

97 Rhein-Sieg-Kreis II
- Electoral district for the Bundestag
- Rhein-Sieg-Kreis II in 2025
- State: North Rhine-Westphalia
- Population: 285,900 (2019)
- Electorate: 216,063 (2021)
- Major settlements: Sankt Augustin; Bornheim (Rheinland); Königswinter
- Area: 492.5 km^{2}

Current electoral district
- Created: 1980
- Party: CDU
- Member: Norbert Röttgen
- Elected: 1994, 1998, 2002, 2005, 2009, 2013, 2017, 2021, 2025

Rhein-Sieg-Kreis II is an electoral constituency (German: Wahlkreis) represented in the Bundestag. It elects one member via first-past-the-post voting. Under the current constituency numbering system, it is designated as constituency 97. It is located in southwestern North Rhine-Westphalia, comprising the western part of the Rhein-Sieg-Kreis district.

Rhein-Sieg-Kreis II was created for the 1980 federal election. Since 1994, it has been represented by Norbert Röttgen of the Christian Democratic Union (CDU).

== Geography ==
Rhein-Sieg-Kreis II is located in southwestern North Rhine-Westphalia. As of the 2021 federal election, it comprises the municipalities of Alfter, Bad Honnef, Bornheim, Königswinter, Meckenheim, Rheinbach, Sankt Augustin, Swisttal, and Wachtberg from the Rhein-Sieg-Kreis district.

== History ==
Rhein-Sieg-Kreis II was created in 1980 and contained parts of the redistributed Rhein-Sieg-Kreis I constituency. In the 1980 through 1998 elections, it was constituency 65 in the numbering system. From 2002 through 2009, it was number 99. In the 2013 through 2021 elections, it was number 98. From the 2025 election, it has been number 97. Its borders have not changed since its creation.

== Members ==
The constituency has been held continuously by the Christian Democratic Union (CDU) since its creation. It was first represented by Franz Möller 1980 to 1994. Since 1994, it has been represented by Norbert Röttgen.

Election	Member	Party	%
1980	Franz Möller	CDU	54.5
1983	Franz Möller	CDU	61.0
1987	Franz Möller	CDU	55.4
1990	Franz Möller	CDU	52.7
1994	Norbert Röttgen	CDU	49.8
1998	Norbert Röttgen	CDU	48.8
2002	Norbert Röttgen	CDU	48.2
2005	Norbert Röttgen	CDU	51.8
2009	Norbert Röttgen	CDU	50.3
2013	Norbert Röttgen	CDU	52.4
2017	Norbert Röttgen	CDU	46.5
2021	Norbert Röttgen	CDU	40.0
2025	Norbert Röttgen	CDU	43.8

== Election results ==
=== 2025 election ===
Federal election (2025): Rhein-Sieg-Kreis II
Notes:	Blue background denotes the winner of the electorate vote. Pink background denotes a candidate elected from their party list. Yellow background denotes an electorate win by a list member, or other incumbent. A ✓ or ✗ denotes status of any incumbent, win or lose respectively.						
Party	Candidate	Votes	%	±%	Party votes	%	±%
CDU	✓ Norbert Röttgen	79,638	43.8	▲3.8	63,717	35.0	▲5.4
SPD	Ute Krupp	32,287	17.8	▼5.6	30,333	16.6	▼7.2
AfD	Roger Beckamp	25,830	14.2	▲8.3	26,034	14.3	▲8.3
Greens	Moritz Wächter	23,157	12.7	▼2.6	26,800	14.7	▼3.0
Left	Heinz-Peter Schulz	9,770	5.4	▲2.7	11,888	6.5	▲3.3
BSW					6,637	3.6	
FDP	Nicole Westig	5,879	3.2	▼4.7	10,261	5.6	▼7.7
Volt	Valeska Huland	3,034	1.7	▲1.0	1,650	0.9	▲0.3
FW	Michael Stehr	2,139	1.2	▲0.2	898	0.5	▼0.3
Tierschutzpartei					1,853	1.0	▼0.2
PARTEI				▼1.4	821	0.5	▼0.4
dieBasis				▼1.3	436	0.2	▼1.0
PdF					278	0.2	▲0.1
Team Todenhöfer					269	0.1	▼0.3
Values					129	0.1	
MERA25					46	0.0	
MLPD					24	0.0	0.0
Pirates							▼0.3
Gesundheitsforschung							▼0.1
Bündnis C							▼0.1
ÖDP							▼0.1
Humanists							▼0.1
SGP						0.0	0.0
Informal votes		1,436			891		
Total valid votes		181,734			181,279		
Turnout		183,170	85.5	▲3.7			
CDU hold	Majority	47,351	26.0				

=== 2021 election ===
Federal election (2021): Rhein-Sieg-Kreis II
Notes:	Blue background denotes the winner of the electorate vote. Pink background denotes a candidate elected from their party list. Yellow background denotes an electorate win by a list member, or other incumbent. A ✓ or ✗ denotes status of any incumbent, win or lose respectively.						
Party	Candidate	Votes	%	±%	Party votes	%	±%
CDU	✓ Norbert Röttgen	70,144	40.0	▼6.5	51,795	29.5	▼5.9
SPD	Katja Stoppenbrink	41,004	23.4	▲0.7	41,753	23.8	▲3.8
Greens	Richard Ralfs	26,956	15.4	▲7.5	31,027	17.7	▲8.9
FDP	Nicole Westig	13,914	7.9	▼0.4	23,435	13.4	▼4.0
AfD	Roger Beckamp	10,385	5.9	▼2.5	10,551	6.0	▼2.8
Left	Andreas Danne	4,607	2.6	▼2.9	5,687	3.2	▼3.2
Tierschutzpartei					2,215	1.3	▲0.6
PARTEI	Marcel Bratwurst Klingenstein	2,537	1.4		1,530	0.9	▲0.1
dieBasis	Nathalie Sanchez Friedrich	2,285	1.3		2,111	1.2	
FW	Michael Stehr	1,697	1.0		1,303	0.7	▲0.5
Volt	Philipp Prause	1,140	0.7		1,022	0.6	
Team Todenhöfer					855	0.5	
Pirates					599	0.3	0.0
Volksabstimmung	Andreas Frick	484	0.3	▼0.3			
LIEBE					223	0.1	
Gesundheitsforschung					196	0.1	0.0
LfK					170	0.1	
Bündnis C					169	0.1	
ÖDP					166	0.1	0.0
Humanists					135	0.1	0.0
V-Partei3					128	0.1	0.0
NPD					112	0.1	▼0.1
LKR	Jörg Drenkelfort	167	0.1		78	0.0	
PdF					61	0.0	
du.					59	0.0	
MLPD					20	0.0	0.0
DKP					11	0.0	0.0
SGP					10	0.0	0.0
Informal votes		1,317			1,216		
Total valid votes		175,320			175,421		
Turnout		176,637	81.8	▲1.0			
CDU hold	Majority	29,140	16.6	▼7.2			

=== 2017 election ===
Federal election (2017): Rhein-Sieg-Kreis II
Notes:	Blue background denotes the winner of the electorate vote. Pink background denotes a candidate elected from their party list. Yellow background denotes an electorate win by a list member, or other incumbent. A ✓ or ✗ denotes status of any incumbent, win or lose respectively.						
Party	Candidate	Votes	%	±%	Party votes	%	±%
CDU	✓ Norbert Röttgen	80,441	46.5	▼5.8	61,425	35.5	▼9.9
SPD	Bettina Bähr-Losse	39,246	22.7	▼4.4	34,583	20.0	▼4.3
AfD	Manfred Berchem	14,592	8.4	▲5.3	15,226	8.8	▲4.3
FDP	Nicole Westig	14,491	8.4	▲5.3	30,142	17.4	▲9.1
Greens	Martin Metz	13,643	7.9	▲0.7	15,192	8.8	▲0.1
Left	Michael Droste	9,543	5.5	▲2.2	11,116	6.4	▲1.9
PARTEI					1,268	0.7	▲0.4
Tierschutzpartei					1,092	0.6	
Pirates					596	0.3	▼1.6
FW					457	0.3	▼0.1
Volksabstimmung	Claus Plantiko	942	0.5	▲0.2	337	0.2	▼0.1
NPD					246	0.1	▼0.5
BGE					221	0.1	
ÖDP					216	0.1	0.0
DiB					213	0.1	
V-Partei³					209	0.1	
DM					178	0.1	
AD-DEMOKRATEN					159	0.1	
Gesundheitsforschung					123	0.1	
Die Humanisten					102	0.1	
MLPD					42	0.0	0.0
DKP					15	0.0	
SGP					5	0.0	0.0
Informal votes		1,615			1,350		
Total valid votes		172,898			173,163		
Turnout		174,513	80.8	▲3.8			
CDU hold	Majority	41,195	23.8	▼1.5			

=== 2013 election ===
Federal election (2013): Rhein-Sieg-Kreis II
Notes:	Blue background denotes the winner of the electorate vote. Pink background denotes a candidate elected from their party list. Yellow background denotes an electorate win by a list member, or other incumbent. A ✓ or ✗ denotes status of any incumbent, win or lose respectively.						
Party	Candidate	Votes	%	±%	Party votes	%	±%
CDU	✓ Norbert Röttgen	85,058	52.4	▲2.1	73,860	45.3	▲8.2
SPD	Bettina Bähr-Losse	44,098	27.1	▲2.4	39,571	24.3	▲3.5
Greens	Arnd Kuhn	11,732	7.2	▼1.6	14,122	8.7	▼1.9
Left	Andreas Danne	5,445	3.4	▼1.3	7,433	4.6	▼0.9
FDP	Thorsten Knott	5,058	3.1	▼6.9	13,468	8.3	▼13.5
AfD	Vladimir Skoda	5,058	3.1		7,362	4.5	
Pirates	Jakob Jürgen Weiler	3,151	1.9		3,163	1.9	▲0.4
NPD	Ariane Christine Meise	1,207	0.7	▼0.2	1,091	0.7	▼0.1
PARTEI					589	0.4	
FW	Iris Häger	1,040	0.6		585	0.4	
Volksabstimmung	Claus Plantiko	598	0.4	▼0.2	421	0.3	0.0
PRO					299	0.2	
ÖDP					270	0.2	▼0.1
Nichtwahler					163	0.1	
BIG					146	0.1	
Party of Reason					115	0.1	
REP					111	0.1	▼0.1
RRP					75	0.0	▼0.1
BüSo					21	0.0	0.0
MLPD					18	0.0	0.0
PSG					17	0.0	0.0
Die Rechte					10	0.0	
Informal votes		2,190			1,725		
Total valid votes		162,445			162,910		
Turnout		164,635	77.0	▲0.7			
CDU hold	Majority	40,960	25.3	▼0.3			

=== 2009 election ===
Federal election (2009): Rhein-Sieg-Kreis II
Notes:	Blue background denotes the winner of the electorate vote. Pink background denotes a candidate elected from their party list. Yellow background denotes an electorate win by a list member, or other incumbent. A ✓ or ✗ denotes status of any incumbent, win or lose respectively.						
Party	Candidate	Votes	%	±%	Party votes	%	±%
CDU	✓ Norbert Röttgen	80,363	50.3	▼1.5	59,487	37.2	▼3.9
SPD	Ulrike Merten	39,489	24.7	▼10.6	33,235	20.8	▼9.7
FDP	Thorsten Knott	16,012	10.0	▲5.3	34,858	21.8	▲7.1
Greens	Arnd Kuhn	14,046	8.8	▲4.2	16,898	10.6	▲2.4
Left	Heinz-Jürgen Hörster	7,430	4.7	▲2.0	8,800	5.5	▲2.0
Pirates					2,445	1.5	
NPD	Wolfgang Bruhn	1,443	0.9	▲0.2	1,188	0.7	▲0.1
Tierschutzpartei					974	0.6	▲0.2
FAMILIE					605	0.4	▲0.1
Volksabstimmung	Werner Henrichs	969	0.6	▲0.3	452	0.3	▲0.2
RENTNER					331	0.2	
REP					224	0.1	0.0
RRP					163	0.1	
ÖDP					149	0.1	
Centre					96	0.1	0.0
DVU					69	0.0	
MLPD					27	0.0	0.0
BüSo					15	0.0	0.0
PSG					15	0.0	0.0
Informal votes		1,994			1,715		
Total valid votes		159,752			160,031		
Turnout		161,746	76.3	▼5.5			
CDU hold	Majority	40,874	25.6	▲9.1			

=== 2005 election ===
Federal election (2005): Rhein-Sieg-Kreis II
Notes:	Blue background denotes the winner of the electorate vote. Pink background denotes a candidate elected from their party list. Yellow background denotes an electorate win by a list member, or other incumbent. A ✓ or ✗ denotes status of any incumbent, win or lose respectively.						
Party	Candidate	Votes	%	±%	Party votes	%	±%
CDU	✓ Norbert Röttgen	87,736	51.8	▲3.6	69,678	41.0	▼1.7
SPD	Ulrike Merten	59,838	35.3	▼1.4	51,802	30.5	▼1.7
FDP	Carl Sonnenschein	8,063	4.8	▼3.4	24,947	14.7	▲2.3
Greens	Robert de la Haye	7,708	4.5	▼1.0	13,843	8.2	▼1.8
Left	Uwe Groeneveld	4,492	2.7	▲1.9	5,867	3.5	▲2.6
NPD	Wolfgang Bruhn	1,130	0.7	▲0.2	1,099	0.6	▲0.4
Tierschutzpartei					675	0.4	▲0.1
GRAUEN					483	0.3	▲0.1
From Now on... Democracy Through Referendum	Lothar Bollwig	474	0.3	▲0.2	197	0.1	
Familie					468	0.3	▲0.1
PBC					304	0.2	
REP					232	0.1	
Socialist Equality Party					49	0.0	
Centre					49	0.0	
BüSo					32	0.0	
MLPD					29	0.0	0.0
Informal votes		1,674			1,361		
Total valid votes		169,441			169,754		
Turnout		171,115	81.8	▼2.4			
CDU hold	Majority	27,898	16.5				
