= Metz (disambiguation) =

Metz is a city in the northeast of France at the confluence of the Moselle and the Seille rivers.

Metz may also refer to:

== Places ==
=== United States ===
- Metz, California
- Metz, Indiana
- Metz, Iowa
- Metz, Missouri
- Metz, West Virginia
- Metz, Wisconsin
- Metz Township, Michigan

=== Australia ===
- Metz, a former mining town now part of Hillgrove, New South Wales

=== France ===
- Metz-le-Comte
- Metz-en-Couture
- Metz-Robert
- Metz-Tessy
- Pont-de-Metz

== Companies and businesses ==
- Metz & Co, an exclusive department store in Amsterdam, the Netherlands
- Metz (company), German electronics and photographic equipment maker
- Metz Company, American manufacturer of early automobiles
- Metz et Cie, steel company in Luxembourg that was incorporated into ARBED in 1911
- Metz Brewery, first brewery in the U.S. state of Nebraska

== Other uses ==
- Metz (drink), a discontinued alcopop brand produced by Barcardi
- Metz (surname)
- Metz family, a prominent historical political family in Luxembourg
- Metz Cathedral in Metz, France
- Diocese of Metz in Metz, France
- Metz Congress, 1979 meeting of the French Socialist Party
- FC Metz, or Football Club de Metz, a French football (soccer) team
- Metzenbaum scissors
- Metz (band), Canadian punk band
  - Metz (album), a 2012 album by the band

== See also ==
- Kronmetz, German name of the Italian city Mezzocorona
- Wällisch Metz, German name of the Italian city Mezzolombardo
- Deutsch Metz, German name of the Italian city Mezzotedesco
- Mez (disambiguation)
