= Mez =

Mez or MEZ may refer to:

- Mez Breeze, Australian artist
- Mez, American rapper
- Carl Christian Mez (1866–1944), German botanist whose standard author abbreviation is Mez
- Maz (Romanized: Mez), a village in Fars Province, Iran
- Mactan Enerzone Corporation
- Maritime Exclusion Zone, a military exclusion zone at sea
- Maryland Enterprise Zone
- Mena Intermountain Municipal Airport (FAA LID: MEZ), an airport in Mena, Arkansas
- Menominee language (ISO 639-3: mez), a language spoken by the Menominee people
- Mitteleuropäische Zeit (MEZ), or Middle European Time (MET), equivalent to Central European Time (CET)

== See also ==
- Metz (disambiguation)
