= Metzl =

Metzl is a surname. Notable people with this surname include:

- Ervine Metzl (1899–1963), American graphic illustrator
- Jamie Metzl (born c. 1968), American futurist
- Jonathan Metzl (born 1964), American psychiatrist and author

== See also ==
- Metz (surname)
