= Bettina Bähr-Losse =

German lawyer and politician

Member of the Bundestag for North Rhine-Westphalia
- In office 1 October 2016 – 24 October 2017
- Preceded by: Peer Steinbrück
- Constituency: Social Democratic List

Personal details
- Born: 28 January 1967 (age 59) Braunschweig

Bettina Bähr-Losse (born 28 January 1967) is a German lawyer and politician (SPD). From 1 October 2016 until the end of the 2017 legislative period, she was a member of the Bundestag.

== Early life and career ==
Bettina Bähr-Losse was born in Braunschweig, where she obtained her early education at the Jugenddorf-Christophorusschule Braunschweig. She went on to study law at the universities in Regensburg, Göttingen and Bonn. After the legal clerkship in the district of the Higher Regional Court of Cologne she is a lawyer in Sankt Augustin with family law as a focal point of her law practice.

== Political career ==
Bähr-Losse is deputy leader of the SPD parliamentary group in the district council of Rhein-Sieg-Kreis. In the Federal election 2013 she ran in Rhein-Sieg-Kreis II, but won no mandate. Since she was second of the SPD party list in North Rhine-Westphalia for the 18th Bundestag, she replaced Peer Steinbrück on 1 October 2016 in the Bundestag. However, at the federal election 2017 she was again unable to win a mandate.
