= Roger Beckamp =

German politician

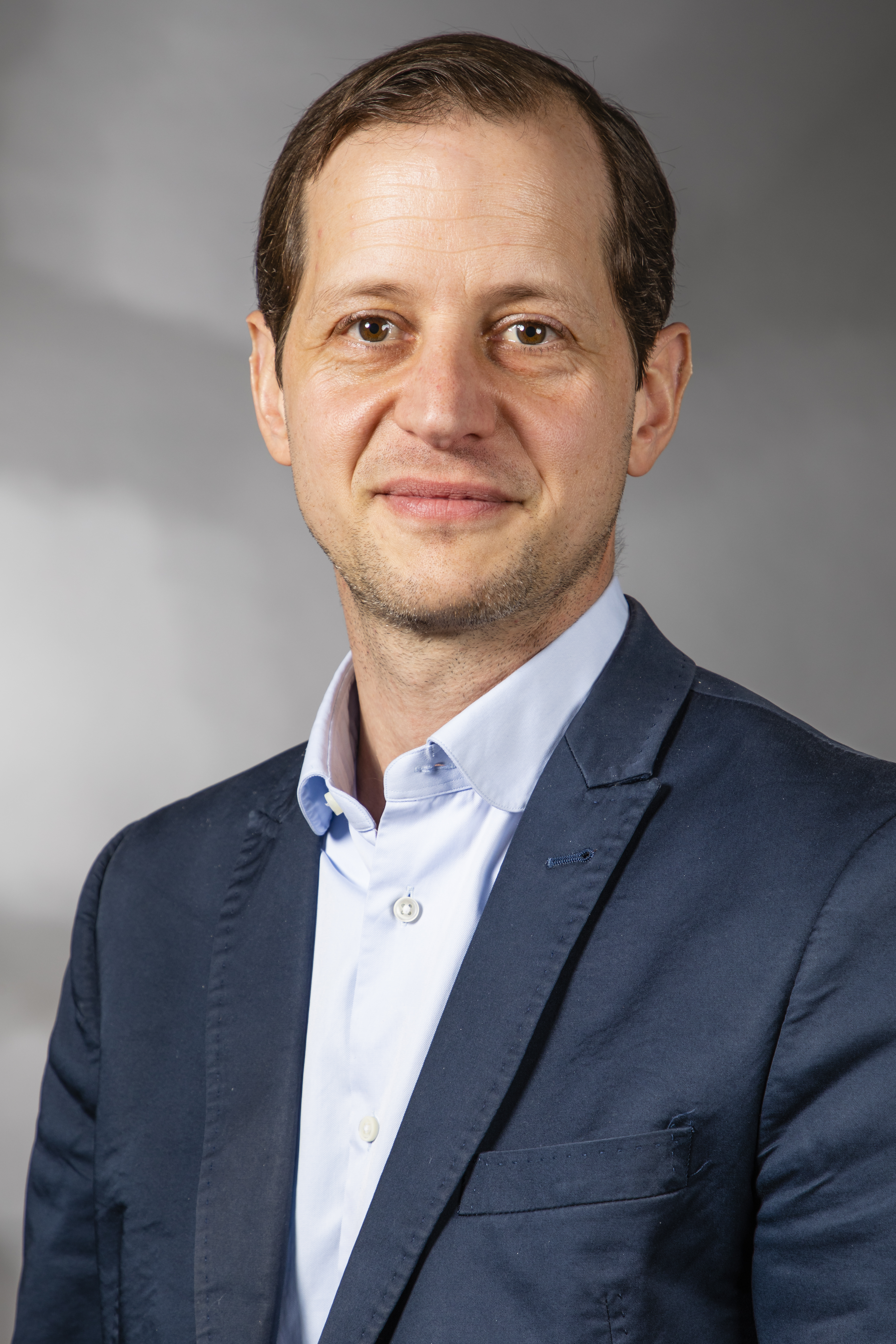
Beckamp in 2019

Roger Friedrich Nikolaus Beckamp (born 18 July 1975) is a German politician from the AfD. He was a Member of the German Bundestag from North Rhine-Westphalia from 2021 to 2025.

== Early life ==
Beckhamp was born in Cologne.

== Political career ==
Beckhamp sat in the Landtag of North Rhine-Westphalia.

In the 2021 German federal election, he contested the constituency of Rhein-Sieg-Kreis II but came in fifth place. He was elected via the state list.

Beckamp denied as early as 2018 that Crimea is occupied by Russia and is part of the pro-Russia movement of AfD.

In December 2024, Beckamp participated in a meeting in Kloten, Switzerland, which was revealed by investigative journalism network Correctiv. The meeting included AfD politicians and representatives of far right groups, including members of the Blood & Honour movement, which is banned in Germany, and the Swiss group Junge Tat. The gathering reportedly discussed "remigration" plans.

== See also ==
- List of members of the 20th Bundestag
