= Motz (surname) =

Motz is a surname. Notable people with the name include:

- Anna Motz (born 1964), American psychologist
- Diana Gribbon Motz (born 1943), United States circuit judge
- Dick Motz (1940–2007), New Zealand cricketer
- Elsie Motz Lowdon (1883–1960; née Motz) American painter
- Frank Motz (1869–1944), American baseball player
- Glen Motz (born 1958), Canadian politician
- Hans Motz (1909–1987), Austrian-born physicist in the United Kingdom
- J. Frederick Motz (1942–2023), United States district judge
- John Motz (1830–1911), German-born Canadian politician, German-language newspaper proprietor and sheriff
- Lloyd Motz (1909–2004), American astronomer
- Lotte Motz (1922–1997), Austrian-American scholar
- Roger Motz (1904–1964), Belgian politician
- Walter Motz, German cross-country skier of the 1930s

== See also ==
- Wilhelm Amsinck Burchard-Motz (1878–1963), German lawyer and politician
- Metz (surname)
