= Metz family =

The Metz family is a family in Luxembourg that was prominent in politics and industry in the mid- and late nineteenth century and early twentieth century. The head of the household was Jean Metz, who had nine children. This second generation included Auguste Metz, Charles Metz, and Norbert Metz, who were all leading liberal politicians during the early stages of Luxembourg's independence, in the mid-nineteenth century. These three brothers defined political and economic life in Luxembourg in the mid-nineteenth century, and their children also became influential in politics and industry.

The Metz family also inter-married with other famous and powerful Luxembourgian families, including the Le Gallais, Vannérus, Laval, and Laeis families.

== Family tree ==
Below is a partial family tree, showing some of the most prominent family members. People have the surname Metz unless stated otherwise.

Metz family tree

Anne-Marie-Justine Gérard; 1771–1829	Jean Metz; 1763–1815
Justine Vannérus; 1808–1849	Charles; 1799–1853	6 other issue	Marie-Barbe Tesch; 1813–1853	Norbert; 1811–1885	Marie Tesch; 1832–1901	Auguste; 1812–1854	Petronille Laeis; 1823–1886
6 other issue	Léonie; 1836–1909	Edmond Le Gallais; 1814–1873	Gustave; 1838–1895	Émile; 1835–1904	Marie-Madeleine	Léon; 1842–1928	3 other issue
4 other issue	Norbert Le Gallais; 1860–1934	Juliette; 1872–1909
