= Nicole Westig =

German politician

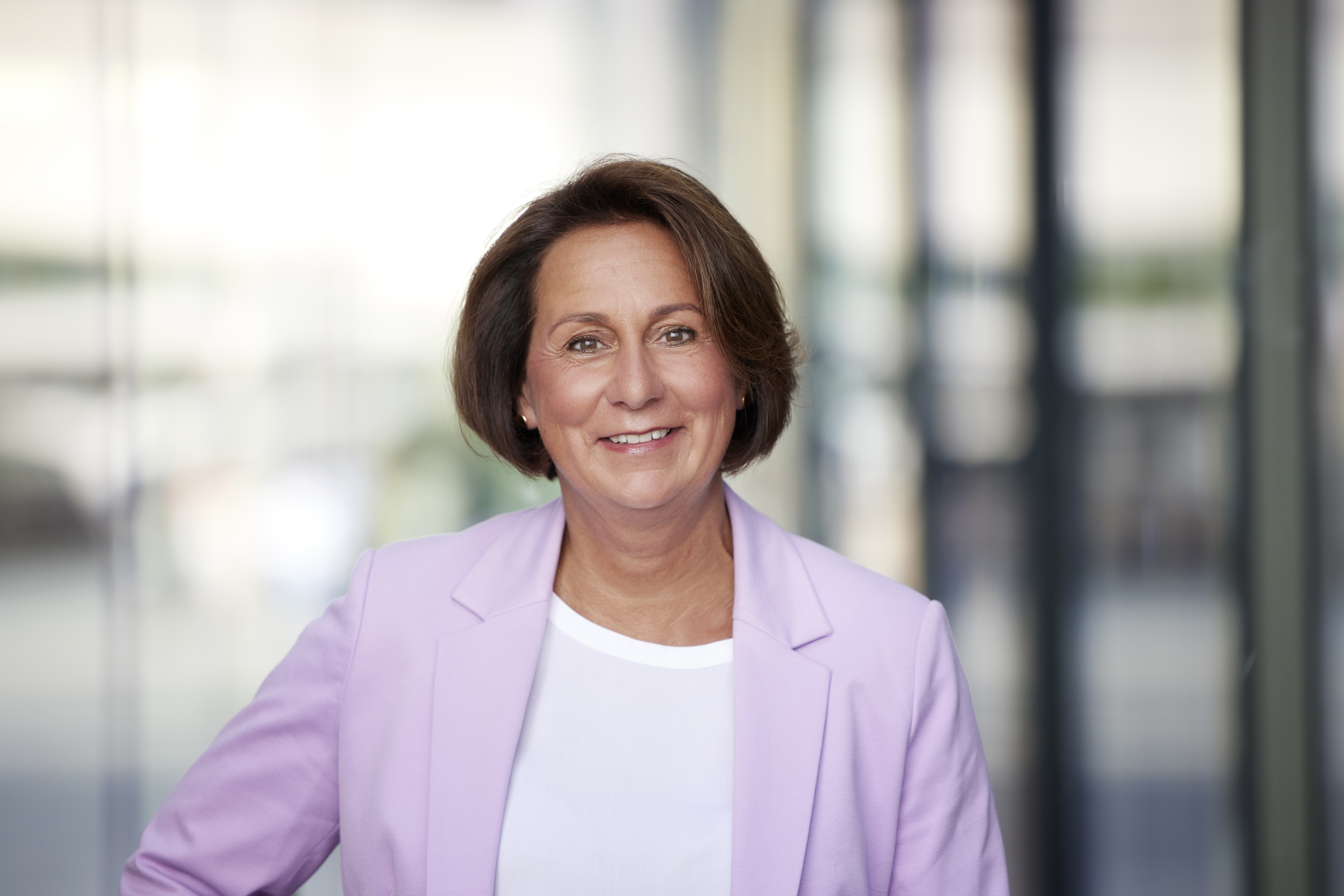
- Westig in 2023

Member of the Bundestag
- In office 2017–2025

Personal details
- Born: 13 November 1967 (age 58) Menden, West Germany (now Germany)
- Party: FDP
- Children: 2

Nicole Westig (born 13 November 1967) is a German politician of the Free Democratic Party (FDP) who served as a member of the Bundestag from the state of North Rhine-Westphalia from 2017 to 2025.

== Early life and career ==
Westig grew up in her birthplace and graduated from high school there in 1987. From 1988 she studied Romance, Hispanic and Public Law at the University of Bonn, graduating as Magistra Artium in 1996.

Westig was then employed by the German Association for Small and Medium-sized Businesses (BVMW), after which she worked independently in the field of press and public relations. From 2008 to 2014 she worked for the FDP as an advisor to Gerhard Papke at the State Parliament of North Rhine-Westphalia, after which she switched to fundraising in the charitable sector.

== Political career ==
Westig first became a member of the Bundestag in the 2017 German federal election. In parliament, she served as a member of the Health Committee, where she was her parliamentary group’s spokesperson for nursing.

In the negotiations to form a so-called traffic light coalition of the Social Democratic Party (SPD), the Green Party and the FDP following the 2021 federal elections, Westig was part of her party's delegation in the working group on health, co-chaired by Katja Pähle, Maria Klein-Schmeink and Christine Aschenberg-Dugnus.

In addition to her committee assignments, Westig was a member of the German delegation to the Franco-German Parliamentary Assembly from 2022 to 2025.

== Other activities ==
- Haus der Geschichte, Member of the Board of Trustees (since 2023)
