= Gertrud Metz =

German painter

Maria Gertrud Metz (born 1746 in Bonn, died 1793 in London), also known as Gertrude or Gertrudis Metz, was a German still life painter.

== Life ==
Gertrud Metz was baptized on January 15, 1746, in Bonn. Her father was Johann Martin Metz (1717 or 1730 – 1790), a German painter. Among her siblings are counted the painters Conrad Martin Metz (1749–1827) and Caroline Metz.

Her father gave her her first lessons in painting; later in life she went on to attend the Kunstakademie Düsseldorf. One of her artistic role models was the Dutch still-life artist Rachel Ruysch; Metz had had the opportunity to see Ruysch's paintings exhibited in the Gemäldegalerie Düsseldorf. Metz returned from her studies in 1775; at this point her father realized that her artistic skill had overtaken his own.

Getrud Metz's permanent place of residence was in Cologne, but from 1772 she lived with her sister several times. Starting in 1781 she spent time living with her father in London, where she had previously exhibited her works: in 1772 in the Spring Garden Rooms and from 1773 at the Royal Academy of Arts. Her work, as well as her father's, was popular and sought after in London. She died in 1793 in London.

== Works ==
Gertrud Metz painted still lives, usually depicting flowers, fruit, or animals. Her main media were canvas and copper. Stylistically, her works follow the style of Dutch artists like Rachel Ruysch, whom she much admired. She often signed her works as "Gertr. Metz" or "M. Gerdrudis Metz. F."

=== List of works (not complete) ===
- Stillleben mit Früchten, 55 × 43.5 cm, canvas, Bavarian State Painting Collections - Alte Pinakothek, Munich, Germany (moved 1799 from Galerie Mannheim)
- Blumen in brauer Kelchschale, daneben auf der Marmorplatte des Tisches ein Vogelnest mit Eiern, 55 × 44 cm, canvas, signed, Alte Pinakothek (from 1908; previously Galerie Mannheim)
- Früchtearrangement, 33 × 42 cm, oil on copperplate, Finnish National Gallery
- Blumenstück / Allegorie des Frühlings, LWL-Museum für Kunst und Kultur, Münster, Germany
- Früchtestillleben mit Austern, LWL-Museum für Kunst und Kultur, Münster, Germany
- Tulpe und Nelke mit Schmetterling, Wallraf–Richartz Museum, Cologne, Germany
- two flower paintings, Schleissheim Palace, Munich, Germany
- two still lives (flowers and fruits), Museum Bayreuth
- Stillleben mit Rosen, Tulpen, Narzissen, Chrysanthemen sowie Früchten, einer Schnecke, einer Schlange und Insekten, 76 × 62 cm, oil on canvas, signed
