= McCormick Magic Diamond =

Counterinsurgency model

A variety of models for understanding insurgency and planning the counterinsurgency (COIN) response have been developed. One model that has become respected both in academic and military context is the "Magic Diamond" model developed by Gordon McCormick of the RAND Corporation. The model involved four key elements or players, with mirrored strategies for their interactions. Each element will have a "mirrored" strategy, in which the way in which it imposes or aids insurgency is one image, and where the way that it interacts with counterinsurgency is the reflection.

This model develops a symmetrical view of the required actions for both the Insurgent and COIN forces to achieve success. In this way the counterinsurgency model can demonstrate how both the insurgent and COIN forces succeed or fail. The model's strategies and principle apply to both forces, therefore the degree the forces follow the model should have a direct correlation to the success or failure of either the Insurgent or COIN force.

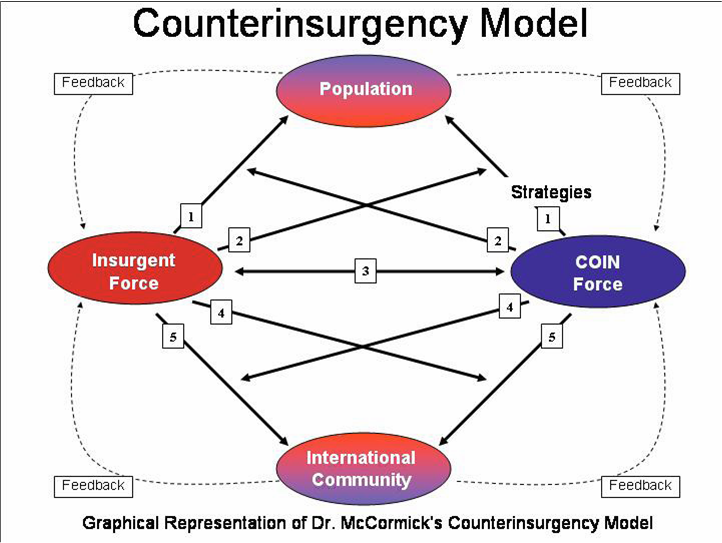
McCormick insurgency model

== Elements ==
In each specific situation, the components and culture of the elements will vary, but the four will always be present.

=== Insurgent Force (IF) ===
This is composed of the group (or groups in a multipolar situation such as Iraq) that is operating to oust the government or occupation force. In addition to fighters, it includes auxiliaries in the support network, leadership, and foreign assistants. When the IF acts as a shadow government, collecting taxes, it can be hard to tell when an individual is truly a supporter, or coerced into payment. Distinguishing between the voluntary insurgent, the coerced supporter, and the innocent bystander is one of the most difficult obstacles (if not the most difficult) for the COIN force. They [insurgents] typically have sources of support among the local populace of the same ethnicity with whom their separatist goals (or appeals to blood links) may resonate.

As in Iraq, multiple organizations can be both IF and competitors with one another. In Cuba and Vietnam, the IF still generally believed in a single-state solution, but Iraq is unpredictable. As part of Sudan's power-sharing agreement, there will be a referendum on whether to stay one nation or split on a north–south boundary.

=== The Counterinsurgency Force ===
The counterinsurgency force (CF) is the current government [i.e., Host Nation (HN)] or occupying force in the region. These are the forces on the ground that are in direct combat with the IF. There is normally a single force that is the lead in the COIN effort, but other troops, organizations, or countries can provide additional forces to augment the CF. The CF must integrate all elements of national power: civil, military, diplomatic, informational, economic, and financial capabilities. These forces include, but are not limited to: military, police, security forces, intelligence infrastructure, and trainers/advisors.

The CF is defined by the insurgent's perceptions; if forces are present that believe they are not taking an active role in the COIN effort (i.e. peacekeepers or observers), but are perceived by the IF as influencing the situation, then those forces have become part of the CF. The corollary is true of the CF defining the IF, but the CF normally has a greater "burden of proof" dictated by the media and international oversight.

The CF must clearly identify legitimate targets among insurgents that can often blend in with the local populace, while the IF can easily identify conventional COIN Forces by their large and obvious signature (uniforms, bases, vehicles...).

=== The Population ===
The Population consists of the non-combatants in the disputed region. While support may be coerced out of the Population they are not considered insurgents until they provide additional support beyond that required to avoid reprisals. For example, during the War in El Salvador the insurgents (and often government forces too) required water and tortillas from the Population. Failure to provide this subsistence support was deemed to indicate affiliation with the opponent and would result in immediate reprisals.

The people that provided this support were not considered combatants (pro-insurgent or pro-government) until support was provided above (more than water and tortillas) or below (not even water and tortillas) the base level. When the people provide information, early warning, take up arms, or any other form of active or passive support, they are choosing a side and are no longer non-combatants or members of the population.

=== The International Community ===
McCormick defines this as the set of nation states, international organizations, and nongovernmental organizations that are not perceived as biased either to the IF or CF.

"The International Community can introduce troops into a region without choosing sides, for example peacekeeping forces, and thus retain non-combatant status as long as their presence does not construe support for the IF or CF. Maintaining the perception of neutrality can be a difficult task and members of the International Community can transition from external supporter to participant either intentionally or unknowingly.

For example, the Pakistani Military in Somalia was under the auspices of UN Peacekeeping and Humanitarian Assistance; while providing food to starving Somalis. The UN forces viewed this as a neutral act which provided them sanctuary from attack. The Somali warlord, Mohamed Farrah Aidid, viewed the distribution of food as a threat to his control over the population and ordered an ambush of a UN convoy killing 18 Pakistani soldiers. The IF perception of the UN had shifted. The UN Peacekeepers (i.e., UNISOM II) showed an influence that was not directed against the IF, but did have the indirect effect of undermining the IF authority and control. This perceived influence in the eyes of the IF made the peacekeepers members of the CF and legitimate targets.

== Interactions ==
Each of the elements will have a basic set of interactions with the other elements:

1. Gaining Support of the Population
2. Disrupt Opponent's Control Over the Population
3. Direct Action Against Opponent
4. Disrupt Opponent's Relations with the International Community
5. Establish Relationships with the International Community

Each element will receive feedback from the others.

== Other Models ==
There are multiple models of the strength and stability of nation-states, and several are useful here. FID is never a quick process. The major power(s) uses nonmilitary and military means to increase the capability of the host nation (HN) to resist insurgency. FID includes the economic stabilization of host countries.

Some well-known models, which can be complementary to McCormick, come from Kilcullen, Barnett and Eizenstat.

Much focus today is on transnational terrorism, principally with an extreme Islamic motivation. On a worldwide basis, however, there are conflicts involving terrorism that has no significant Islamic component, such as the LTTE Tamil insurgency in Sri Lanka. Other transnational concerns include drug and diamond trafficking, piracy, and epidemic disease. The term Global War on Terror has been criticized, but there may be utility in examining a war not specifically on the tactic of terror, but in one or more, potentially cooperating insurgencies. "the utility of analyzing the war on terrorism using an insurgency/counterinsurgency conceptual framework. Additionally, the recommendations can be applied to the strategic campaign, even if it is politically unfeasible to address the war as an insurgency."
