= Charles Metz =

Luxembourgish politician, journalist and lawyer (1799–1853)

Charles Gérard Emmanuel Metz
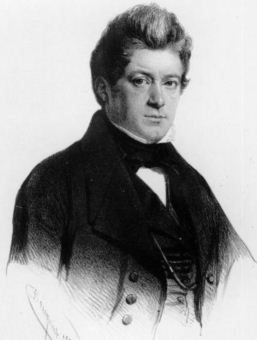

1st President of the Chamber of Deputies
- In office 1848–1853

Member of the Chamber of Deputies for Luxembourg-Campagne
- In office 1848–1853

Personal details
- Born: 6 January 1799 Luxembourg City
- Died: 24 April 1853 (aged 54) Diekirch
- Occupation: Journalist

Charles Gérard Emmanuel Metz (6 January 1799 – 24 April 1853) was a Luxembourgish politician, journalist, and lawyer. He was a prominent pro-Belgian in the Belgian Revolution, serving in the Belgian national legislature, before entering the Chamber of Deputies of Luxembourg, of which he was the first President, from 1848 to 1853.

Charles was born in Luxembourg City in 1799 to Jean Metz and Anne-Marie-Justine Gérard. He studied at the Athénée de Luxembourg and the lycée in Metz, France, before reading law at the newly established University of Liège, graduating in 1822. Metz first became politically active as a pro-Belgian spokesperson during the Belgian Revolution. In the National Congress called in Brussels, Metz was one of sixteen deputies representing the arrondissement of Luxembourg (claimed in its entirety by Belgium). In 1836, Metz moved to Arlon, where he established a newspaper, L'Echo de Luxembourg, to promote Luxembourgish and liberal interests, along with Emmanuel Servais and Victor Tesch.

In 1837, Metz was elected to the Chamber of Representatives, representing Grevenmacher until 1841. He urged the Belgians to enter negotiations with the Netherlands, but spoke against the Third Partition of Luxembourg, ultimately voting against the Treaty of London. In 1839, he stood for election to the Chamber of Representatives for Bastogne, but lost, remaining as representative of now-partitioned Grevenmacher.

Metz, along with his younger brothers Auguste and Norbert, established the steel company Auguste Metz & Cie in 1838, but he played little active role in its operations. Metz was allowed to return to the (smaller) Grand Duchy of Luxembourg to practise law in 1842. With the collapse of the Orangist Journal de la Ville et du Pays Luxembourg in 1844, Metz went about establishing the new Courrier de Luxembourg, along with his brother Norbert and other leading liberals, as well as the conservative Orangist Mathieu-Lambert Schrobilgen, with whom the ideological split became more and more apparent over time.

During 1848, Metz was elected to the Constituent Assembly, being elected to represent the cantons of Esch and Luxembourg, but opting to represent the latter. The Metz brothers narrowly failed to defer Luxembourg sending a delegation from Luxembourg to the Frankfurt Parliament, although their position cost them their potential part in the three-man delegation. The Metz brothers were elected to the inaugural Chamber of Deputies. Charles was elected the first President of the Chamber, which he remained until his death on 24 April 1853.

In Edmond de la Fontaine's 1848 satirical poem D’Vulleparlament am Grengewald, Metz was depicted as a crow, the president of the parliament of birds.

He married Justine Vannérus on 26 December 1827 in Diekirch. Vannérus died in 1849, by which time they had seven children, of whom three (Jules, Irma, and Léonie) survived to adulthood. Metz's only son, Jules, followed his father at the Courrier, and then into the Chamber of Deputies for Capellen. Léonie married the Jersey-born engineer Edmond Le Gallais.

== See also ==
- Metz family

== Footnotes ==
Political offices
New creation First Chamber of Deputies	President of the Chamber of Deputies; 1848–1853	Succeeded by Théodore Pescatore
