= Torri Metz =

American obstetrician and researcher

- Education: University of Colorado; University of Utah
- Known for: Adverse effects of marijuana on pregnancy COVID-19 and pregnancy outcomes
- Awards: ACOG District VIII Mentor of the Year Award
- Scientific career
- Fields: Maternal-fetal medicine Obstetrics and gynecology Marijuana
- Workplaces: University of Colorado; Denver Health; University of Utah

Torri Metz is an American obstetrician and high-risk pregnancy researcher at the University of Utah Health. Metz is an associate professor of maternal-fetal medicine and is the vice chair of research in obstetrics and gynecology at the University of Utah. Metz is known for her research exploring the effects of marijuana on pregnancy outcomes.

== Early life and education ==
Metz attended the University of Colorado Boulder for her undergraduate degree in chemistry. Metz stayed at the University of Colorado for medical school. Metz was inspired to pursue obstetrics and gynecology after a rotation with an obstetrician in medical school. She completed her residency in obstetrics and gynecology at the University of Colorado in Denver. Metz then moved to Salt Lake City, Utah to pursue a fellowship in maternal-fetal medicine at the University of Utah Health. During this time, she also completed a Master of Science degree in clinical investigation.

== Career and research ==
Following her fellowship, Metz returned to the University of Colorado as an assistant professor of maternal-fetal medicine and worked at both Denver Health and the University of Colorado Hospital. In 2018, Metz was recruited to the University of Utah Health where she became an associate professor of obstetrics and gynecology. In 2022, she was selected as the Vice Chair of Research at the University of Utah Health. Metz also is the director and principal investigator of the ELEVATE Maternal Health Research Center of Excellence which aims to address maternal health disparities especially among rural and Native American women.

=== Marijuana use in pregnancy ===
Metz has dedicated much of her research career to exploring the effects of marijuana on adverse birth outcomes. In 2018, Metz and her colleagues found that dispensary employees in Colorado were recommending cannabis products to pregnant women, even stating that they are safe to use, against the recommendation of the American College of Obstetricians and Gynecologists. This finding was important for physicians to know how and where patients might be getting misinformation regarding cannabis products and their use in pregnancy.

Following this work, Metz found that marijuana use in pregnancy is harmful both to the birthing patient and the newborn. Her work, published in JAMA in 2023, showed that continued marijuana use throughout pregnancy increases the risk of low birth weight. Marijuana use is also associated with an increased risk of hypertensive disorders of pregnancy in the birthing patient such as pre-eclampsia.

=== COVID-19 in pregnancy ===
Metz has also conducted research on the effects of the COVID-19 pandemic on pregnant people. Metz has found that pregnant women who contract COVID-19 are at a significantly higher risk of mortality and of highly morbid conditions such as postpartum hemorrhage and severely elevated blood pressure. Her work highlighted the risks pregnant women face, especially if unvaccinated and exposed to COVID-19. Her research also found that pregnant women with COVID-19 have higher rates of C-section, prematurity, and stillbirth.

== Awards and honors ==
- Elected "Deputy Editor for Journal of Obstetrics and Gynecology"
- ACOG District VIII Mentor of the Year Award
- National CREOG Award for Excellence in Resident Education

== Select publications ==
- Metz, TD; Allshouse, AA; Hogue, CJ; Goldenberg, RL; Dudley, DJ; Varner, MW; Conway, DL; Saade, GR; Silver, RM (2017). "Maternal marijuana use, adverse pregnancy outcomes, and neonatal morbidity". Am J Obstet Gynecol. 217: 478.e1-478.e8. doi:10.1016/j.ajog.2017.05.050. PMC 5614818. PMID 28578174.
- Dickson, B; Mansfield, C; Guiahi, M; Allshouse, AA; Borgelt, LM; Sheeder, J; Silver, RM; Metz, TD (2018). "Recommendations From Cannabis Dispensaries About First-Trimester Cannabis Use". Obstet Gynecol. 131: 1031–1038. doi:10.1097/AOG.0000000000002619. PMC 5970054. PMID 29742676.
- Metz, TD; Clifton, RG; Hughes, BL; Sandoval, GJ; Grobman, WA; Saade, GR; Manuck, TA; Longo, M; Sowles, A; Clark, K; Simhan, HN; Rouse, DJ; Mendez-Figueroa, H; Gyamfi-Bannerman, C; Bailit, JL; Costantine, MM; Sehdev, HM; Tita, ATN; Macones, GA (2022). "Association of SARS-CoV-2 Infection With Serious Maternal Morbidity and Mortality From Obstetric Complications". JAMA. 327: 748–759. doi:10.1001/jama.2022.1190. PMC 8822445. PMID 35129581.
- Metz, TD; Allshouse, AA; McMillin, GA; Greene, T; Chung, JH; Grobman, WA; Haas, DM; Mercer, BM; Parry, S; Reddy, UM; Saade, GR; Simhan, HN; Silver, RM (2023). "Cannabis Exposure and Adverse Pregnancy Outcomes Related to Placental Function". JAMA. 330: 2191–2199. doi:10.1001/jama.2023.21146. PMC 10716715. PMID 38085313.
