= Maryland Enterprise Zone =

Maryland special commercial area

A Maryland Enterprise Zone (MEZ) is a specially zoned commercial area in the state of Maryland where businesses are eligible for income tax credits and real property tax credits in return for job creation and investments made in the zone.

== See also ==
- Urban Enterprise Zone
