= Émile Metz =

Luxembourgish politician, industrialist and engineer (1835–1904)

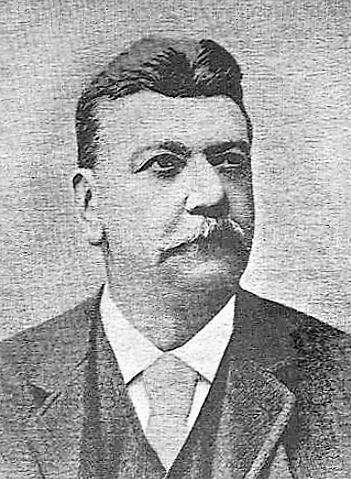
Émile Metz (1835-1904)

Émile Metz (23 February 1835 - 13 February 1904) was a Luxembourgish politician, industrialist and engineer. He was the eldest son of Norbert Metz.

Born in Eich in 1835, he studied engineering in Paris, then proceeded to work for Waring Brothers, who built railway lines.

After this, he started working in his father's business, Metz & Cie. At the suggestion of Jean Meyer, who was head of research at Metz & Cie, Émile Metz managed to convince his father to buy the rights to the Thomas-Gilchrist procedure for dephosophorising Minette (low-quality iron ore found in the south of Luxembourg).

Émile Metz became manager of the Dudelange foundry, the S.A. des Hauts Fournaux et Forges de Dudelange, which was established in 1881 to produce steel exclusively using the new method. In 1885, after his father's death, Metz became manager of the Société Metz & Cie.

Metz was also active in politics: from 1874 to 1888, he was mayor of the commune of Eich, and from 1885 to 1899 he represented the canton of Capellen in the Chamber of Deputies.

In 1895 after his cousin Edouard Metz's death, he became president of the chamber of commerce. This he remained until 1904.

In 1896, he had a villa built for himself, which today houses the Russian Embassy in Luxembourg.

Émile Metz died in 1904 in Heidelberg. He married Edmée Tesch, the daughter of Victor Tesch, an associate of his father. After his death, his widow established a foundation, which created the Institut Emile Metz in 1913, now the Lycée technique privé Émile-Metz. In its courtyard is a monument giving thanks to "Madame Émile Metz-Tesch".
