= Norbert Metz =

Luxembourgish politician and engineer (1811–1885)

Jean-Joseph Norbert Metz (2 February 1811 – 28 November 1885) was a Luxembourgish politician and engineer. With his two brothers, members of the powerful Metz family, Charles and Auguste, Metz defined political and economic life in Luxembourg in the mid-nineteenth century.

Metz was one of the leading 'quarante huitards': the radical liberals responsible for the promulgation of Luxembourg's constitution in 1848. He was appointed by the King to the Assembly of the States in 1842, representing the canton of Capellen. He was then elected to represent Capellen on the Constituent Assembly, in 1848. Pro-Belgian and anti-German Confederation, after the first elections, Metz was appointed Administrator-General for Finances and Administrator-General for Military Affairs.

On 21 May 1834, he married the 21-year-old Marie-Barbe-Philippe-Eugénie Tesch, who had three children before dying on 29 January 1845. He remarried to Tesch's eighteen-year-old cousin, Marie-Suzanne-Albertine Tesch on 7 November 1850.

One of his children was Émile Metz.

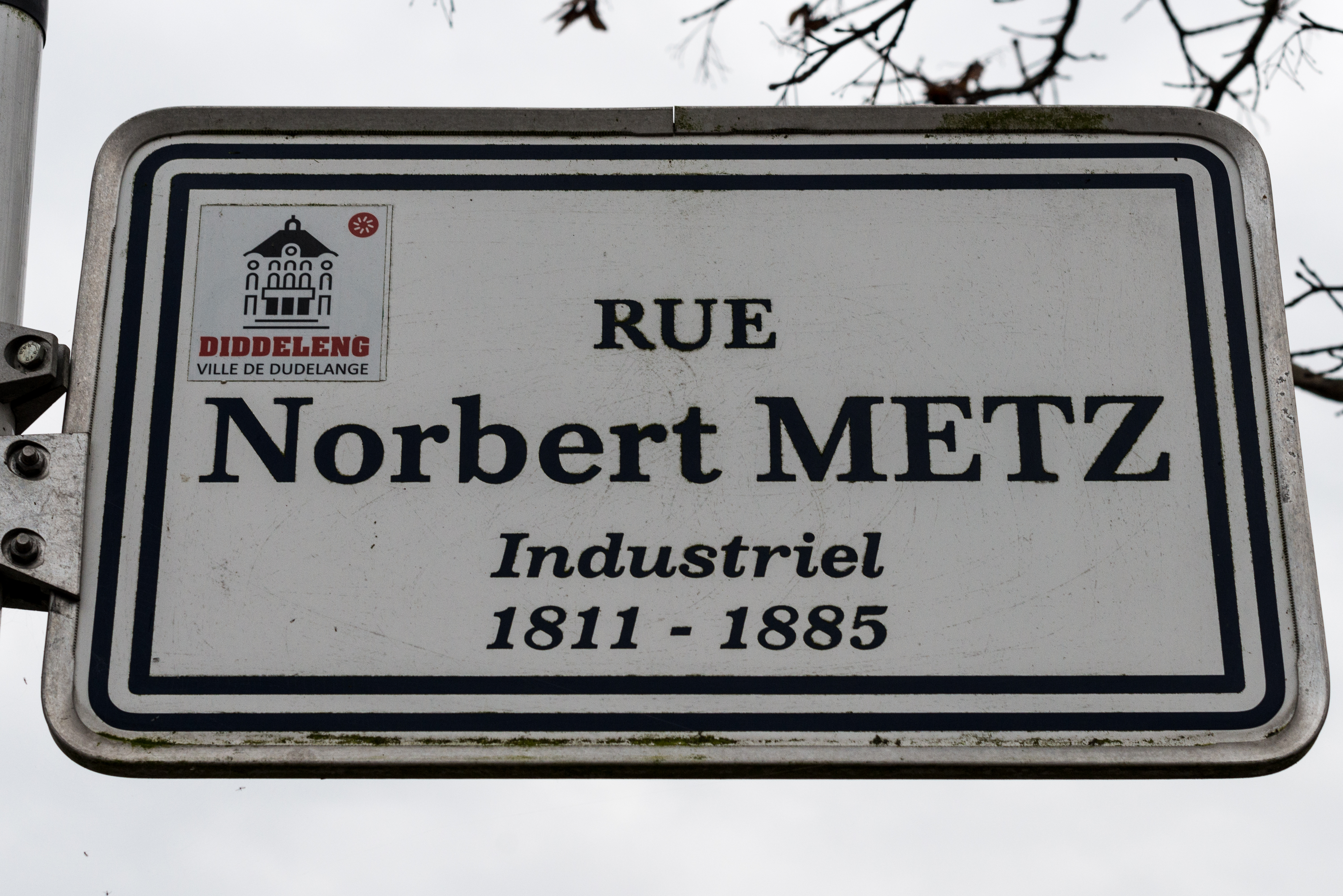
Rue Norbert Metz in Dudelange

== Industrialist ==
When his two brothers died within a short period of time (Charles in 1853 and Auguste in 1854), Norbert Metz withdrew from politics, to devote himself entirely to his business activities:

Norbert Metz's activities were diverse:

- He was a miller, and in 1837 was head of the mill consortium of the Société d'Industrie.
- In Arlon, he owned part of a tobacco factory.
- He additionally had links to construction businesses.
- With his brother, Auguste, he founded and managed the Berbourg foundry from 1837 .
- In 1843 Auguste Metz received authorisation to process iron ore. However, it was not until 1847 that the minette (low-quality ore) of Esch was used in the coke furnaces of their Eich foundry (Forges d'Eich).
- Henry Bessemer's invention made possible the boom in the steelworking business of Auguste and Norbert Metz.
- In 1871, the Metz foundry (later Arbed Esch-Schifflange) was founded.
- Through a merger with the other foundries, in 1911 ARBED was founded, after Norbert Metz's death.

Additionally, through the Fondation Norbert Metz, he and his family contributed much to the establishment of the Eich hospital.

== Footnotes ==
Political offices
Preceded by Jean Ulveling	Administrator-General for Finances; 1848 – 1853	Succeeded by Emmanuel Servais
Preceded by Baron de Tornaco	President of the Chamber of Deputies; 1860 – 1861	Succeeded by Théodore Pescatore
