= Steven Metz =

American author and professor

Steven Kent Metz (born June 30, 1956 in Charleston, West Virginia) is an American author and former professor of national security and strategy at the U.S. Army War College specializing in insurgency and counterinsurgency, American defense policy, strategic theory, the African security environment, and future warfare. He is currently an Adjunct Fellow in the Military Studies Program at S. Rajaratnam School of International Studies.

From 1993 to 2020 he was with the U.S. Army War College Strategic Studies Institute (SSI) serving as Senior Research Professor, Henry L. Stimson Professor of Military Studies, Director of Research, Chairman of the Regional Strategy Department, Research Director for the Joint Strategic Landpower Task Force, Director of the Future of American Strategy Project, Project Director for the Army Iraq Stabilization Strategic Assessment, Director of the Strategic Studies Institute and Defense Threat Reduction Agency's Future Landpower Environment Project, and Co-Organizer of the Harvard-U.S. Army War College Symposia on Security Transformation.

Metz has also been on the faculty of the U.S. Air War College, the U.S. Army Command and General Staff College, and several universities. He has been an advisor to government agencies, political organizations, campaigns and commissions; served on many national security policy task forces; testified in both houses of Congress; and spoken on military and security issues around the world. He is the author of more than 400 publications and is frequently interviewed by print, television and radio media. He was a member of the blue ribbon advisory panel for the Secretary of Defense Strategic Portfolio Review for Close Combat Capabilities; the RAND Insurgency Board; the Board of Advisors for the U.S. Army history of Operation Iraqi Freedom; the Senior Advisory Panel on Special Forces—Conventional Forces Interdependence; the Atlantic Council's Defense Austerity Task Force; the Central Intelligence Agency's External Advisory Panel for the Iraq Working Group; the Board of Advisers for the American Enterprise Institute's Defense Review; the Center for Strategic and International Studies' Defense Reform For a New Era Task Force; and the Lexington Institute's Grading Government Performance on Homeland Security Task Force. He formerly served a Nonresident Scholar at the Quincy Institute For Responsible Statecraft and Adjunct Scholar at the U.S. Military Academy's Modern War Institute. From 2012 to 2019 he wrote a weekly column on defense and security issues for World Politics Review .

== Works ==
Metz's articles have appeared in journals such as Washington Quarterly, Joint Force Quarterly, The National Interest, and Current History as well as a number of edited books. His major publications include:

- To Deter China, Think Big
- Not Your Grandfather's Counterinsurgency
- How to Think About Counterinsurgency After Afghanistan
- The Future of Strategic Leadership
- Globalization and American Security After the Coronavirus Crisis
- Future Warfare: The Two Dimensional Security Challenge
- Why The ISIS Threat Is As Old As Cold War Bunk
- Decisionmaking in Operation IRAQI FREEDOM: The Strategic Shift of 2007
- Decisionmaking in Operation IRAQI FREEDOM: Removing Saddam Hussein by Force
- Unruly Clients: The Trouble with Allies
- New Challenges and Old Concepts: Understanding 21st Century Insurgency
- Restructuring America’s Ground Forces: Better, Not Bigger
- Rethinking Insurgency
- Strategies for Asymmetric Threats to US National Security
- Learning from Iraq: Counterinsurgency in American Strategy
- Insurgency and Counterinsurgency in the 21st Century ;
- Future War/Future Battlespace;
- Asymmetry and U.S. Military Strategy;
- Armed Conflict in the 21st Century;
- "Insurgency and Counterinsurgency in Iraq"; ;
- La guerre asymétrique et l'avenir de l'Occident;
- The Psychology of War ;
- Mission Creep Dispatch ;
- Insurgency in Iraq and Afghanistan ;
- The Civilian Surge Myth
- How Obama's Surge Is Like Bush's

Metz is the author of Iraq and the Evolution of American Strategy.

== Concepts ==
Metz has proposed several new concepts for the analysis of military strategy and national security policy:

- Psychological precision: the idea that modern militaries should be designed so that their operations attain desired psychological effects rather than simply hitting targets with precision. This concept was discussed in the 2001 "Year in Ideas" essay in the New York Times
- Effects based planning for counterinsurgency: the idea that counterinsurgency planning should be determined by an array of psychological effects
- Ethical asymmetry: the idea that normative differences between opponents in armed conflict is an important feature of 21st century warfare
- Cultural asymmetry and counterinsurgency: the idea that the United States' approach to counterinsurgency support only works in nations with Western or Western-derived cultures
- Personal versus strategic motives in insurgency: the idea that insurgencies where strategic motives—those directed toward a desired political outcome—dominate differ in significant ways from ones where personal motives—the desire for revenge, prestige, or material gain—drive most insurgents.
- New technological revolution for counterinsurgency: the idea that technology can, to some extent, substitute for labor in counterinsurgency, but not simply through the application of technology developed for conventional warfighting. A technological revolution for counterinsurgency (and other forms of asymmetric and irregular conflict) should be based on robotics (including micro- and nano-robotics), nonlethality, and psychotechnology.
- "Metz threshold": counterinsurgency must achieve acceptable performance before political patience runs out, requiring an organizational learning response and the historical U.S. threshold for political patience is three years
- Next-gen insurgency: future insurgency, unlike the guerrilla conflicts of past insurgencies, will be networked, swarming, global, and focused on narrative-centric conflict and integrated cost imposition. Social media and the virtual world will be its central battlespaces.

== Education ==
Metz graduated from Myrtle Beach High School, Myrtle Beach, SC and holds a BA in philosophy and MA in International Studies from the University of South Carolina; and a Ph.D. in Political Science from the Johns Hopkins University
