= Auguste Metz =

Luxembourgish entrepreneur, politician and lawyer (1812–1854)

Jean-Antoine Auguste Metz
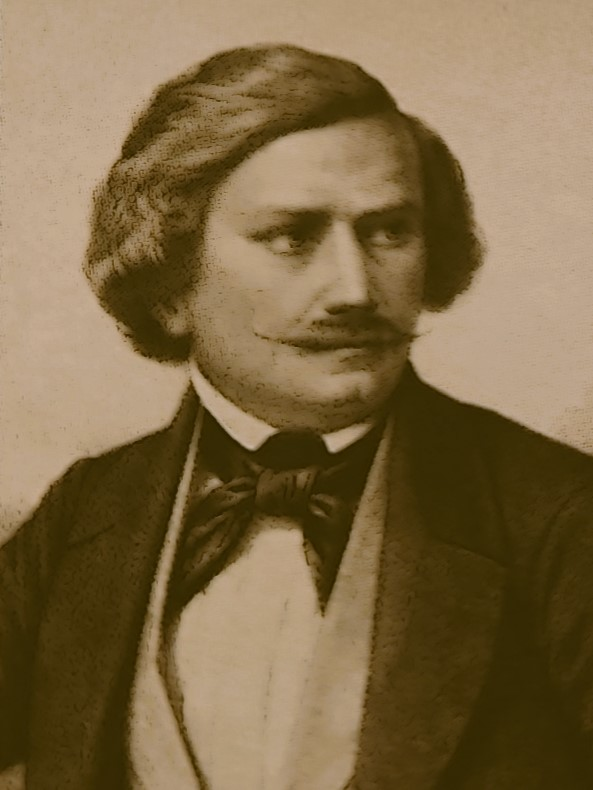

Member of the Chamber of Deputies for Grevenmacher
- In office 1848–1854

Personal details
- Born: 8 August 1812 Luxembourg City
- Died: 22 June 1854 (aged 41) Eich
- Spouse: Petronille Laeis (m. 1841)
- Children: Léon Metz; 3 others
- Occupation: Entrepreneur (steel)

Jean-Antoine Auguste Metz (8 August 1812 – 22 June 1854) was a Luxembourgish entrepreneur, politician, and lawyer. He was a major player in the growing steel industry in Luxembourg during the nineteenth century, as well as a leading liberal member of the Chamber of Deputies, along with his brothers.

Born in Luxembourg City as the youngest of nine children of Jean Metz, Auguste Metz attended the Athénée de Luxembourg, before leaving to study law at the University of Paris in 1833. He gained his licence to practice law in France, but returned to Luxembourg, where he became involved in the steel industry. In 1837, Metz and his brothers Charles and Norbert, were given a ten-year lease of the steel mill at Berbourg. They formed a company, Auguste Metz & Cie, along with Théodore Pescatore, for the purpose of expanding and redeveloping the site. The company expanded, taking over foundries at Grundhof, in the Red Lands, at Eich, and at Fischbach.

He first became involved in politics through his opposition to the Third Partition of Luxembourg in 1839. In 1848, Metz sat on Luxembourg's Constituent Assembly, and then the first Chamber of Deputies, elected in 1848 to represent Grevenmacher. He was targeted in the 1854 election by the Simons government. He would not live to see the assembly of the new Chamber of Deputies, however, as he died in Eich just eight days after the election, having fallen ill inspecting the foundry at Berbourg, exacerbated by tonsillitis.

He married Petronille Laeis on 17 August 1841. They had four children, including Léon Metz, who became a member of the Chamber of Deputies for forty-three years and Mayor of Esch-sur-Alzette for three years.

== See also ==
- Metz family
