= Martin Metz =

German politician (born 1983)

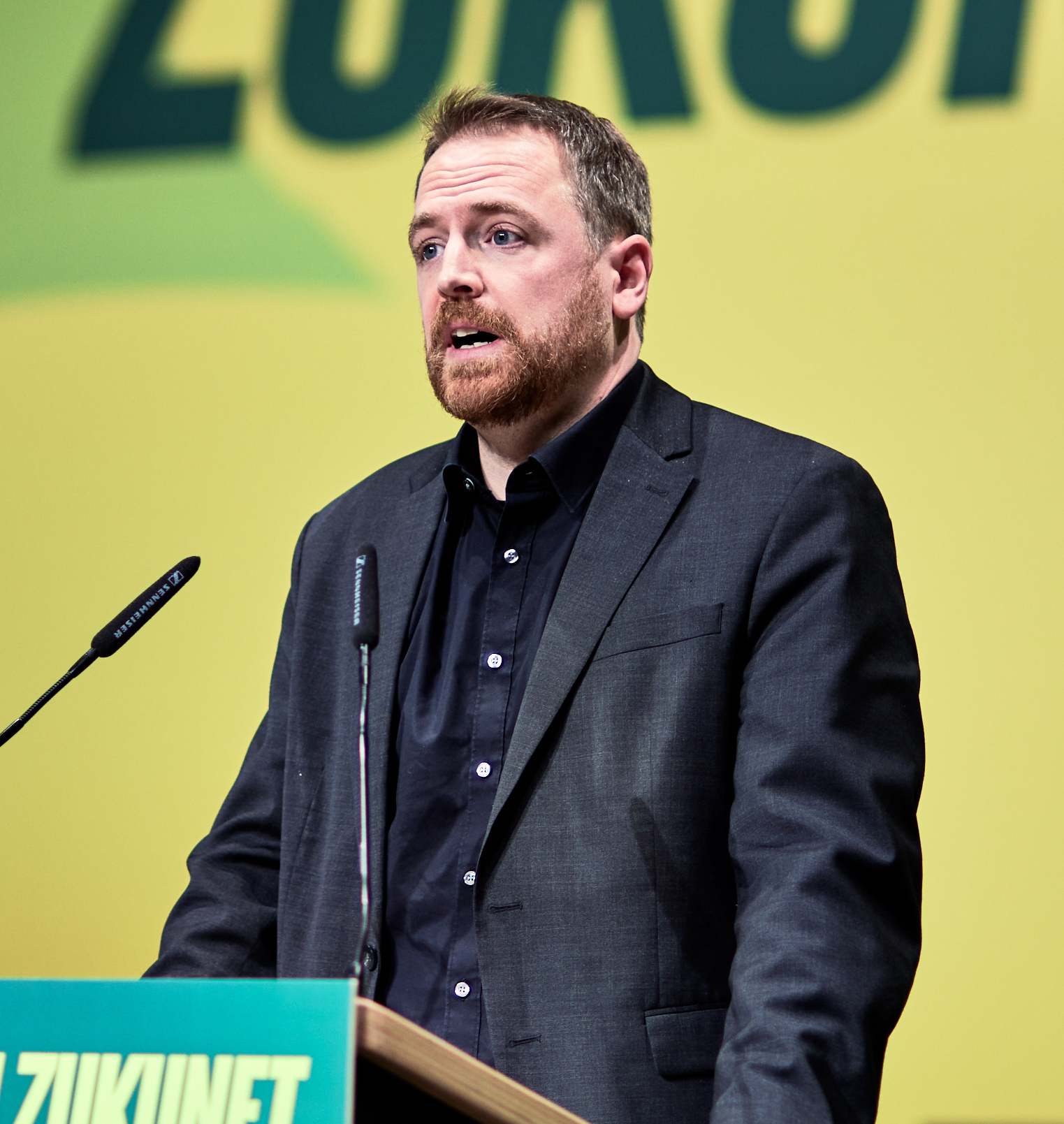
- Metz in 2021

Member of the Landtag of North Rhine-Westphalia
- Incumbent
- Assumed office 1 June 2022

Personal details
- Born: 1983 (age 42–43)
- Party: Alliance 90/The Greens (since 1999)

Martin Metz (born 1983) is a German politician serving as a member of the Landtag of North Rhine-Westphalia since 2022. From 2016 to 2021, he served as spokesperson of Alliance 90/The Greens in the Rhein-Sieg-Kreis.
