= Contern =

Contern Conter (Luxembourgish)
- Commune
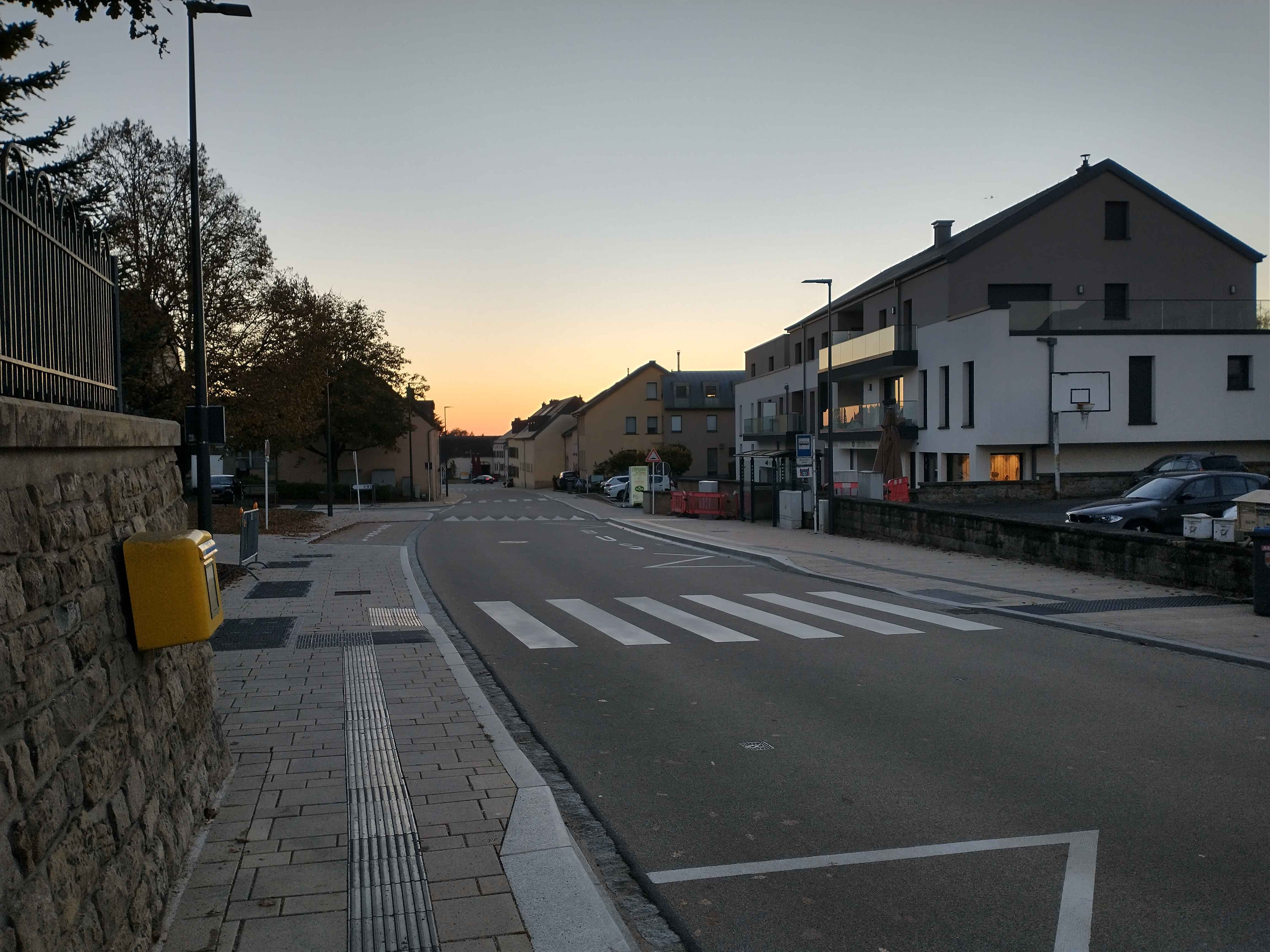
- Town centre of Contern

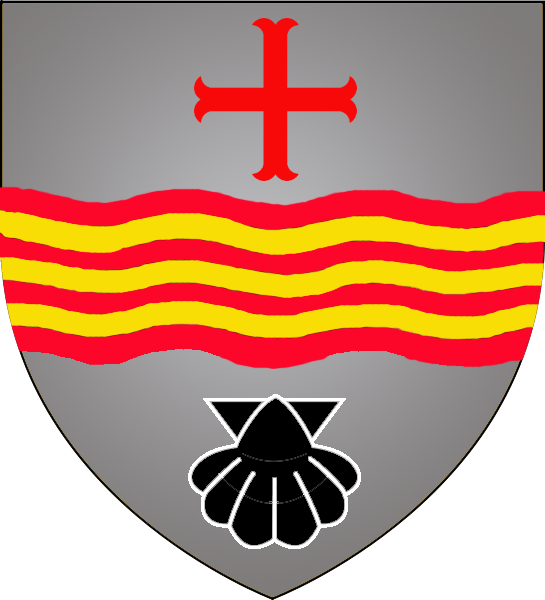
- Coat of arms

- Map of Luxembourg with Contern highlighted in orange, and the canton in dark red
- Coordinates: 49°35′04″N 6°13′33″E
- Country: Luxembourg
- Canton: Luxembourg
- First Settlement built: approx. 2nd century

Government
  - Mayor: Dali Zhu (DP)

Area
  - Total: 20.55 km^{2} (7.93 sq mi)
  - Land: 20.55 km^{2} (7.93 sq mi)
  - Rank: 54th of 100
- Highest elevation: 356 m (1,168 ft)
  - Rank: 81st of 100
- Lowest elevation: 237 m (778 ft)
  - Rank: 45th of 100

Population (2025)
  - Total: 4,716
  - Rank: 41st of 100
  - Density: 229.5/km^{2} (594.4/sq mi)
  - Rank: 35th of 100
- Time zone: UTC+1 (CET)
  - Summer (DST): UTC+2 (CEST)
- LAU 2: LU0000302
- Website: contern.lu

Contern (German pronunciation: [ˈkɔntɐn]; Luxembourgish: Conter [ˈkontɐ]) is a commune and town in southern Luxembourg. It is located east of Luxembourg City. As of 2025 the commune has a population of 4,513 whereas the town itself, which lies in the south-west of the commune, has a population of 2,123.

The main towns are Contern, Moutfort and Oetrange and there are two small villages, Medingen and Milbech. Additionally the commune contains the lieux-dits of Bricherhaff, Brichermillen, Kréintgeshaff, Kackerterhaff (which means "cockerel farm" in Luxembourgish), Éitermillen, Marxeknupp and Pleitrange. The commune also contains the industrial zones of Chaux de Contern, and Rosswenkel, as well as the activity zone of Weiergewan.

The town dates back to around the 9th century and was initially economically focused on farming. Having gone through various changes in governance over the centuries, the commune as it exists today was formed around the 19th century. In recent years Contern has industrialised; however, it mainly functions as a commuter town into Luxembourg City, as do most of the other settlements in the commune. As a result, Contern boasts the 10th highest median average salary out of all 100 communes in Luxembourg as of 2025.

== History ==
=== Early history ===
The Romans settled Luxembourg in the 1st century BC, it has been speculated whether or not the settlement of Contern was founded by them or even previously. This has not however been established despite the presence of remnants of Roman infrastructure within the boundaries of today's commune. They include a crossing over the Trudlerbaach, part of the Roman road linking Luxembourg and Dalheim, with remnants of the road passing through the farmstead of Faerschthaff. In the commune, there are also remains of an ancient Roman aqueduct, a temple and a few Roman villas. Signs of Celtic habitation are significantly less clear. The name Contern first appeared in a charter from 879 AD, although its first official listing was by Pope Honorius II in 1128. In spite of this it is almost certain Contern dates back to the Celtic Era. In the 14th century it was recorded in writing as Guntrein. Contern in the 13th century was considerably influenced by Christianity and chivalry. At this time Contern became a parish which led to the construction of its church.

Contern was officially incorporated as a parish in 1621. In 1684, neighbouring Oetrange also became a parish followed by Moutfort in 1707. At the time, the parish of Contern had no lieux-dits although Oetrange was home to the settlement of Kackerterhaff. Moutfort included the settlements of Medingen and Milbech as well as Moulin de Milbech and the farmstead of Pleitrange. By 1796 Contern was incorporated as an Arrondissement of Luxembourg District, which encapsulated several localities:

Localities within the arrondissement of Contern c.1800
Locality (French)	Locality (German)	Locality (Luxembourgish)	Parish
Brücherhof	Brücherhof	Bricherhaff	None
Brüchermühle		Brichermillen	None
Contern	Contern	Conter or Konter	Contern
Contern-Barriére			None
Conterweyer			None
Kackerterhof		Kackerterhaff	Oetrange
Kroentgeshof or Croentgeshof	Kroentgeshof or Kröntgeshof	Kréintgeshaff	None
Marxeknupp		Marxeknupp	None
Medingen	Medingen	Méideng or Méidéng	Moutfort
Moutfort	Mutfort	Mutfert	Moutfort
Mühlbach	Mühlbach	Millbech or Milbech	Moutfort
Mühlbach-Moulin or Moulin de Millbech		Millbechermillen or Milbechermillen	Moutfort
Oetrange	Oetringen	Éiter	Oetrange
Oetrange-Moulin		Éitermillen	None
Pleitrange	Pleitringen	Pläitreng	Moutfort

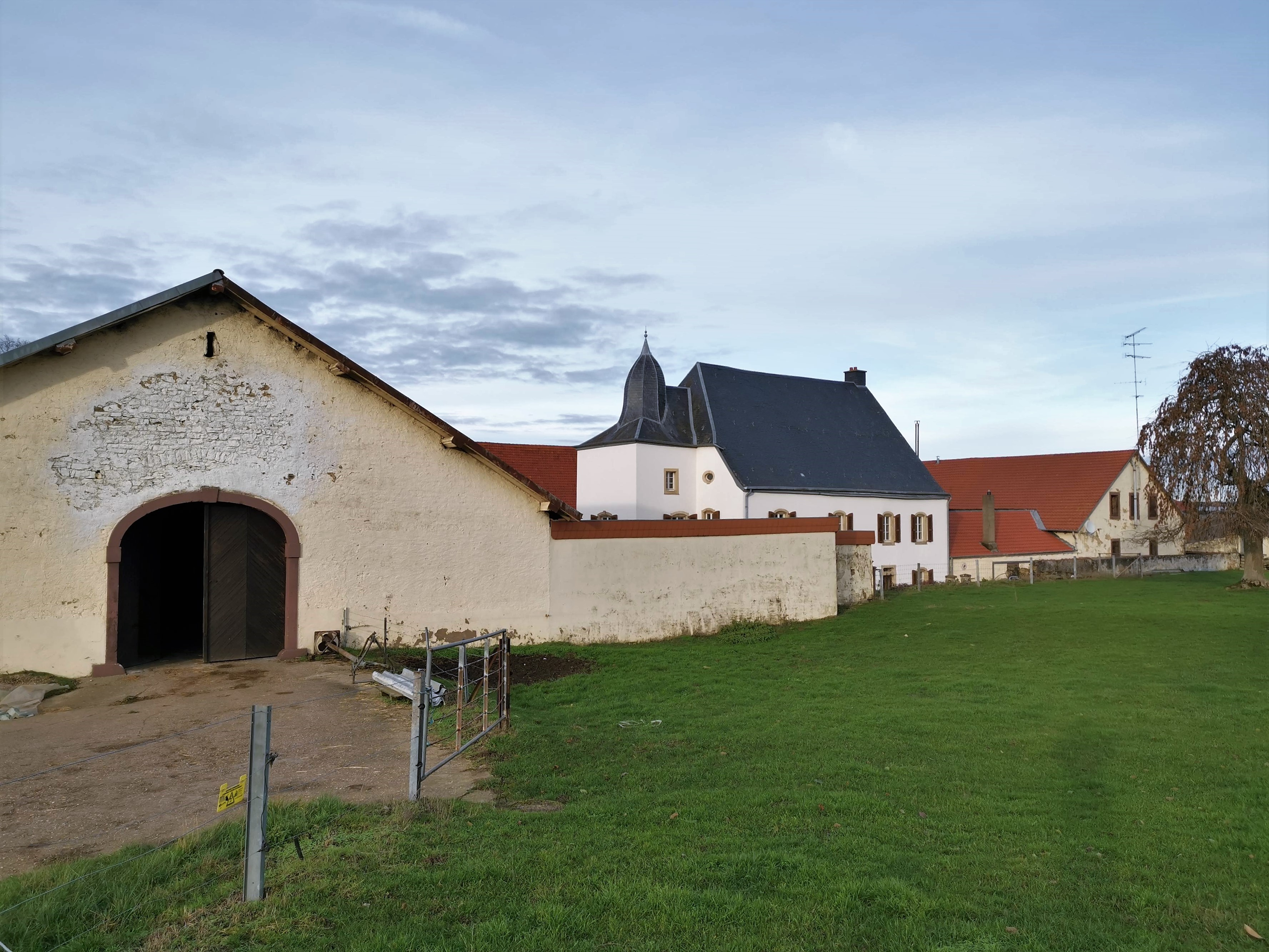
Historic buildings in Pleitrange

Contern remained an arrondissement until 1912. At some point in the early 19th Century, communes were introduced to Luxembourg which saw the foundation of the Commune. Precise details are unknown but the earliest census applicable to Contern with its current boundaries is from 1821 and the oldest officially archived reference to Contern as a commune dates back to 1816, which is the first occurrence of it being officially listed as a commune. The oldest mention of Contern in a newspaper dates back to 1842 ex By 1890 most of the former arrondissements of Contern were incorporated as lieux-dits and census subdivisions.

Population of all Villages and lieux-dits of Contern
Rank	Settlement	Parish	Population
1	Contern	Contern	356
2	Moutfort	Moutfort	328
3	Oetrange	Oetrange	253
4	Medingen	Moutfort	200
5	Muhlbach	Moutfort	28
6	Kroentgeshof	Contern	24
7	Barrièrehauser	Moutfort	16
8	Nehmuhl	Moutfort	13
9	Conterwieber	Contern	11
10	Oetrange Moulin	Oetrange	8
10	Brücherhof	Contern	8
12	Pleitrange	Moutfort	7
13	Brüchermuhl	Contern	6
14	Kackert	Oetrange	4

From 1945 onwards, Contern's municipal structure was made up of Contern, Oetrange, Moutfort and Medingen. The parish of Oetrange was absorbed into the parish of Moutfort in 1946. Shortly thereafter in 1948, the parishes of Contern and Moutfort were effectively dissolved.

=== 21st century ===
On November 8, 2000, Contern's municipal council passed a bill approving the sale of land in the Weiergewann and Scheid cadastral districts as well as modifying the building regulations in Weiergewann and formulated the plan regarding taxation and forestry use for the 2001 fiscal budget. The budget was later rectified on November 30 and also around that time Contern joined the Luxembourgish Climate Alliance (Klimabündnis-Lëtzebuerg) and Contern.lu was set up.

In December 2015, Sandweiler-Contern station was re-sited, moving the station within the boundaries of Contern.

In November 2023, the DuPont chemical plant located partially within Contern threatened to lay off a large portion of its staff.

In 2024, a small parking lot in the town centre beside the church cemetery was converted into a small pedestrianised square. In May, it was controversially announced that the square would be named "Place Luc Frieden" in the honour of the sitting prime minister of Luxembourg who has resided in the commune for 30 years. The CSV mayor of Contern, Marion Zovillé-Braquet, stated that the naming was by no means politics, while the commune’s DP councillors criticised that naming a square after a sitting prime minister was a "practice common in dictatorships" and that street names should generally be a "posthumous honour". The LSAP backed up the mayor amid the controversy, having already voted in favour of the name in the council meeting.

=== Archaeology ===
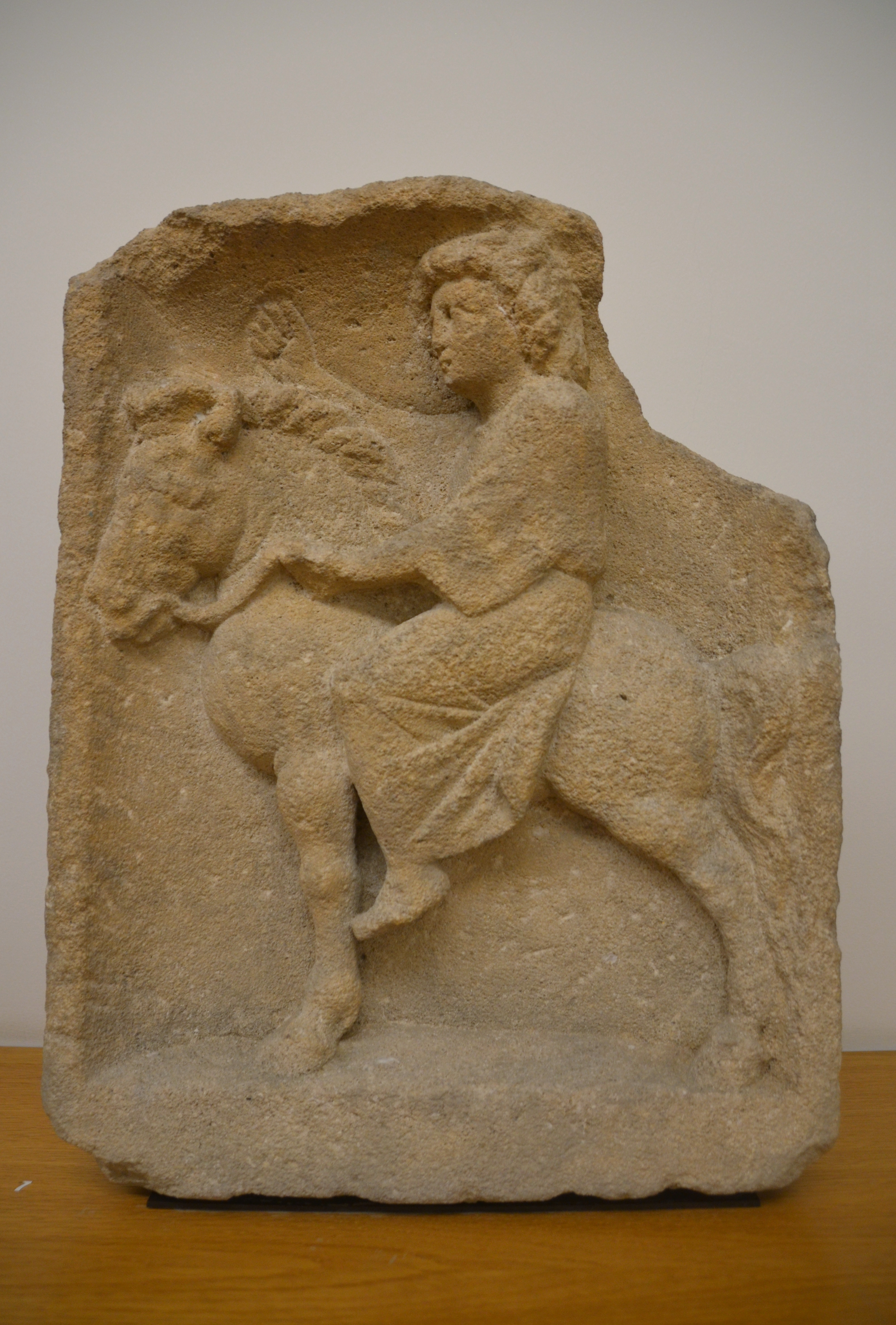
2nd-3rd Century depiction of Epona which was dug up in Contern

Although no prominent archaeological sites or artifacts date back to Celtic times, much remains from the Romans including some housing ruins and remnants of an aqueduct. Additionally a mosaic of the Roman god Epona was discovered in Contern. The most prominent item from the Romans however the Gallo-Roman villa which stood on the current site of the town. Its remains can be seen to this day.

=== Etymology ===
Following World War II, the Luxembourgers had strong distaste for their former German overseers. This was why almost every place in the country was renamed from its original Luxembourgish name of German origin, to that of French origin without changing too much. Contern's name would have stayed Conter if it weren't for the French pronunciation of "er" being far too strong. An "n" was therefore added. It could have been possible to have followed what places like Hesperange did, but in the end it stuck to the name Contern. In the modern era, to encourage more Luxembougish in the commune, many documents and signs use "Conter" instead of Contern.

== Geography ==
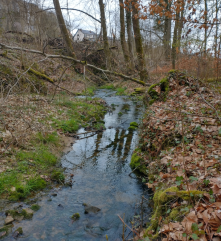
The Kackeschbaach makes up a part of the border between Contern and Schuttrange

Contern is located within the Canton of Luxembourg, in the former District of Luxembourg.

=== Boundaries ===
Contern is bordered by the communes of Sandweiler and Schuttrange to the north, Lenningen and Bous-Waldbredimus to the east, Dalheim to the south, Weiler-la-Tour to the southwest and Hesperange to the west. In general, the borders of Contern are not defined by any major roads of rivers but there are exceptions. Between Eitermillen and the border with Sandweiler, the Kackeshbaach marks the border between Contern and Schuttrange. Between Syren and Brichemillen, the River Syre marks the border with Weiler-La-Tour and east of the Contern-Sandweiler industrial zone, the Réimeschbaach marks the border with Hesperange.

=== Topography ===
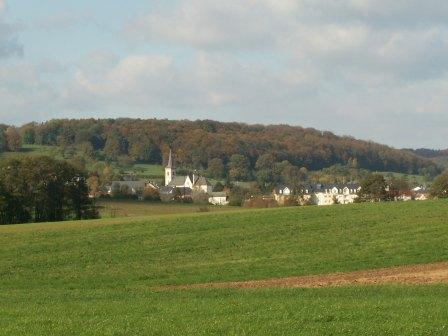
Typical topography of Contern containing rolling hills, taken from the east of Oetrange

Contern covers an area of 20.55 square kilometres, making it, as of 2022, the 54th largest commune in Luxembourg out of 102. It had a population of 4374, the 44th highest out of 102 communes as of 2023 giving it a population density of 210 people per square kilometre, 43rd highest in Luxembourg. The population has since risen to 4,513 inhabitants.

Contern lies within the Guttland region of Luxembourg and covers part of both the Luxembourg Plateau and Moselle Valley sub-regions. The contrast between the two sub regions gives Contern a varying topography, from the rolling hills in the south and west to the sharp sandstone cliffs to the east around Medingen and the north around Kréintgeshaff and Éiterbierg.

Contern is largely centred around the River Syre, which nearly perfectly bisects the commune, and to a lesser extent, its tributaries. The Syre flows north-east from Syren in the commune of Weiler-la-Tour continuing up to the border with Schuttrange halfway between Oetrange and Schrassig. Whilst flowing through the commune, it directly bisects both Moutfort and Oetrange and the lieux-dits of Bricherhaff and Brichermillen. There is one tributary of the Syre which directly hosts a settlement, the Kackeschbaach with Eitermillen. The remaining settlements are located atop hills including Contern itself.

The Highest point in Contern is Éiterbierg (Oetrange Hill) at an elevation of 356 metres, while the lowest point is at the river Syre, on the northern border with Schuttrange, at an elevation of 237 metres.

=== Climate ===
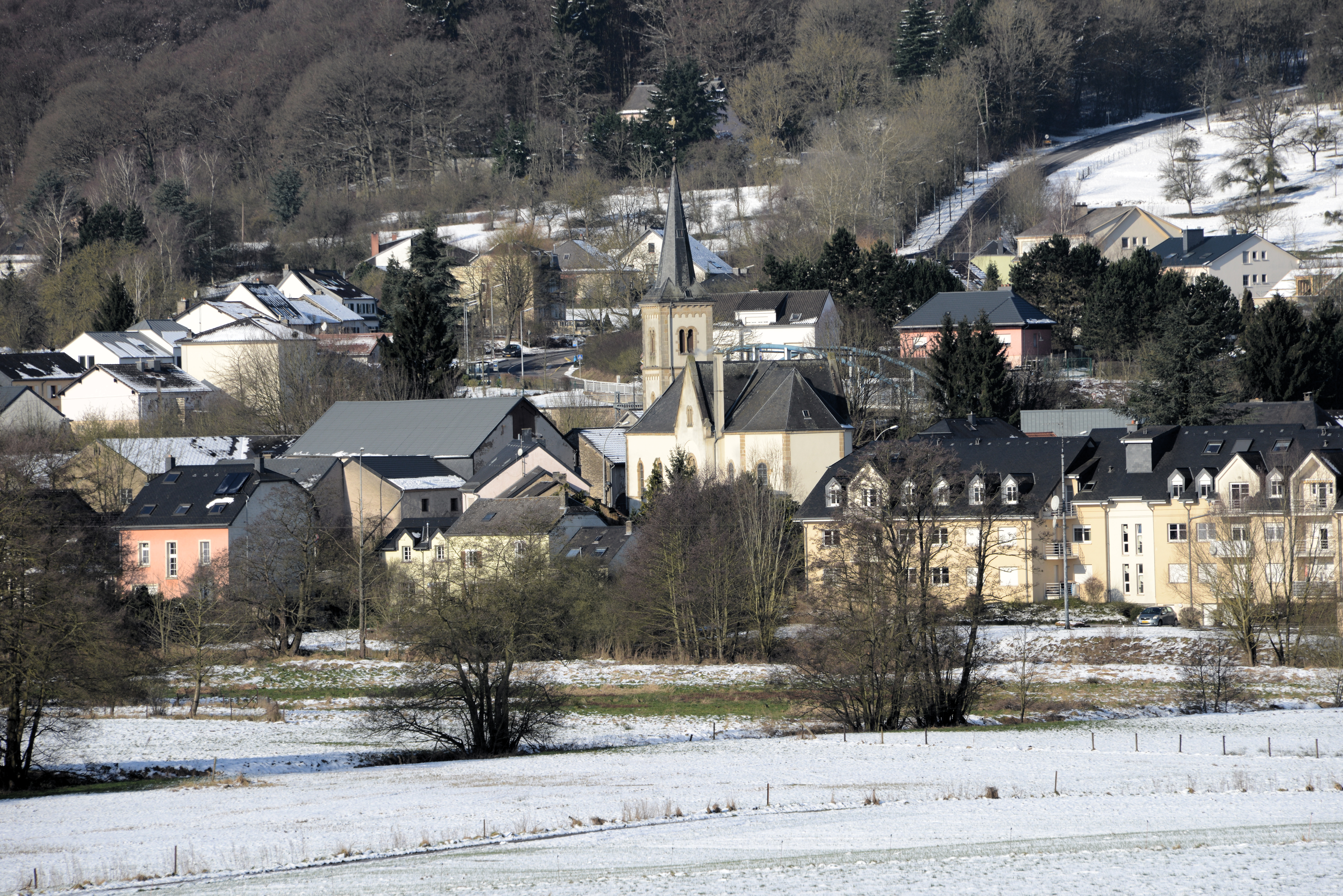
Snow in Oetrange

The nearest place to survey the climate is in Luxembourg City, however temperatures likely differ slightly due to the urban heat island effect present in Luxembourg City, which is not felt to the same extent in Contern. Contern has an oceanic climate (Cfb), with moderate precipitation, cold to cool winters and warm summers. It is cloudy about two-thirds of the year.

Climate data for Luxembourg City (1991–2020, extremes 1947–present)
Month	Jan	Feb	Mar	Apr	May	Jun	Jul	Aug	Sep	Oct	Nov	Dec	Year
Record high °C (°F)	13.9 (57.0)	19.8 (67.6)	23.5 (74.3)	27.9 (82.2)	31.6 (88.9)	35.4 (95.7)	39.0 (102.2)	37.9 (100.2)	31.5 (88.7)	26.0 (78.8)	19.8 (67.6)	14.7 (58.5)	39.0 (102.2)
Mean maximum °C (°F)	10.7 (51.3)	12.2 (54.0)	17.4 (63.3)	22.9 (73.2)	26.6 (79.9)	30.1 (86.2)	31.9 (89.4)	31.5 (88.7)	25.6 (78.1)	20.9 (69.6)	14.6 (58.3)	10.8 (51.4)	33.5 (92.3)
Mean daily maximum °C (°F)	3.8 (38.8)	5.2 (41.4)	9.8 (49.6)	14.4 (57.9)	18.4 (65.1)	21.7 (71.1)	23.9 (75.0)	23.5 (74.3)	19.0 (66.2)	13.5 (56.3)	7.7 (45.9)	4.5 (40.1)	13.8 (56.8)
Daily mean °C (°F)	1.4 (34.5)	2.2 (36.0)	5.7 (42.3)	9.6 (49.3)	13.5 (56.3)	16.7 (62.1)	18.7 (65.7)	18.4 (65.1)	14.3 (57.7)	9.9 (49.8)	5.2 (41.4)	2.3 (36.1)	9.8 (49.6)
Mean daily minimum °C (°F)	−1.0 (30.2)	−0.7 (30.7)	2.0 (35.6)	5.1 (41.2)	8.7 (47.7)	11.8 (53.2)	13.8 (56.8)	13.6 (56.5)	10.3 (50.5)	6.6 (43.9)	2.8 (37.0)	0.0 (32.0)	6.1 (43.0)
Mean minimum °C (°F)	−8.0 (17.6)	−7.5 (18.5)	−4.2 (24.4)	−1.1 (30.0)	2.8 (37.0)	6.0 (42.8)	9.1 (48.4)	8.3 (46.9)	5.5 (41.9)	0.7 (33.3)	−2.9 (26.8)	−6.5 (20.3)	−10.4 (13.3)
Record low °C (°F)	−17.8 (0.0)	−20.2 (−4.4)	−14.4 (6.1)	−6.9 (19.6)	−2.1 (28.2)	0.9 (33.6)	4.5 (40.1)	4.3 (39.7)	−0.7 (30.7)	−4.6 (23.7)	−11.1 (12.0)	−15.3 (4.5)	−20.2 (−4.4)
Average precipitation mm (inches)	72.0 (2.83)	59.0 (2.32)	57.0 (2.24)	49.0 (1.93)	71.2 (2.80)	75.6 (2.98)	71.5 (2.81)	71.9 (2.83)	66.2 (2.61)	76.6 (3.02)	72.1 (2.84)	89.4 (3.52)	831.5 (32.74)
Average precipitation days (≥ 0.1 mm)	17.3	15.4	14.8	12.7	14.0	13.3	13.7	13.2	12.2	15.2	17.5	18.1	177.4
Average snowy days	7.5	7.6	3.6	1.5	0.0	0.0	0.0	0.0	0.0	0.1	2.3	6.8	29.4
Average relative humidity (%)	88	83	74	67	68	68	67	68	75	84	89	90	77
Mean monthly sunshine hours	52.0	79.5	137.1	197.5	226.3	241.2	257.6	237.1	174.9	106.7	51.1	41.9	1,802.9
Percentage possible sunshine	18.8	29.4	34.0	44.1	44.8	46.7	51.0	51.7	42.7	31.8	19.8	16.1	35.9
Source 1: Meteolux (percent sunshine 1981–2010)
Source 2: Infoclimat

=== Geology ===
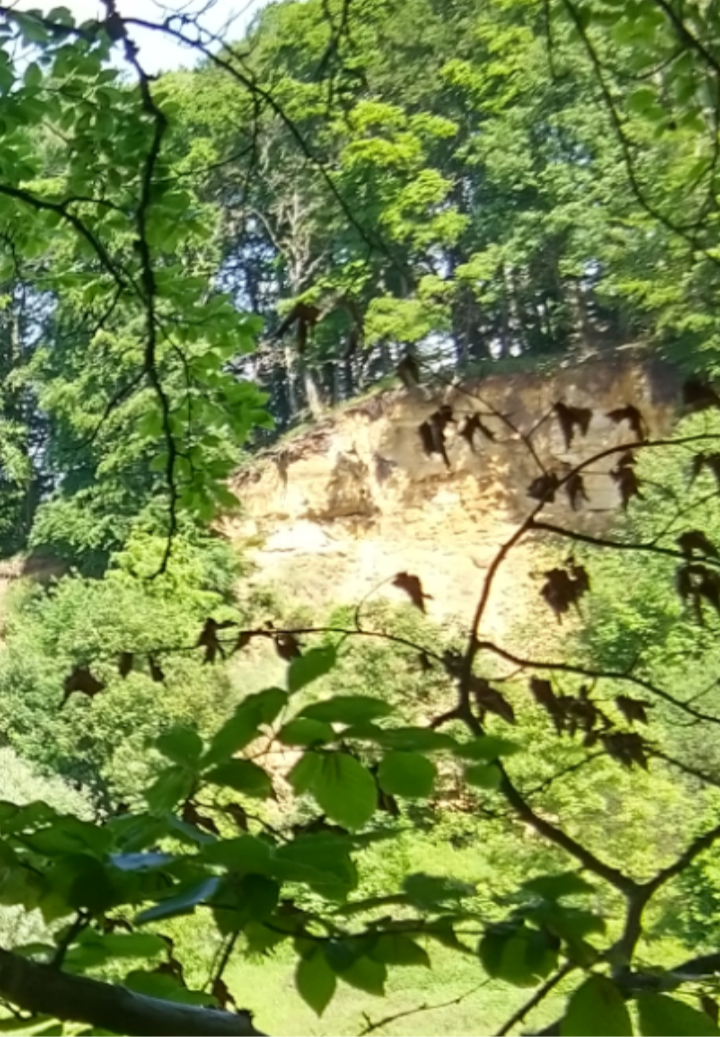
Large Sandstone cliff near Medingen

Being in the Guttland region, Contern's geological structure consists largely of Luxembourg Sandstone with deposits of lime and clay underneath. The rock formations that now surround the River Syre date back to the late Triassic period.

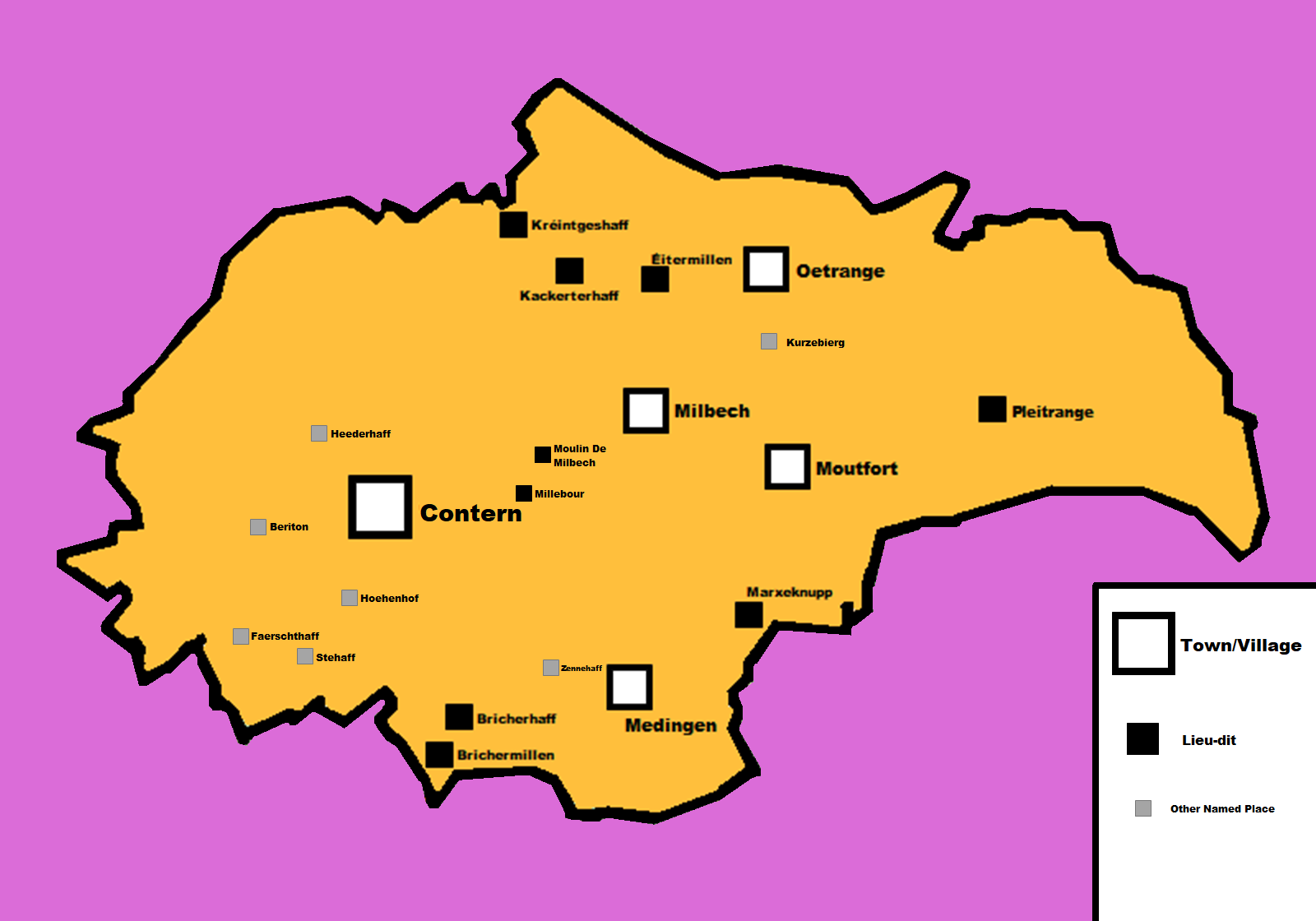
Map of settlements in Contern

=== Settlements ===
==== Towns ====
- Contern
- Moutfort
- Oetrange

==== Villages ====
- Medingen
- Millbech

==== Lieux-dits ====
- Bricherhaff
- Brichermillen
- Kackerterhaff
- Kréintgeshaff
- Marxeknupp
- Eitermillen
- Pleitrange

==== Localities ====
- Moulin de Milbech
- Maulin Diderich
- Beriton
- Shalten
- Schleedervale
- Ledenbierg
- Millebridge
- Schleederfalls
- Stuwelshill
- Fehreston
- Eltercavern
- Wilkon Hill
- Millangswell
- Rouvale
- Canten
- Linten
- Kueledall
- Stehaff
- Reulendergassen

==== Suburbs ====
- Hoehenhof

==== Industrial zones ====
- Chaux de Contern
- Rosswénkel
- Weiergewann
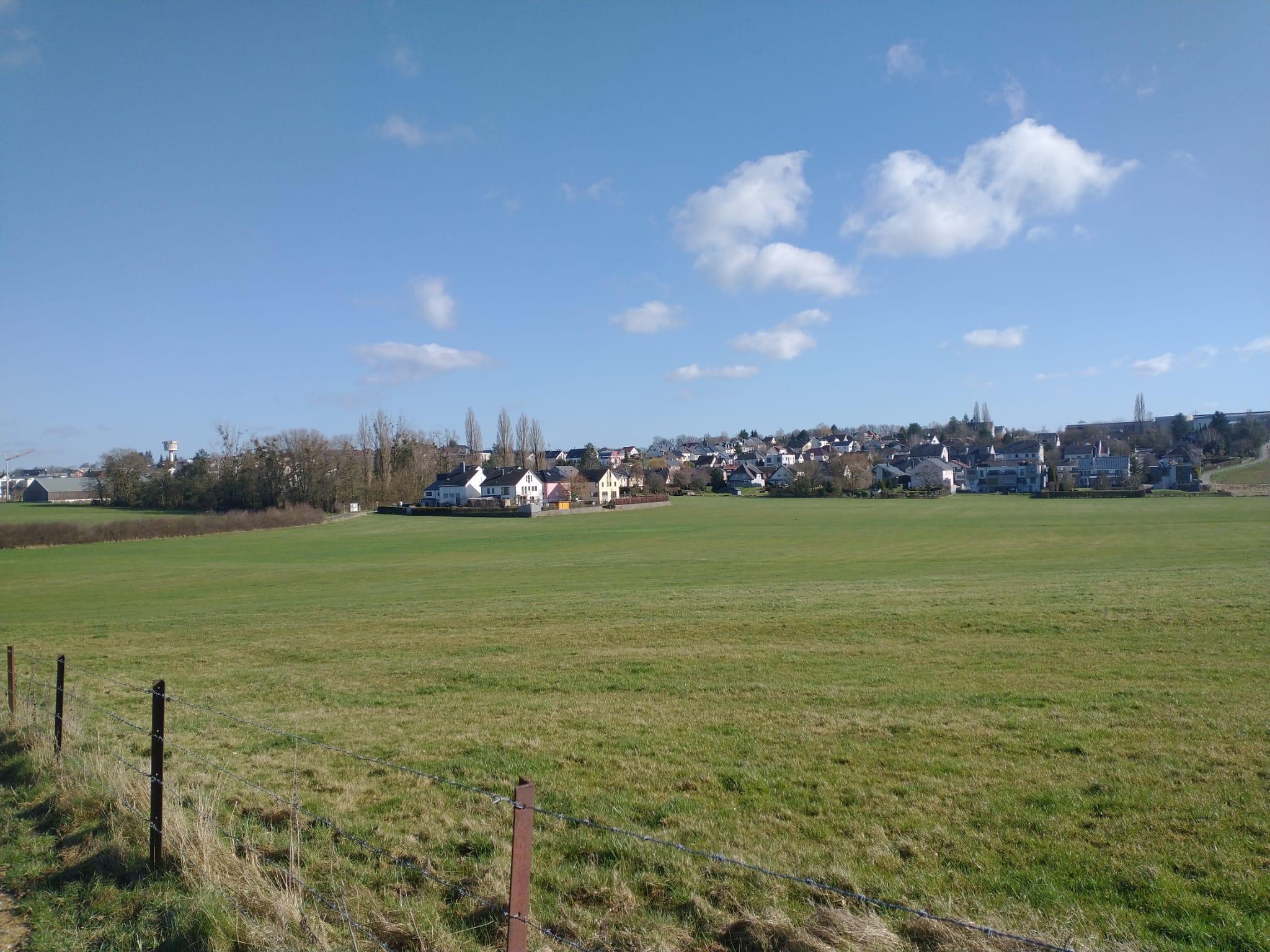
Contern

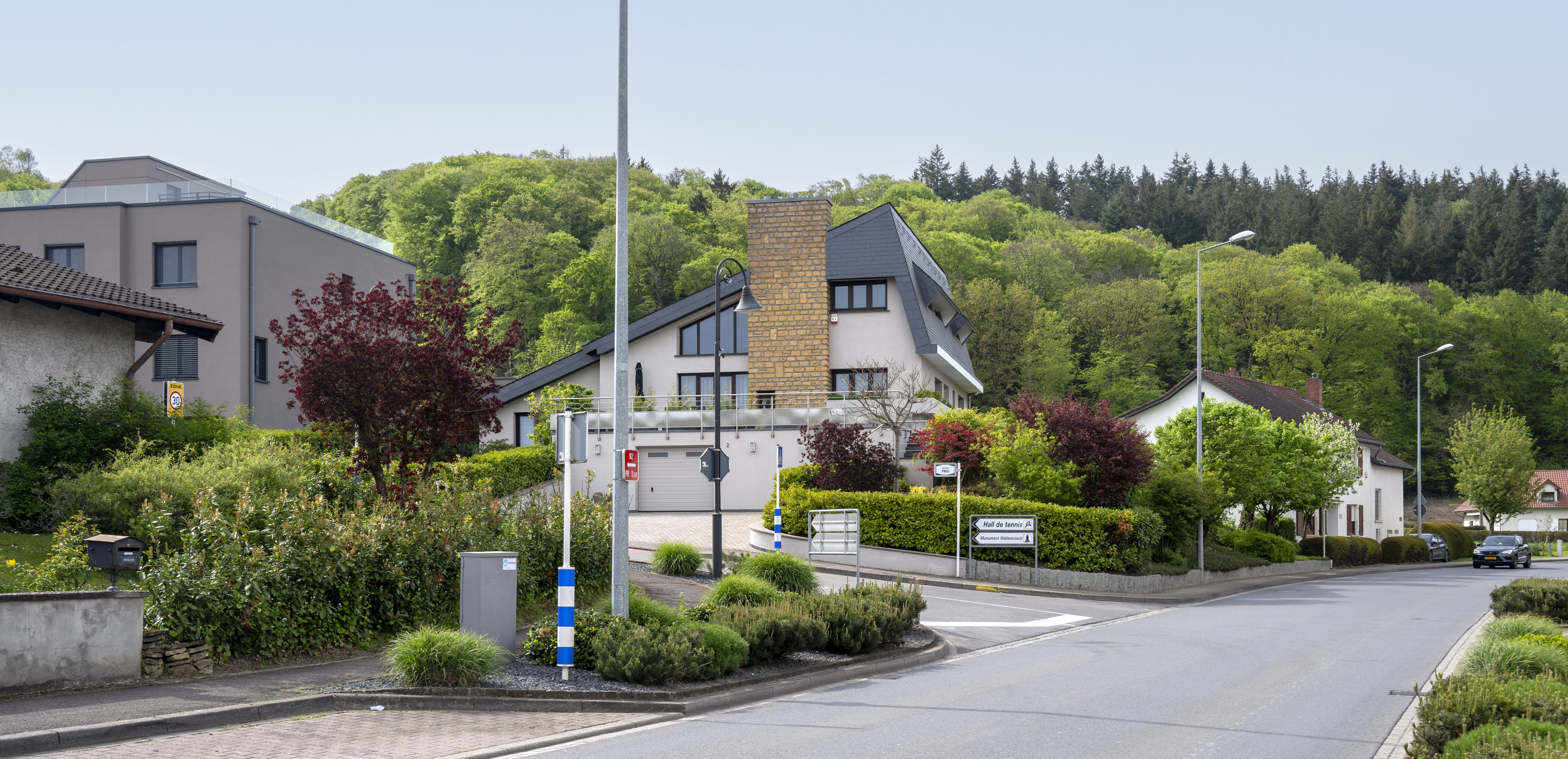
Moutfort

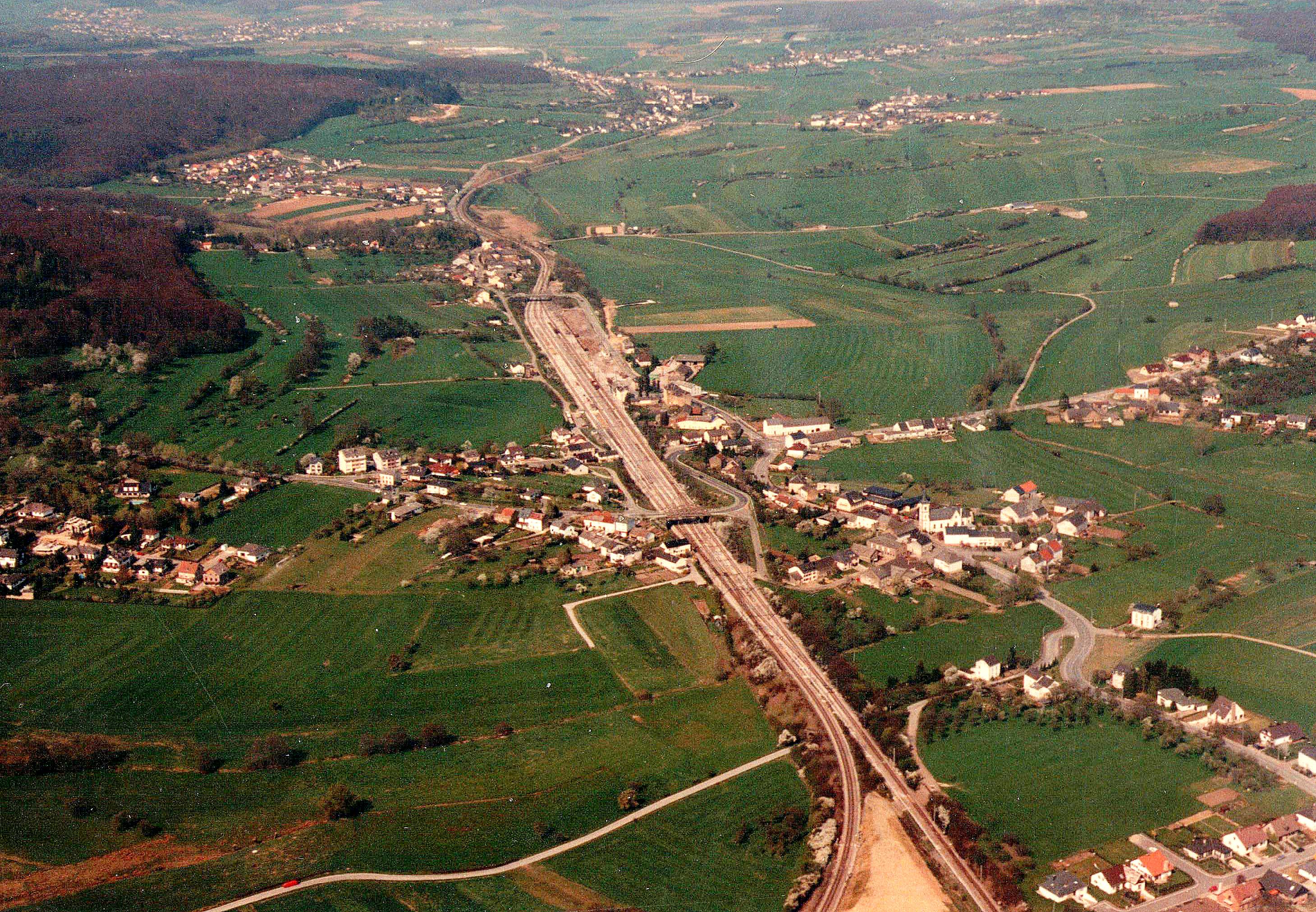
Oetrange

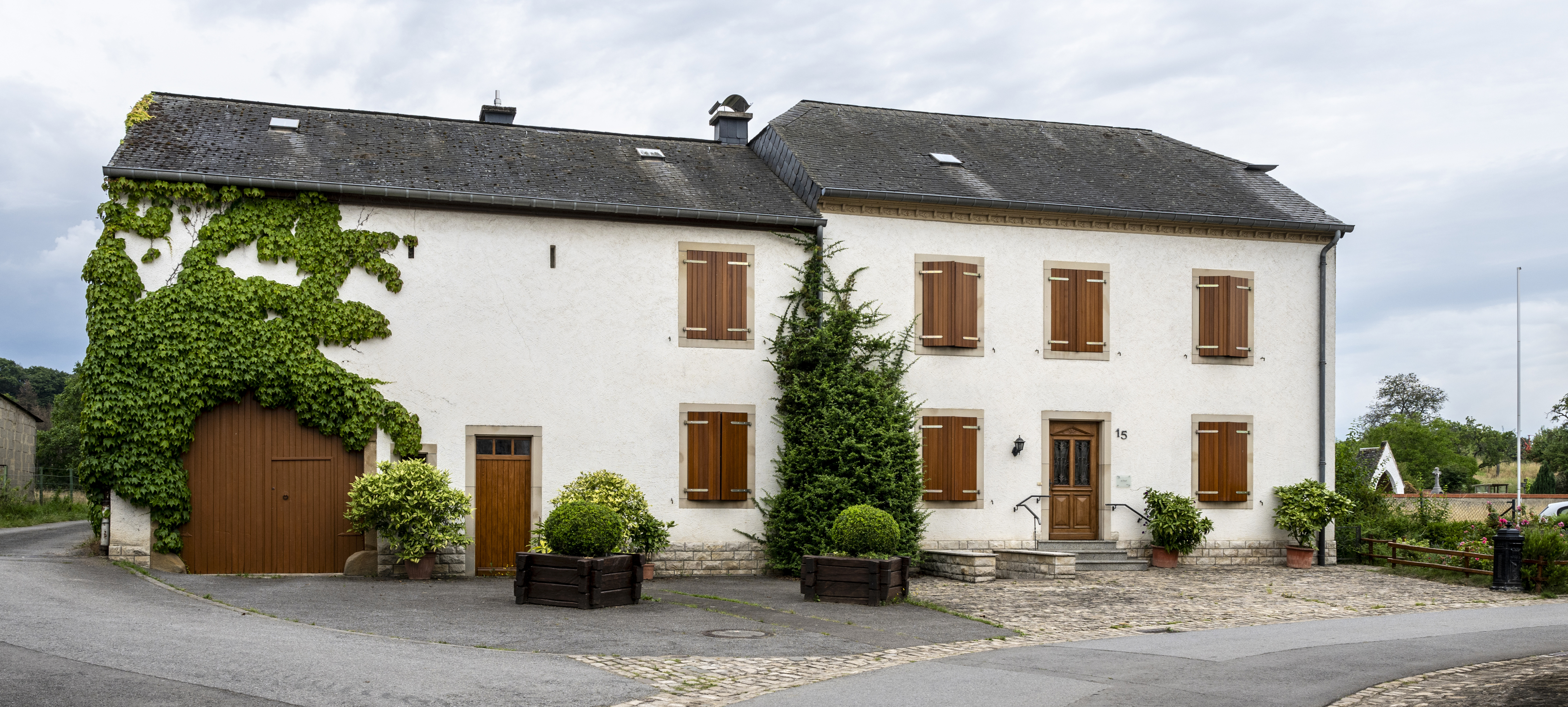
Medingen

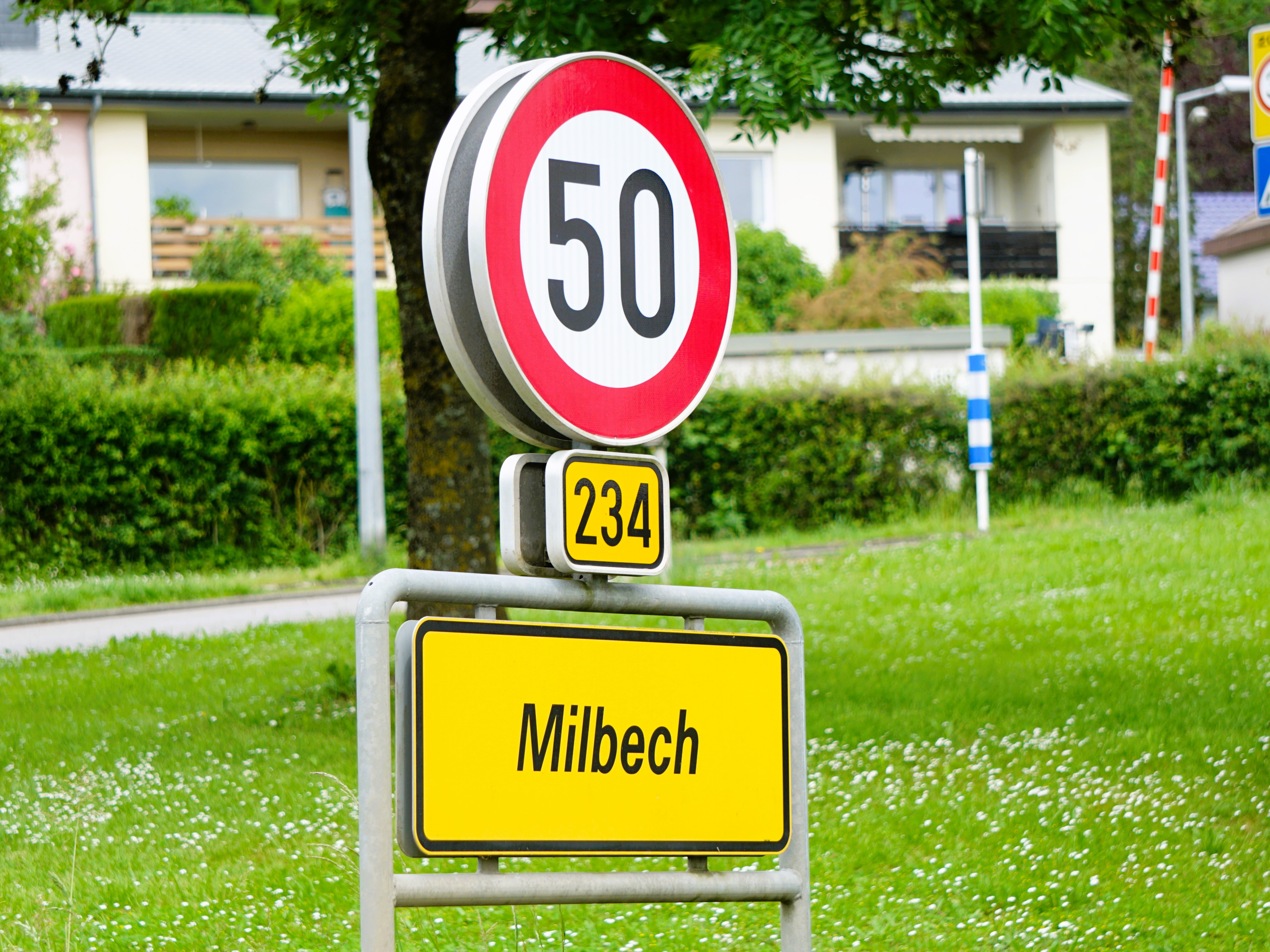
Milbech

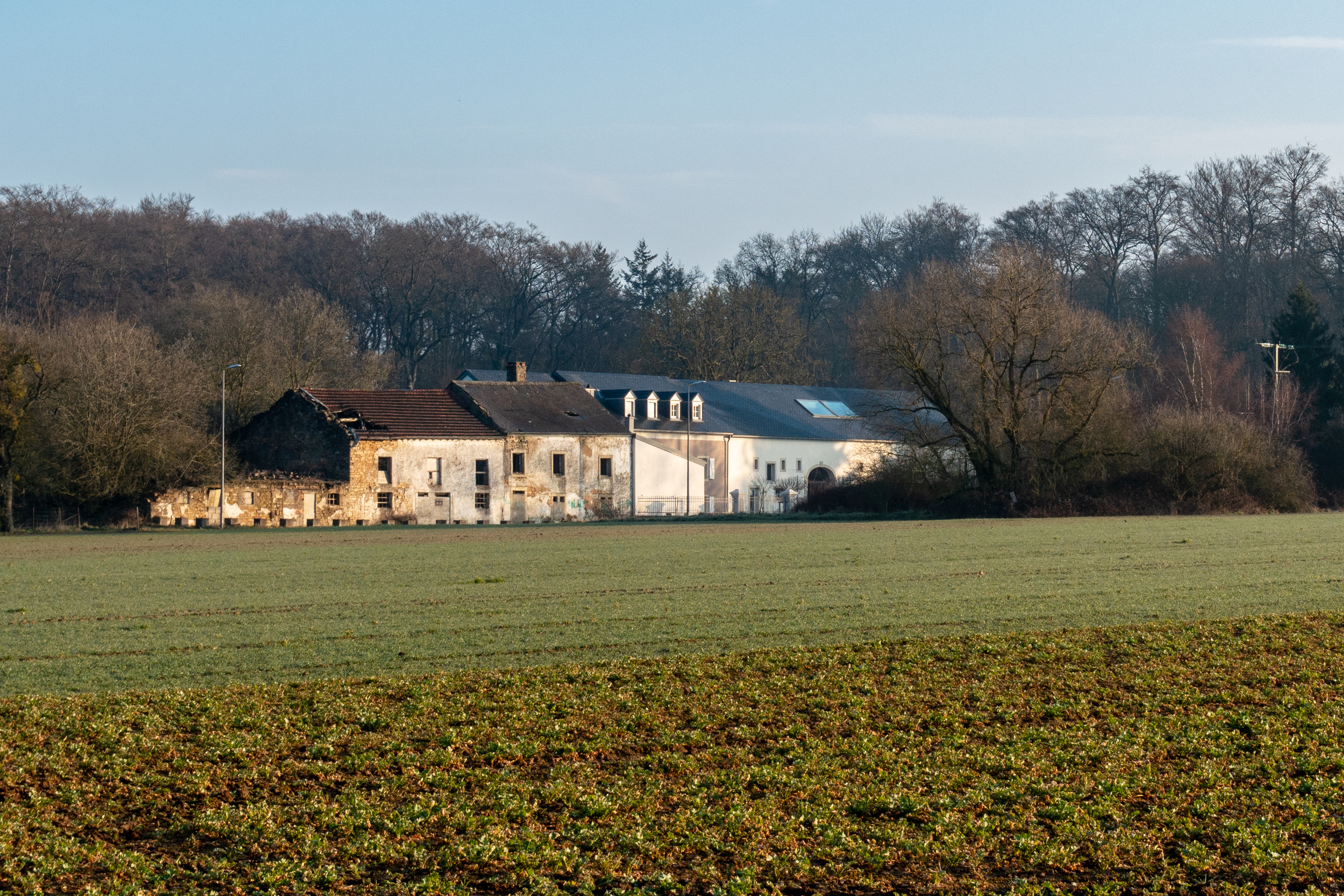
Kréingeshaff

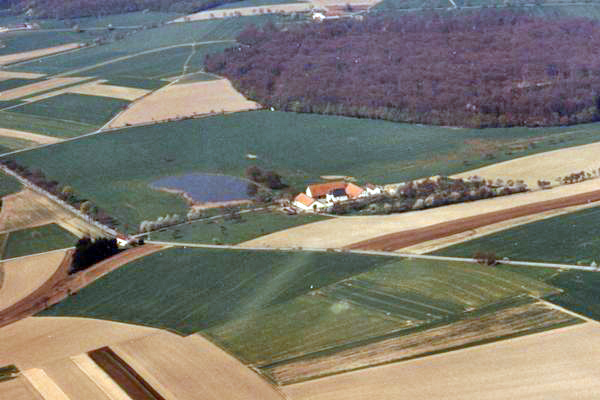
Pleitrange

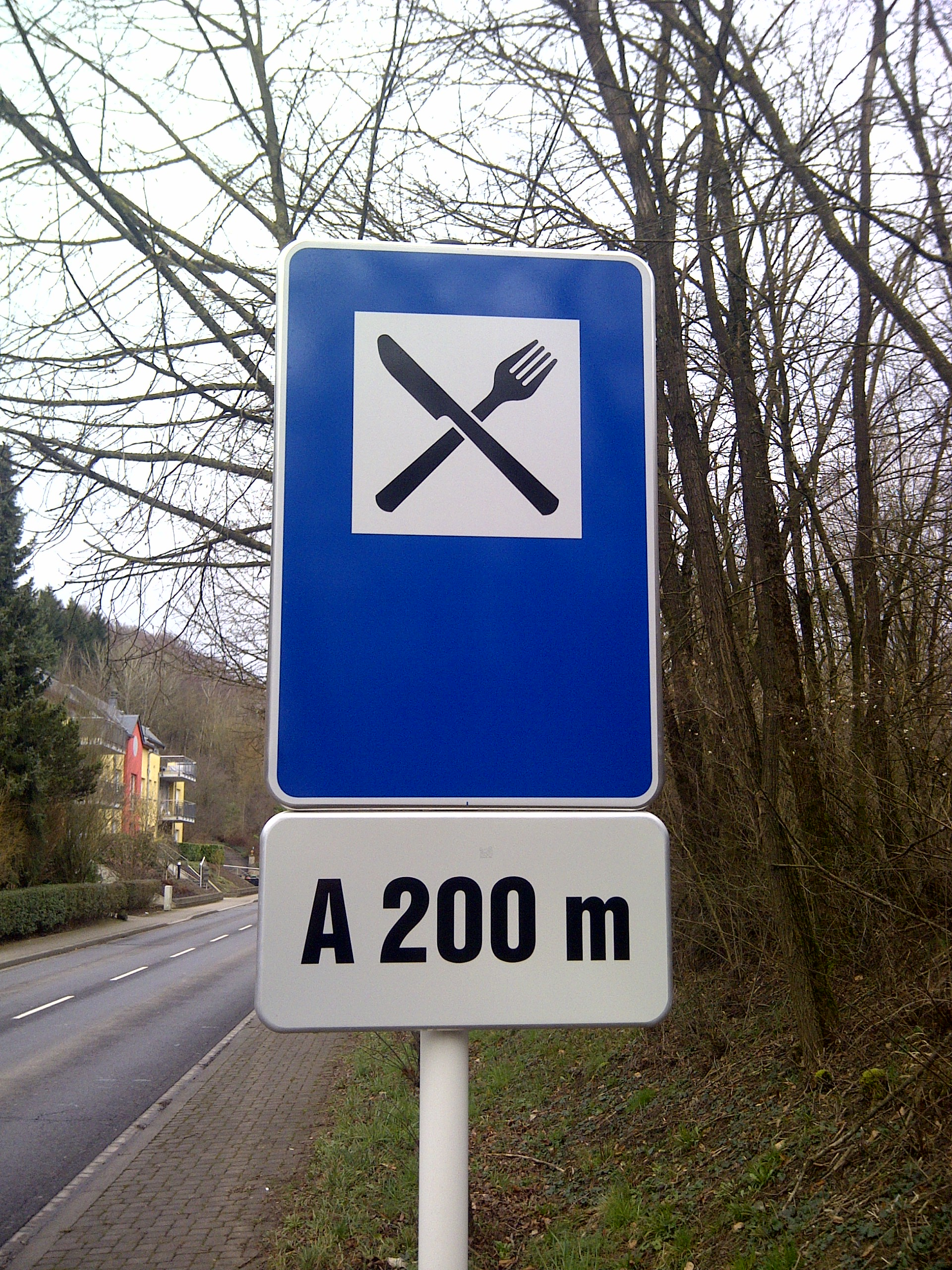
Eitermillen

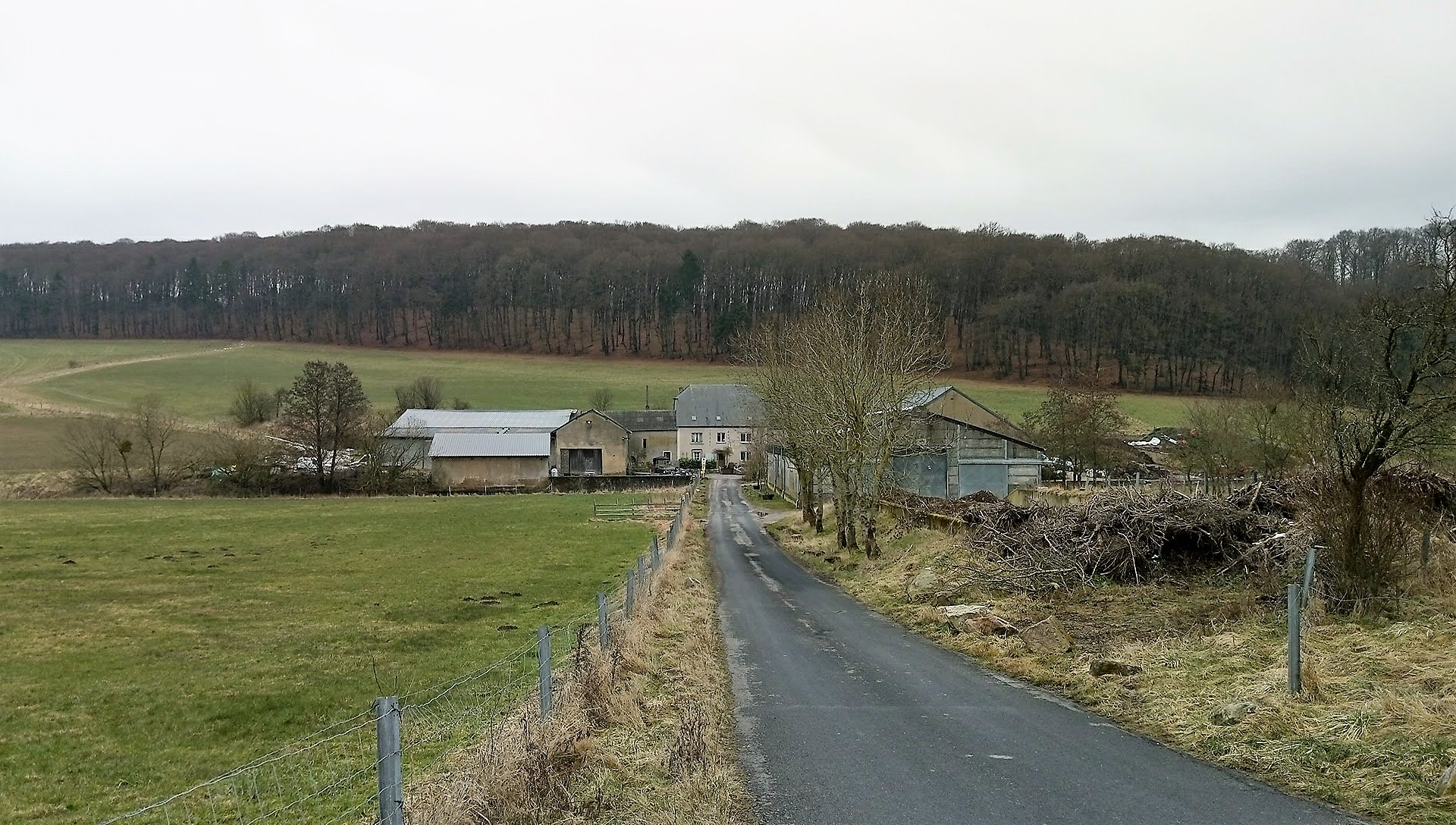
Bricherhaff

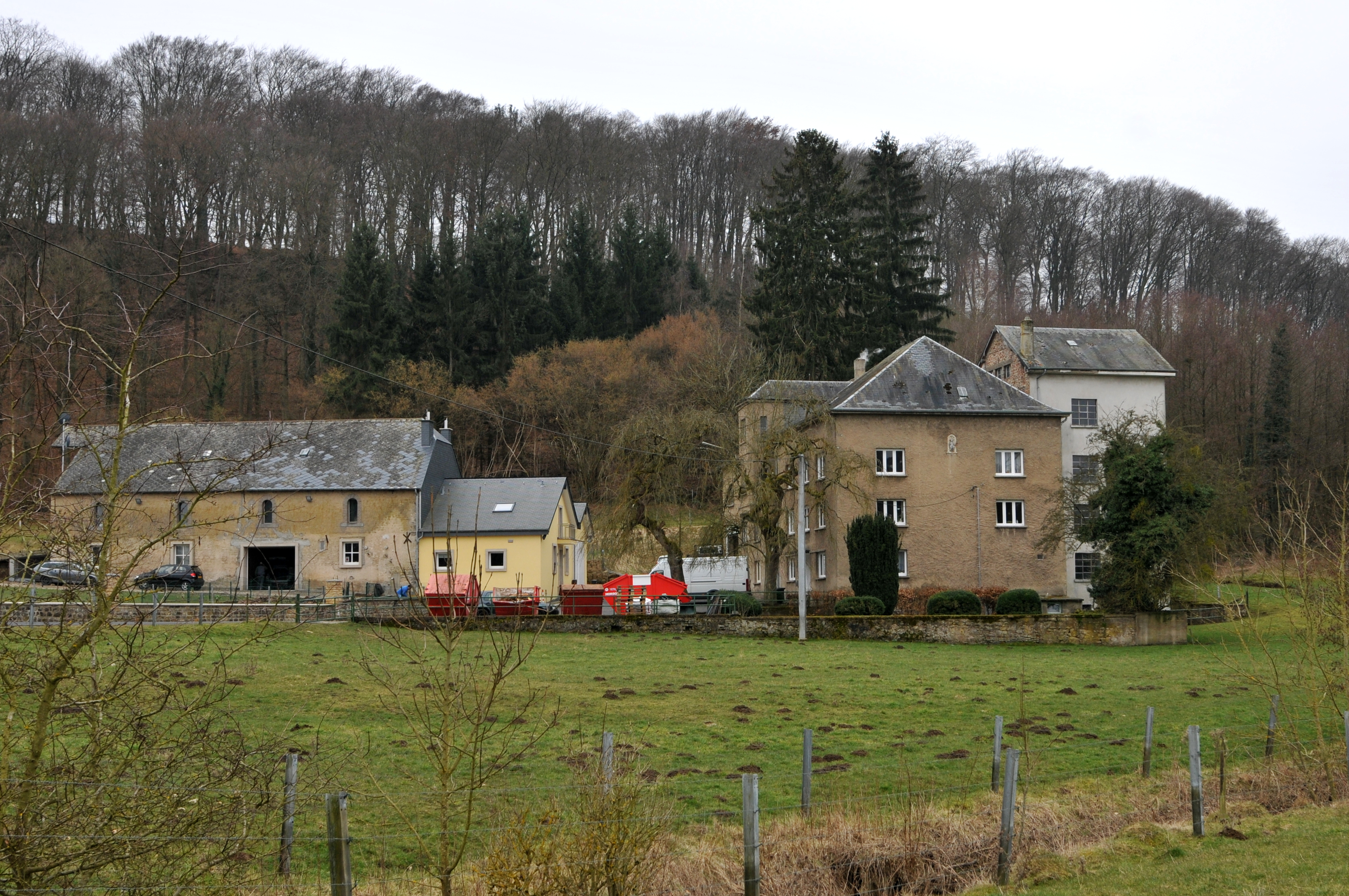
Brichermillen

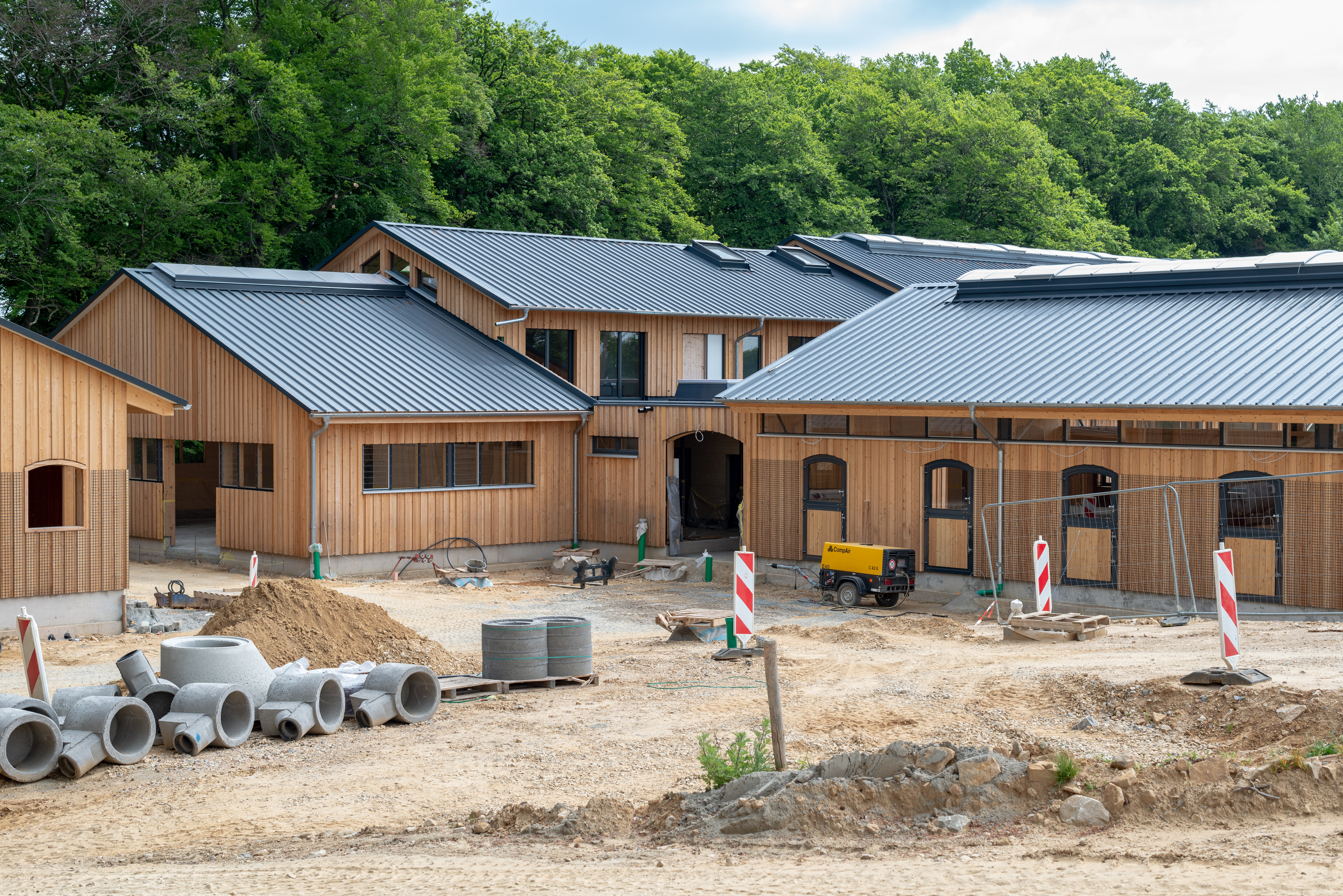
Kackerterhaff

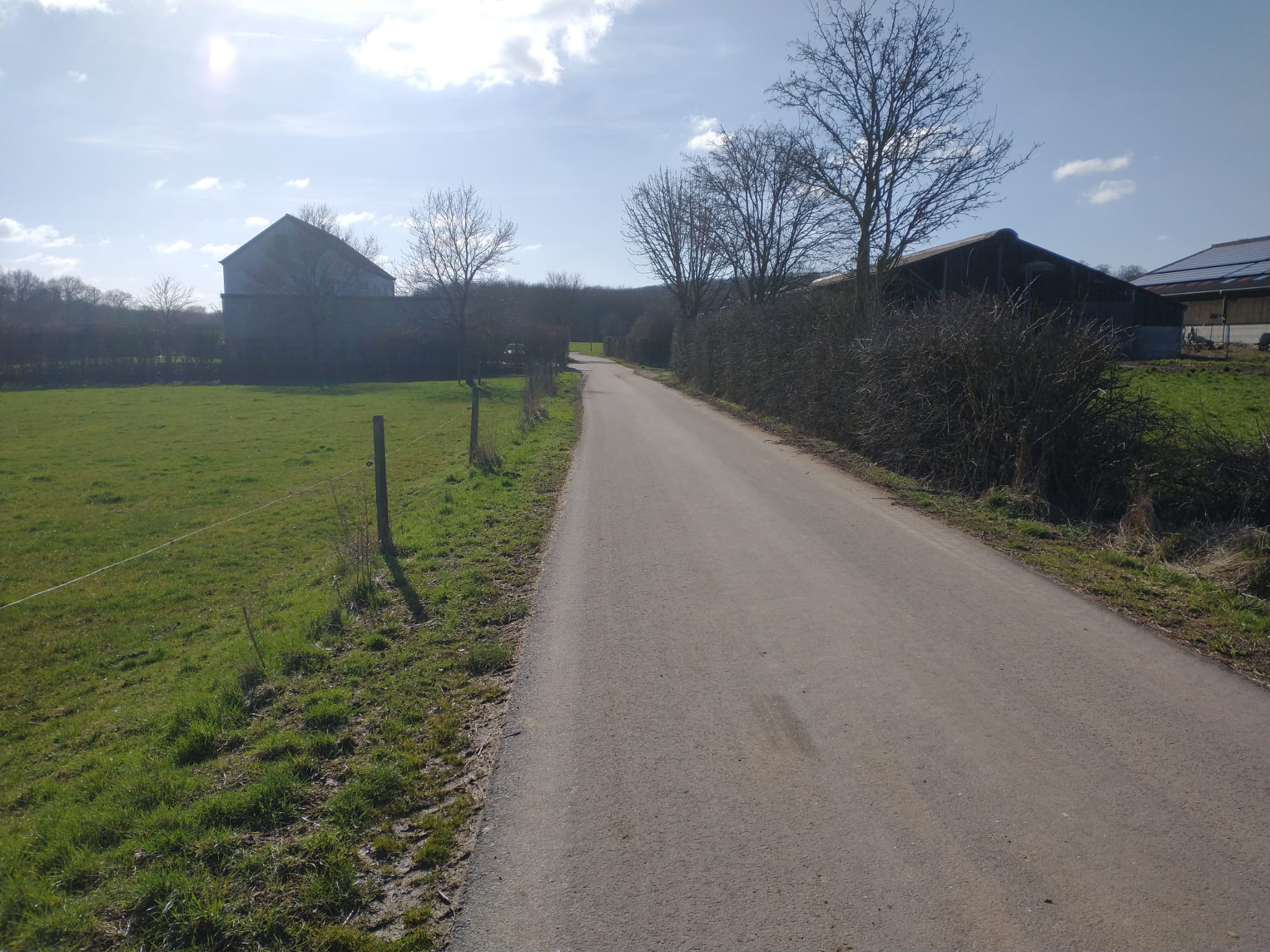
Faerschthaff

=== Rivers and streams ===
Contern lies exclusively within the Rhine and Moselle basins. Most of Contern's territory flows into the Moselle through the Syre. A small portion in the northwest of the commune however flows into the Alzette and the Sauer before reaching the Moselle. Additionally, near Pleitrange, there is an area containing steams in the confluence of the Lenningerbaach which itself flows into the Moselle though the Gouschténgerbaach. The Syre passes through the commune and is a defining feature of the landscape. It flows southwest to north east but does not pass near the centre of the commune. Instead, it initially runs across the south before turning and running up north. The central and eastern areas of the commune are home to tributaries of the Alzette.

- Rhine (main branch at Hook of Holland, Netherlands)
  - Moselle (at Koblenz, Germany)
    - Sauer (at Wasserbillig, Mertert)
      - Alzette (at Ettelbruck, Ettelbruck)
        - Itzigerbaach (at Hesperange, Hesperange)
          - Réimeschbaach (at Itzig, Hesperange)
    - Syre (at Mertert, Mertert)
      - Kackeschbaach (at Oetrange)
      - Schleederbaach (at Moutfort)
      - Delbour (at Bricherhaff)
      - Trudlerbaach (at Syren, Weiler-la-Tour)
    - Gouschténgerbaach (at Ehnen, Wormeldange)
      - Lenningerbaach (at Ehnen, Wormeldange)
        - Bauschbaach (at Canach, Lenningen)
          - Alburerbaach (at Canach, Lenningen)
          - Schlund (at Canach, Lenningen)
          - Ehlang Bogert (at Hakenhaff, Lenningen)
          - Greiwoldingert (at Hakenhaff, Lenningen)

==== Schleederbaach ====
The Schleederbaach, sometimes referred to as the Millebaach, is a brook which flows from the Contern-Sandweiler industrial estate to just west of Moutfort where it meets the Syre. Historically the course of the Schleederbaach was different but was changed by the construction of the industrial zone. Now there are many channels of water within the industrial zone which flow into the Schleederbaach, additionally there is one notable tributary of the Schleederbaach in the form of a small brook near Milbech which flows from a nearby spring out of the adjacent sandstone cliffs. Similarly the cliffs which make up the Schleederbaach valley also accumulate large amount groundwater from areas just east of Contern and west of Kackerterhaff and channel it into the brook.

=== Forests ===
Contern has 800 hectares of forests within its borders, covering around 37% of its land area.

=== Land allocation ===
Contern comprises several cadastral regions. Historically these have been grouped into cadastral sheets and later cadastral sections. All plots of land are grouped into one of these cadastral regions. When the Cadastre in Luxembourg was created in 1812, Contern was divided into 13 cadastral sheets. In 1832 the cadastral sheets were replaced by six cadastral sections, these varied greatly in size and in population and today the cadastre is usually organised on the communal level.

Cadastral Sheets as of 1822
Cadastral Sheet	Included Settlements	Notes
A1	Oetrange, Éitermillen	
A2	Kackerterhaff	
B1	Medingen	
B2	None	
B3	Moutfort, Millbech	
B4	Moutfort	
B5	Pleitrange	
B6	None	
C1	Contern, Bricherhaff, Brichermillen	
C2	Kréintgeshaff	
C3	None	
C4	None	
C5	None	

== Demographics ==
As of 1 January 2023, the commune has a population of 4,374 inhabitants. Around 70% of the population are aged 15–65 and an estimated third of the commune's population consists of non-Luxembourgers, which is considerably higher than the national average. The town of Contern itself has a population of 1,876 As of 2025.

=== Population ===
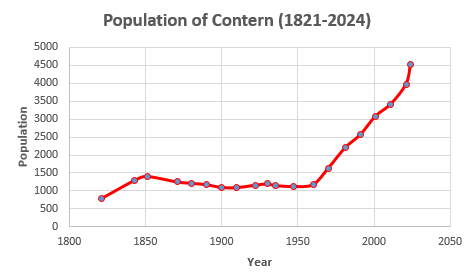
Population of Contern (1821–2024)

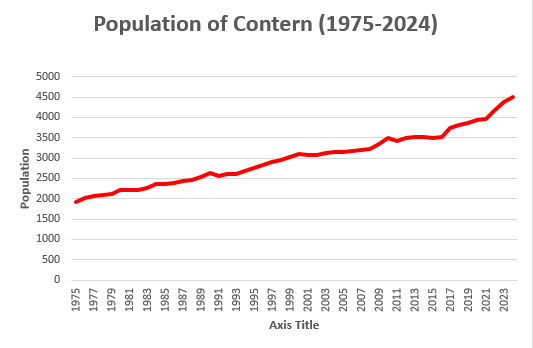
Population of Contern compiled Annually (1975–2024)

Records of the population of the commune have existed since shortly after its inception with the oldest dating back to 1821. Initially censuses and estimates were few, far between and irregular, however since 1975 statistics have been compiled annually. Contern's population has mostly been rising steadily over the past 200 years with the exception of the second half of the 19th century when there was a prolonged period of decline. Since the 1970s the population of Contern began to rise significantly as a result of an economic boom in Luxembourg.

Population of Contern 1821-1970
Year	Population					Population Density	
Year	Overall	+/-				Population Density	
Year	Overall	Total	p.a	%	%p.a	/km^{2}	/sq mi
1821	793	–	–	–	–	38.6	14.9
1843	1301	▲508	▲23.1	▲64.1	▲2.9	–	–
1851	1404	▲103	▲12.9	▲7.9	▲1.0	68.3	26.4
1871	1249	▼155	▼7.8	▼8.4	▼0.4	60.8	23.4
1880	1216	▼33	▼3.7	▼2.6	▼0.3	59.2	22.9
1890	1176	▼40	▼4	▼3.3	▼0.3	57.2	22.1
1900	1098	▼78	▼7.8	▼6.6	▼0.7	53.4	20.6
1910	1097	▼1	▼0.1	Steady	Steady	53.4	20.6
1922	1162	▲65	▲5.4	▲5.6	▲0.5	56.5	21.8
1930	1199	▲37	▲4.6	▲3.2	▲0.4	58.3	22.5
1935	1153	▼46	▼9.2	▼3.8	▼0.8	56.1	21.7
1947	1126	▼27	▼2.3	▼2.3	▼0.2	60.1	23.2
1960	1181	▲55	▲4.2	▲4.9	▲0.4	57.5	22.2
1970	1639	▲458	▲45.8	▲38.8	▲3.9	79.8	30.8

Population of Contern 1981-2021
Year	Population			Population Density	
Year	Overall	+/-		Population Density	
Year	Overall	Total	%	/km^{2}	/sq mi
1981	2203	–	–	107.2	41.4
1991	2568	▲365	▲16.6	125.0	48.3
2001	3082	▲514	▲20.0	150.0	57.9
2011	3419	▲337	▲10.9	166.4	64.3
2021	3968	▲549	▲16.1	193.1	74.6

==== Population by locality ====
Percentage distribution of Contern’s population by locality (2023)
1. Contern (42.0%)
2. Moutfort (34.7%)
3. Oetrange (20.3%)
4. Medingen (3.00%)

Since 2021, the population of the individual towns in the commune has been independently compiled, censuses taking place every decade also distinguish between localities. Population totals for each of these localities also include the general area around the locality including nearby lieu-dits.

Population of the localities in Contern by year 2021-2024
Year	Contern	Moutfort	Oetrange	Medingen
2021	1587	1406	843	132
2022	1743	1450	858	126
2023	1836	1517	890	131
2024	1876	–	–	–

Population evolution of localities in Contern 1981-2011
Year	Total			Contern			Moutfort			Oetrange			Medingen		
Year	Total	Males	Females	Total	Males	Females	Total	Males	Females	Total	Males	Females	Total	Males	Females
1981	2203	1120	1083	796	412	384	814	409	405	479	242	237	114	57	57
1991	2568	1287	1281	895	440	455	966	482	484	595	311	284	112	54	58
2001	3082	1547	1535	1065	527	538	1148	583	565	769	388	381	100	49	51
2011	3419	1695	1724	1273	629	644	1256	625	631	781	391	390	109	50	59

== Economy ==
Contern is a commuter town, largely dependant on Luxembourg city for its economy. Contern however also has a major industrial district which makes up the bulk of Contern's economic output. As a result of the industry, more people work in the commune than reside in it.

=== Industry ===
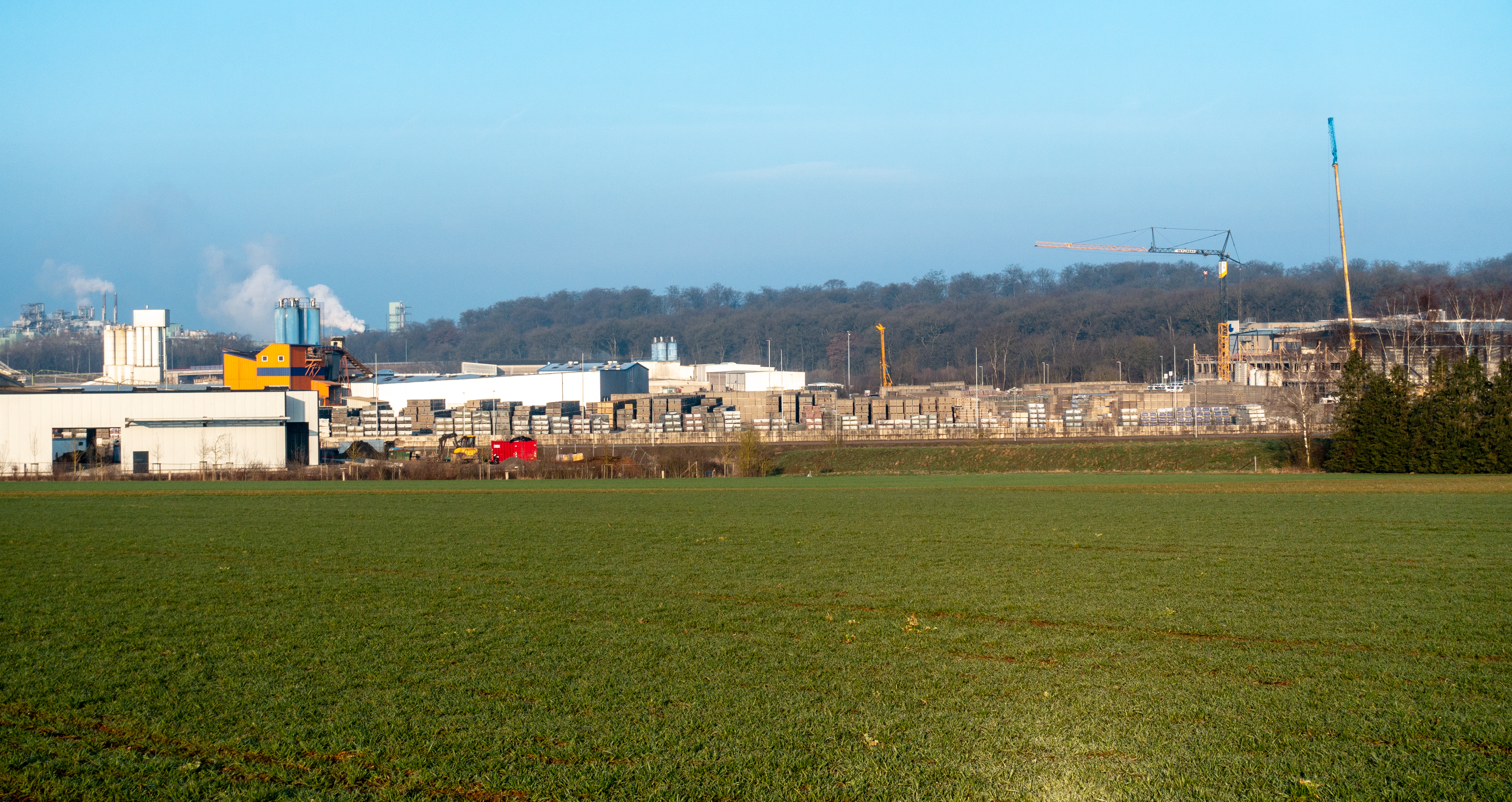
Industrial Zone Chaux de Contern as seen from the nearby fields

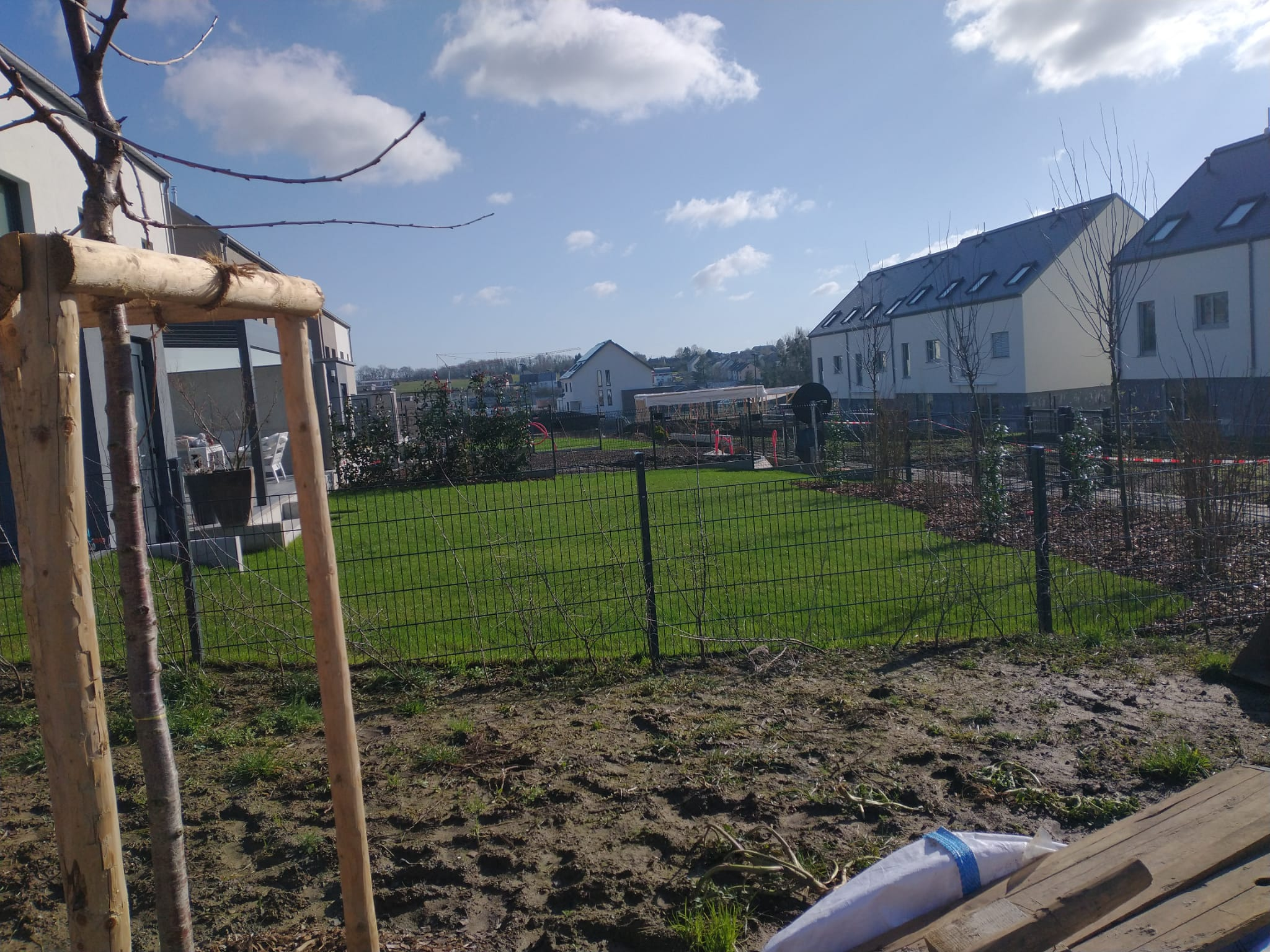
The An de Steng residential development

Contern consists of two quite separate industrial zones. Although officially separate, locally they are often considered as one entity, even on road signs. The area where Sandweiler-Contern railway station is located is home to a lot of commercial infrastructure such as the only fully-fledged supermarket in the commune, a trampoline park and the commune's only gas station. A few restaurants and eateries are also located there to serve the local workers. Employing over 5,000, the area is home to more than 110 companies and is quickly growing and attracting new developments.

=== Data ===
Monthly Salaries in Contern
Year	Average		Median		Bottom 10%		Top 10%	
Year	Total	Growth	Total	Growth	Total	Growth	Total	Growth
2013	5931		4408		1813		10380	
2014	6071	▲2.36	4442	▲0.77	1855	▲2.32	10387	▲0.07
2015	6097	▲0.43	4495	▲1.19	1853	▼0.11	10581	▲1.86
2016	6710	▲10.05	4567	▲1.60	1923	▲3.78	10900	▲3.01
2017	6550	▼2.38	4820	▲5.54	1987	▲3.33	11259	▲3.29
2018	6511	▼0.60	4701	▼2.46	1860	▼6.39	11313	▲0.48
2019	7222	▲10.92	4884	▲3.89	1997	▲7.37	11839	▲4.65
2020	7804	▲8.06	5431	▲11.20	2179	▲9.11	12293	▲3.83
2021	7402	▼5.15	5348	▼1.53	2202	▲1,06	12315	▲0.18
2022	8886	▲20.05	5680	▲6.21	2292	▲4.09	13359	▲8.47
2023	9907	▲11.49	6150	▲8.27	2603	▲13.57	14713	▲10.14

== Transportation ==
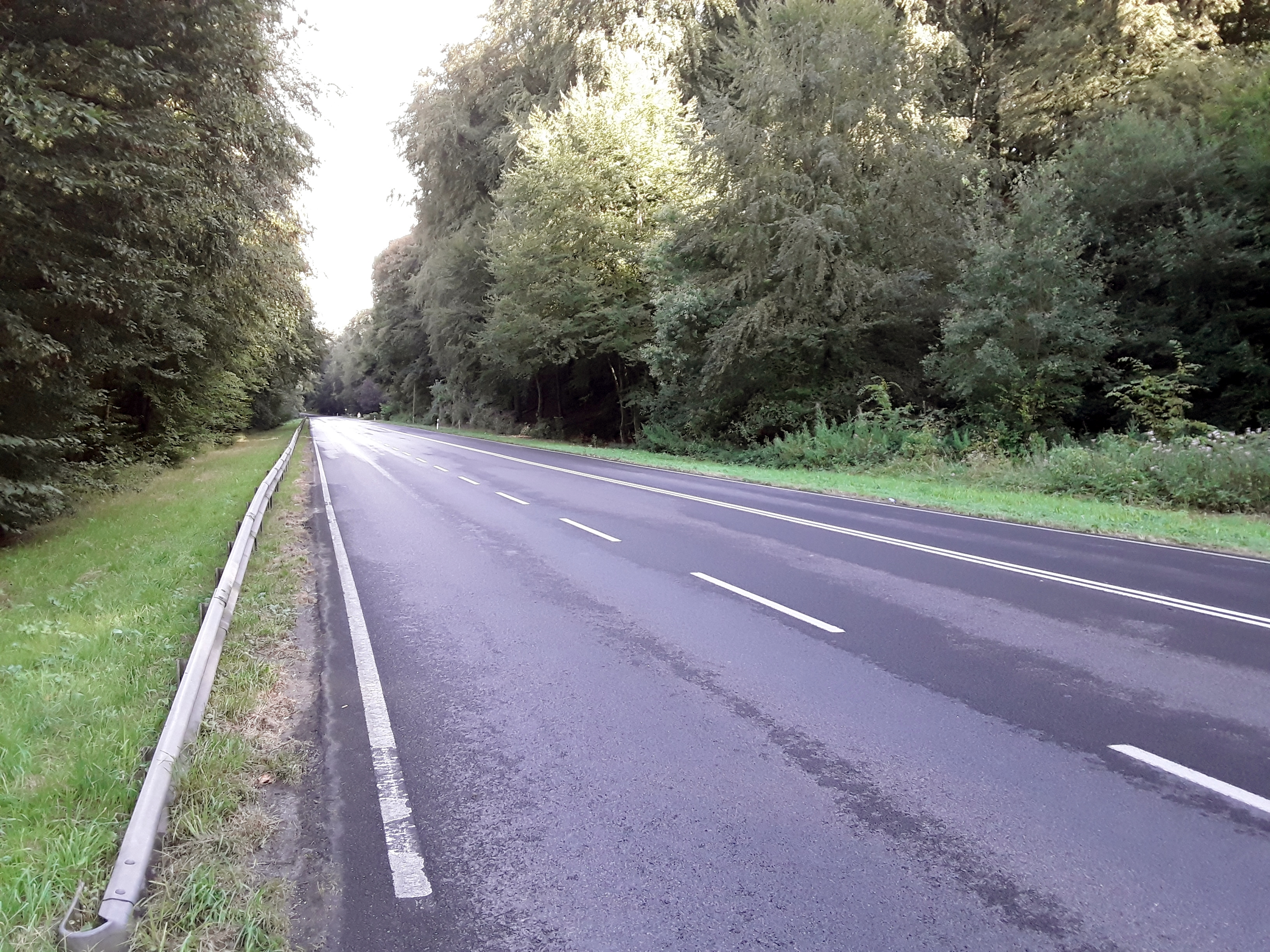
The N2 (European Route E29) running through the commune just North of Eitermillen

=== Road ===
Contern is well connected to the road network and links to Luxembourg City. However the only dual carriageway in the commune is the E29. There are plans in the next five to ten 5–10 years to build a new motorway exit on the Luxembourg Ring to serve Contern and Itzig.

Contern is involved with websites that provide traffic info.

The first road infrastructure constructed within the boundaries of the today's commune was also the oldest known instance of any infrastructure in the commune in the form of the Roman road from Luxembourg City to Dalheim, including a crossing over the Trudlerbaach. Parts of this road including the river crossing still remain in the locality of op der Syrener-Heed.

==== Motorways ====
No Motorways pass directly through Contern, the nearest is the A1, currently the nearest junction to Contern is in Hamm, adjacent to the neighbouring Commune of Sandweiler. In 2016, the Governing CSV party proposed a new junction on the A1 in order to serve Contern, Itzig and the Contern-Sandweiler industrial estate as well as a new road to connect the junction to all of those places citing the alarming increase of through traffic in the commune as the main reason the construct it. The new connecting road would run directly to the Contern-Sandweiler industrial estate.

==== Trunk Roads ====
There are 2 Trunk Roads (Route National) The most prominent is the N2 which makes up a part of European Route E29.

Road	Route	Via (Within Contern)
N2	Luxembourg (Verlorenkost) - Remich	Moutfort, Éitermillen, Kréintgeshaff
N28	Sandweiler-Bous	Oetrange, Pleitrange

==== Secondary Roads ====
Contern has several secondary roads (chemin repris):

Road	Route	Via (Within Contern)
CR 132	Bech-Syren	Moutfort, Oetrange
CR 144	Oetrange-Ehnen	Oetrange
CR 153	Moutfort-Dalheim	Moutfort, Medingen
CR 226	Itzig-Filsdorf	Contern
CR 234	Sandweiler-Moutfort	Contern-Sandweiler Industrial Zone, Contern, Milbech

=== Bus ===
Contern is served by many different bus routes as are many of the other towns within the commune. The bulk of the routes run along the N2 trunk road through Moutfort including 2 express routes which only call at Moutfort, Kapell. There are other routes which connect Oetrange and Medingen with Contern. And 1 route which only serves the Contern-Sandweiler industrial Zone. Additional Contern, Moutfort and Oetrange are served by a singular night bus on Fridays Saturdays and the night before public holidays. There are also various school bus routes.

=== Rail ===
Management of Railways in Contern
Dates	Organisation	Overseen by
1861-1871	Société royale grand-ducale des chemins de fer Guillaume-Luxembourg	Chemins de fer de l'Est
1871–1946	Société royale grand-ducale des chemins de fer Guillaume-Luxembourg	Compagnie EL (Reichseisenbahn Elsass-Lothringen)
1946-prensent	Société Nationale des Chemins de Fer Luxembourgeois	Luxembourg Government

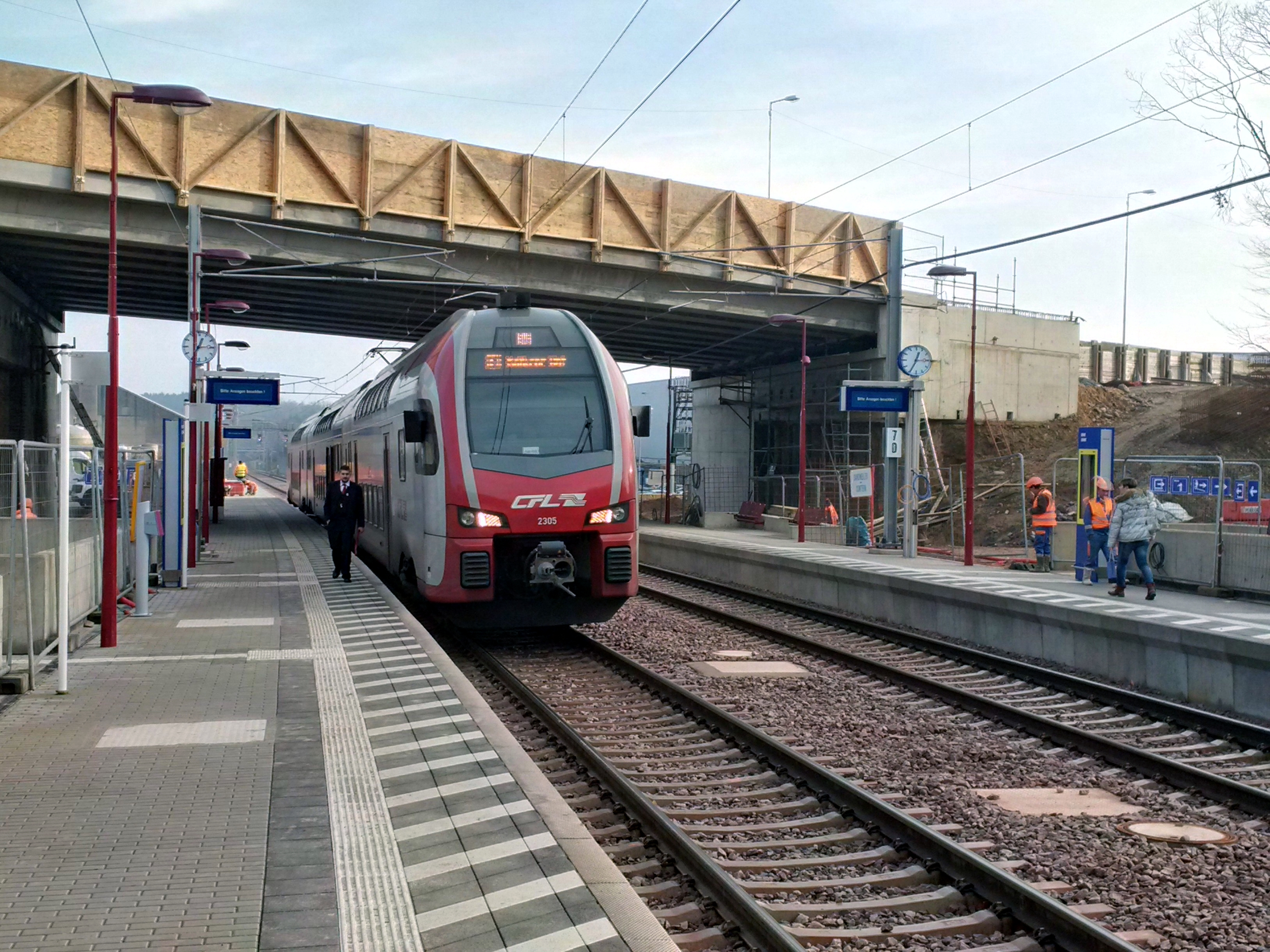
Sandweiler-Contern Station

The Commune of Contern is served by CFL Line 30. There are two stations inside the commune, Oetrange Railway Station and Sandweiler-Contern Station. The track also passes through Moutfort and Milbech which have no stations. Typically Oetrange is served by two regional trains an hour westboud: one to Luxembourg City westbound and one to Wittlich; eastboud one to Wasserbillig. Sandweiler-Contern also sees an hourly semi-fast service from Luxembourg to Trier/Koblenz. In addition to Line 30 there is a junction in Oetrange to CFL Line 4 which runs through Moutfort and out of the commune towards Fentange and Berchem on CFL Line 60. This line is a freight line used by trains to bypass Luxembourg city centre. It has no regular passenger service unless the line between Luxembourg and Oetrange is closed for engineering works.

Rail transport initially reached the commune in 1861 when what would become CFL Line 30 was built by Guillaume-Luxembourg. Both stations in the commune today were opened then.

=== Air ===
The nearest airport to Contern is Luxembourg Airport, located a few miles north of the commune.

== Municipality and governance ==
Contern is a commune which has a local government and therefore a mayor, college of aldermen and communal council. Elections are held every six years alongside all 99 other Luxembourgish communes. The current mayor is Dali Zhu (DP), who was sworn in on 11 December 2025, becoming the first mayor of Asian origin in Luxembourg.

=== Services ===
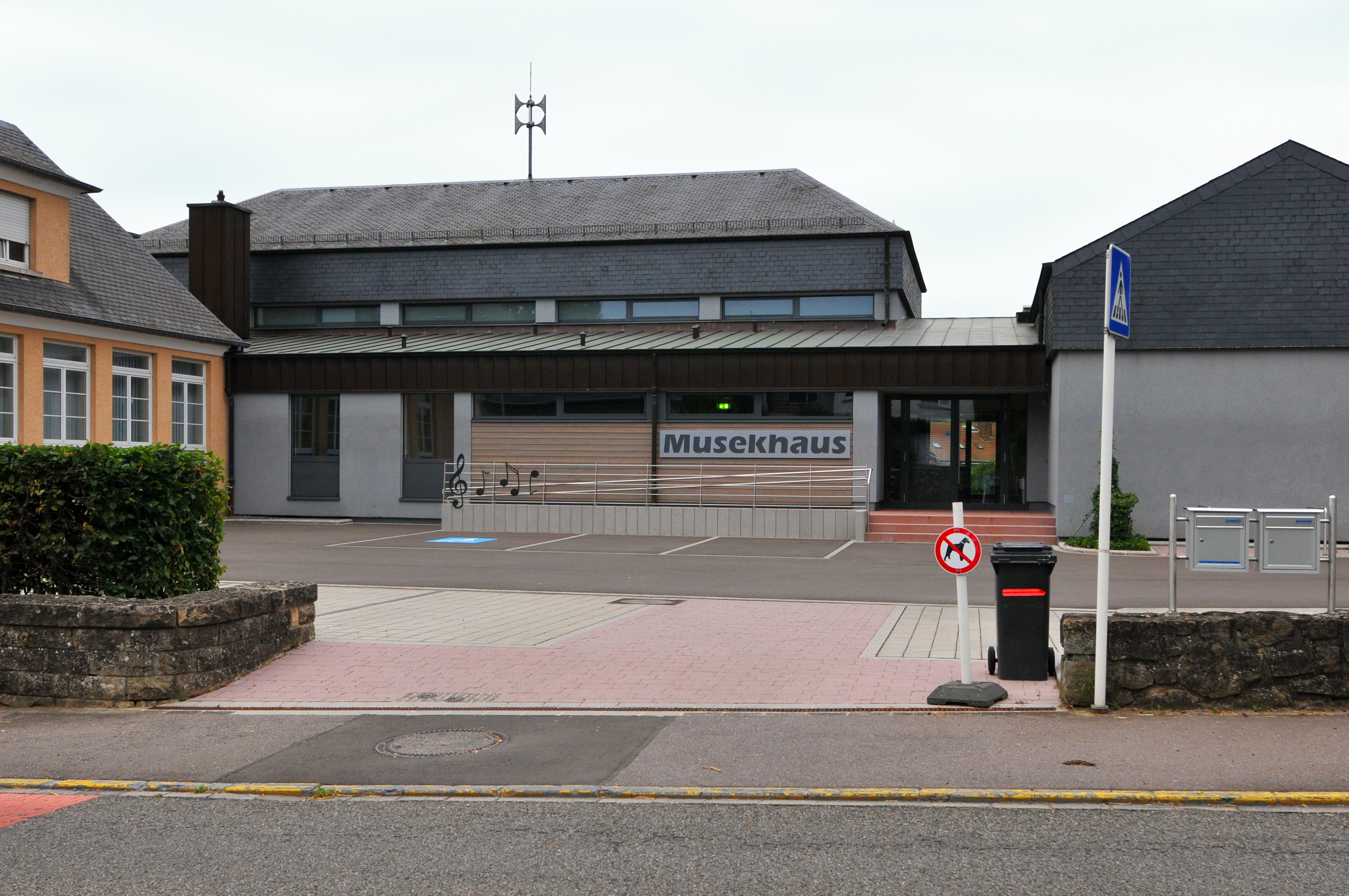
The school in Oetrange

The commune owns and runs a school in the southwest of the town. The commune is delegated with the task of ensuring that Government Mandated Education is enforced, the education budget is controlled, and that the school buses linking the rest of the commune with the school are operational. Many local residents, particularly of secondary school, tend to have their education outside the commune. There is also a school in Oetrange.

==== Financial ====
The Communal Revenue department manages Contern's taxation, dept and accounting.

==== Emergency services ====
Contern is not home to any hospitals, medical clinics, police stations or fire stations and must rely on neighbouring communes for such services.

==== Waste collection ====
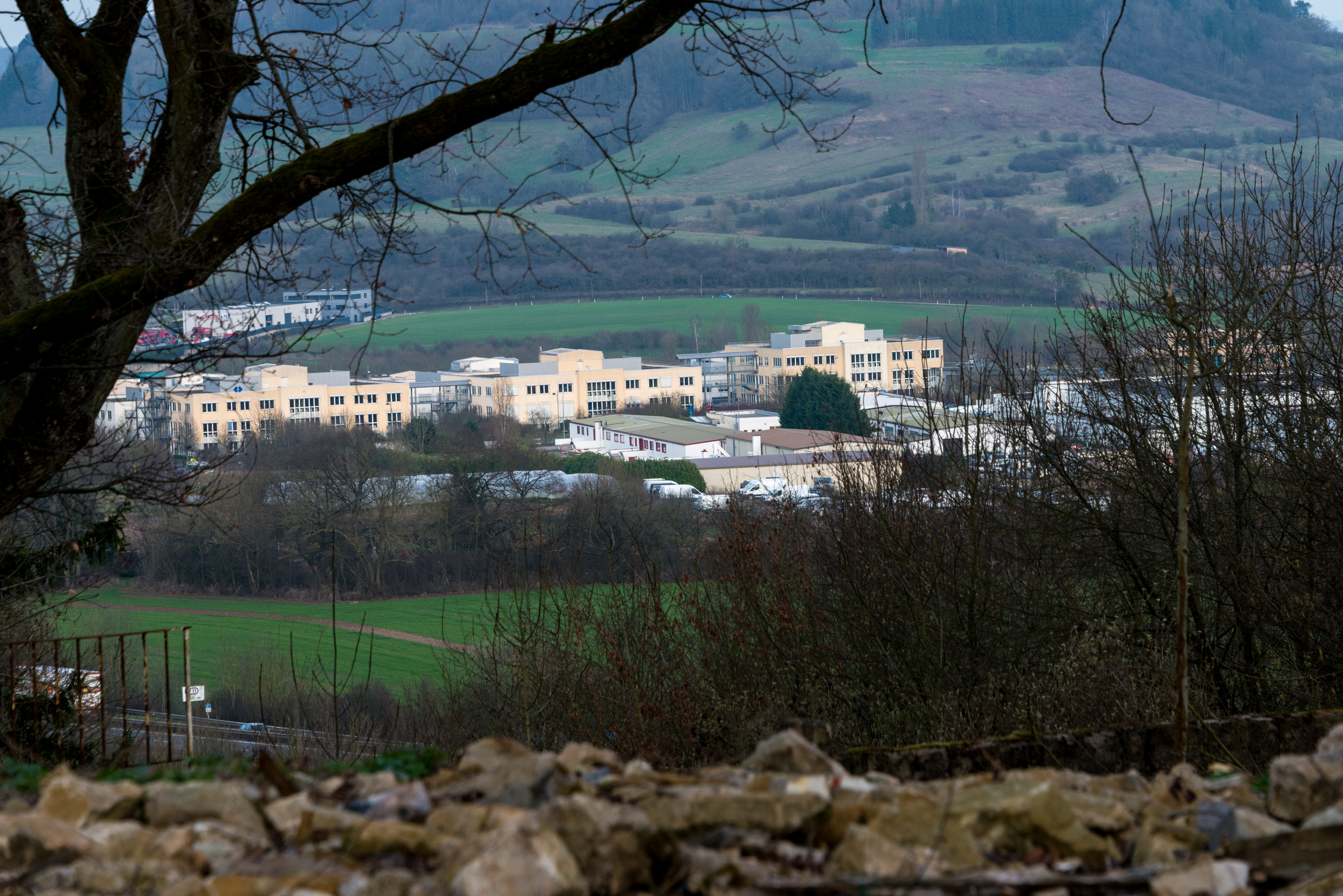
Zone industrial « Op Dem keller » where the dump is located

Waste collection is managed and run by the commune of Contern. The dump is located in the Op Dem Keller industrial zone in Munsbach and is shared with the commune of Shuttrange.

==== Urban planning ====
The urban planning department controls and manages building permits and requests. There's a two-tier system for minor and major interventions.

==== Other ====
The commune also offers services for reception, revenue, technical and communications.

=== Social component ===
Contern is in partnership with the communes in Schuttrange and Weiler-la-Tour with whom they share an office in Moutfort.

Contern endeavors to encourage the entire population to speak a large variety of languages. Many Local children speak Luxembourgish, French, German and even English. The commune wishes to spread the speaking of all these languages to everyone in their boundaries, assisted heavily by their Luxembourgish courses.

Luxembourgish has been on the rise recently, with many documents being posted in Luxembourgish, sometimes exclusively. The commune of Contern is encouraging learning of the national language through courses they have arranged. Courses occur yearly to meet the needs of the large immigrant population.

=== Municipality ===
The commune of Contern operates many of the services in its designated area. The commune runs multiple buildings such as the town hall, municipal workshop and social office. It also issues many public documents available online. Applications for commune job are possible, even for people as young as 16. All new regulations made the by the commune are also available in PDF form online. The human resources department service is responsible for managing municipal jobs, including jobs for students aged 16 and over during the summer. The commune also offers the "cost of living allowance." It comes from the FNS and can be applied for as long as the decision is enclosed with the SNSF agreement, together with an PDF form which needs to be completed. There's also a separate National Fund for low income citizens, the total sum is determined mostly by their household.

==== WIFI4EU ====
Contern has worked with the European Commission to bring publicly available Wi-Fi to certain areas of the commune. These include both the site of the former school and parts of the current one, Prince Charles Park in Oetrange, the park in Moutfort and the Cultural Centre in Medingen. These by no coincidence, are all located within the four main settlements in Contern. There are potentially more areas which meet the criteria set by the European Commission to warrant a new hotspot but none are planned for the moment. WIFI4EU is by no means unique to Contern.

=== Elections ===
Elections in Contern occur on three levels. The Municipal elections are held for the local government exclusively within Contern. Contern also acts as a statistical ward for national legislative elections and for elections for the European Parliament. Contern has almost always been an area where the Christian Social People's Party have had a plurality of the vote within all elections.

Voting Trends in Contern over time
Year	Election	CSV	DP	LSAP
2024	European	25.92%	22.63%	19.25%
2023	National	36.57%	23.68%	11.09%
2023	Municipal	44.25%	24.44%	17.12%
2019	European	22.56%	23.39%	12.06%
2018	National	36.78%	19.07%	12.97%
2017	Municipal	44.52%	16.97%	22.07%
2014	European	40.63%	17.00%	9.70%
2013	National	36.80%	23.26%	17.26%
2011	Municipal	32.48%	27.10%	23.97%
2009	National	40.11%	18.98%	18.86%
2009	European	31.02%	22.78%	16.32%
2005	Municipal	32.43%	33.96%	33.61%
2004	National	35.76%	22.45%	17.12%
2004	European	33.91%	20.78%	15.79%
1999	National	27.90%	28.84%	17.02%
1999	European	30.54%	26.16%	17.54%
1994	National	26.98%	26.36%	18.86%
1994	European	29.05%	25.08%	18.47%

==== Municipal elections ====
As Contern has a population between 3,000 and 5,999 it elects a total of 11 councillors, including two aldermen and the mayor. Additionally as a result of having a population of over 3,000, municipal elections are held using proportional representation. Participation is mandatory for Luxembourgish citizens and unlike in general elections, non-Luxembourgish European Union citizens are permitted to vote provided they have valid residency.

The mayor is elected and is put in charge of municipal staff, administration, infrastructure, security, emergency services, communications, relations with other communes, schools and sport. In addition the mayor also heads the College of Aldermen and Municipal Council.

The College of Aldermen consists of the mayor and his two advisors who have varied responsibilities. The first alderman handles areas including mobility, weather, and fairtrade, while the second alderman oversees the environment, finances and agriculture.

The Municipal Council consists of 11 elected members including the two aldermen, the mayor and eight councilors. They are the legislators of the municipality. Meetings happen roughly every three months, take place in the town hall and are public unless otherwise stated.

The municipal elections in Contern use a form of open list proportional representation, each contesting party generally puts forward 11 candidates, one for every seat available, each voter also gets 11 votes however they needn't utilise all of them. Voters have the option to vote for a party in which case they give one vote to each candidate from that party or they can distribute their 11 votes between individual candidates as they please. They can also give any candidate up to 2 votes. The 11 seats are then distributed by party in accordance with what percentage of the popular vote they received. Then the candidates with the most votes in their respective party are assigned seats until all of the party's seats have been exhausted.

===== 2023 municipal election =====
The 2023 Local Elections in Luxembourg all took place on 11 June 2023 to elect the members of all the local councils of Luxembourg, including the 11 members of Contern Municipal Council. Following the 2017 Municipal Election, the Christian Social People's Party held the largest number of seats in the Municipal Council with 5, 2 of the 3 Aldermen were also affiliated with CSV.

Four parties ran in the election, each putting forward 11 candidates.

2023 Municipal Election by Party
List No.	Name	Abbr,	Ideology	Political Position	Votes				Seats			
List No.	Name	Abbr,	Ideology	Political Position	Total	+/-	%	+/-%	Total	+/-	%	+/-%
1	Christian Social People's Party Chrëschtlech Sozial Vollekspartei	CSV	Christian democracy	Centre to centre-right	9130	▲1028	44.25%	▼0.27	5 / 11	Steady	45.45	Steady
2	Democratic Party Demokratesch Partei	DP	Liberalism	Centre to centre-right	5042	▲1953	24.44%	▲7.47	3 / 11	▲1	27.27	▲9.10
3	Luxembourg Socialist Workers' Party Lëtzebuerger Sozialistesch Aarbechterpartei	LSAP	Social democracy	Centre-left	3551	▼466	17.12%	▼4.95	2 / 11	Steady	18.18	Steady
4	The Greens Déi Gréng	DG	Green politics	Centre-left	2909	▼82	14.1%	▼2.31	1 / 11	▼1	9.10	▼9.10
Total Votes					20632	▲2433	91.81 (Note: Refers to the total number of votes cast as a percentage of the number of votes that could have been cast if every elector used all 11 of their votes)	▼0.57				
Turnout					2201	▲298	85.08 (Note: Refers to the number of people who voted as a percentage of the number of registered voters)	▼1.87				

==== National legislative elections ====
2023 National Election by Party
List No.	Name	Abbr,	Ideology	Political Position	Votes	%
1	Christian Social People's Party Chrëschtlech Sozial Vollekspartei	CSV	Christian democracy	Centre to centre-right	13406	36.57
2	Democratic Party Demokratesch Partei	DP	Liberalism	Centre to centre-right	8646	23.68
3	Luxembourg Socialist Workers' Party Lëtzebuerger Sozialistesch Aarbechterpartei	LSAP	Social democracy	Centre-left	4066	11,09
4	The Greens Déi Gréng	DG	Green politics	Centre-left	3709	10.12
5	Alternative Democratic Reform Party Alternativ Demokratesch Reformpartei	ADR	National conservatism	Right-wing to far-right	2298	6.27
6	Pirate Party Luxembourg Piratepartei Lëtzebuerg	PPLU	Pirate politics		2240	6.11
7	Focus Fokus	FOK	Pragmatism	Centre	1103	3.01
8	The Left Déi Lénk	DL	Democratic socialism	Left-wing	844	2.30
9	Liberté - Fräiheet! Liberté - Fräiheet!	LF	Right-wing populism	Right-wing to far-right	293	0.80
10	Communist Party of Luxembourg Kommunistesch Partei vu Lëtzebuerg	KPL	Communism	Far-left	58	0.16

== Coat of arms ==
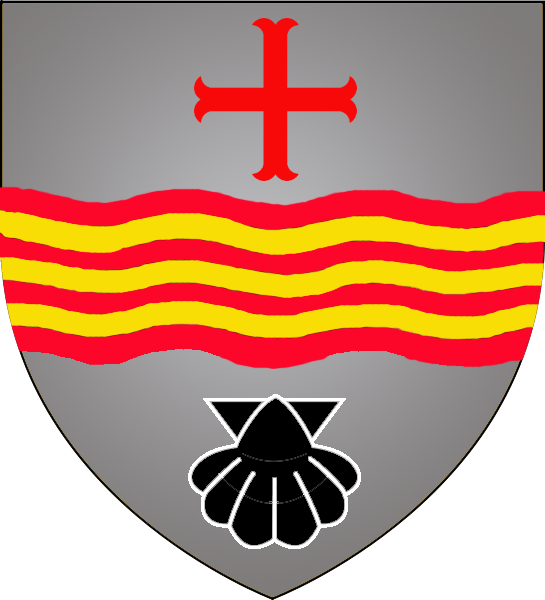
The Coat of Arms

=== Description ===
The Contern Coat of arms is "Argent a fess wavy Gules charged with three triangles also wavy Or, said fess accompanied in chief by a cross anchored Gules, at the base of a shell Sable."

The commune of Contern received its coat of arms on 26 July 1982. These are coats of arms in the shape of a shield divided into three parts, one for each village of the municipality.

- The upper part shows a cross derived from the coat of arms of the lords of Larochette who owned Contern from 1534 to 1731.
- The bars come from the coat of arms of the Grandpré family, lords of Roussy, who were the owners of the villages of Moutfort, Medingen and Pleitrange. The bars undulate to represent the River Syre which runs through the town.
- The lower part shows a shell derived from the coat of arms of the Metternich family to which Oetrange belonged.

=== Usage ===
The Contern Coat of arms is used all over the commune, on the flag, outside official buildings, even on the wheelie bins. Its distinctive looks and colour make it easy to spot.

== Shopping ==
Contern is home to a large number of small businesses. There is a Big-box store in the industrial zone. The other stores include drink shops and bakeries, among others. Contern also has a variety of hair salons and pharmacies. Most of these are concentrated around Moutfort. The commune is full of mixed use development.

== Culture, sport and leisure ==
Cultural centres include Chapel Street in Medingen, Moutfort Cultural and Sports Centre, Oetrange Cultural Centre, and "An Henks" Cultural Centre in Contern.

Seven monuments are dotted across the various towns of Contern. War memorials are in Contern itself, in Oetrange and in Moutfort. In Moutfort there is a monument to the liberators in Luxembourg, and in Oetrange there is a white bridge named Liberation Bridge. Smaller monuments are in the industrial zone and in Moutfort.

The Comic Strip Festival, known as BD Contern, was started by a man named Daniel Grun and has been ongoing since 1994. It was the first of its kind in the country.

Appelfest is an annual autumn festival that takes place in Contern, near the Gemeng or municipal administration.

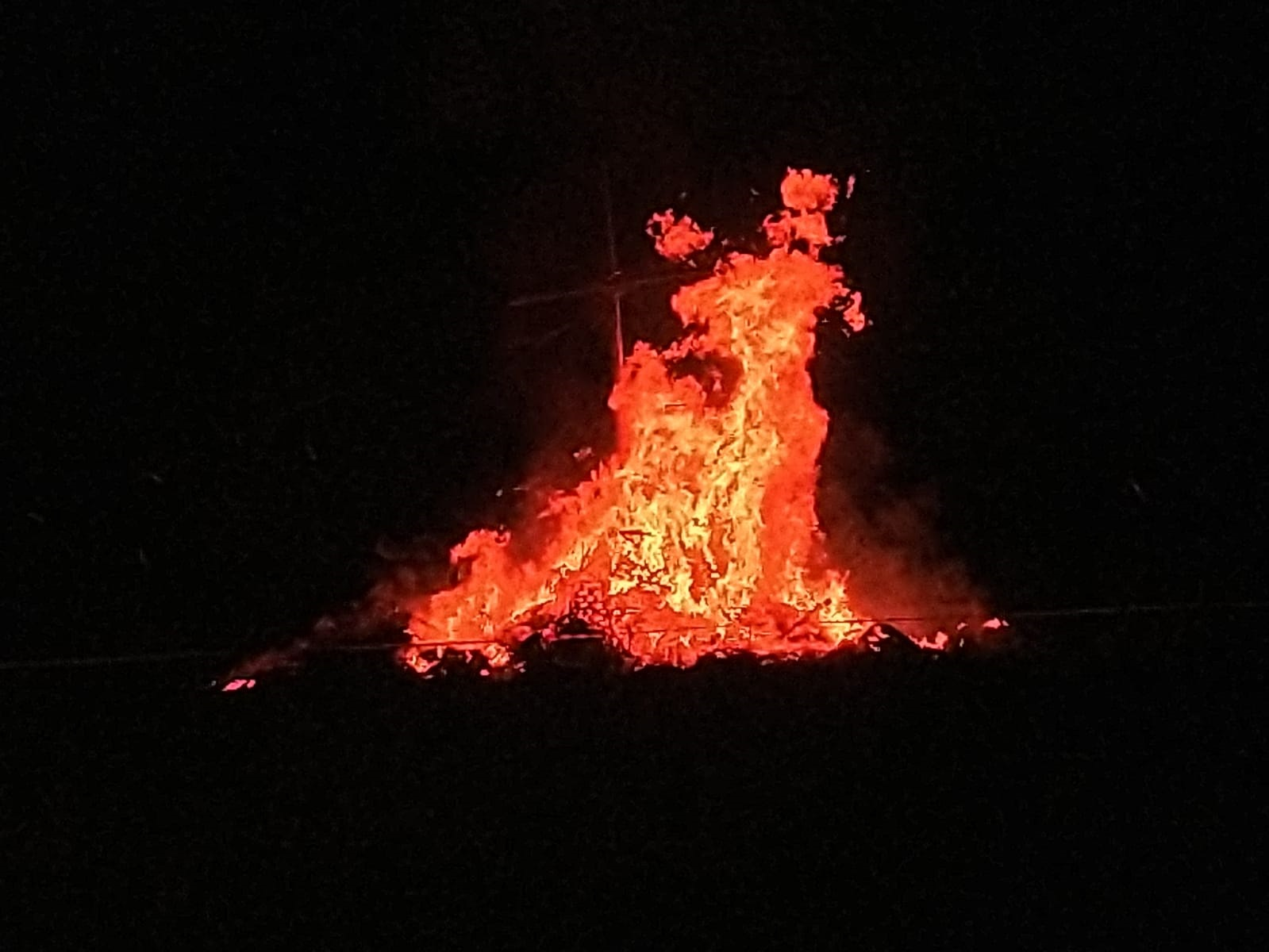
Buergbrennen 2022

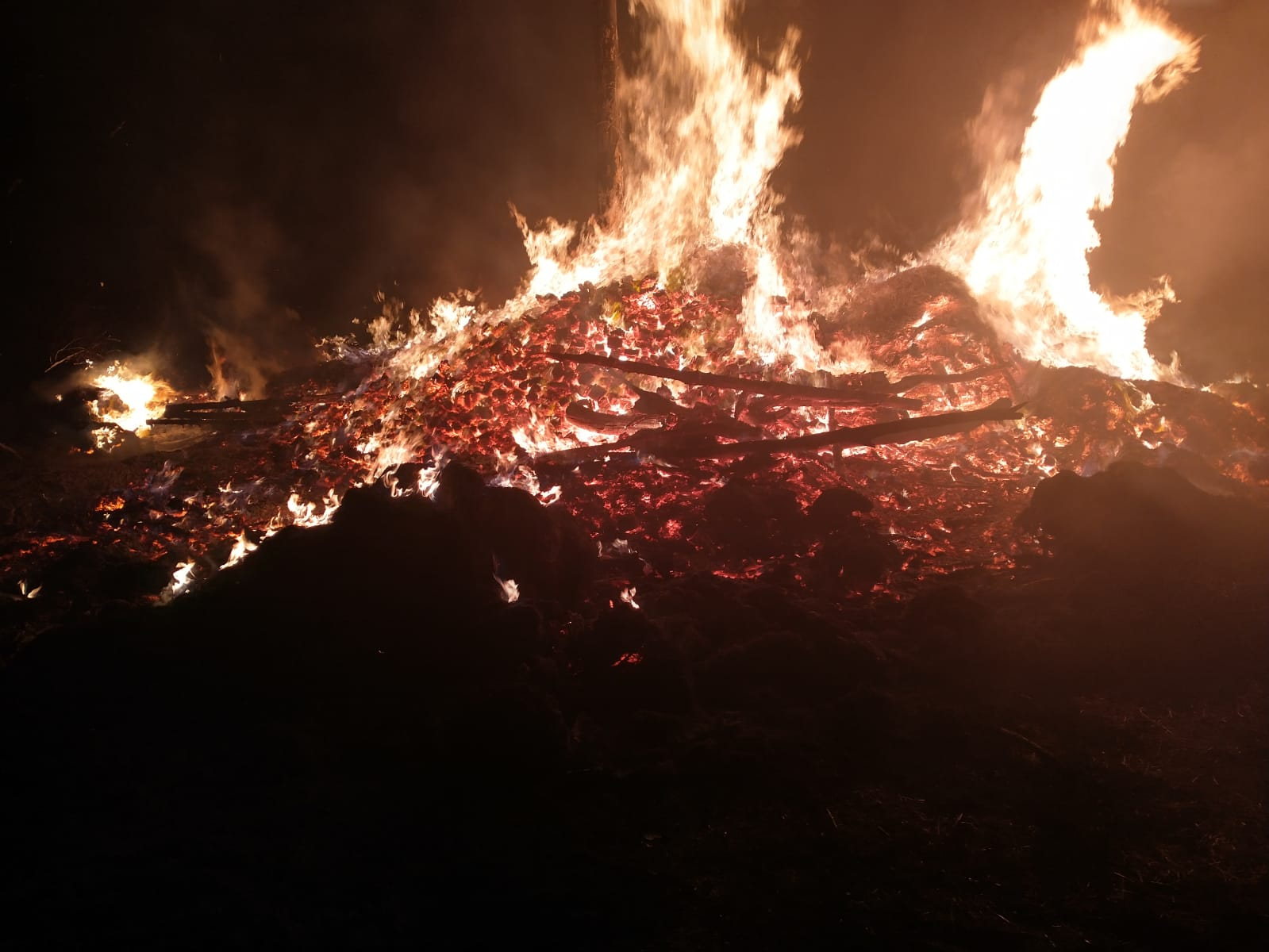
Close up of the Bonfire

Every year on the first Sunday in Lent, as in the rest of Luxembourg, Contern celebrates the Buergbrennen festival on a small trail near Hoehenhof. A large bonfire is made and the local residents are invited to a gathering. This is a historic tradition to "burn away the winter" and say hello to spring.

Many cultural events take place in Contern. For younger people there are a number of small play areas dotted around the commune. There is also the annual Christmas March in early December.

Local festivals and events in Contern include Integration Week, Day of Sporting and Cultural Merit, Environment Week, Commemoration Day and many more.

Seven auto pédestre hiking paths are mapped out by the commune.

Contern has many cycle paths that are part of regional or national itineries and unmarked gravel or paved paths which are mostly dedicated to cyclists. Except for tractors, motor vehicles are banned from these paths.

AB Contern is a semi-professional basketball team who have won the Luxembourg basketball League and cup on multiple occasions. There are a number of basketball courts and football fields within and just outside the commune. The "Union Sportif Moutfort-Medingen" or USMM is a children's football club established in 1937, which has a full size playing field at Moutfort.

Contern has public courts for Multisports and Petanque. The nearest swimming pool is outside of the commune, at Nideranven.

== Notable people ==
- Luc Frieden (born 1963) - Prime minister of Luxembourg since 2023; currently resides in Contern
- Elisabeth Margue (born 1990) Minister for Justice since 2023
