= Kréintgeshaff =

Kréintgeshaff Kroentgeshof/Croentgeshof
- Populated place/Lieu-dit
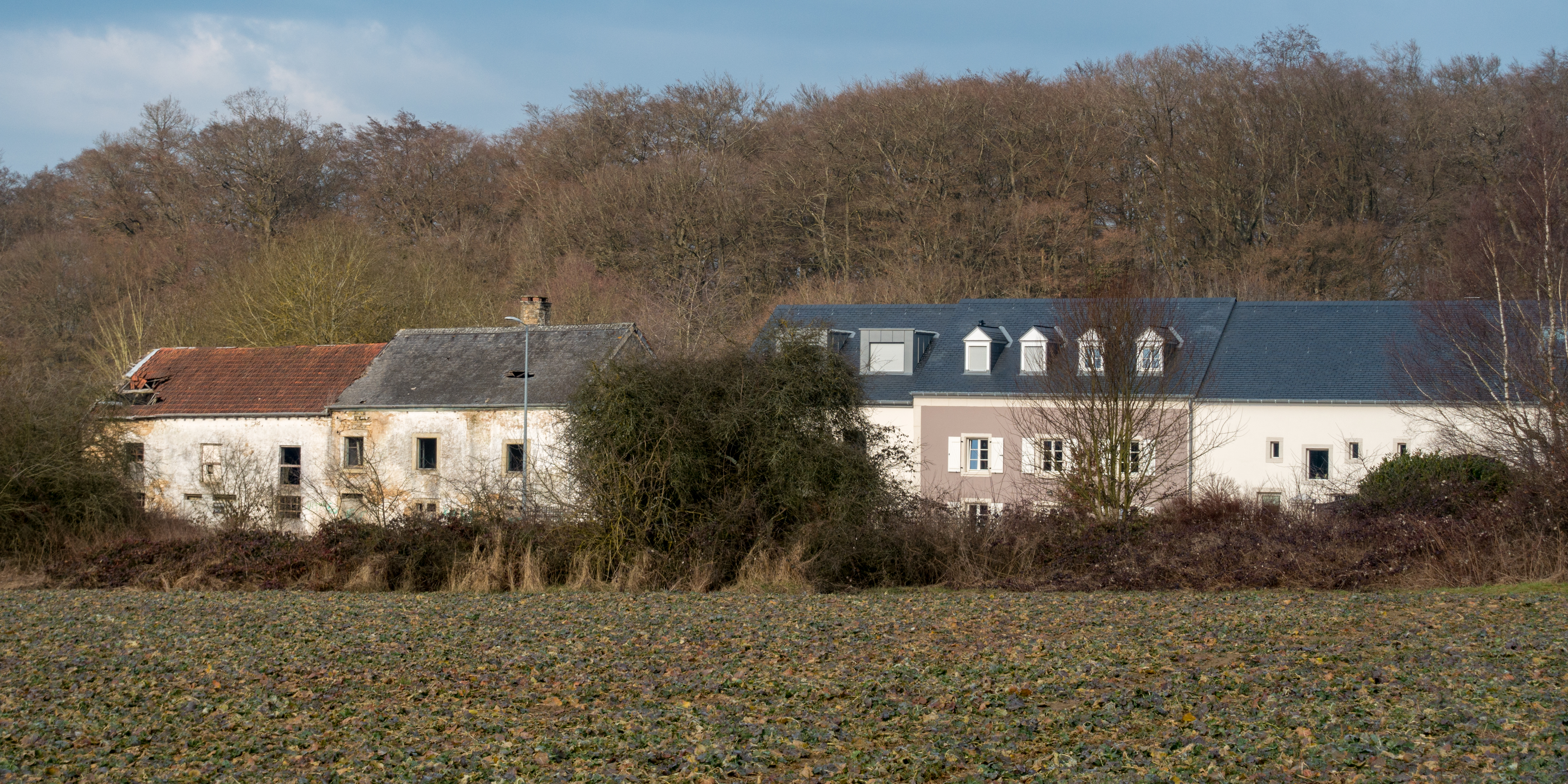
- Main street of Kréintgeshaff
- Interactive map of Kréintgeshaff
- Coordinates: 49.603°N 6.231°E
- Country: Luxembourg
- Canton: Canton Luxembourg
- Commune: Contern
- Locality: Contern
- Elevation: 330 m (1,080 ft)
- Time zone: UTC+1
  - Summer (DST): UTC+2
- Postal Code: 5324
- LAU 2: LU0000302

Kréintgeshaff (French: Kroentgeshof or Croentgeshof) is a locality near Sandweiler in the Commune of Contern in Luxembourg. It lies directly north-east of the Contern-Sandweiler Industrial zone and adjacent to the N2 main road which is part of European Route E29.

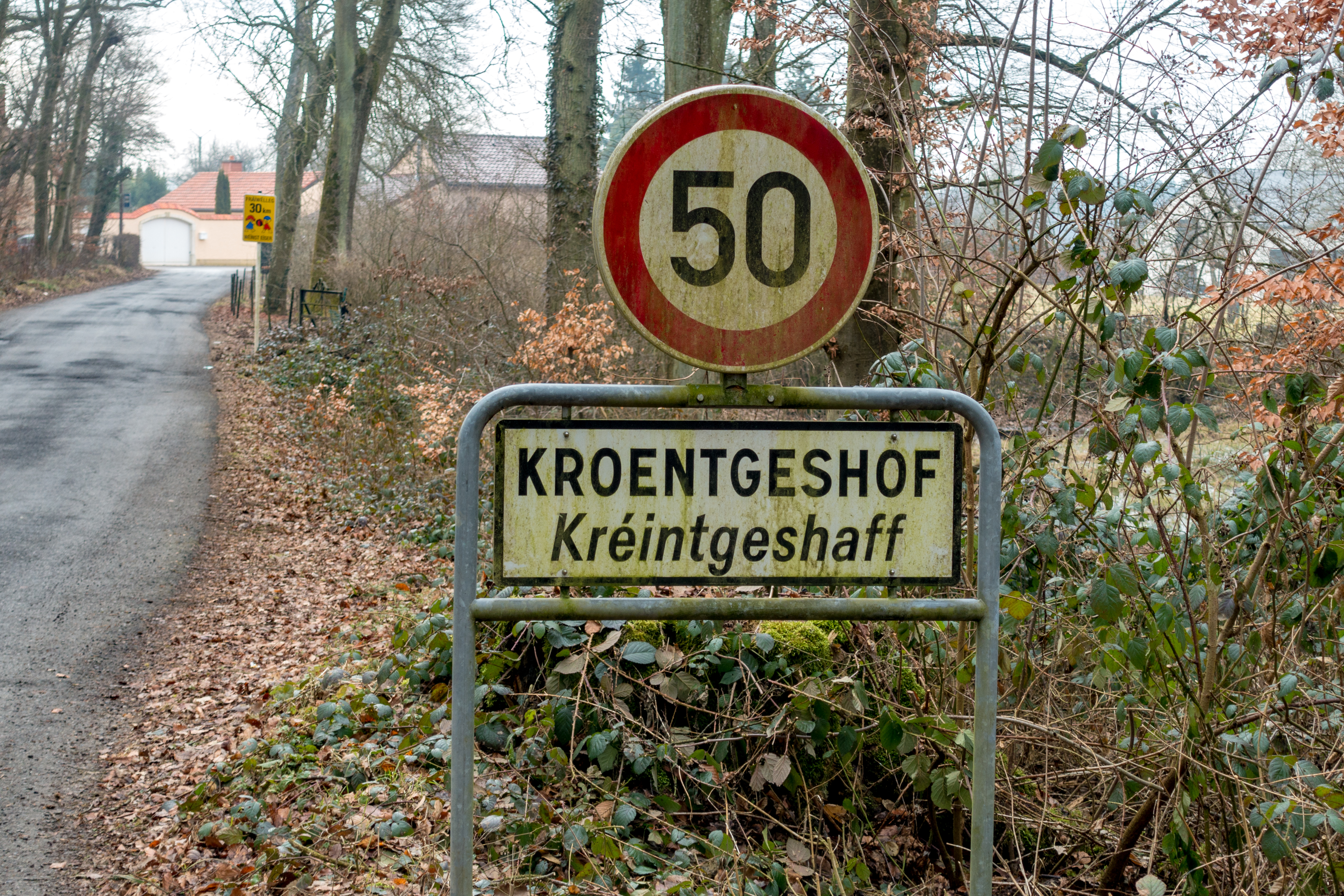
Sign for entering Kréintgeshaff

School buses run to and from the Um Ewent primary school in Contern but there is no public bus service.
