= Milbech =

Milbech Millbech
- Village
- Muhlbach
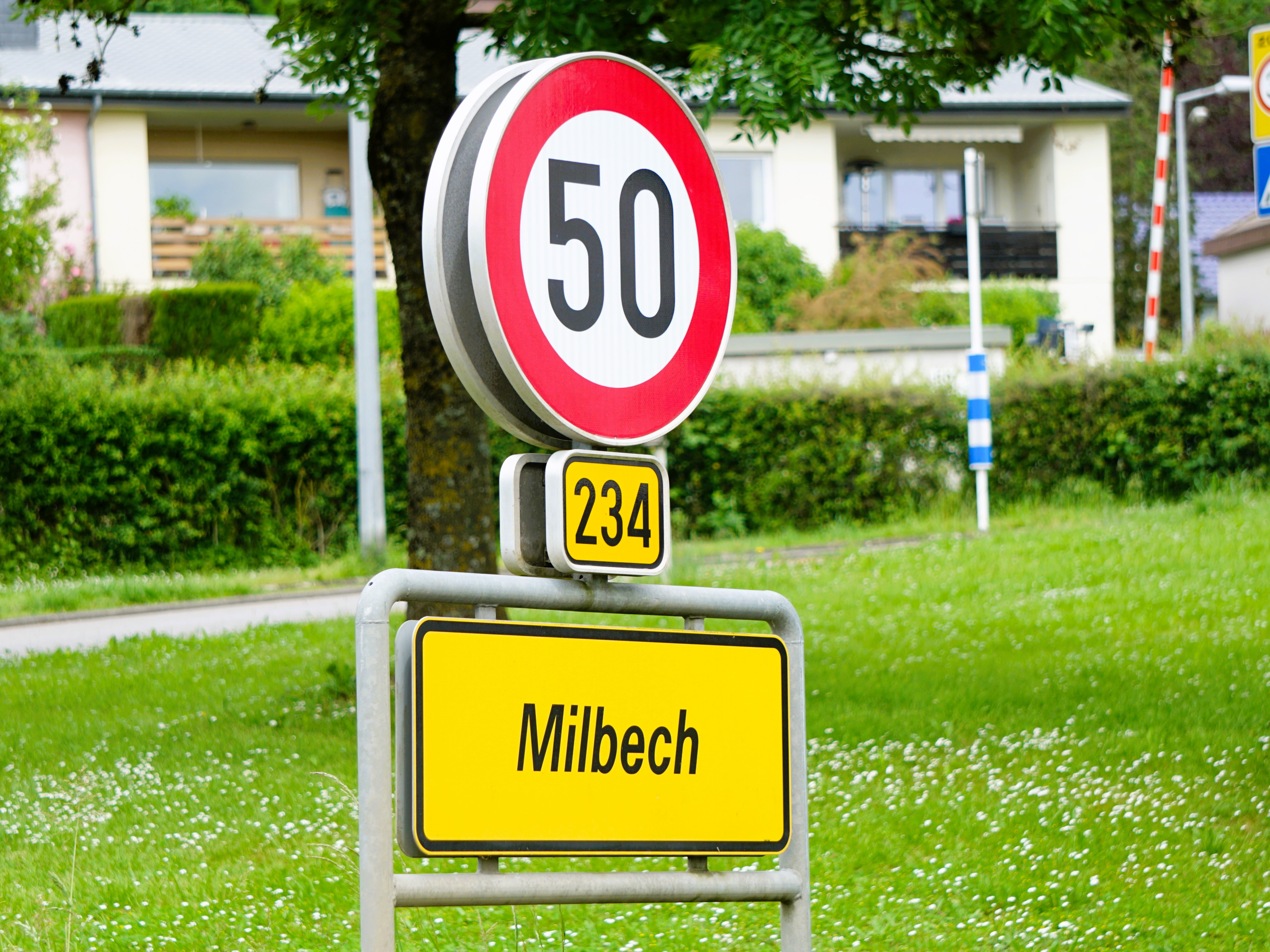

- Location within Luxembourg
- Coordinates: 49°35′16″N 6°14′46″E
- Country: Luxembourg
- Canton: Luxembourg District
- Commune: Contern
- Locality: Moutfort
- Elevation: 264.3 m (867 ft)
- Time zone: UTC+1
  - Summer (DST): UTC+2
- LAU 2: LU0000302

Milbech or Millbech (French: Muhlbach) is a village in the commune of Contern, in southern Luxembourg. As of 2005, the village has a population of 100. It is located directly adjacent to Moutfort, separated by a railway with the only links being a road bridge and a pedestrian foot-tunnel. Milbech is located 264.4 metres above sea level.

== History ==
The oldest mention of Milbech is on a map dating back to 1717 where it was written as Milbich, by 1778, the area now known as Milbech was made up of 2 settlements, Nehmuhl and Millbachen Millen, the latter of which is still regarded at the Moulin de Milbech. Milbech was first officially listed by its french name in 1905.

== Transport ==
Milbech is situated atop the CR234 main road which provides road access to the rest of Luxembourg. Milbech has a bus stop, named Milbech which is served by routine bus routes. Milbech is also not far from Oetrange railway station.
