= Itzig, Luxembourg =

Town in southern Luxembourg

Coordinates: 49°35′N 6°10′E

View from Itzig Plateau

View from Itzig Plateau

Itzig (German pronunciation: [ˈɪtsɪç]; Luxembourgish: Izeg) is a town in the commune of Hesperange, in southern Luxembourg. As of September 2026, the town has a population of 2,531.

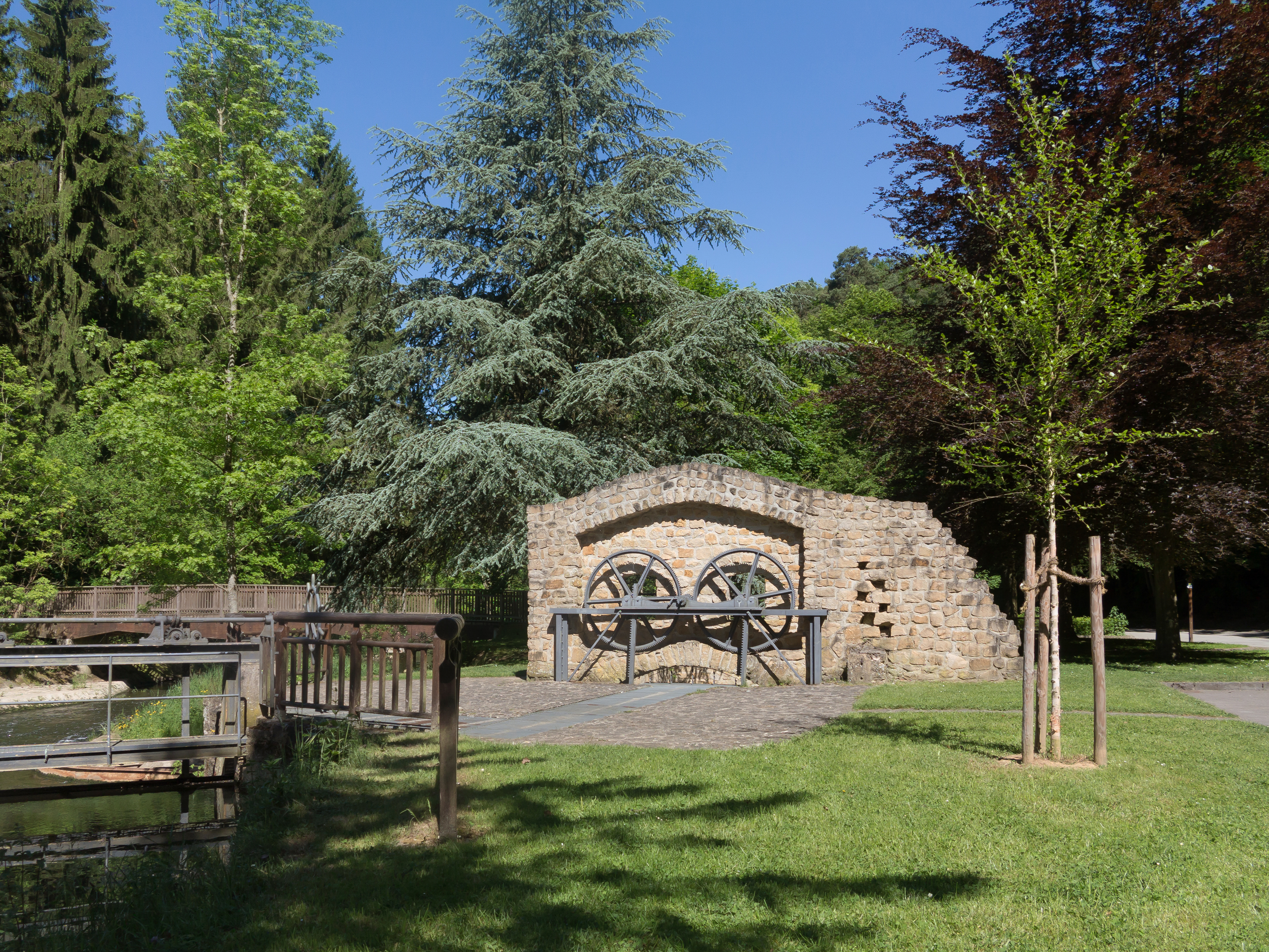
Itzig, watermill
