= Albert Sorel =

French historian

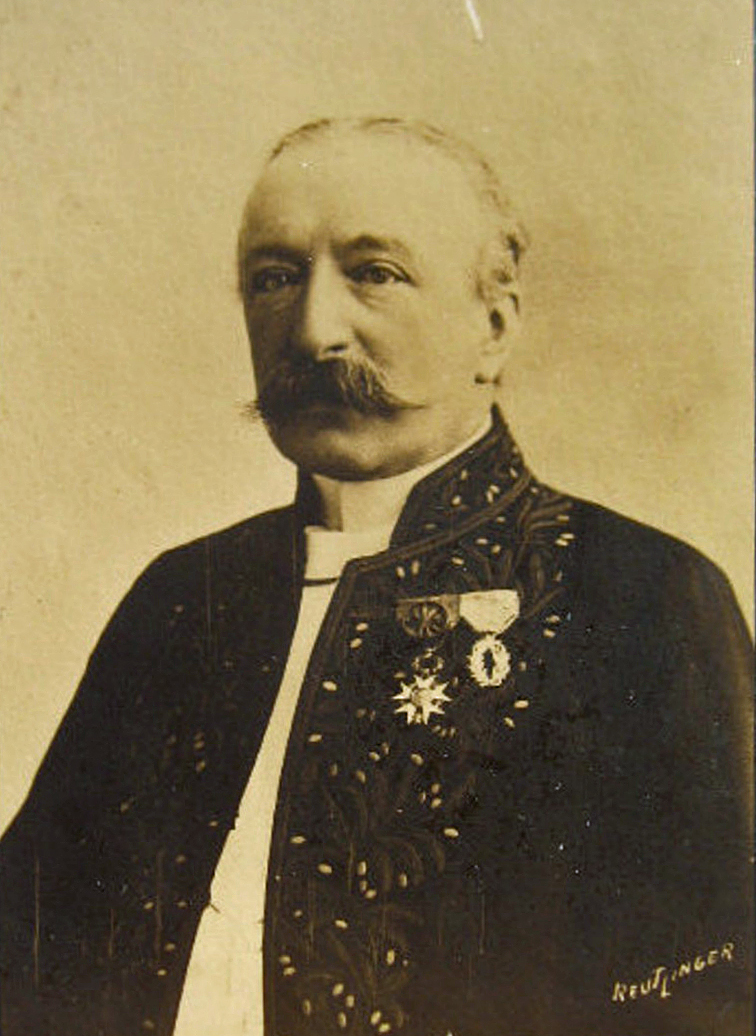
- Born: Albert Sorel; 13 August 1842; Honfleur, Calvados, Kingdom of France
- Died: 29 June 1906 (aged 63); Paris, French Third Republic
- Occupation: Historian
- Writing career
- Notable work: L'Europe et la revolution francaise

Albert Sorel (13 August 1842 – 29 June 1906) was a French historian. He was nominated for the Nobel Prize in Literature nine times.

== Life ==
He was born at Honfleur and remained throughout his life a lover of his native Normandy. His father, a rich manufacturer, wanted him to take over the business but his literary vocation prevailed. He went to live in Paris, where he studied law and, after a prolonged stay in Germany, entered the Foreign Office (1866). He had strongly developed literary and artistic tastes, was an enthusiastic musician (even composing a little), and wrote both poetry and novels (La Grande Falaise, 1785–1793, Le Docteur Egra in 1873); but he was not a socialite. He was the first cousin to the philosopher Georges Sorel.

== Academic life ==
Anxious to understand present as well as past events, he was above all a student. In 1870 he was chosen as secretary by M. de Chaudordy, who had been sent to Tours as a delegate in charge of the diplomatic side of the problem of national defence. He proved a most valuable collaborator, full of finesse, good temper, and excellent judgment, and at the same time hard-working and discreet. After the war, when Emile Boutmy founded the Ecole libre des sciences politiques (which later became the Institut d'Etudes Politiques de Paris or, as it is more widely known, Sciences Po). Sorel was appointed to teach diplomatic history (1872), a duty which he performed with striking success. Some of his courses were converted into books: Le traité de Paris du 20 novembre 1815 (1873); Histoire diplomatique de la guerre franco-allemande (1875); and the Précis du droit des gens which he published (1877) in collaboration with his colleague Theodore Funck-Brentano.

== Writings ==
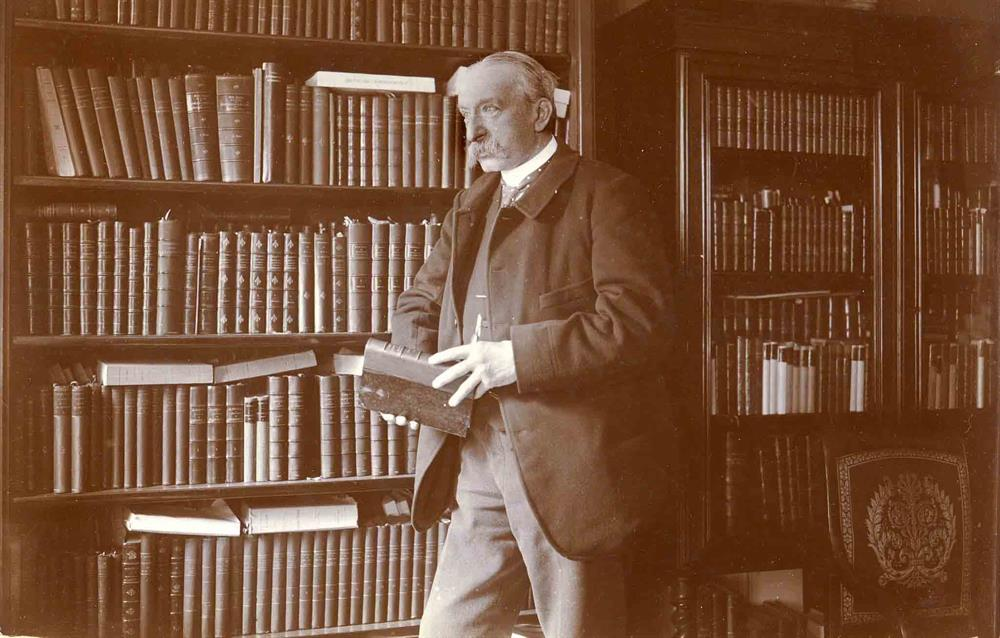
Albert Sorel in his library.

In 1875 Sorel left the Foreign Office and became general secretary to the newly created office of the Présidence du sénat. Here again, in a position where he could observe and review affairs, he performed valuable service, especially under the presidency of Audiffret-Pasquier, who was glad to have Sorel's advice in the most serious crises of internal politics. His duties left him, however, sufficient leisure to enable him to accomplish the great work of his life, L'Europe et la révolution française. His object was to repeat the work already done by Heinrich von Sybel but from a less restricted point of view and with a clearer and calmer understanding of the chessboard of Europe. He spent almost thirty years in the preparation and composition of the eight volumes of this diplomatic history; volume 1 appeared in 1885; volume 8 in 1904. Francis Herrick says, "it is still the best analysis of the European state system in the eighteenth century and the classic introduction to the study of revolutionary and Napoleonic diplomacy."

He was not merely a conscientious scholar; the analysis of the documents, mostly unpublished, on French diplomacy during the first years of the Revolution, which he published in the Revue historique (vol. v.-vii., x.-xiii.), shows with what scrupulous care he read the innumerable despatches which passed under his notice. He was also, and above all things, an artist. He drew men from the point of view of a psychologist as much as of a historian, observing them in their surroundings and being interested in showing how greatly they are slaves to the fatality of history. It was this fatality which led the rashest of the Conventionals to resume the tradition of the ancien régime, and caused the revolutionary propaganda to end in a system of alliances and annexations which carried on the work of Louis XIV. This view is certainly suggestive, but incomplete; it is largely true when applied to the men of the French Revolution, inexperienced or mediocre as they were, and incompetent to develop the enormous enterprises of Napoleon I.

== Literary works ==
Sorel's magnum opus, L'Europe et la revolution francaise (Europe and the French Revolution) was published in 8 volumes between 1885 and 1904. The 18th edition was published 1922-26, and the books were reprinted as facsimiles by Plon (1948), a German publisher (1974), and Tchou (2003). In 1928, extracts were published in English as Napoleon and the French Revolution, 1799-1814. Extracts from Albert Sorel's “L'Europe et la Revolution française” selected and edited by H. L. Hutton (Nelson, London, 1928, 178pp.).

The individual volumes are:

- v.1, Les mœurs politiques et les traditions. This is the only volume to have been translated fully into English. Francis H. Herrick's English translation of chapter 1 was published as Europe under the old regime (W. Ritchie, Los Angeles, 1947). The entire volume was translated by Alfred Cobban and Joseph Wray Hunt as Europe and the French Revolution; the political traditions of the Old Regime (Collins, London, 1969).
- v.2, La chute de la royauté;
- v.3, La guerre aux rois: 1792-1793;
- v.4, Les limites naturelles: 1794-1795;
- v.5, Bonaparte et le Directoire: 1795-1799;
- v.6, La trêve, Lunéville et Amiens: 1800-1805;
- v.7 Le blocus continental, le grand Empire: 1806-1812;
- v.8, La coalition, les traités de 1815: 1812-1815.

In the earlier volumes the reader is struck by the grandeur and relentless logic of the drama which the author unfolds. In the later volumes the reader may begin to have reservations, but the work is so complete and so powerfully constructed that it commands its audiences admiration. Side by side with this great general work, Sorel undertook various detailed studies more or less directly bearing on his subject. In La Question d'Orient au XVIII^{e} siècle, les origines de la triple alliance (1878), he shows how the partition of Poland on the one hand reversed the traditional policy of France in eastern Europe, and on the other hand contributed towards the salvation of republican France in 1793. In the Grands écrivains series he was responsible for Montesquieu (1887) and Mme de Staël (1891). The portrait which he draws of Montesquieu is all the more vivid for the intellectual affinities which existed between him and the author of the Lettres persanes (Persian Letters) and the Esprit des lois (The Spirit of the Laws).

Later, in Bonaparte et Hoche en 1797, he produced a critical comparison which is one of his most finished works (1896). In the Recueil des instructions données aux ambassadeurs he prepared vol. i. dealing with Austria (1884). Most of the articles which he contributed to various reviews and to the Temps newspaper have been collected into volumes: Essais d'histoire et de critique (1883), Lectures historiques (1894), Nouveaux essais d'histoire et de critique (1898), Etudes de littérature et d'histoire (1901). These writings contain a great deal of information and ideas not only about political men of the last two centuries but also about certain literary men and artists of Normandy. Honours came to him in abundance as an eminent writer and not as a public official. He was elected a member of the Académie des sciences morales et politiques (December 18, 1889) on the death of Fustel de Coulanges, and of the Académie française (1894) on the death of Hippolyte Taine.

=== Works ===
- La Grande Falaise, 1785-1793, novel (1872)
- Le Traité de Paris du 20 novembre 1815 (1872)
- Le Docteur Egra, novel (1873)
- Une soirée à Sèvres pendant la Commune (1873)
- Histoire diplomatique de la guerre franco-allemande. 2 volumes, issued for his course at l’École libre des sciences politiques. (1875)
- Précis du droit des gens, with Théophile Funck-Brentano. Text online at Gallica. (1876)
- La Question d’Orient au 18th century : le partage de la Pologne, le traité de Kaïnardji (1877)
- Sur l’enseignement de l’histoire diplomatique (1881)
- De l’origine des traditions nationales dans la politique extérieure de la France (1882)
- Essais d’histoire et de critique : Metternich, Talleyrand, Mirabeau, Élisabeth et Catherine II, l’Angleterre et l’émigration française, la diplomatie de Louis XV, les colonies prussiennes, l’alliance russe et la restauration, la politique française en 1866 et 1867, la diplomatie et le progrès. Text online at Gallica. (1883)
- Recueil des instructions données aux ambassadeurs et ministres de France depuis la paix de Westphalie jusqu’à la Révolution française : Autriche. Text online at Gallica (1884)
- L’Europe et la Révolution française, 8 vols. (1885-1904)
- Montesquieu. Text online at Gallica. (1887)
- Madame de Staël (1890)
- Lectures historiques : mémoires de soldats, le drame de Vincennes, Talleyrand et ses mémoires. Text online at Gallica. (1894)
- Bonaparte et Hoche en 1797 (1896)
- Nouveaux Essais d’histoire et de critique (1898)
- Études de littérature et d’histoire (1901)
- Introduction au livre du centenaire du Code civil (1904)
- Discours prononcés aux obsèques de Émile Boutmy, membre de l’Institut de France, fondateur-directeur de l’École libre des sciences politiques, le 28 janvier 1906. (1906). Funeral speeches by Léon Aucoc, Émile Gebhart, Étienne Hulot and Albert Sorel.
- Pages normandes (1907, posthumous)
- Vieux habits, vieux galons (1921, posthumous) Collection of short stories.

== Criticisms ==
Sorel's work, especially on the downfall of Napoleon, has come under much criticism recently by revisionist historians. His view was that Napoleon was legitimately fighting for the long-established French aim of 'natural frontiers' and that Napoleon merely inherited a foreign 'situation' and therefore did not create his own foreign policy, which has been contested by recent historians, such as Matthew MacLachlan and Michael Broers. They stressed that Napoleon was a nonconformist general and that his actions abroad did not conform with any traditional French foreign policy.

== Later years ==
His speeches on his two illustrious predecessors show how keenly sensible he was of beauty and how unbiased was his judgment, even in the case of those whom he most esteemed and loved. He had just obtained the great Prix Osiris of 100,000 francs, conferred for the first time by the Institut de France, when he was stricken with his last illness and died at Paris. He was associated with Turkish poets like Yahya Kemal Beyatlı and the historian Yusuf Akçura.
