= Epistolary novel =

Novel written as a series of letters

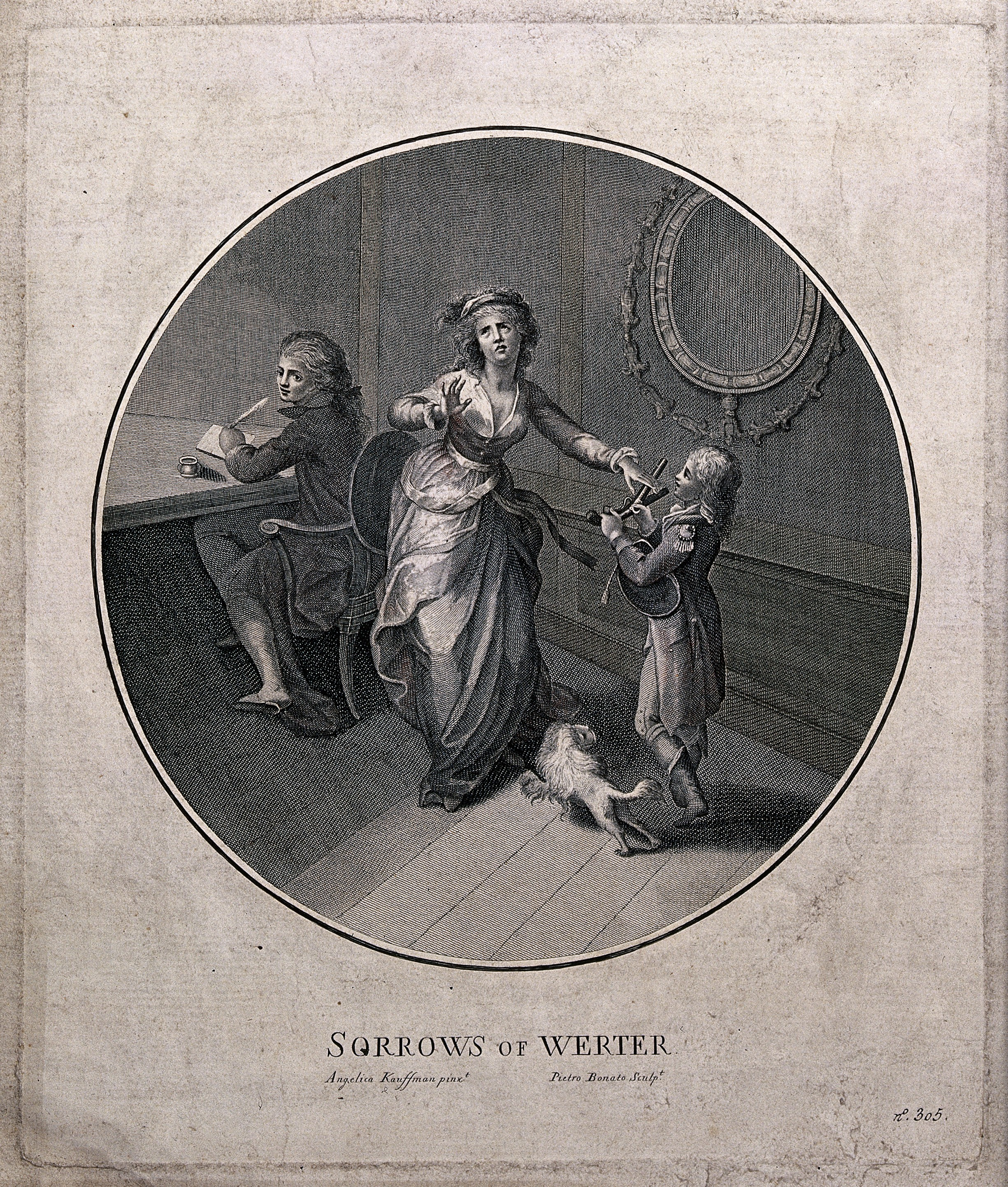
Young Werther's love interest hands over the fatal instrument for his suicide, the climax of Goethe's Sorrows of Young Werther

An epistolary novel (/ɪˈpɪstəlɛri/) is a novel written as a series of letters between the fictional characters of a narrative. The term is often extended to cover novels that intersperse other kinds of fictional document with the letters, most commonly diary entries and newspaper clippings, and sometimes considered to include novels composed of documents even if they do not include letters at all. More recently, epistolaries may include electronic documents such as recordings and radio, blog posts, and emails. The word epistolary is derived from Latin from the Greek word epistolē (ἐπιστολή), meaning a letter. This type of fiction is also sometimes known by the German term Briefroman (which literally means "letter novel") or more generally as epistolary fiction.

The epistolary form can be seen as adding greater realism to a story, due to the text existing diegetically within the lives of the characters. It is in particular able to demonstrate differing points of view without recourse to the device of an omniscient narrator. An important strategic device in the epistolary novel for creating the impression of authenticity of the letters is the fictional editor.

== Early works ==
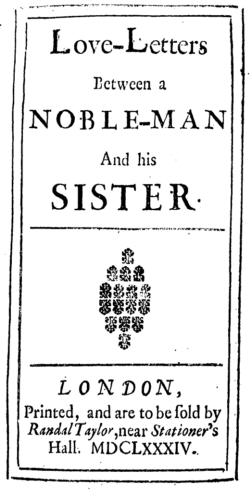
Title page of Aphra Behn's early epistolary novel, Love-Letters Between a Nobleman and His Sister (1684)

There are two theories on the genesis of the epistolary novel. The first claims that the genre originated from novels with inserted letters, in which the portion containing the third-person narrative in between the letters was gradually reduced. The other theory claims that the epistolary novel arose from miscellanies of letters and poetry: some of the letters were tied together into a (mostly amorous) plot. There is evidence to support both claims. The first truly epistolary novel, the Spanish "Prison of Love" (Cárcel de amor) (c. 1485) by Diego de San Pedro, belongs to a tradition of novels in which a large number of inserted letters already dominated the narrative. Other well-known examples of early epistolary novels are closely related to the tradition of letter-books and miscellanies of letters. Within the successive editions of Edmé Boursault's Letters of Respect, Gratitude and Love (Lettres de respect, d'obligation et d'amour) (1669), a group of letters written to a girl named Babet were expanded and became more and more distinct from the other letters, until it formed a small epistolary novel entitled Letters to Babet (Lettres à Babet). The immensely famous Letters of a Portuguese Nun (Lettres portugaises) (1669) generally attributed to Gabriel-Joseph de La Vergne, comte de Guilleragues, though a small minority still regard Marianna Alcoforado as the author, is claimed to be intended to be part of a miscellany of Guilleragues prose and poetry. The founder of the epistolary novel in English is said by many to be James Howell (1594–1666) with "Familiar Letters" (1645–50), who writes of prison, foreign adventure, and the love of women.

It has been argued that the first work to fully utilize the potential of an epistolary novel may have been Love-Letters Between a Nobleman and His Sister. This work was published anonymously in three volumes (1684, 1685, and 1687), and has been attributed to Aphra Behn though its authorship remains disputed in the 21st century. The novel shows the genre's results of changing perspectives: individual points were presented by the individual characters, and the central voice of the author and moral evaluation disappeared (at least in the first volume; further volumes introduced a narrator). The author furthermore explored a realm of intrigue with complex scenarios such as letters that fall into the wrong hands, faked letters, or letters withheld by protagonists.

=== 18th century to modern era ===
The epistolary novel as a genre became popular in the 18th century in the works of such authors as Samuel Richardson, with his immensely successful novels Pamela (1740) and Clarissa (1749). John Cleland's early erotic novel Fanny Hill (1748) is written as a series of letters from the titular character to an unnamed recipient. In France, there was Lettres persanes (1721) by Montesquieu, followed by Julie, ou la nouvelle Héloïse (1761) by Jean-Jacques Rousseau, and Choderlos de Laclos' Les Liaisons dangereuses (1782), which used the epistolary form to great dramatic effect, because the sequence of events was not always related directly or explicitly. In Germany, there was Johann Wolfgang von Goethe's The Sorrows of Young Werther (Die Leiden des jungen Werther) (1774) and Friedrich Hölderlin's Hyperion. The first Canadian novel, The History of Emily Montague (1769) by Frances Brooke, and twenty years later the first American novel, The Power of Sympathy (1789) by William Hill Brown, were both written in epistolary form.

Starting in the 18th century, the epistolary form was subject to much ridicule, resulting in a number of savage burlesques. The most notable example of these was Henry Fielding's Shamela (1741), written as a parody of Pamela. In it, the female narrator can be found wielding a pen and scribbling her diary entries under the most dramatic and unlikely of circumstances. Oliver Goldsmith used the form to satirical effect in The Citizen of the World, subtitled "Letters from a Chinese Philosopher Residing in London to his Friends in the East" (1760–61). So did the diarist Fanny Burney in a successful comic first novel, Evelina (1788).

The epistolary novel became less popular after the 18th century. Although Jane Austen tried the epistolary in juvenile writings and her novella Lady Susan (1794), she abandoned this structure for her later work. It is thought that her lost novel First Impressions, which was redrafted to become Pride and Prejudice, may have been epistolary: Pride and Prejudice contains an unusual number of letters quoted in full and some play a critical role in the plot.

The epistolary form nonetheless saw continued use, surviving in exceptions or in fragments in nineteenth-century novels. In Honoré de Balzac's novel Letters of Two Brides, two women who became friends during their education at a convent correspond over a 17-year period, exchanging letters describing their lives. Mary Shelley employs the epistolary form in her novel Frankenstein (1818). Shelley uses the letters as one of a variety of framing devices, as the story is presented through the letters of a sea captain and scientific explorer attempting to reach the north pole who encounters Victor Frankenstein and records the dying man's narrative and confessions. Published in 1848, Anne Brontë's novel The Tenant of Wildfell Hall is framed as a retrospective letter from one of the main heroes to his friend and brother-in-law with the diary of the eponymous tenant inside it. In the late 19th century, Bram Stoker released one of the most widely recognized and successful novels in the epistolary form to date, Dracula. Printed in 1897, the novel is compiled entirely of letters, diary entries, newspaper clippings, telegrams, doctor's notes, ship's logs, and the like. The novel also incorporates phonograph recordings, most notably Dr. John Seward's diary, which is dictated onto wax cylinders and later transcribed. This use of contemporary recording technology extends the epistolary form beyond written correspondence.

The biographic stylings of the Sherlock Holmes adventures by Arthur Conan Doyle have led to the tradition of a "Sherlockian game" among the Sherlock Holmes fandom, where fans discuss the supposed writings of Dr. Watson as though they were a genuine account of a real detective for whom Doyle only acted as a literary agent.

== Types ==
Epistolary novels can be categorized based on the number of people whose letters are included. This gives three types of epistolary novels: monophonic (giving the letters of only one character, like Letters of a Portuguese Nun and The Sorrows of Young Werther), dialogic (giving the letters of two characters, like Mme Marie Jeanne Riccoboni's Letters of Fanni Butler (1757), and polyphonic (with three or more letter-writing characters, such as in Bram Stoker's Dracula).

A crucial element in polyphonic epistolary novels like Clarissa and Dangerous Liaisons is the dramatic device of 'discrepant awareness': the simultaneous but separate correspondences of the heroines and the villains creating dramatic tension. They can also be classified according to their type and quantity of use of non-letter documents, though this has obvious correlations with the number of voices – for example, newspaper clippings are unlikely to feature heavily in a monophonic epistolary and considerably more likely in a polyphonic one.

== Notable works ==
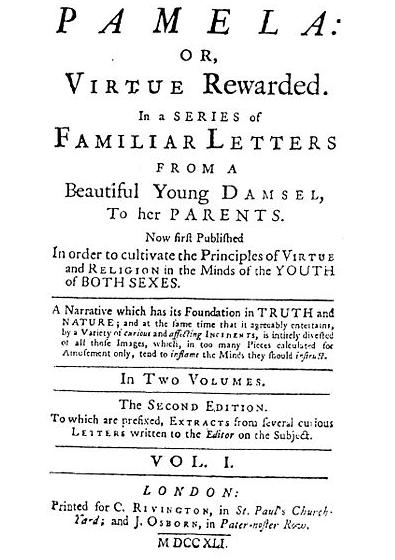
Title page of the second edition of Samuel Richardson's epistolary novel Pamela; or, Virtue Rewarded (1740), a bestselling early epistolary novel

The epistolary novel form has continued to be used after the eighteenth century.

=== Eighteenth century ===
- Lettres persanes, a 1721 novel by Montesquieu.
- Pamela; or, Virtue Rewarded, by Samuel Richardson 1740, a bestselling early epistolary novel which prompted artistic interest in the epistolary form.
- Clarissa, by Samuel Richardson 1748, Richardson's masterpiece and a milestone in epistolary writing.
- Evelina by Frances Burney, first published in 1778.
- Julie; or, The New Heloise, an epistolary novel by Jean-Jacques Rousseau, published in 1761.
- The Sorrows of Young Werther is a 1774 novel by Johann Wolfgang Goethe.
- Les Liaisons dangereuses is a 1782 French novel by Pierre Choderlos de Laclos, about the Marquise de Merteuil and the Vicomte de Valmont, two narcissistic rivals (and ex-lovers) who use seduction as a weapon to socially control and exploit others, all the while enjoying their cruel games and boasting about their talent for manipulation (also seen as depicting the corruption and depravity of the French nobility shortly before the French Revolution). The book is composed entirely of letters written by the various characters to each other.
- Cartas marruecas (Moroccan Letters), a 1789 novel by José Cadalso, Spanish author, poet, playwright and essayist.
- Marquis de Sade's Aline and Valcour (1795).

=== Nineteenth century ===
- Mary Shelley's Frankenstein (1818) uses a frame story written in the form of letters, with the main narrative being told as a first person account by the titular character.
- Fyodor Dostoevsky used the epistolary format for his first novel, Poor Folk (1846), as a series of letters between two friends, struggling to cope with their impoverished circumstances and life in Imperial-era Russia.
- The Tenant of Wildfell Hall (1848) by English author Anne Brontë is framed as a series of letters and diary entries.
- The Moonstone (1868) by Wilkie Collins uses a collection of various documents to construct a detective novel in English. In the second piece, a character explains that he is writing his portion because another had observed to him that the events surrounding the disappearance of the eponymous diamond might reflect poorly on the family, if misunderstood, and therefore he was collecting the true story. This is an unusual element, as most epistolary novels present the documents without questions about how they were gathered. He also used the form previously in The Woman in White (1859).
- Spanish foreign minister Juan Valera's Pepita Jiménez (1874) is written in three sections, the first and third being a series of letters, the middle part narrated by an unknown observer.
- Bram Stoker's Dracula (1897) uses not only letters and diaries, but also dictation cylinders and newspaper accounts.

=== Twentieth century ===
- Dorothy L. Sayers and Robert Eustace's The Documents in the Case (1930).
- E.M. Delafield's Diary of a Provincial Lady (1930).
- Kathrine Taylor's Address Unknown (1938) is an anti-Nazi novel in which the final letter is returned marked "Address Unknown", indicating the disappearance of the German character.
- C. S. Lewis used the epistolary form for The Screwtape Letters (1942), and considered writing a companion novel from an angel's point of view – though he never did so. It is less generally realized that his Letters to Malcolm: Chiefly on Prayer (1964) is a similar exercise, exploring theological questions through correspondence addressed to a fictional recipient, "Malcolm", though this work may be considered a "novel" only loosely in that developments in Malcolm's personal life gradually come to light and impact the discussion.
- Thornton Wilder's fifth novel Ides of March (1948) consists of letters and documents illuminating the last days of the Roman Republic.
- A. E. van Vogt's "Dear Pen Pal" (science fiction short story) (1949) is written as a series of letters of which the reader only sees the letters written to the unnamed protagonist.
- Saul Bellow's novel Herzog (1964) is largely written in letter format. These are both real and imagined letters, written by the protagonist Moses Herzog to family members, friends, and celebrities.
- Shūsaku Endō's novel Silence (1966) is an example of the epistolary form, half of which consists of letters from Rodrigues, the other half either in the third person or in letters from other persons.
- Daniel Keyes's short story and novel Flowers for Algernon (1959, 1966) take the form of a series of lab progress reports written by the main character as his treatment progresses, with his writing style changing correspondingly.
- The Anderson Tapes (1969, 1970) by Lawrence Sanders is a novel primarily consisting of transcripts of tape recordings.
- Stephen King's novel Carrie (1974) is partially written in an epistolary structure through newspaper clippings, magazine articles, letters, and book excerpts.
- Margaret Atwood's The Handmaid's Tale (1985) ends with the reveal that the narrative was a scholar's transcript of cassette tape recordings made by the protagonist Offred for an oral history, discussed in the meeting minutes of a far-future historical society.
- Alice Walker employed the epistolary form in The Color Purple (1982). The 1985 film adaptation echoes the form by incorporating into the script some of the novel's letters, which the actors deliver as monologues.
- John Updike's S. (1988) is an epistolary novel consisting of the heroine's letters and transcribed audio recordings.
- Patricia Wrede and Caroline Stevermer's Sorcery and Cecelia (1988) is an epistolary fantasy novel in a Regency setting from the first-person perspectives of cousins Kate and Cecelia, who recount their adventures in magic and polite society. Unusually for modern fiction, it is written using the style of the letter game.
- Avi's young-adult novel Nothing but the Truth (1991) uses only documents, letters, and conversation transcripts.
- Nick Bantock's Griffin and Sabine series, told through facsimiles of handwritten postcards and handwritten or typed letters between the two eponymous characters.
- Last Words from Montmartre (1995) by Qiu Miaojin is a novel written in the form of twenty letters that can be read in any order.
- Last Days of Summer (1998) by Steve Kluger is written in a series of letters, telegrams, therapy transcripts, newspaper clippings, and baseball box scores.
- The Perks of Being a Wallflower (1999) was written by Stephen Chbosky in the form of letters from an anonymous character to a secret role model of sorts.
- House of Leaves by Mark Z. Danielewski (2000) is written as a series of found footage film transcripts, essays, fictitious footnotes, and letters spread over several layers of metafiction.

=== Twenty-first century ===
- Between Friends by Debbie Macomber (2001) tells the story of a lifelong friendship between Jillian Lawton and Lesley Adamski from the 1950s to the early 2000s, using a combination of letters (later becoming emails) and daily paraphernalia like a gas station receipt.
- Mark Dunn's Ella Minnow Pea (2001) is a progressively lipogrammatic epistolary novel – the letters become increasingly more difficult to read as the lipogrammatic constraints are brought in, and this requires the reader to attempt to interpret what is being written.
- La silla del águila ("The Eagle's Throne") by Carlos Fuentes (2003) is a political satire written as a series of letters between persons in high levels of the Mexican government in 2020. The epistolary format is treated by the author as a consequence of necessity: the United States impedes all telecommunications in Mexico as a retaliatory measure, leaving letters and smoke signals as the only possible methods of communication, particularly ironic given one character's observation that "Mexican politicians put nothing in writing."
- We Need to Talk About Kevin by Lionel Shriver (2003) is a monologic epistolary novel written as a series of letters from Eva, Kevin's mother, to her husband Franklin.
- The Sluts (2004) by Dennis Cooper is composed of online posts, reviews and email correspondence. Each contributes to a central mystery, fuelled by competing narratives about an escort.
- The 2004 novel Cloud Atlas by David Mitchell tells a story in several time periods in a nested format, with some sections told in epistolary style, including an interview, journal entries and a series of letters.
- March (2005), by Geraldine Brooks, is a novel depicting the events of the protagonist's experiences during the American Civil War in 1862 through letters.
- World War Z: An Oral History of the Zombie War (2006), by Max Brooks, is a series of interviews from various survivors of a zombie apocalypse.
- Salmon Fishing in the Yemen (2007) by Paul Torday, is a series of letters, e-mails, interview transcripts, newspaper articles and other non-narrative media.
- The White Tiger (2008) by Aravind Adiga, winner of the 40th Man Booker Prize in 2008, is a novel in the form of letters written by an Indian villager to the Chinese Premier Wen Jiabao.
- The Guernsey Literary and Potato Peel Pie Society (2008), by Mary Ann Shaffer and Annie Barrows, is written as a series of letters and telegraphs sent and received by the protagonist.
- A Visit from the Goon Squad (2010) by Jennifer Egan has parts which are epistolary in nature. One chapter is written as a report of a celebrity interview, and another as a PowerPoint presentation.
- Where'd You Go, Bernadette (2012) by Maria Semple is told in a series of documents such as emails, memos and transcripts.
- Illuminae (2015), by Jay Kristoff and Amie Kaufman, is told exclusively through a series of classified documents, censored emails, interviews, and others.
- This Is How You Lose the Time War (2019) by is a science fiction novel by Amal El-Mohtar and Max Gladstone. The communication modalities are science fictional in nature and not literal letters.
- The Correspondent (2025) by Virginia Evans is an epistolary novel which follows the letters of a retired lawyer in her seventies over the course of 10 years of her life. It was awarded the Women's Prize for Fiction in 2026.

== See also ==
- Epistolary poem
- Epistolography
- Found footage (film technique)
- Letter collection
