= Noël Bouton de Chamilly =

French military commander

Noël Bouton
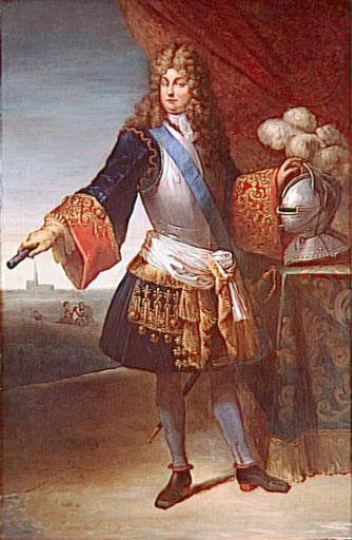
- Le maréchal de Chamilly by François-Joseph Heim (1835)
- Born: April 6, 1636
- Died: January 8, 1715 (aged 78); Paris, France
- Military career
- Allegiance: Kingdom of France
- Branch: French Army
- Rank: Marshal of France
- Unit: Régiment de Condé-Cavalerie
- Conflicts: Portuguese Restoration War; Franco-Dutch War; War of Devolution; Nine Years' War; War of the Spanish Succession
- Awards: Order of the Holy Spirit

Noël Bouton, Marquis de Chamilly (6 April 1636 – 8 January 1715) was a French military commander of the 17th and 18th centuries. He was named a Marshal of France in 1703.

== Biography ==
His first battle was the Battle of Valenciennes (1656) under Marshal de la Ferté.

In 1663, he followed Marshal de Schomberg to Portugal and served four years under his command, taking part in all the actions of the Portuguese Restoration War, notably at the Battle of Montes Claros as a captain. He commanded a cavalry regiment in 1667, and after the peace Treaty of Lisbon (1668), he followed the Duke de la Feuillade to Crete where he was seriously wounded during the Siege of Candia.

Upon his return, he joined his brother, the Count of Chamilly, who commanded an army corps in Luxembourg, where he was made colonel of the Burgundy Regiment. He took part in the Franco-Dutch War, where he distinguished himself in Siege of Grave (1674) On 18 December of that same year, he was appointed brigadier general and governor of Oudenaarde. Wounded twice at the sieges of Ghent and Ypres (1676), he was made lieutenant general in 1678.

After the war, he became Government of Freiburg in 1679, and of Strasbourg in 1685. He served as lieutenant general in the Army of Germany in 1691 and commanded the attack on Heidelberg, which was taken sword in hand.

In 1701, the king entrusted him with the command of the provinces of Poitou, Aunis, and Saintonge, where he still commanded in 1702. The following year, the King appointed him Marshal of France on 14 January 1703. He was made a Knight of the Order of the Holy Spirit on 2 February 1705, and died in Paris on 8 January 1715, in his 79th year, without issue.

=== Letters of a Portuguese Nun ===
In 1669, a very popular book was published called Letters of a Portuguese Nun, which were translated in several languages. They were supposed to have been written by a Portuguese Nun called Mariana Alcoforado to her lover, the young Noël Bouton de Chamilly, who was indeed fighting in Portugal at that time. However, since the 20th century, most literary scholars consider the letters to be fiction, invented by Gabriel de Guilleragues.

== Sources ==
- de Quincy, Jacques (1726). Histoire militaire du règne de Louis le Grand (in French). Vol. 4. Paris.
