= Schrassig Prison =

Prison in Luxembourg

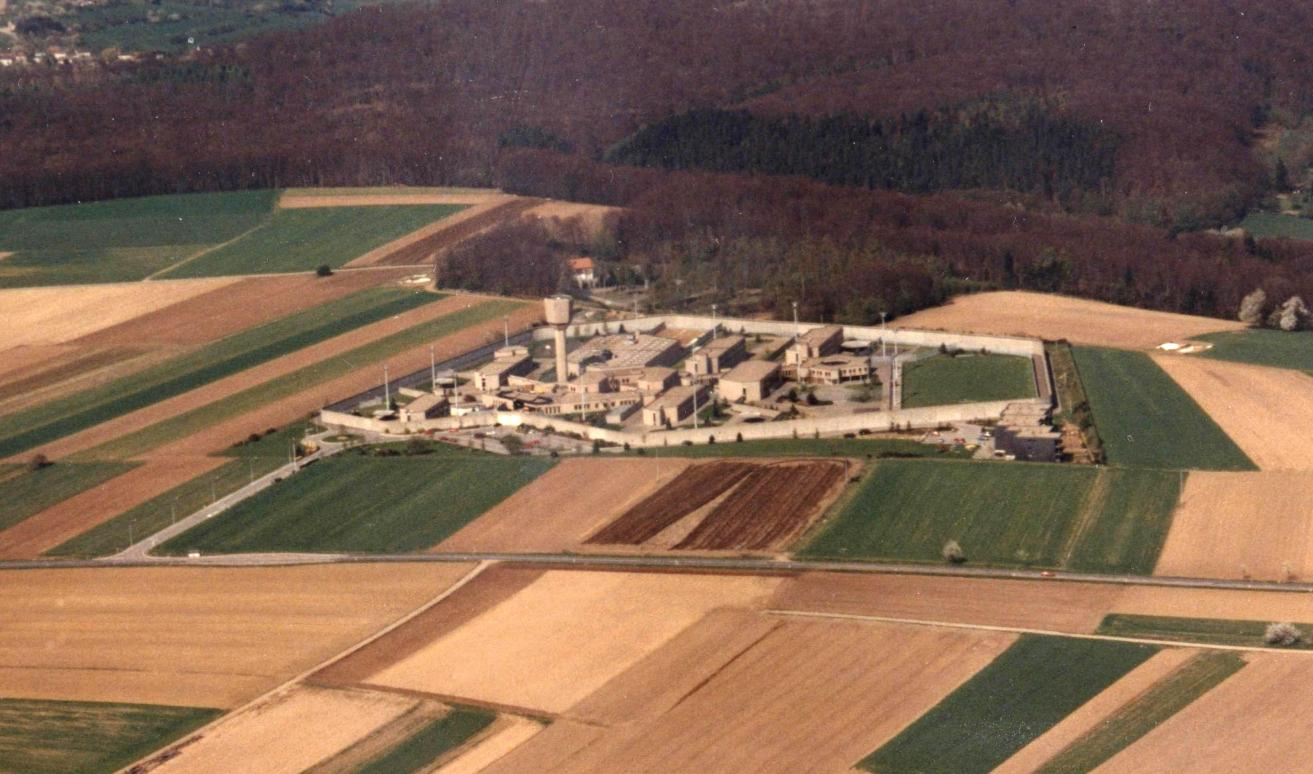
- View of Schrassig Prison (1992)
- Interactive map of Schrassig Prison
- Location: Schrassig, Luxembourg
- Status: Operational
- Security class: Minimum to Maximum
- Capacity: 600
- Population: 588 (2012)
- Opened: 1984

Schrassig Prison (Officially:"Centre pénitentiaire de Schrassig") is the only closed penitentiary in Luxembourg. The prison is located near the towns of Schrassig, Sandweiler and Oetrange and is built upon land belonging to the commune of Schuttrange.

The prison opened in 1984 after 6 years of construction and replaced the prison in Grund, Luxembourg. It was overcrowded within 3 years. During the 1990s the institution was extended, but remained overcrowded. The prison was further extended in March 2007 to allow for a capacity of up to 600 prisoners, and was occupied by 680 prisoners including 37 women.

The prison's population fell between 2007 and 2008. September 2008 there were 596 prisoners incarcerated in Schrassig prison including 26 women. In the year 2012 there were on average 588 prisoners incarcerated (558 men and 30 women)

In addition to the prison in Schrassig, Luxembourg has an open prison located in Givenich.

== In the media ==
The overcrowding of the prison is a recurrent topic in the Luxembourgish press.

Schrassig prison was the set for the Luxembourgish film Back in Trouble (1997) featuring Moritz Bleibtreu, and directed by Andy Bausch.
