= Schuttrange =

Schuttrange Schëtter
- Commune
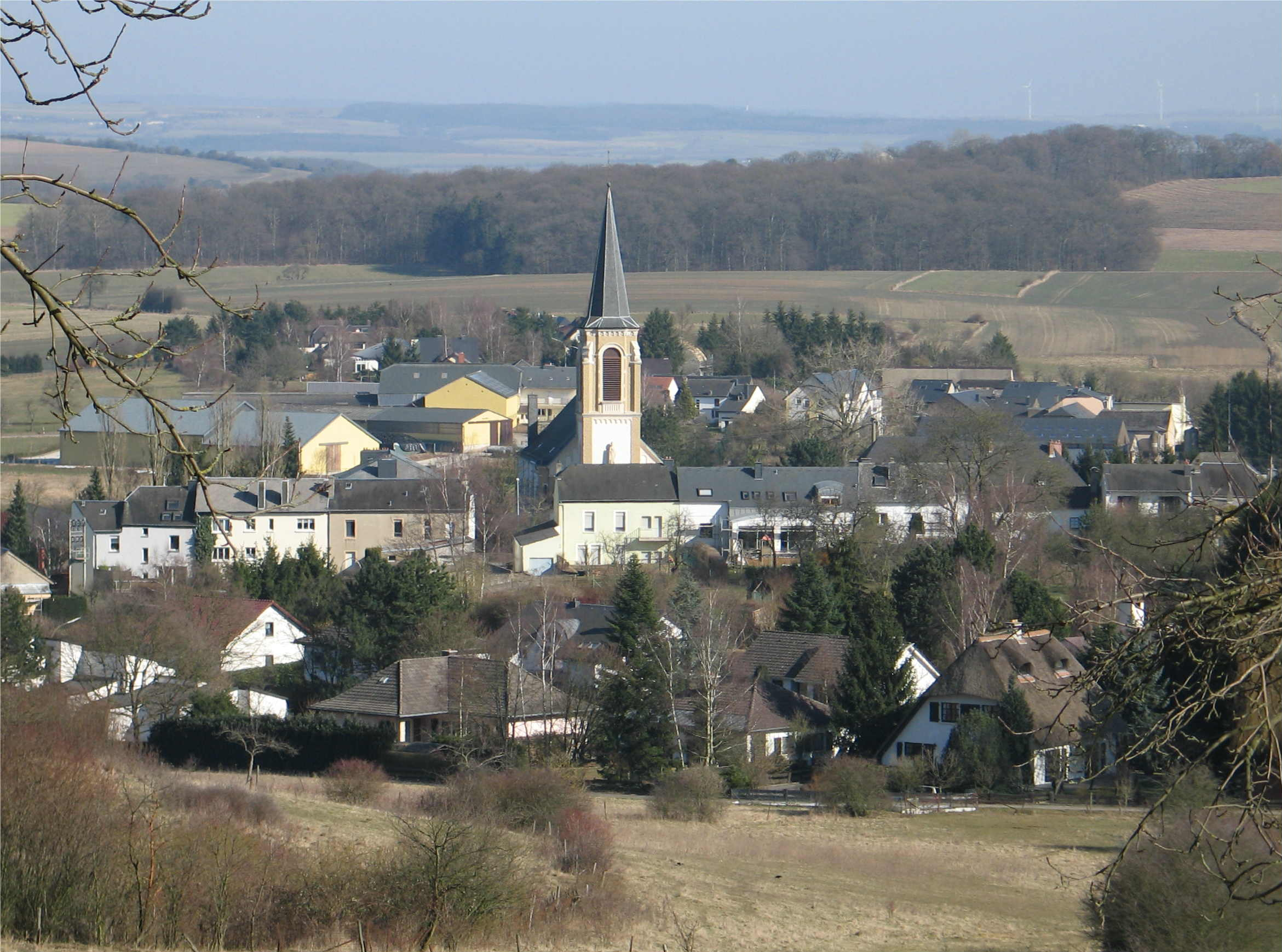

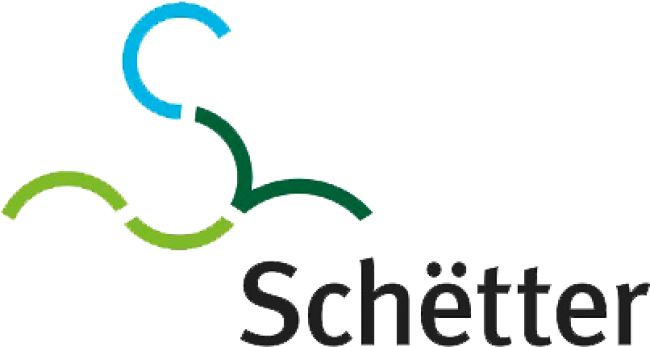
- Coat of arms Brandmark

- Map of Luxembourg with Schuttrange highlighted in orange, and the canton in dark red
- Coordinates: 49.6208°N 6.2722°E
- Country: Luxembourg
- Canton: Luxembourg

Government
  - Mayor: Claude Marson

Area
  - Total: 16.1 km^{2} (6.2 sq mi)
  - Rank: 71st of 100
- Highest elevation: 373 m (1,224 ft)
  - Rank: 71st of 100
- Lowest elevation: 241 m (791 ft)
  - Rank: 47th of 100

Population (2026)
  - Total: 4,453
  - Rank: 43rd of 100
  - Density: 277/km^{2} (716/sq mi)
  - Rank: 30th of 100
- Time zone: UTC+1 (CET)
  - Summer (DST): UTC+2 (CEST)
- LAU 2: LU0000307
- Website: schuttrange.lu

Schuttrange (French pronunciation: [ʃytʁɑ̃ʒ]; Luxembourgish: Schëtter [ˈʃətɐ]; German: Schüttringen [ˈʃʏtʁɪŋən]) is a commune and small town in southern Luxembourg. It is located east of Luxembourg City.

As of September 2026, the town of Schuttrange, which lies in the centre of the commune, has a population of 1,795. Other towns within the commune include Munsbach, Neuhäusgen, Schrassig, and Übersyren.

== Notable people ==
- Frantz Funck-Brentano (1862–1947), a French historian and librarian; born in Munsbach Castle
- Heng Freylinger (1926–2017), a Luxembourgish wrestler.

== Population ==
Historical population

Year	Pop.	±%
1821	813	—
1851	1,055	+29.8%
1900	863	−18.2%
1910	937	+8.6%
1922	998	+6.5%
1935	1,006	+0.8%

Year	Pop.	±%
1947	1,051	+4.5%
1960	1,055	+0.4%
1970	1,224	+16.0%
1981	1,738	+42.0%
1990	2,151	+23.8%
2000	3,258	+51.5%

Year	Pop.	±%
2005	3,298	+1.2%
2010	3,534	+7.2%
2015	4,033	+14.1%
2020	4,274	+6.0%
2021	4,272	−0.0%

Source data
