= Neuhäusgen =

Coordinates: 49.625°N 6.236°E

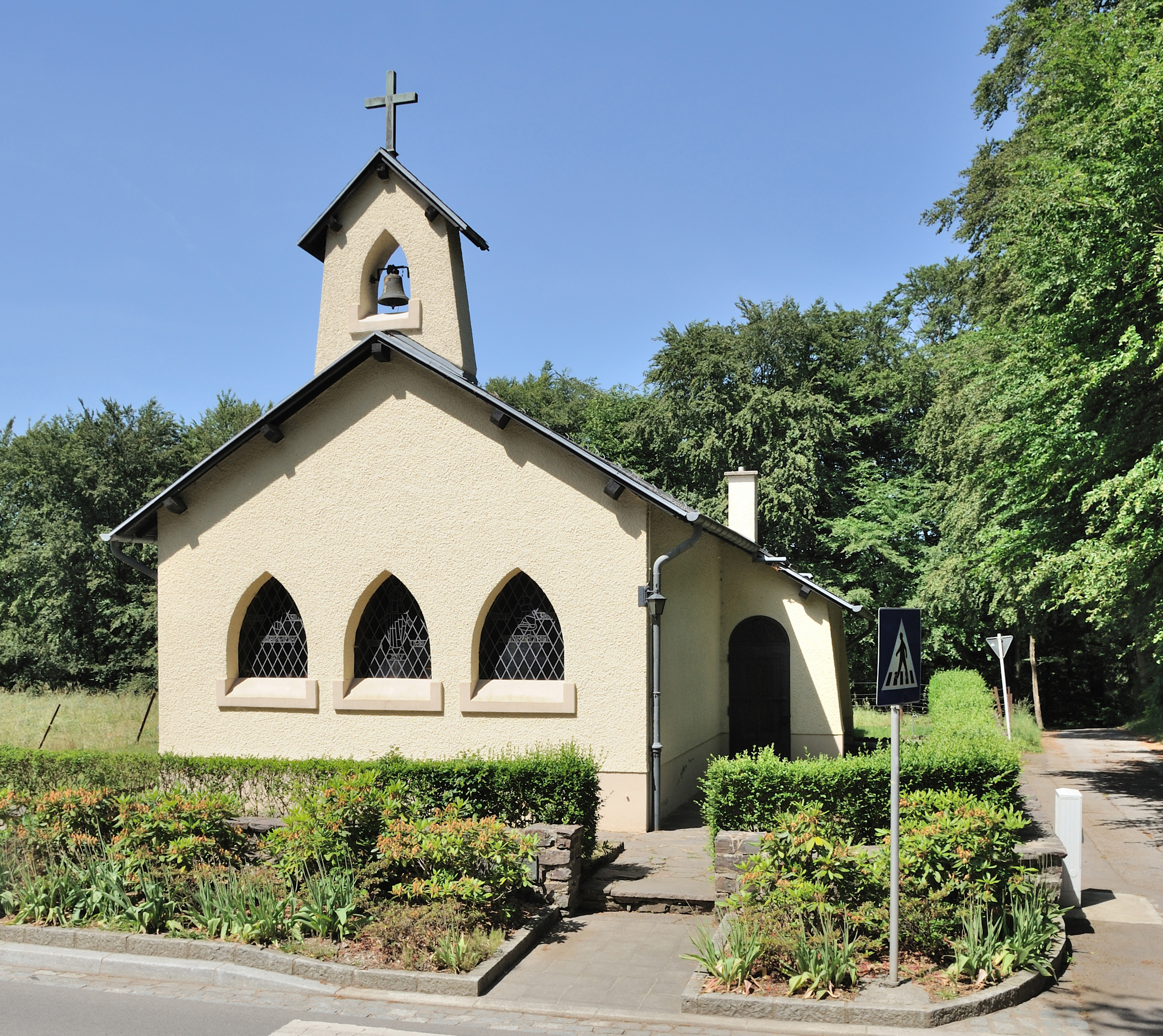

Neuhäusgen or Neuhaeusgen (Luxembourgish: Neihaischen) is a village in the commune of Schuttrange, in southern Luxembourg. As of September 2026, the village had a population of 263.
