= Siege of Naarden (1673) =

1673 battle at Naarden, Dutch Republic

- Part of the Franco-Dutch War
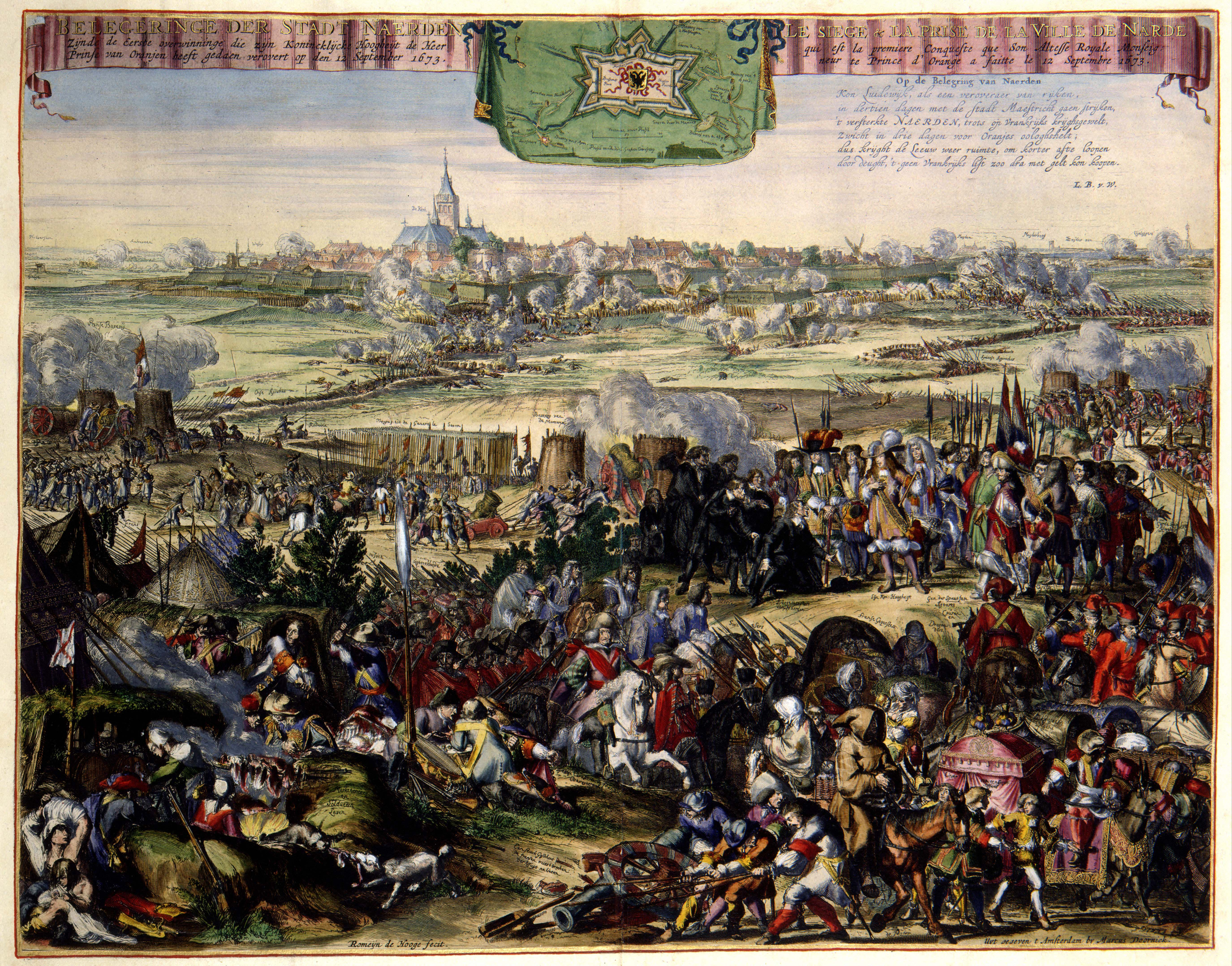
- Siege of Naarden
Date	6–13 September 1673
Location	Naarden, Dutch Republic
Result	Dutch-Spanish victory

Belligerents
Kingdom of France	Dutch Republic; Spain

Commanders and leaders
(Kingdom of France) Phillipe de Pracé du Pas	(Dutch Republic) William III of Orange (Dutch Republic) Godard van Reede-Ginkel

Strength
3,000 men	25,000 men

Casualties and losses
c. 300	c. 300

The siege of Naarden took place from 6 to 13 September 1673 during the Franco-Dutch War of 1672 to 1678, when a Dutch army captured the Dutch fortress town of Naarden. Naarden had been occupied by the French since the previous year.

== Prelude ==
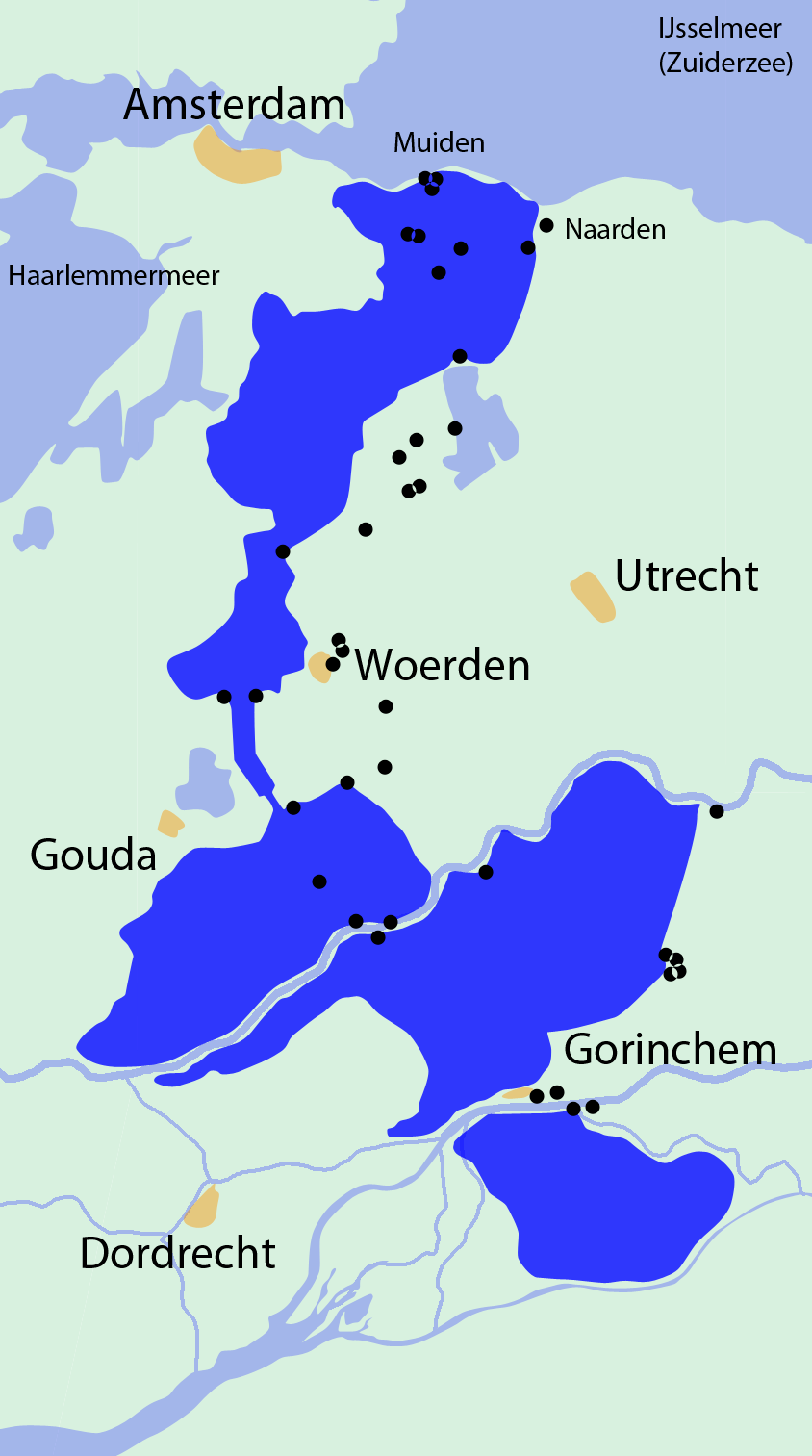
The Dutch army was stationed behind the Dutch Water Line until their counter-attack.

In May 1672, following the outbreak of the Franco-Dutch War and its peripheral conflict the Third Anglo-Dutch War, France, supported by Münster and Cologne, invaded and nearly overran the Dutch Republic. At the same time, it faced the threat of an Anglo-French naval blockade, though that attempt was abandoned following the Battle of Solebay. Naarden, which is positioned close to Amsterdam, was captured by the French on 20 June 1672 and further French advances into the province of Holland were only halted due to the Dutch Water Line. A stalemate followed.

By August 1673 the French had diverted manpower and recources away from the Dutch Republic to be able to conquer the Alsace and the Electorate of Trier. The French did this to safeguard their eastern border. This French aggression was decisive in rallying the German states to support the Dutch and on 28 August, the Dutch Republic and Holy Roman Empire signed the Treaty of The Hague, soon joined by Spain and the Lorraine.

The siege of Trier also proved more difficult than calculated by Vauban and so most of the French cavalry in the Dutch Republic had to be moved to Trier. Luxembourg, the French general in command of the forces in the Netherlands, thus had to take on a defensive posture, something which irritated him greatly. The Dutch, led by William III of Orange, were emboldened by these developments and started planning a counter-attack to liberate the occupied lands of the Dutch Republic. Naarden was chosen as a target. William of Orange ordered Godard van Reede-Ginkel to mount a fake assault with 1,500 cavalrymen on Grave as a diversion. The rest of the army crossed the Water Line in the north and started to besiege Naarden on 6 September. The diversion had succeeded in tricking Luxembourg, as he had moved large amounts of troops to Tiel in the direction of Grave.

== The siege ==
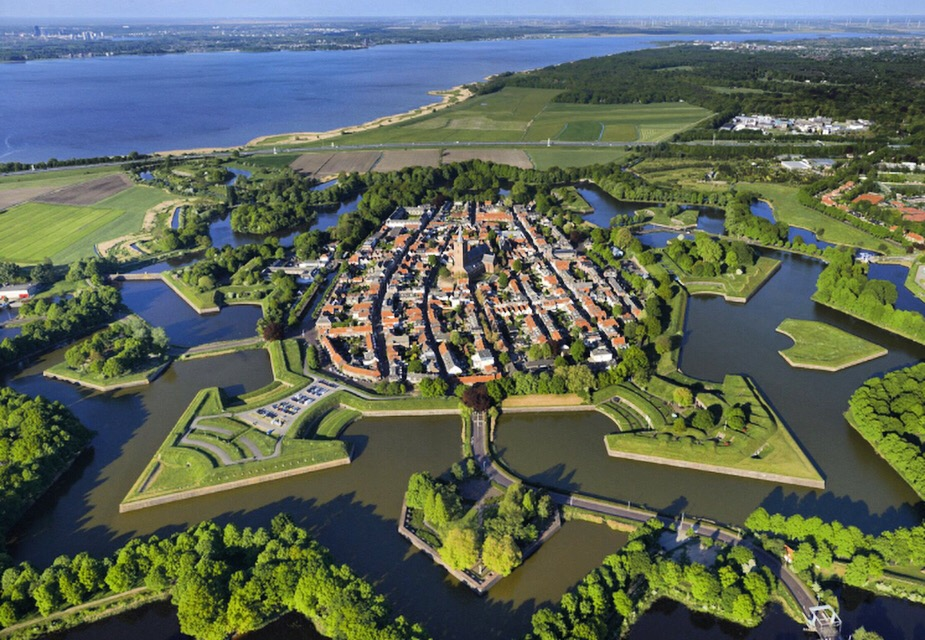
Naarden

The Dutch army, 25,000 strong, had gathered around Naarden on the 6th of September. Its fortifications were not very modern, but met the requirements of the time. In front of the gates, the most vulnerable areas of the fortress, lay ravelins with cannons behind an elevation. Because of a moat around Naarden the ravelins functioned as small triangular fortress islands. Those ravelins had to be captured before the attacker could make work of the main rampart. Philippe de Pracé du Pas, the commander of Naarden, was struggling with a lack of gunpowder and bullets. This allowed the Dutch sappers to dig trenches without much difficulty. A French armed force of 600 men, send out on the first day with the aim of cutting wood for the necessary palisades on the earthen rampart, was also dispersed in disorder by the swift action of Dutch troops under Godard van Reede-Ginkel and a few French soldiers were captured. Some of those captured soldiers told the Dutch about the critical situation inside Naarden and also mentioned that Du Pas was expecting a relieve force under Luxembourg to arrive soon.

Luxembourg had meanwhile been made aware of the attack, and travelled back north to Utrecht where he arrived on the 11th. But instead of moving straight to relieve Naarden he decided to wait for reinforcements. William of Orange, unaware of this had planned to take Naarden as fast as he could. Instead of the slow method of siege engineering, an assault now had to be organised with great haste. The Dutch artillery had by now shot a few solid breaches in the main wall and the French's weak cannon fire had been completely silenced. For the Dutch assault to succeed, the ravelin in front of the main wall had to be captured first. This was to be done by a Spanish infantry regiment and a regiment of Dutch marines led by Colonel Palm. As the moat was too deep to wade through, mats made of twigs had to be knotted first to dampen the moat. The path that could be laid with these was soggy, but usable for an assault.

On 11 September at 11 o'clock in the evening, the trumpeters blew the signal and drum rolls rose from the Dutch and Spanish army camps. Immediately afterwards, the sound of the alarm bell resounded from Naarden. Covered in darkness, the attackers ran across the thickets of branches. Some 600 French soldiers lay ready in the breach. Colonel Palm and his soldiers plunged in on the soldiers in the breach, and were welcomed with a murderous salvo from the French muskets. After a fierce struggle the Dutch and Spanish succeeded in capturing the raveline. That same night, Dutch artillery was placed on the captured raveline to bring the guns as close to the city walls as possible. The next morning, no Frenchman dared to show up on the ramparts. That same morning, the Dutch began to organise a final attack. When Du Pas noticed this, he made it known he wanted to talk. The first proposal for a truce was refused by William. Not long after, the city was surrendered and the next morning the Dutch and their Spanish allies entered the fortified city. The 2,700 survivors were allowed to march out with the honours of war.

== Aftermath ==
On the Dutch side, the recapture of Naarden was a huge boost; on the French side, the fall gave the Marquis de Louvois a rough couple of weeks. The Dutch War was not going well. Luxembourg clearly let him know this too. He simply did not have enough soldiers left to resist the Dutch. Luxembourg wrote 'This forces me to ask, "My God, why have you forsaken me?"' Did you not know how strong the Dutch were and that they would try something'. If Holland was to be preserved he simply needed more soldiers he reiterated.

Naarden had shown that the French position in the Netherlands was untenable. The front line had become too long, leaving the Dutch front too sparsely manned. With the Imperial army approaching, the situation could become very dangerous. The French had to make a choice and perhaps withdraw from the Dutch Republic. However, this would be difficult for Louis XIV to stomach. Louvois wrote to Luxembourg that 'in his present mood His Majesty would rather give up Paris than Maastricht.' Supported by Turenne however, Louvios was able to convince Louis XIV of an evacuation of the Dutch Republic. The allied capture of Bonn, an important magazine in the long logistical lines between France and the northern war zone again showed the evacuation to be necessary. Louis was deeply shocked and retreated to St Germain where no one, except a few intimates, were allowed to disturb him. The next year only Grave and Maastricht remained in French hands.

Du Pas had been stripped of his rank and expelled from the nobility as a result of the disgrace. He would not survive the disgrace he had brought on himself and his family. The following year, he sought and found death during the Siege of Grave.

== See also ==
- Franco-Dutch War
- Dutch Water Line
- Siege of Bonn (1673)
- Siege of Grave (1674)
- Third Anglo-Dutch War

== Sources ==
- Panhuysen, Luc (2009). Rampjaar 1672: Hoe de Republiek aan de ondergang ontsnapte. Uitgeverij Atlas. ISBN 9789045013282.
- Nimwegen, Olaf van (2020). De Veertigjarige Oorlog 1672-1712: de strijd van de Nederlanders tegen de Zonnekoning (in Dutch). Prometheus. ISBN 978-9044638714.
