= Mariana Alcoforado =

Portuguese nun (born 1640)

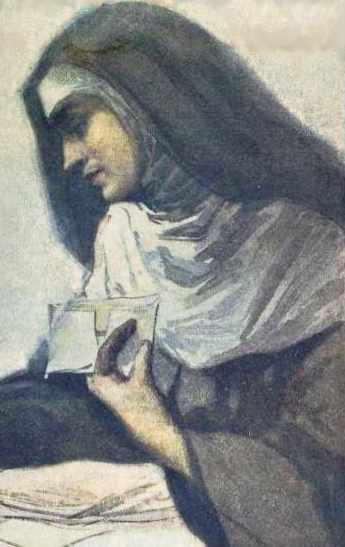
- Sóror Mariana Alcoforado
- Born: 22 April 1640; Beja, Portugal
- Died: 28 July 1723 (aged 83)
- Occupations: Nun, Writer
- Writing career
- Language: Portuguese
- Notable work: Letters of a Portuguese Nun

Sóror Mariana Alcoforado (Santa Maria da Feira, Beja, 22 April 1640 – Beja, 28 July 1723) was a Portuguese nun living in the convent of the Poor Clares (Convento de Nossa Senhora da Conceição, Convent of Our Lady of the Conception) in Beja, Portugal.

Debate continues as to whether Mariana was the real Portuguese author of the Letters of a Portuguese Nun (comprising five letters). Her purported love affair with the French officer Noël Bouton, Marquis de Chamilly and later Marshal of France, has made Beja famous in literary circles, mainly in Portugal and France.

Some literary scholars consider the letters a fictional work and ascribe their authorship to Gabriel-Joseph de Lavergne, comte de Guilleragues (1628–1684), although a real nun named Mariana Alcoforado indeed existed. In her recent book Letters of a Portuguese Nun: Uncovering the Mystery Behind a Seventeenth-Century Forbidden Love (2006), the author Myriam Cyr has attempted to reassert the attribution of the letters to the real Mariana Alcoforado.

== Biography ==
Note: the following biography is based in large part on the letters and may contain, for that reason, fictionalized elements.

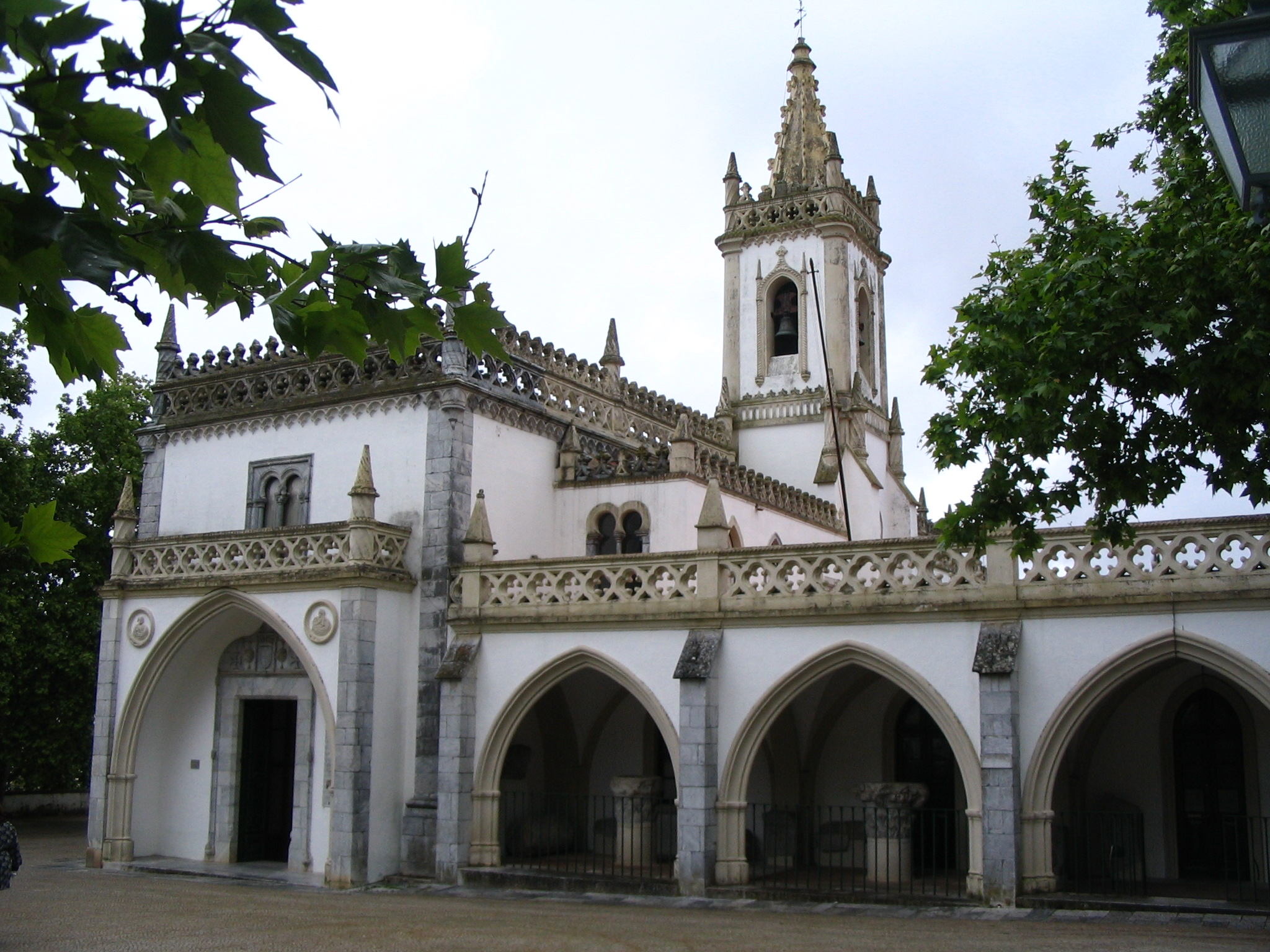
The convent where Soror Mariana Alcoforado lived (now a regional museum); in Beja, Portugal.

Mariana Alcoforado was born in Beja, daughter of landed proprietor of Alentejo Francisco da Cunha Alcoforado, born at Cortiços, Macedo de Cavaleiros, and first wife Leonor Mendes. She had three brothers: Baltasar Vaz Alcoforado, Miguel da Cunha Alcoforado and Francisco da Cunha Alcoforado, and two sisters: Anna Maria da Cunha Alcoforado, wife of Rui de Mello Lobo Freire, and Maria Peregrina Alcoforado. Beja was the chief garrison town of the province and the principal theatre of the twenty-eight years' war with Spain that followed the Portuguese Revolution of 1640. Mariana's widowed father, occupied with administrative and military commissions, placed her in the wealthy convent of the Conception for security and education. He later remarried and had two more daughters, Maria da Conceição Alcoforado and Catarina Alcoforado, and was also made a Knight of the Order of Christ on 15 December 1647.

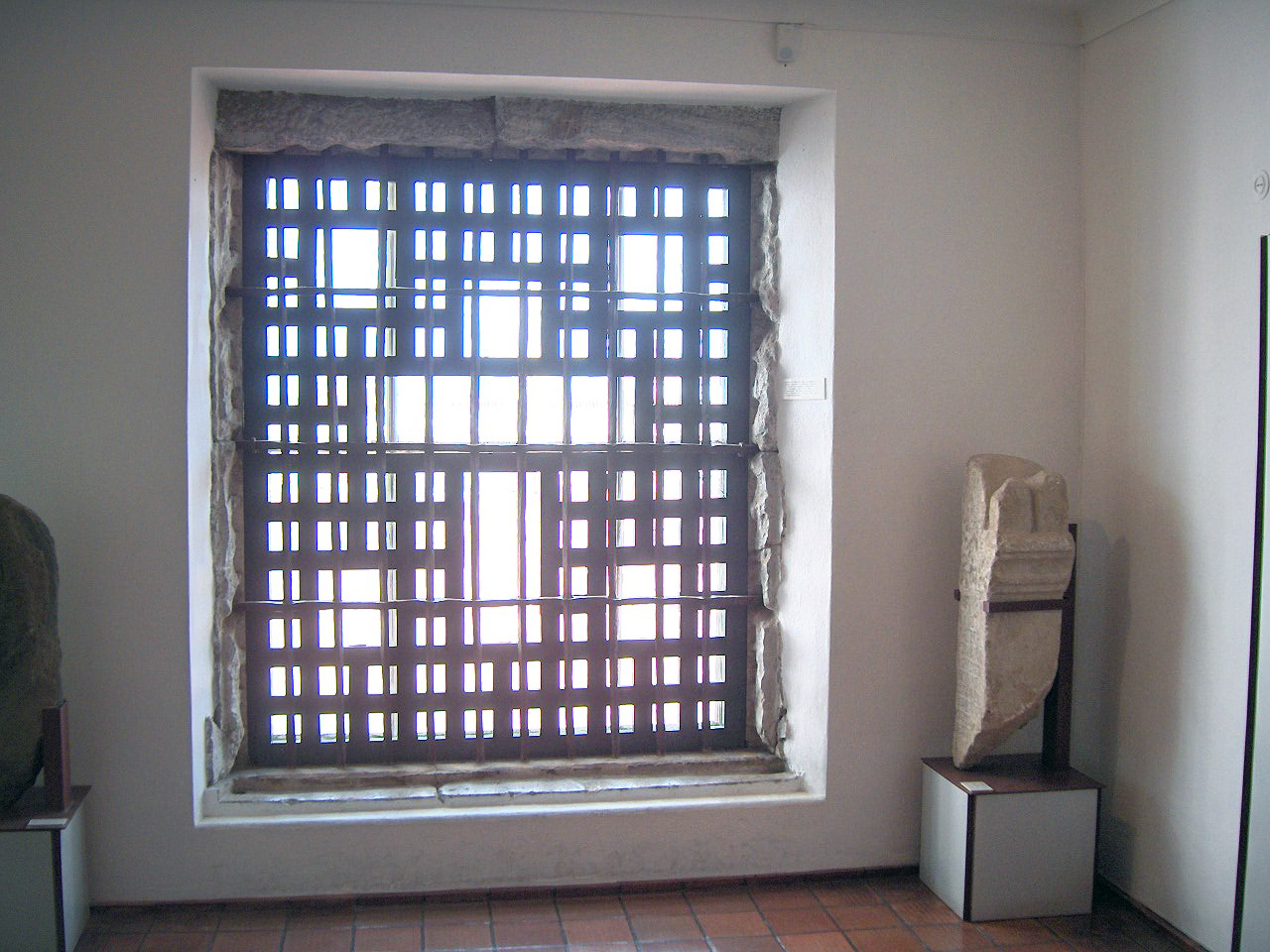
(Replica of the) window from where the nun spoke with the French officer.

She made her religious profession as a Franciscan nun of the Poor Ladies at sixteen or earlier, without any real vocation, and lived a routine life in that somewhat relaxed house until her twenty-fifth year, when she purportedly met the young French nobleman Noël Bouton. This man, afterwards known as marquis of Chamilly, and marshal of France, was one of the French officers who came to Portugal to serve under the captain, Frederick Schomberg, 1st Duke of Schomberg, the re-organizer of the Portuguese army, campaigning against the Spanish army in the Alentejo.

During the years 1665-1667, the marquis of Chamilly spent much of his time in and about Beja, and probably became acquainted with the Alcoforado family through Sóror Mariana's brother, who was a soldier. Custom permitted those in religious orders to receive and entertain visitors, and Chamilly found it easy to get round the trustful nun. Before long their affair became known and caused a scandal, and to avoid the consequences Chamilly deserted Soror Mariana and returned to France. This resulted in Soror Mariana writing the letters.

There are signs in the fifth letter that Soror Mariana had begun to conquer her passion. After a life of rigid penance, accompanied by much suffering, she died, aged 83. Soror Mariana's life story has also been described in the novel by Katherine Vaz, Mariana, published by Aliform Publishing in 2005.
