= Übersyren =

Town in Schuttrange, Luxembourg

Coordinates: 49.632°N 6.276°E

Übersyren or Uebersyren (Luxembourgish: Iwwersiren [ivɐˈziːʀən]) is a small town in the commune of Schuttrange, in southern Luxembourg. As of September 2026, the town has a population of 768.
