= Siege of Grave (1674) =

Part of the Franco-Dutch War of 1672 to 1678

- Part of the Franco-Dutch War
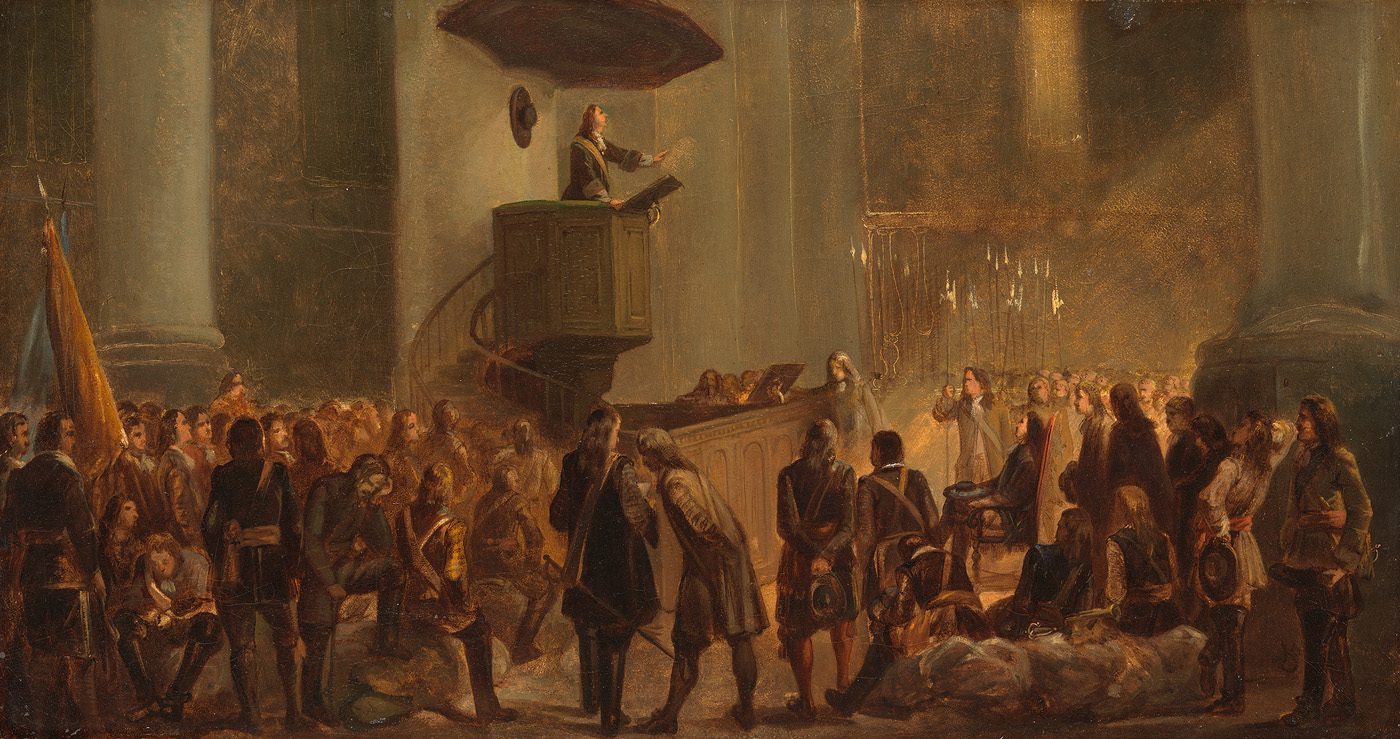
- The thanksgiving service of William III's army in Grave after its capture
Date	25 July – 27 October 1674
Location	Grave, Dutch Republic 51°45′35″N 5°44′27″E
Result	Dutch victory

Belligerents
Kingdom of France	Dutch Republic; Spain; Brandenburg-Prussia

Commanders and leaders
(Kingdom of France) Noël Bouton de Chamilly	(Dutch Republic) William III of Orange; (Dutch Republic) Carl von Rabenhaupt; (Dutch Republic) Henry Casimir II; (Dutch Republic) Menno van Coehoorn

Strength
4,000 men 450 guns, of which 100 were in use	30,000 men (10,000 reinforcements arrived on 9 October)

Casualties and losses
2,000	7,000–8,000

The siege of Grave took place from 25 July to 27 October in 1674 during the Franco–Dutch War of 1672 to 1678, when a Dutch army captured the Dutch fortress town of Grave (De Graaf) in what is now North Brabant. Grave had been occupied by the French since the summer of 1672 when an army under Turenne forced the town to surrender.

== Prelude ==
In May 1672, following the outbreak of the Franco-Dutch War and its peripheral conflict the Third Anglo-Dutch War, France, supported by Münster and Cologne, invaded and nearly overran the Dutch Republic. At the same time, the Dutch faced the threat of an Anglo-French naval blockade, though that attempt was abandoned following the Battle of Solebay. Grave, a strong fortress town, strategically placed along the Meuse river was captured by the French on 5 July 1672 without much difficulty. French advances into Holland, the most important province of the Dutch Republic were however halted due to the Dutch Water Line. A stalemate ensued.

After the Treaty of the Hague in 1673, the Holy Roman Empire, Spain and the Lorraine joined the war in support of the Dutch. More and more French troops in the Netherlands were moved to other fronts. This allowed the Dutch to counter-attack; in September they captured Naarden and in November Bonn was captured by an allied force. These setbacks forced Louis XIV, the French king, to evacuate his forces from most of the Dutch Republic. By 1674, the French remained only in two Dutch places: Maastricht and Grave. Having lost the support of the French army, the French allies Münster and Cologne subsequently made peace on 22 April (Münster) and 11 May (Cologne).

== Siege ==
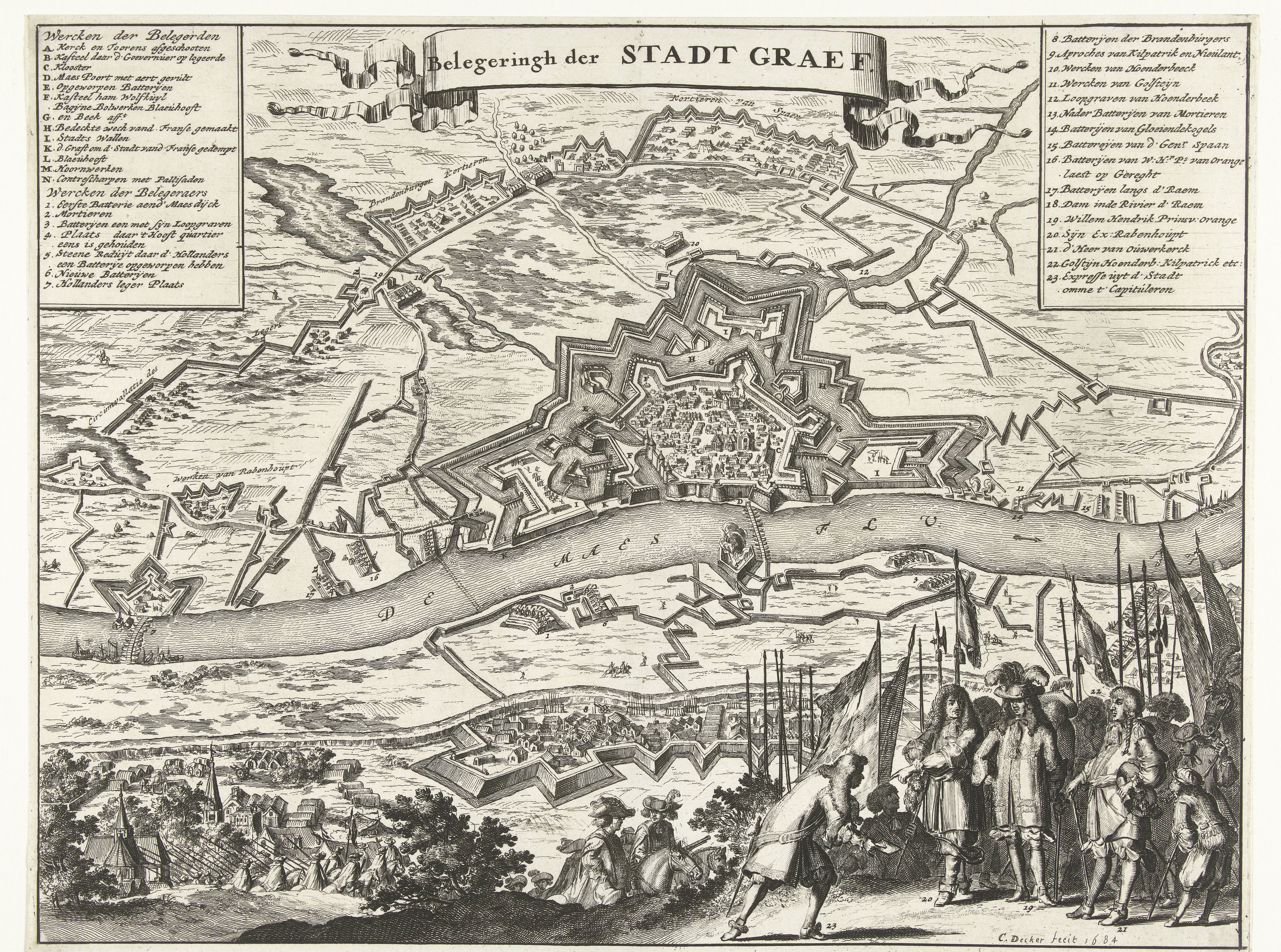
The siege of Grave

Cut off from other French possessions, the defenders of Grave under the command of Noël Bouton de Chamilly transformed the town into a hedgehog fortress. Lieutenant-general Carl von Rabenhaupt was sent with a Dutch army supported by some Spanish and Brandenburgian forces to capture the town. However, problems with the payment of the soldiers and logistics meant it took a long time for the siege to begin. The army finally started the siege on 25 July. Chamilly had taken advantage of this time to further strengthen the fortress.

The strong French defences meant that the siege went on with great difficulty for the attackers. Effective French artillery fire made it difficult for the Dutch to dig trenches close to the walls and the Meuse river formed an extra obstacle. On 11 August Rabenhaupt's circumvallation line was completed so that the attackers could better defend themselves from a possible relief army. The Dutch also diverted the river Raam so that it supplied the Dutch moats with water, while depriving the moats of Grave of water. A successful sortie from the defenders however delayed the advance again. After more slow progress, Menno van Coehoorn, the renowned fortress construction expert, came to advise Rabenhaupt, but the old general (71 years old) ignored that advice.

The Dutch Republic, Spain and the Emperor had been broadly in agreement concerning the strategic plans for 1674. They involved the deployment of over 120,000 soldiers spread across three different war zones: The Spanish Netherlands, the Rhineland and the Franco–Spanish border. The largest joint effort would be made in the Spanish Netherlands, where over 70,000 soldiers had been made available, commanded by William of Orange and de Souches. Confident that they would vastly outnumber the French in every front, the allies went on the attack. However, the French army in the Spanish Netherlands under Condé was 20,000 stronger than expected and comprised 50,000 men. This fact combined with poor cooperation between the allied army leaders meant that the campaign ended in a deception for them. At Seneffe, the allies and the French fought a very bloody, but ultimately inconclusive battle. William and the Dutch blamed de Souches and after a failed attempt to capture Oudenaarde, largely due to obstructionism from de Souches, he was relieved of command. Frustrated, William joined the army under Rabenhaupt with 10,000 troops instead of campaigning further in the Spanish Netherlands.

De Chamilly felt flattered that the renowned William of Orange had come to challenge him, and so he intended to prove himself worthy of that opponent. William, assisted by his cousin Henry Casimir II, brought with him all his cavalry and a quantity of foot soldiers, bringing the amount of reinforcements to about 10,000. He himself established his headquarters in Wychen Castle, and took charge of siege. He did this with as little success as Rabenhaupt had achieved however, for the fortress stubbornly continued to hold out and it more and more seemed as if weapons could not force the siege to a conclusion.

Louis XIV's original intention, to bring down the Dutch Republic by invading it, had already failed. Maintaining an isolated position like Grave therefore hardly made sense, and it was therefore not surprising that the French king himself advised his, still far from exhausted, commander to abandon the siege. After a brief truce, during which negotiations were conducted, de Chamilly capitulated on 27 October on very favourable terms and in all-round honourable manner. William of Orange had learned to appreciate his adversary, who had proven to be an excellent match for the besiegers, and his respect and sympathy made him decide to allow the defenders to leave the fortress with the honours of war.

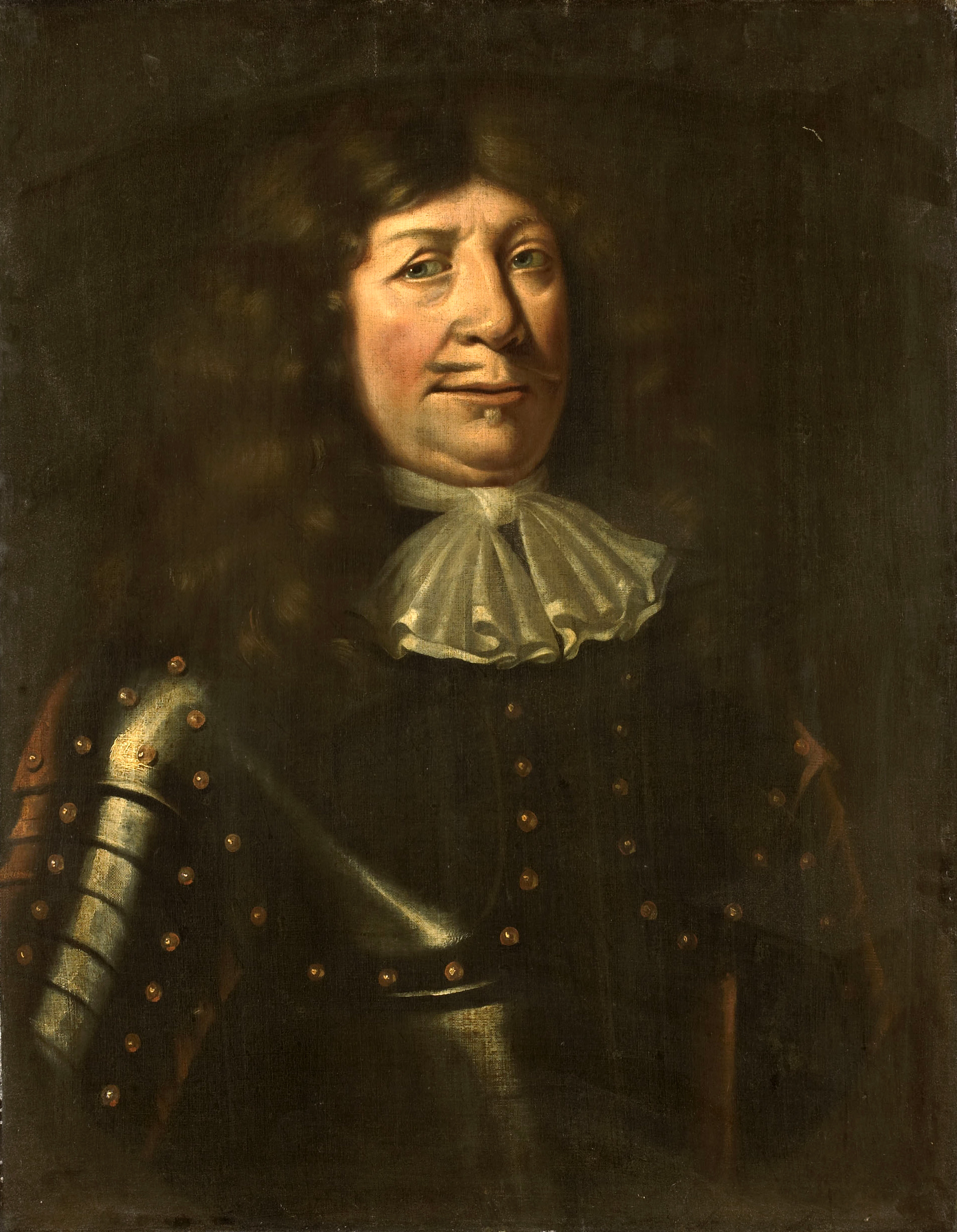
Carl von Rabenhaupt commanded the siege before William of Orange took over.

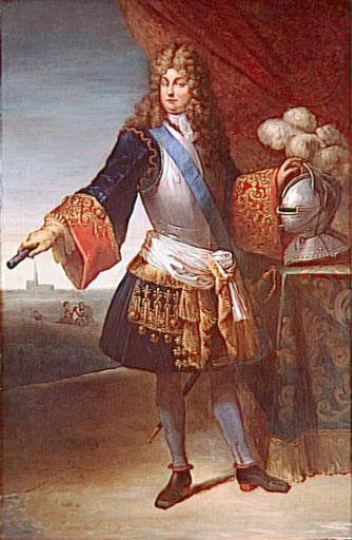
Noël Bouton de Chamilly received much praise for his leadership during the siege.

== Aftermath ==
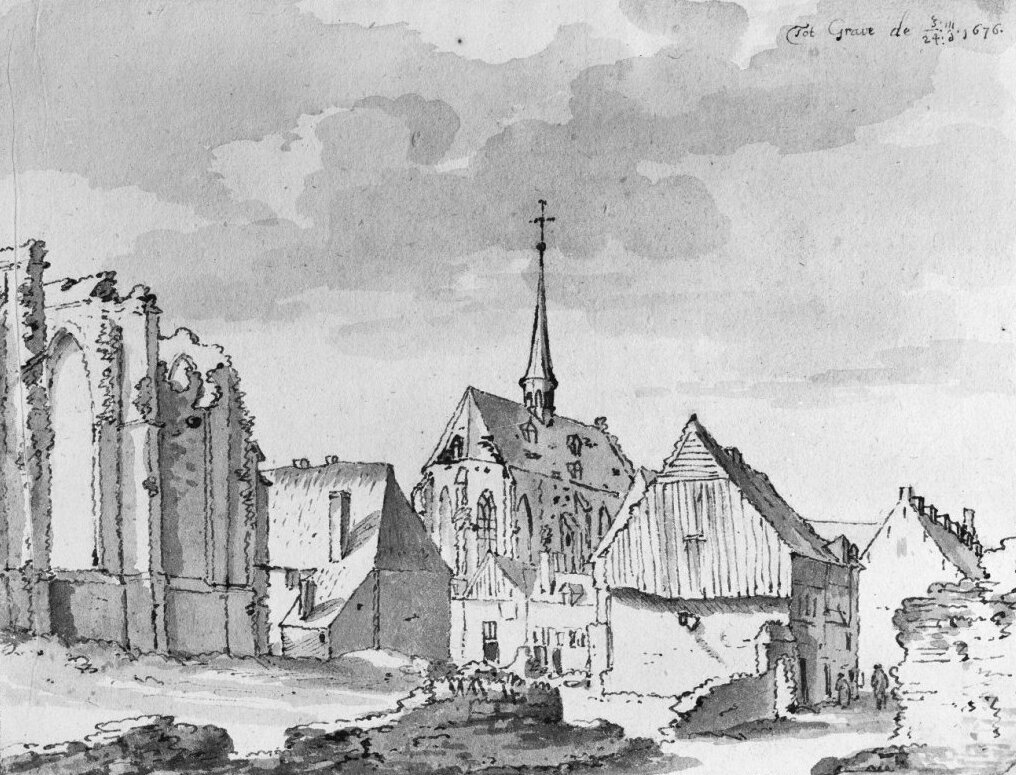
Illustration from Grave in 1676

The exodus of the garrison took place on the following day. On the same day, William of Orange and a large retinue of the Dutch States Army went to church in the heavily damaged St Elizabeth's church in Grave, where he attended the sermon in his military outfit and listened to the sermon of thanksgiving from his also "booted and spurred" court preacher 'De Roy'.

Grave was effectively destroyed. The number of civilian casualties is not known, but the suffering was indescribable. The more than 100,000 cannonballs and the 3,000 bombs that had struck the town and its defences had caused death and destruction in the fortress, which was only a few dozen hectares in size. The capture of this strong yet small town was a meagre result compared to the plans the allies had had at the beginning of the year. Still, the result was significant because it meant that all the adjacent lands of the Dutch Republic were now in back in Dutch hands and it left Maastricht as the only yet to be liberated Dutch territory.

The siege and the Battle of Seneffe were illustrative of the stage the war had reached. Two years after the French lightning attack, the war had turned into a war of attrition. As armies expanded and the battlefield was relocated, casualties had increased. The allies and France were of similar strength, but the parties were not yet tired enough of the war to agree to a peace.

== Sources ==
- Laguette, J. A. (1974). "Beleg en herovering van Grave in 1674" (PDF). Militaire Spectator (in Dutch): 547–556.
- Panhuysen, Luc (2009). Rampjaar 1672: Hoe de Republiek aan de ondergang ontsnapte (in Dutch). Uitgeverij Atlas. ISBN 9789045013282.
- van Nimwegen, Olaf (2020). De Veertigjarige Oorlog 1672–1712: de strijd van de Nederlanders tegen de Zonnekoning (in Dutch). Prometheus. ISBN 978-9044638714.
- van Nimwegen, Olaf (2010). The Dutch Army and the Military Revolutions, 1588–1688. Boydell Press. ISBN 978-1843835752.
