= Frantz Funck-Brentano =

French historian and librarian (1862–1947)

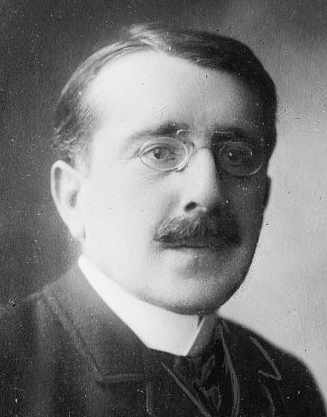
- Born: 15 June 1862 castle of Munsbach, Luxembourg
- Died: 13 June 1947 (aged 84)

Academic background
- Education: École Nationale des Chartes

Academic work
- Notable works: L'Ancien régime (book)

Frantz Funck-Brentano (15 June 1862 – 13 June 1947) was a French historian and librarian. He was born in the castle of Munsbach (Luxembourg) and died at Montfermeil. He was a son of Théophile Funck-Brentano.

== Biography ==
After graduating at a young age from the prestigious École Nationale des Chartes, Frantz Funck-Brentano was in 1882 named curator of the Bibliothèque de l'Arsenal, of which he never became director. His research focused especially on the Ancien Régime, primarily because this library housed the archive of documents from the Bastille, which represented an incomparable source for the history, in particular the political history of the Ancien Régime. Funck-Bentano himself compiled the voluminous and exhaustive catalogue of this archive while he was curator. The depths of this resource led him to study all aspects of the history of the Ancien Régime: its institutions, peculiarities, personalities and famous events, which he made the subject of highly referenced books that brought great success to the library.

In 1900, he became a replacement professor at the Collège de France, in the chair of comparative legislative history, where he dealt with the foundation of Western European cities.

In 1905, he was appointed a principal lecturer of the Alliance française to the United States. At the same time, he was mandated by the French government to study the spread of French literature in the United States, Canada and Cuba. In this capacity, he spoke before President Theodore Roosevelt in the White House. On his return to France, he was made a knight of the Légion d'honneur.

In 1909, he spoke before French circles of Austria-Hungary, in Vienna, Prague and Budapest, on the history of France through the ages.

After this, he served several times as lecturer for the Alliance française, in the Netherlands, England, Denmark, Sweden and Norway, Romania and Russia. In 1906, the Académie des Inscriptions et Belles-Lettres awarded him the important Prix Berger for his works on the history of Paris. He was elected member of the Académie des sciences morales et politiques in 1928, and president of the Société des études historiques.

Alongside his academic work, Funck-Brentano pursued a literary career, writing plays and popular historical works, and in journalism: he contributed notably to Minerva, a nationalist and monarchist historical and critical review, to Revue d'Action française and Charles Maurras's Action Française. His involvement with extreme right-wing politics also influenced his work; a major part of his Marat ou le mensonge des mots (1941) consists of a virulent attack on Marat, whom he describes as a "semite", riddled with classic antisemitic themes of the day.

One of his sons, Christian Funck-Bentano (1894–1966) was among the founders of the newspaper Le Monde; another, Claude Théophile (born 1892) was shot down on the front at Vosges in February 1916. He is commemorated at Pair-et-Grandrupt.

== Literary works ==
- 1896: Philippe le Bel en Flandre (doctoral thesis)
- 1900: Le drame des poisons
- 1903: Grandeur et Décadence des Aristocraties
- 1912: Rosette, ou l'Amoureuse conspiration (novel, with André de Lorde)
- 1922: The National History of France: The Middle Ages (English translation: Elizabeth O'Neill, M.A.)
- 1926: L'Ancien régime
- 1926: Les lettres de cachet
- 1932: Les secrets de la Bastille

== Sources ==
- Bonnier, Charles; Candar, Gilles (2001). Les Souvenirs de Charles Bonnier: Un intellectuel socialiste européen à la belle époque (in French). Presses Univ. Septentrion. ISBN 978-2-85939-634-3.
- Fulcher, Jane F. (1 November 2013). The Oxford Handbook of the New Cultural History of Music. Oxford University Press. ISBN 978-0-19-971198-7.
- Mersch, Jules (1962). Biographie nationale du pays de Luxembourg depuis ses originees jusqu'a nos jours (in French). Imprimerie de la Cour Victor Buck.
- Public Opinion. Public Opinion Company. 1904.
- Rivain, Jean (1 January 1931). Une page d'histoire morale, suivie de quelques lettres et de documents historiques: Le cas de M. de Courville, 17 décembre 1928 - 17 juillet 1929 (in French). FeniXX.
- Schmidt, Jan (17 July 2018). The Orientalist Karl Süssheim Meets the Young Turk Officer İsma'il Hakkı Bey: Two Unexplored Sources from the Last Decade in the Reign of the Ottoman Sultan Abdulhamid II. BRILL. ISBN 978-90-04-36617-6.
