= Munsbach =

Town in the commune of Schuttrange in Luxembourg

Coordinates: 49°38′N 6°16′E

Munsbach (Luxembourgish: Mënsbech, locally Minsbech, pronounced [ˈmənsbəɕ, ˈmins-]; German: Münsbach [ˈmʏnsbax]) is a small town in the commune of Schuttrange, in eastern Luxembourg. As of September 2026, the town has a population of 756. The Baroque style Munsbach Castle from 1775 is home to the Institut Universitaire International Luxembourg which provides educational courses in business, European law and public sector management.

== Housing Projects ==
In 2023, the "Jugend Wunnengen" housing project in Munsbach was inaugurated by Housing Minister Henri Kox, alongside representatives from Schuttrange municipality and "Wunnengshëllef asbl." This project is part of Schuttrange's ongoing efforts to provide subsidized housing. The initiative involved transforming the "Ernens" house at 30, um Schënnbierg into seven individual units for young adults aged 18 to 27. Managed by Wunnengshëllef, the project aims to support young people who have left their family homes for various reasons, enabling them to continue their education and transition to independent living.

The accommodations are individual rooms within community houses where residents share common areas such as kitchens, living rooms, and bathrooms. Each resident is responsible for their own cleaning, laundry, shopping, and cooking, while everyone participates in maintaining the communal spaces. Weekly meetings with socio-educational staff provide additional support.

Eligibility requirements include being at least 18 years old, being in a situation that hinders continued education at home, and agreeing to psycho-social and school support services from SePAS and Wunnengshëllef. The project is 75% funded by the Ministry of Housing, with the Ministry of National Education, Children and Youth financing the socio-educational support.
