= Schrassig =

Town in the commune of Schuttrange in Luxembourg

Coordinates: 49°36′N 6°16′E

Schrassig (German pronunciation: [ˈʃʁasɪç]; Luxembourgish: Schraasseg [ˈʃʀaːsəɕ]) is a town in the commune of Schuttrange, in the south-east of Luxembourg. As of September 2026, the town has a population of 871. It houses the country's biggest prison.
