= Théophile Funck-Brentano =

Théophile Funck-Brentano (21 August 1830 – 23 January 1906) was a Luxembourgish-French sociologist.

He was the son of Jacques Funck, a notary in Luxembourg City that lived with Charles Metz, who was witness to Funck-Bretano's birth. He was the father of Frantz Funck-Brentano.

== Literary works ==
- Les sciences humaines, 1868
- La pensée exacte en philosophie, 1869
- La civilisation et ses lois, 1876
- La politique, 1897
- Les sophistes français, 1905
