= Munsbach Castle =

Coordinates: 49°37′49″N 6°15′34″E

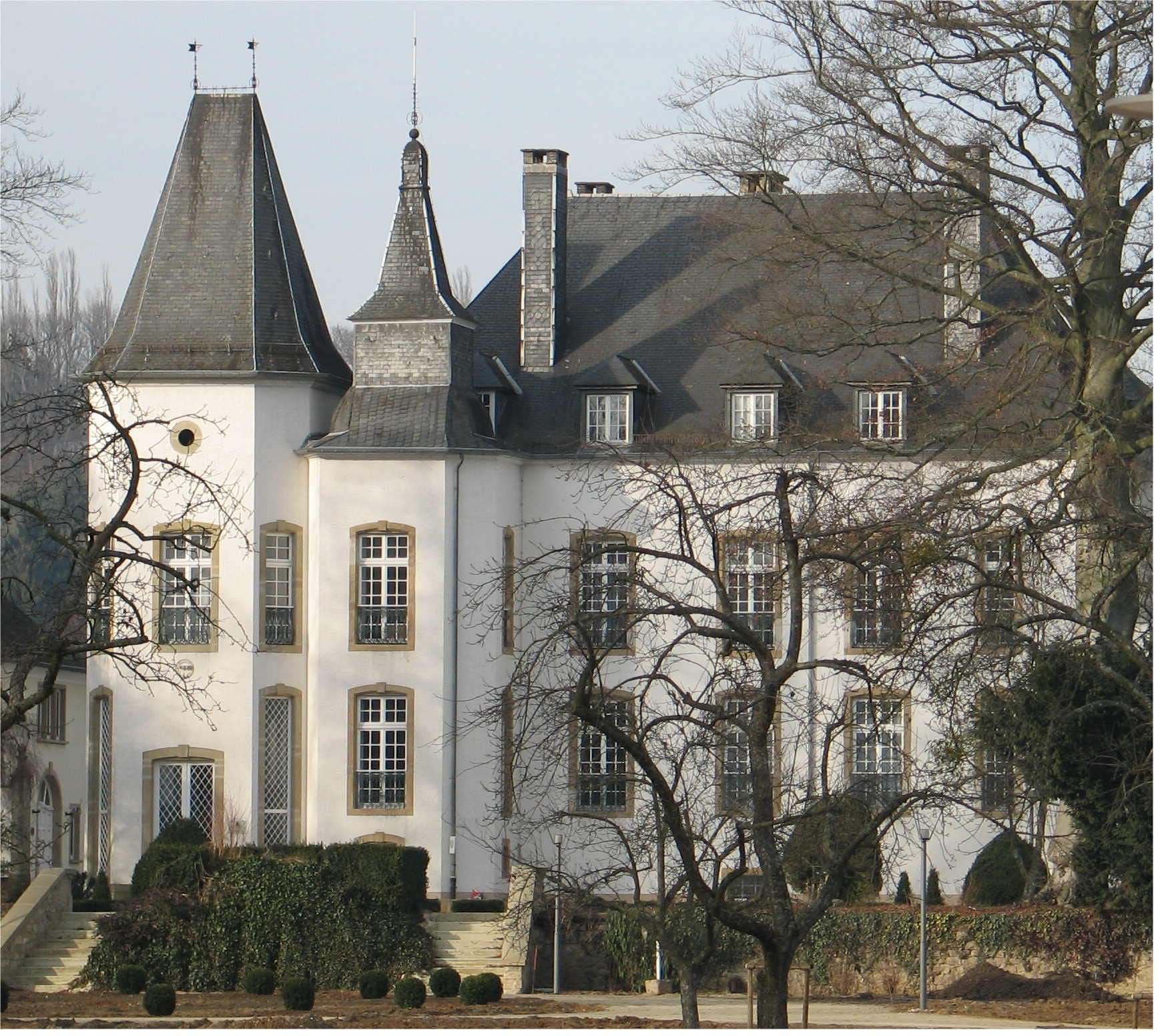
Munsbach Castle

Munsbach Castle (Luxembourgish: Schlass Mënsbech; French: Château de Munsbach; German: Schloss Münsbach) is located to the west of Munsbach, in the Schuttrange commune, east of Luxembourg city. Built in 1775 in the Baroque style, the main building was originally used as a manor for a long time, before it was transformed into a castle at the end of the 19th century, with the addition of two towers and a number of independent buildings.

The castle is situated in the midst of a park with a rose garden that is permanently open to the public free of charge, and which hosts an annual Rose Fest in September. The garden preserves a collection of more than 600 rose varieties with a rich history of Luxembourgish heritage, dating back to the beginning of the 20th century, when Luxembourg was once the largest exporter of roses in the world. The rose garden was created and is regularly maintained and improved by volunteers of the Lëtzebuerger Rousefrënn (Luxembourg Rose friends) association, in collaboration with the Schuttrange commune.

The castle itself cannot be visited, and it now serves as the administrative building of the Centre for Social and Emotional Development (CDSE) which created and designed the first open-air mindfulness trail in the Grand Duchy of Luxembourg, which was inaugurated in 2021 by Claude Meisch as Minister of National Education, Children and Youth. With the help of mindfulness, a practice with origins in Buddhism, the CDSE promotes awareness of emotional skills and well-being. It was originally an initiative in response to the effects of stress and emotional insecurity caused by the COVID-19 pandemic.

== Past administration ==
In 1927, the buildings were sold to the Zender-Angelsberg family who operated a distillery, and manufactured the "Bernardine" Liqueur.

In 1943, the castle was sold to Gauleiter Gustav Simon who turned it into an orphanage, which continued to be run by the Luxembourg state after the Second World War, until 1979.

From 1983 to 2006, its premises were used by l’Institut d’Europe, and from 2002 till 2015 the buildings were administered by the Institut Universitaire International Luxembourg which provides educational courses in business, European law and public sector management.

The castle also hosted the European University Foundation - Campus Europae, a network of universities, which promotes European citizenship and multilingualism through student exchange and academic cooperation.

== See also ==
- List of castles in Luxembourg
