= Gabriel de Guilleragues =

French politician

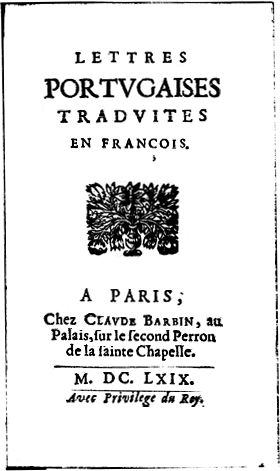
Lettres portugaises.

Gabriel-Joseph de Lavergne, comte de Guilleragues (1628–1684), was a French politician of the 17th century.

For a time, he was secretary of the King's Chamber, and he also director of the Gazette de France.

In 1677, he was named ambassador at the Ottoman Court. In 1679 and 1680, Louis XIV through Guilleragues encouraged the Ottoman Grand Vizier Kara Mustafa to intervene in the Magyar Rebellion against the Habsburg, but without success. Louis XIV communicated to the Turks that he would never fight on the side of the Austrian Emperor Leopold I, and he instead massed troops at the eastern frontier of France. These reassurances encouraged the Turks not to renew the 20-year 1664 Vasvár truce with Austria and to move to the offensive.

Guilleragues died of apoplexy in Constantinople in 1684.

He is thought to have been the author of Letters of a Portuguese Nun.

== Works ==
- Relation véritable de ce qui s'est passé à Constantinople
- Ambassade du Comte de Guilleragues et de M. de Girardin auprès du grand Seigneur

Diplomatic posts
Preceded by Charles Marie François Olier, marquis de Nointel	French Ambassador to the Ottoman Empire; 1677–1684	Succeeded by Pierre de Girardin

== See also ==
- Franco-Ottoman alliance
