= Brichermillen =

Village and former mill in Luxembourg

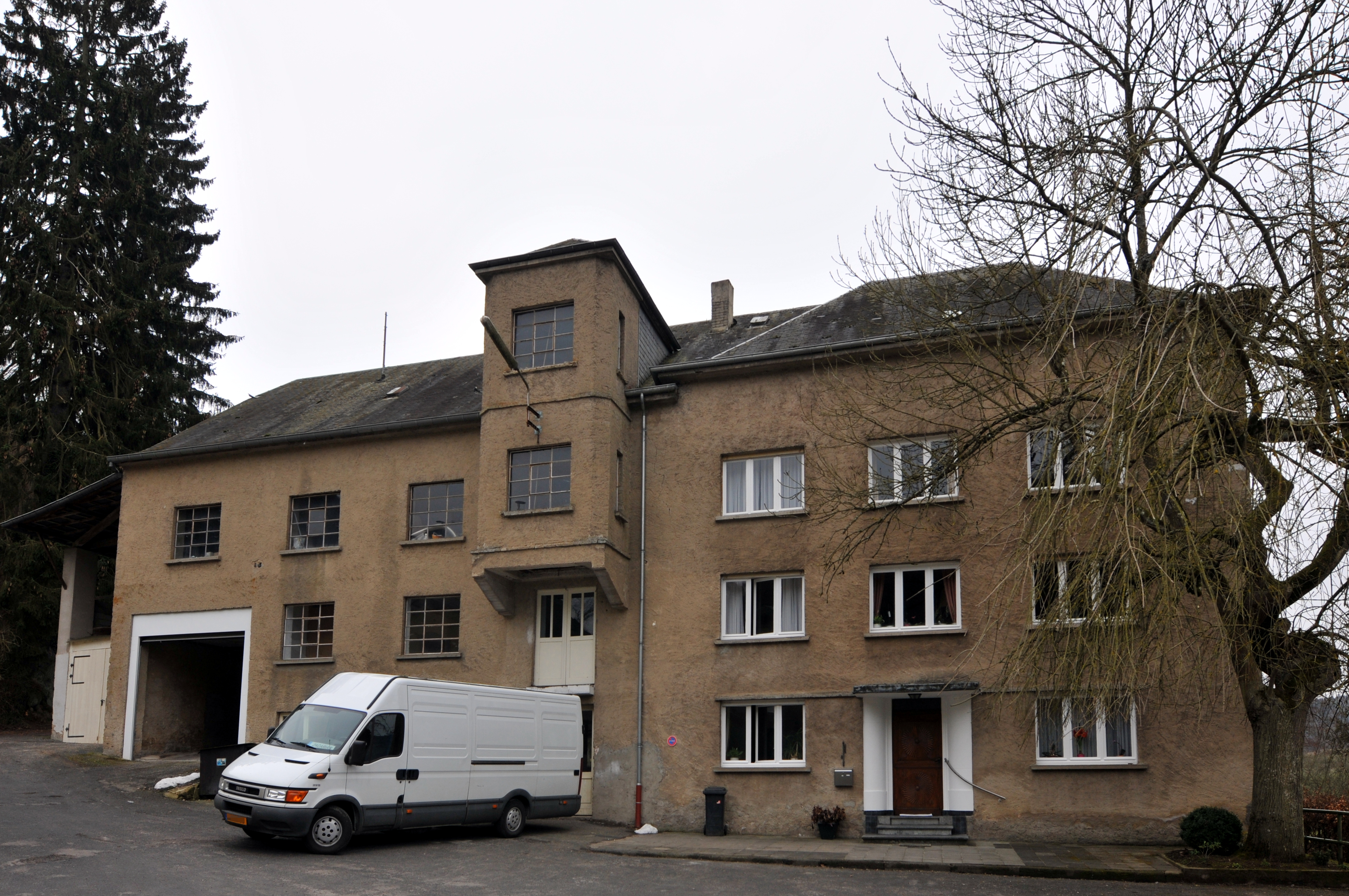
The mill the hamlet is named after in March 2013

Brichermillen is a former mill and hamlet in the commune of Contern. It is located by the Syre river, at an altitude of 264 meters on the border of the communes of Contern, Weiler-la-Tour and Dalheim. Brichermillen is on a short spur of a road which branches off the CR132 road between Syren and Moutfort; the road continues as a track until it reaches Syren. A few hundred meters northeast of the mill lies the Bricherhaff. Both buildings are owned by the same owner. Bricherhaff is on a separate road spur and is also atop the Syre. Brichermillen is located around 2 kilometres straight south of Contern.

== History ==
The mill was first mentioned in writing in 1689, but it is believed that there was already a mill there a long time ago. The mill changed owners several times and was rebuilt and enlarged. It has belonged to the Hemmen family since the end of the 19th century.

Until 1913, energy was gained by hydropower, then worked by electricity. During an explosion, the building was severely damaged in 1944 and was subsequently rebuilt in its current form. The mill business was discontinued in 1975, and since then part of the building has been converted to housing.

The name Bricher comes from the German word Bruch or Bruchwald, which is a supple forest.

== Geography ==
At Brichemillen the Syre splits in two and a small pond lies between the two streams a little to the southwest. A trail runs directly east of Brichermillen roughly following the border of Contern and Dalheim. Other trails lead up through the Bricherbesch and the Meidengergrendchen towards Medingen and the hill named Zennebierg. Opposite the CR132 is a freight railway line.
