= Eiter =

Eiter may refer to:

- Eiter (River), river in Lower Saxony, Germany
- Éiter, Luxembourg, town in the Commune of Contern
- Eiter (surname), list of people with that surname
