= Trudlerbaach =

Small brook in Luxembourg

Trudlerbaach Trudlerbrook
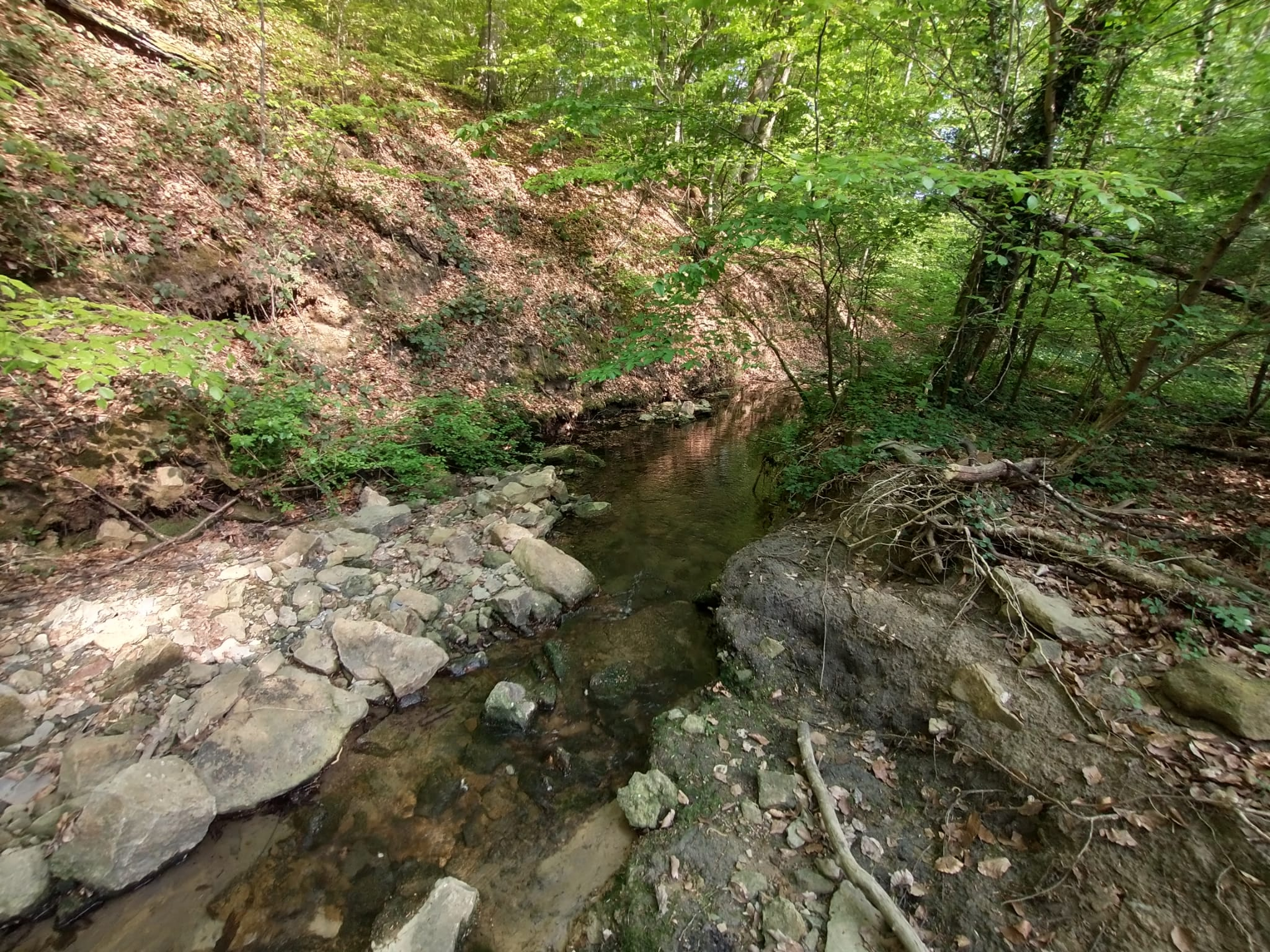
- Trudlerbaach flowing just south of Trudlermillen
- Native name: Troudlerbaach (Luxembourgish)

Location
- Country: Luxembourg
- Region: Luxembourg District
- Municipality: Contern/Weiler-la-Tour

Physical characteristics
- Source
  - location: Shaltgen, Contern
  - coordinates: 49.583405, 6.211662
  - elevation: 305 m
- Mouth: Syren
  - coordinates: 49.565225, 6.215395
  - elevation: 280 m
- Length: 2.6 km (1.6 mi)
- Width
  - minimum: 0.3 m (1 ft 0 in)
  - maximum: 4 m (13 ft)
- Depth
  - minimum: 0.1 m (3.9 in)
  - maximum: 0.4 m (1 ft 4 in)

Basin features
- Progression: Syre→Moselle→Rhine→North Sea
- River system: Syre
- Cities: Contern, Beriton, Faerschthaff, Trudlermillen, Syren, Moschelton, Poteschthaff (Shalten) (Wetzend)
- Bridges: 2

The Trudlerbaach (Luxembourgish: Troudlerbaach) is a small brook that runs from Contern to Syren, within the communes of Weiler-la-tour and Contern in Luxembourg, it is tributary of the river Syre however actually flows from a higher point in the land than the Syre itself and therefore the source of it is disputedly the source of the Syre.

The settlement of Trudlemillen sits on the river and was named after it, so is the nearby bus stop named Troudelermillen.
