= Trintange =

Village in Remich, Luxembourg

Coordinates: 49°34′N 6°17′E

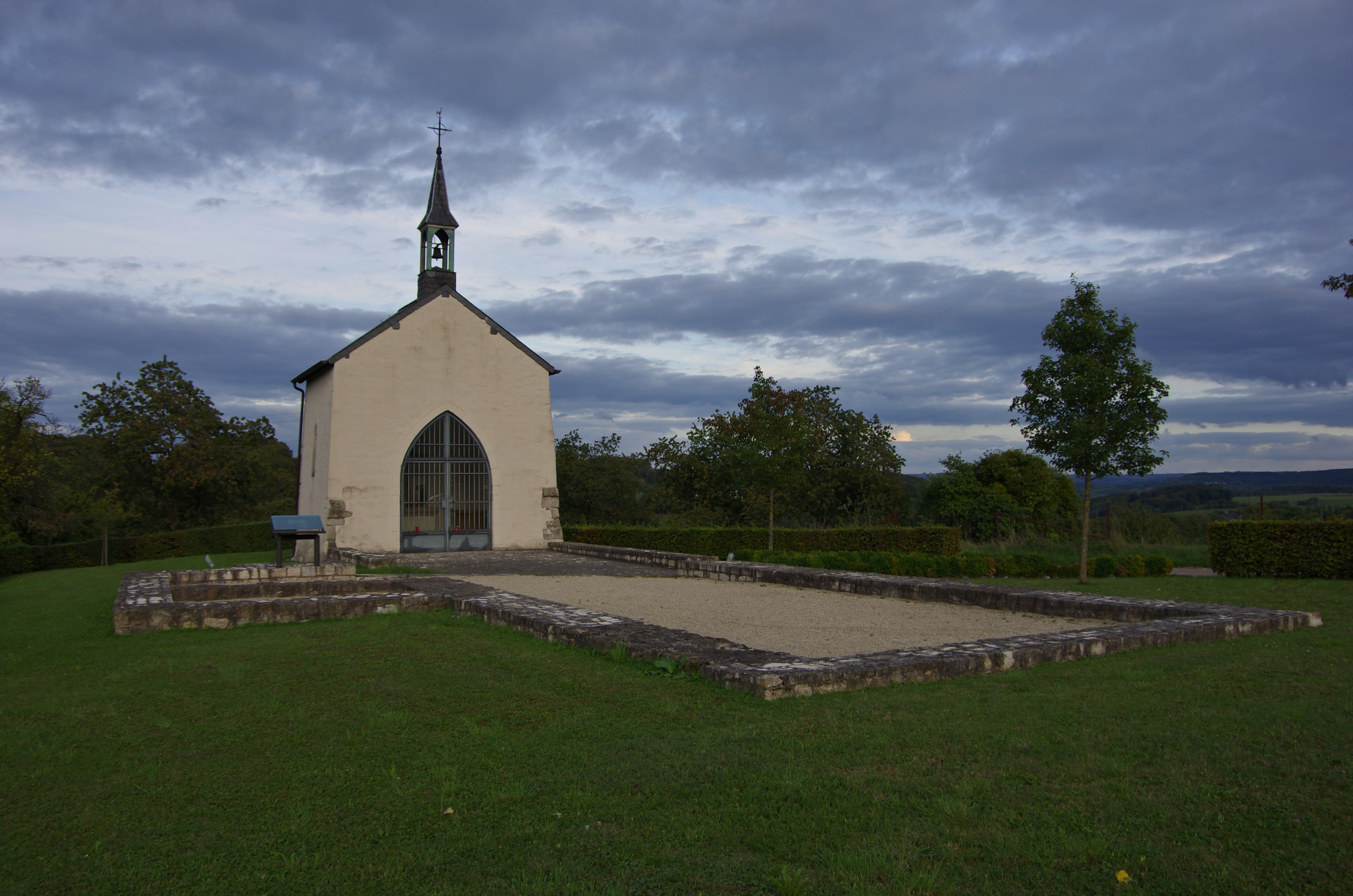
'Klaus' chapel on Klausberg, Trintange, Luxembourg

Trintange (French pronunciation: [tʁɛ̃tɑ̃ʒ]; Luxembourgish: Trënteng; German: Trintingen [ˈtʁɪntɪŋən]) is a small town in the commune of Bous-Waldbredimus, in south-eastern Luxembourg. As of September 2026, the town has a population of 406. It was the administrative centre of the commune of Waldbredimus until its merger with Bous.

== History ==
Trintange was mentioned as one of the many localities that were pillaged and devastated under Louis XIV of France. In 1680 under the orders of the French King, the Metz Chamber of Reunion demanded that the Duchy of Luxembourg cede all territories that had belonged at any point to lands surrendered to France since 1648. This was, essentially, the entire duchy with the exception of the capital and the few villages that were part of the priory of Luxembourg. However, several villages that did belong to the priory and were not claimed by France, were also destroyed, around 33 localities including Trintange, Ersange and Roedt.

=== "Klaus" chapel of St Stephen ===
Trintange contains the "Klaus" chapel on the "Klausberg", also known as the Stephansberg or "St Stephen's hill" (Luxembourgish: Stiewesbierg; French: Mont-St-Étienne). The current chapel building represents the remains of what was once a significantly larger building. It is highly likely that the building on the Stephansberg was once a parish church — it is not entirely clear of how big a parish. Indicators that this was a parish church, rather than just a chapel, include the size of the original building, and the fact that it was evidently rebuilt several times. What is known is that in the 13th century the parish moved to Waldbredimus. The current chapel seems to date from the 15th or early 16th centuries.

After the French Concordat of 1801, in 1806 in the commune of Waldbredimus a second parish was established alongside the parish of Waldbredimus, with government salary, on the Stephansberg. In 1808, this parish counted 284 souls. However, it contained no clergy house, or even a cemetery. Four parish priests were appointed one after another over the next 20 years, who received pay but remained absent from the parish. The parishioners were tended to by the priest of Waldbredimus, as they previously had been.

Through decree of 7 January 1827, the parish of the Stephansberg was dissolved, having never really taken form except on paper.

By royal-grand ducal decree of 28 July 1851 and approval of the Apostolic Pro-Vicar of 4 August 1851, Trintange, Ersange and Roedt were once again carved off from the parish of Waldbredimus and given their own parish.

=== Revolutionary Wars ===
Trintange's inhabitants were affected by the French Revolutionary Wars. In August 1792 the Prussian main army on their campaign against France set up their headquarters on the Moutfort plateau and plain and at Pleitrange; they did the same during their later retreat. In late 1792 and early 1793 the Austrian army had a field hospital in Ersange, possibly in connection with an army camp. Several soldiers of the defeated army who died of the "foul fever" were buried near the hermitage chapel on the Stephansberg at Ersange.

=== 1946 plane crash ===
On the afternoon of 18 March 1946, four fighter planes appeared over Trintange. These were Republic P-47 Thunderbolt fighters piloted by French forces stationed in occupied Germany. While they were practising aerial combat, at one point two of them collided, and immediately crashed to the ground. One of the planes crashed in the middle of the village, starting a fire. The pilot bailed out but was not able to open his parachute due to the low altitude, and died. The second plane crashed between Medingen and Dalheim, where it also exploded on impact.
