= Erpeldange (disambiguation) =

Erpeldange may refer to:

- Erpeldange-sur-Sûre, a town and commune in north-eastern Luxembourg
- Erpeldange, Bous-Waldbredimus, a small town in the commune of Bous-Waldbredimus, in south-eastern Luxembourg
- Erpeldange, Wiltz, a small town in the commune of Wiltz, in northern Luxembourg
