= Bous, Luxembourg =

Town and former commune in Remich canton, Luxembourg

Bous
- Commune
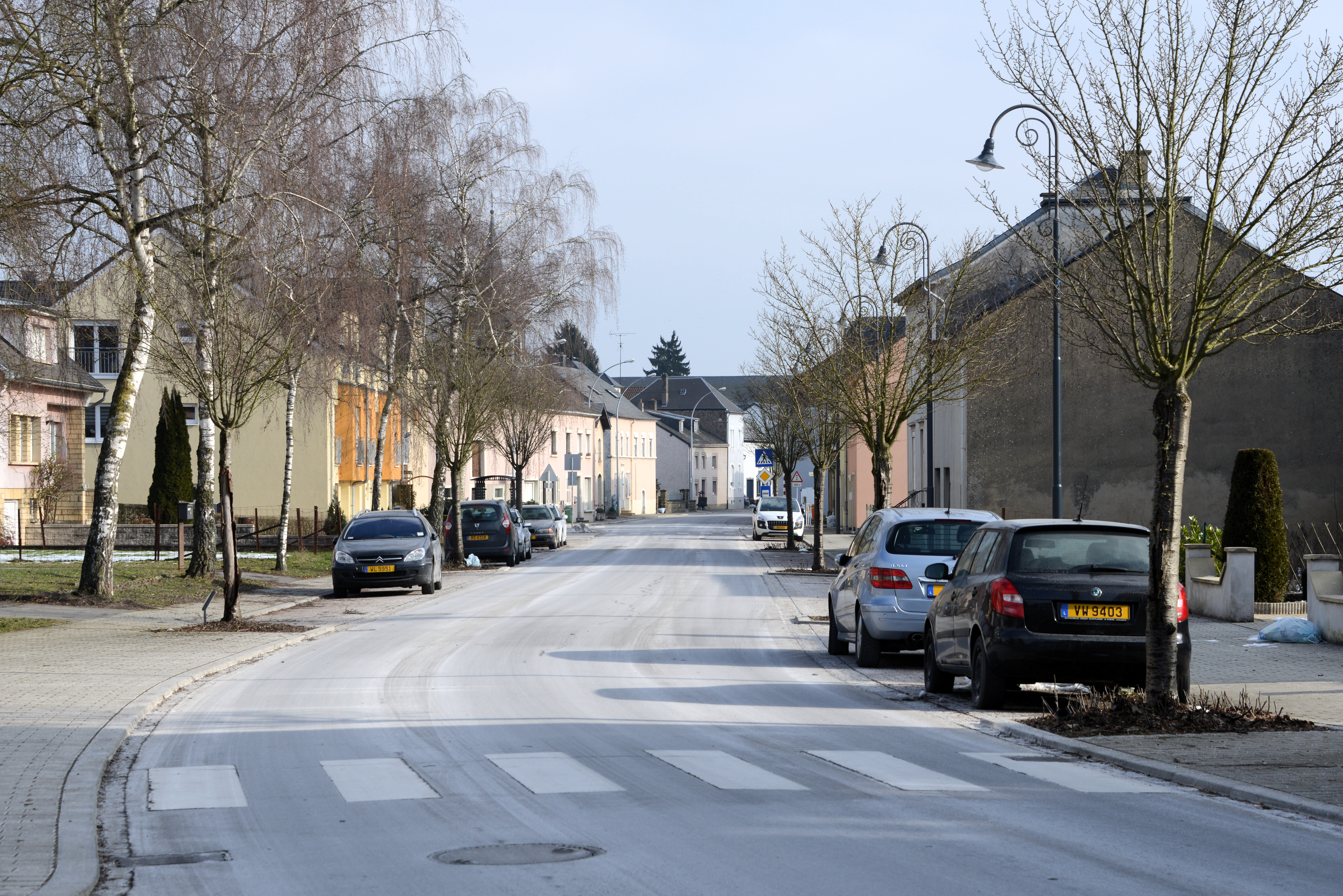

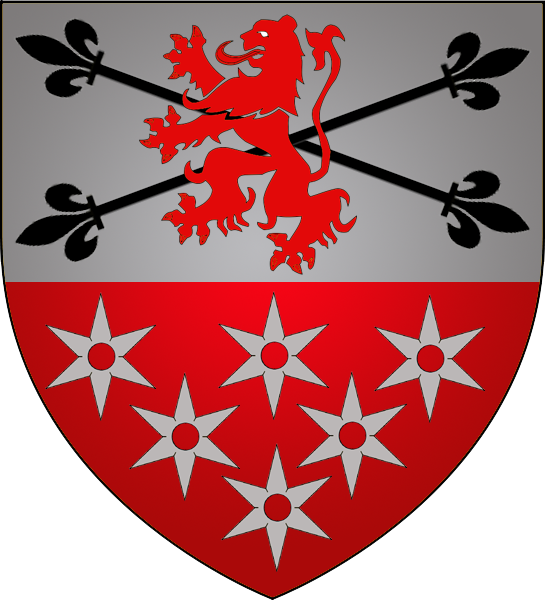
- Coat of arms

- Map of Luxembourg with Bous highlighted in orange, and the canton in dark red
- Coordinates: 49.5556°N 6.3306°E
- Country: Luxembourg
- Canton: Remich
- Time zone: UTC+1 (CET)
  - Summer (DST): UTC+2 (CEST)
- LAU 2: LU0001201
- Website: bous.lu

Bous (Luxembourgish pronunciation: [ˈbuːs]) is a former commune and small town in south-eastern Luxembourg. It is part of the canton of Remich.

As of September 2026, the town of Bous, which lies in the east of the commune, has a population of 753.

Until 31 August 2023, it was a commune. On 1 September 2023, the commune was merged with Waldbredimus to form the new commune of Bous-Waldbredimus.

== Former commune ==
The former commune consisted of the villages:

- Assel (Aassel)
- Bous
- Erpeldange (Erpeldingen, Ierpeldeng)
- Rolling (Rolleng)
- Éimerengerhaff (lieu-dit)
- Heisbuergerhaff (lieu-dit)
- Herdermillen (lieu-dit)
- Scheierbierg (lieu-dit)

== Population ==
Historical population

Year	Pop.	±%
1821	1,217	—
1851	1,535	+26.1%
1900	1,372	−10.6%
1910	1,133	−17.4%
1922	991	−12.5%
1935	916	−7.6%

Year	Pop.	±%
1947	892	−2.6%
1960	813	−8.9%
1970	776	−4.6%
1981	747	−3.7%
1990	809	+8.3%
2000	1,060	+31.0%

Year	Pop.	±%
2005	1,188	+12.1%
2010	1,319	+11.0%
2015	1,480	+12.2%
2020	1,669	+12.8%
2021	1,711	+2.5%

Source data
