= Oetrange =

Oetrange Éiter Oetringen
- Town
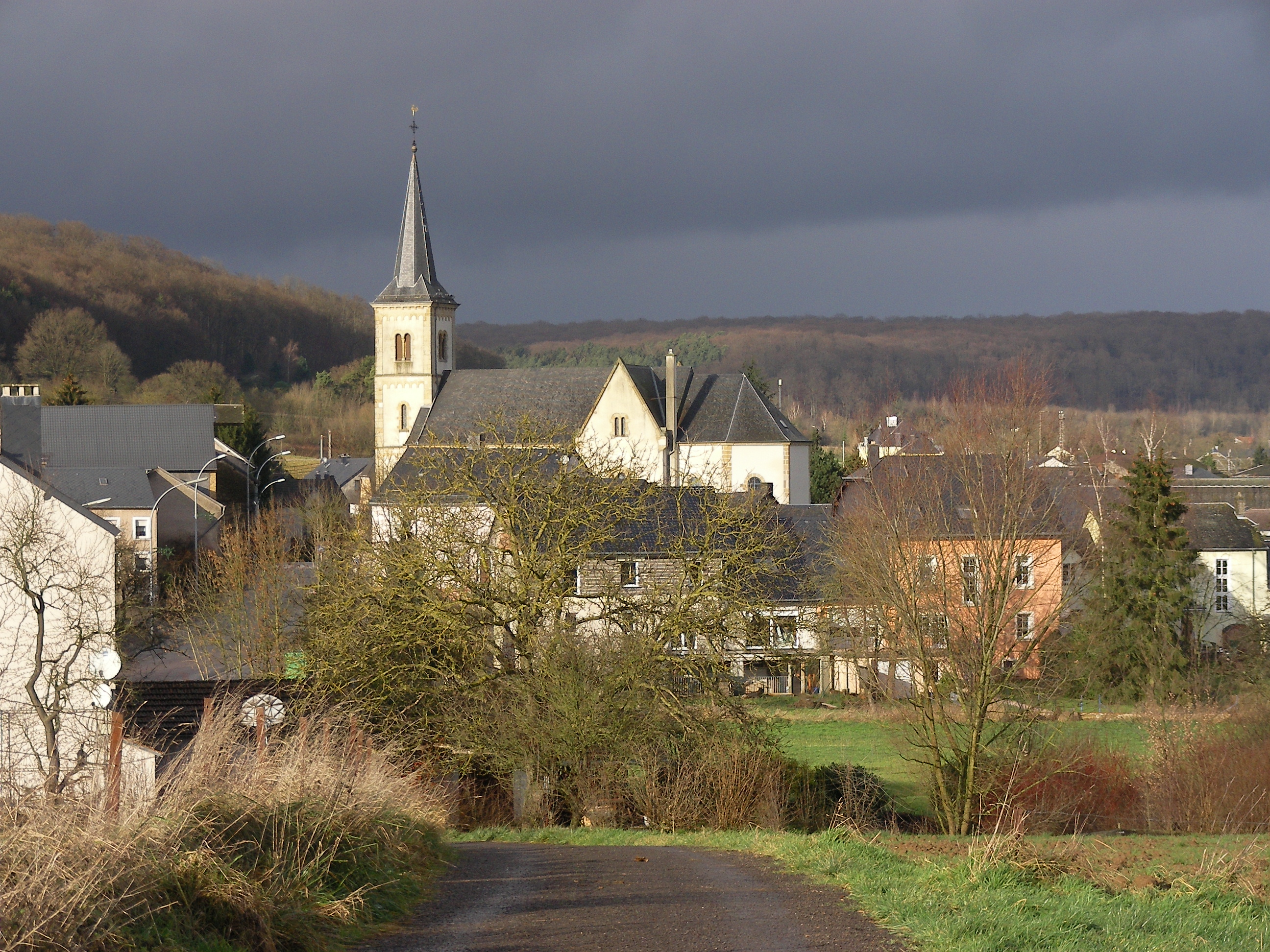
- The Church in Oetrange
- Interactive map of Oetrange
- Coordinates: 49°36′N 6°16′E
- Country: Luxembourg
- District: Luxembourg District
- Canton: Luxembourg
- Commune: Contern
- Elevation: 261 m (856 ft)

Population (2026)
  - Total: 1,071

Oetrange (Luxembourgish: Éiter, German: Oetringen) is a small town in the commune of Contern, in south-eastern Luxembourg. As of September 2026, the town has a population of 1,071.

The town is served by Oetrange railway station, which lies on CFL Line 30.

The secretariat of the European University Foundation - Campus Europae is in Oetrange.

== Geography ==
Oetrange is located in the Syredal, between the towns of Schrassig in the north and Moutfort in the south. Further neighbouring villages are the clock, Canach, Greveldange, Bous, Ersrange, and Sandweiler . The N2, the main connecting road between Remich and the city, runs 2 kilometers south along the village. Nevertheless, a large part of the German border traffic passes through the bus lanes through Oetrange to get to work in the city.

== History ==
=== History ===
Settlement traces in the caves and under the rocks, on both sides of the river Kackeschbach, not far from the Eitermillen, indicate a prehistoric settlement in the vicinity of Eiter. Nic Thill, a hobby archaeologist and former teacher of Etter, made significant discoveries in the 1930s. He found, first in the quarry at the Kackerter Haff and later also at Huelen Äer (a hank southwest of the heath ), prehistoric animal bones and handicrafts. This makes Oetrange one of the oldest settlements in Luxembourg.

=== Roman Traces ===
Roman tombs were discovered in the corner hole, and remains of a Roman villa with water pipes were found in the wilderness . The most important Roman settlement was located at "Hacca", near the present Hakenhaff . There stood a large Roman villa on the Kiem, an important military and trade route that connected Metz with Trier and led through Oetrange. A small road, a so-called diverticulum, which connects the roads from Reims to Trier and those from Metz to Trier connected to each other, led to the "Hacca" on the main road. The villa at "Hacca" was probably a post where the passers-by of the "diverticulum" were controlled.

=== Frankish savings ===
The German name, Ötringen, indicates a Frankish origin. Place names with the suffix "-ingen", usually go back to the pre-Carolingian settlement period. It is probable that, even before the end of the migration, Frankish and Germanic families settled in Oetrange. One proof of this occupation is the Frankish tombs that were uncovered during the construction of the road, between Oetrange and Canach, towards the end of the nineteenth century . The Franks and the Alemanni, who immigrated to late antiquity, destroyed the Roman villas before settling in the area. The Romans, were in their time, the supple corners along the sir, always got off their feet, and preferred to build on the heads above the valley, the new invaders, in contrast, moved slowly into the valley, to get there to build their settlements. The village, in its present form, was therefore only created in the Frankish period. At that time, it also began to pull the sir straight.

=== Historical documents ===
The first evidence of mention of pus dates back to 1128 . In 938, the people of the Diocese of Trier suffered a severe drought. From then on, the inhabitants concerned had sworn to pilgrimage to Trier, should their area be heard after rain. When the rain came, the archbishop of Trier, Egbert of Trier, ordered in a letter the so-called banishment to Trier, which takes place every Wednesday on the third week after Easter .she should. Later, the more remote villages were allowed to make pilgrimages to Notre-Dame Abbey and Clausen . The abbot Folmar had received permission to move the pilgrimage from Bishop Bruno of Trier . In a letter dated 1128, Folmar claimed the privilege of Pope Honorius II., confirmed. 26 pairs are now pilgrimage to Clausen, one of the named pairs was Oetrange.

=== Origin of the village ===
After the migration, several invaders settled in the Syredal . The village that was created during that period was initially so small that it hardly deserved the title "Village". In those days, most of the villages were now composed of only a few, or even just a single farm. Even Otter was probably in the sixth century, only two to three yards large, with about 20 inhabitants. By the end of the first millennium, the population of Oetrange increased sharply. The number of farms had meanwhile increased, and Oetrange had become a real village. Exactly how many farms were there at that time is not known exactly. From the early Middle Ages, no documents about Otter have appeared yet.

=== Church ===
A church was built early on, certainly in the year 938 and probably as early as the seventh or eighth century AD.
