= Krähenkuhlenfleet =

River in Germany

Location
- Country: Germany
- State: Lower Saxony

Physical characteristics
- Mouth
  - location: Eiter
  - coordinates: 52.8997°N 8.9918°E
- Length: 15.1 km (9.4 mi)

Basin features
- Progression: Eiter→ Weser→ North Sea

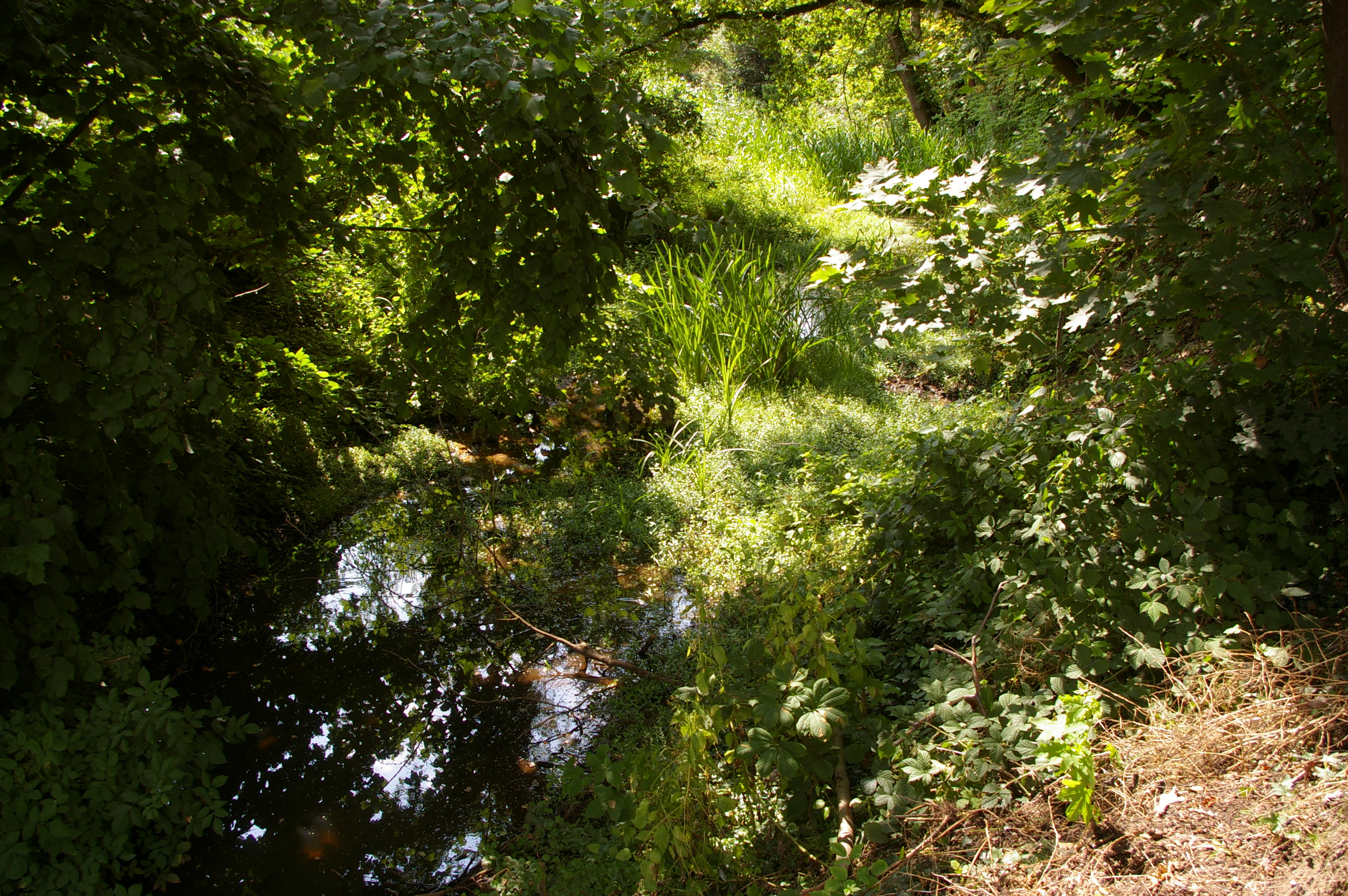
Krähenkuhlenfleet in the Schwarme district of Groß Borstel

Krähenkuhlenfleet is a river of Lower Saxony, Germany. It flows into the Eiter near Schwarme.

== See also ==
- List of rivers of Lower Saxony
