= Eitermillen =

Eitermillen Oetrange-Moulin
- Hamlet (Miil)
- Éitermillen
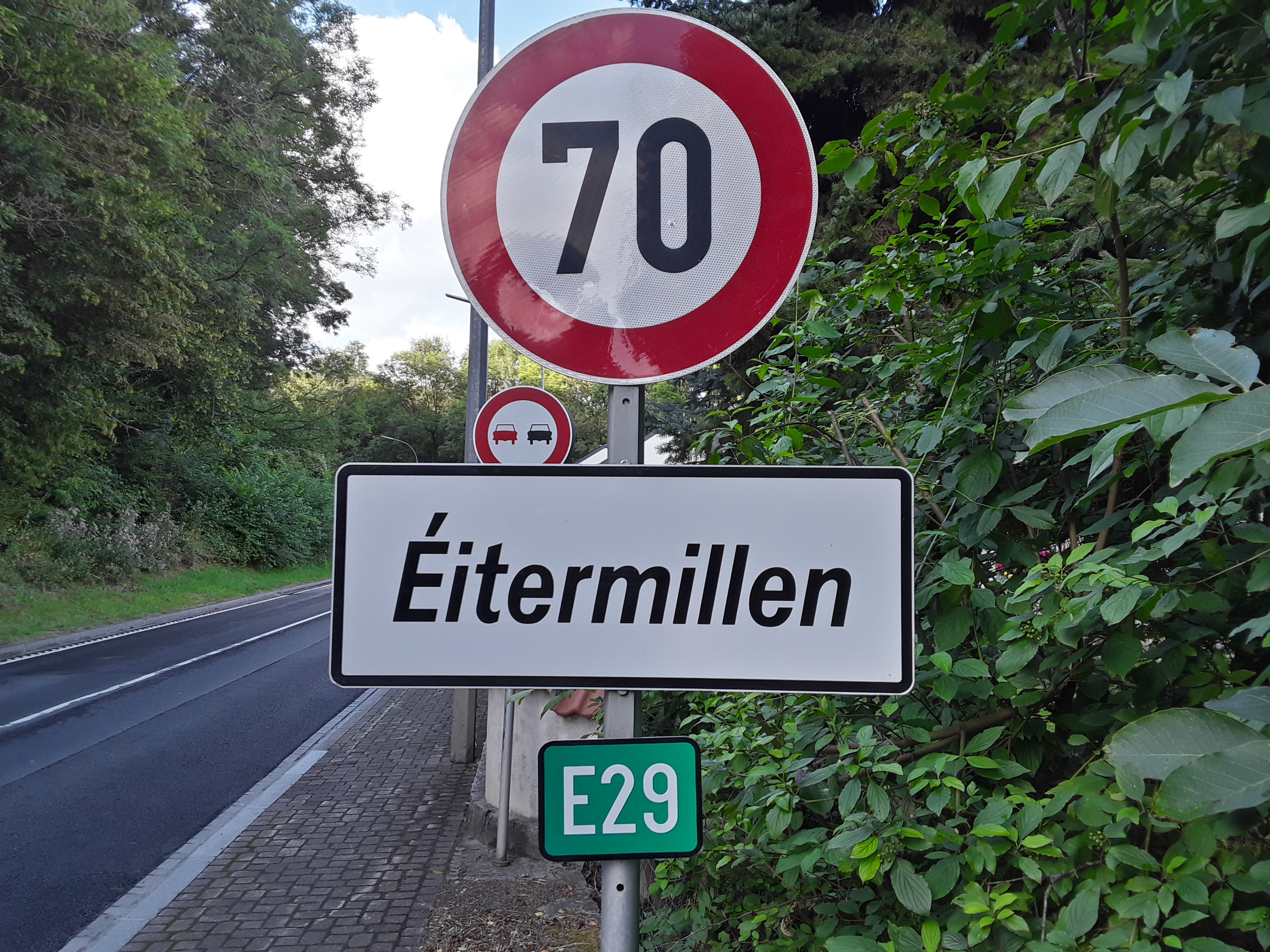
- The now defunct white signage used to indicate entry to the Lieu-Dit

- Location within Luxembourg
- Coordinates: 49.5794331°N 6.2566093°E
- Country: Luxembourg
- Canton: Luxembourg District
- Commune: Contern
- Locality: Oetrange
- Elevation: 265.35 m (870.6 ft)
- Time zone: UTC+1
  - Summer (DST): UTC+2
- Postal Code: L-5331
- Post Town: Oetrange
- LAU 2: LU0000302

Éitermillen (French: Oetrange-Moulin), is a settlement and lieu-dit centred around a former mill near Moutfort in the Commune of Contern in Luxembourg. It is located on the E29 main road. Éitermillen is elevated 265 metres above sea level and is in post code area L-5331.

== History ==
Éitermillen as a settlement dates back to the 19th century. Oetrange-Moulin is listed in the 1890 census as a locality having a population of 8. Eitermillen was later mentioned in a decree in 1894 allowing for the path between Éitermillen and Kackerterhaff to see maintenance at the cost of 200 Luxembourgish Francs. An alternative name, "Moulin Diederich" is found on various maps from 1905 to 1939.

In 1897 a building was constructed on Route de Remich which is now central to Éitermillen. It was converted in 1969 to the restaurant "Hostellerie La Cheminée". In 1974 a traffic collision destroyed the chimney attached to the building. The restaurant would later become "Ma Langue Sourit", a 2 Michelin star restaurant.

== Geography ==
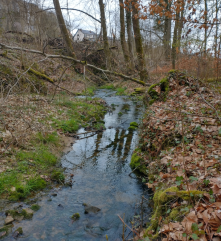
The Kackeschbaach flowing near Éitermillen

Éitermillen is located in the commune of Contern, in the Canton of Luxembourg. The settlement is grouped into both the cadastral section and locality of Oetrange. Centred on road N2, a part of European route E29, Éitermillen lies in the valley of the Kackeschbaach.
