= Waldbredimus =

Waldbredimus Waldbriedemes
- Commune
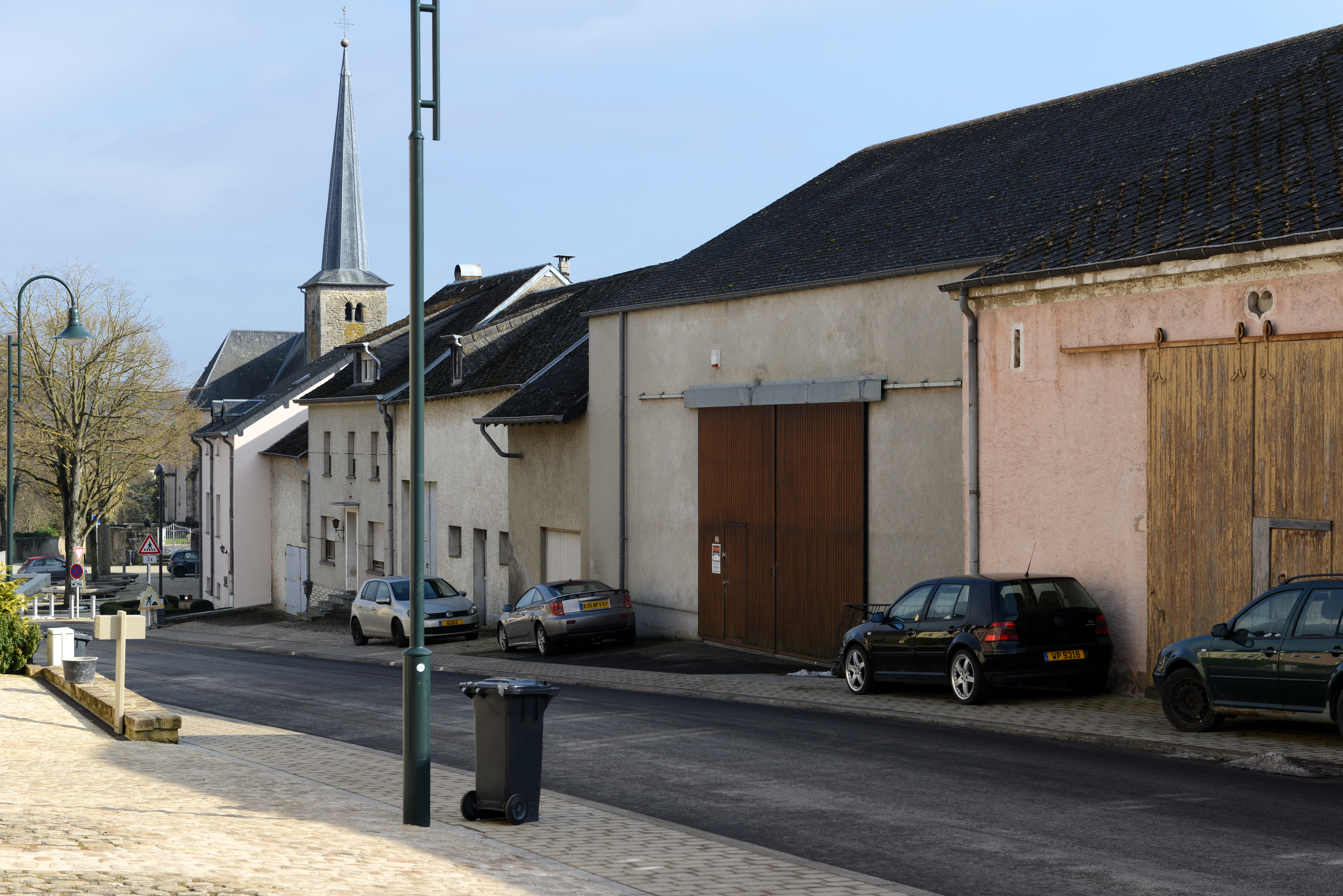

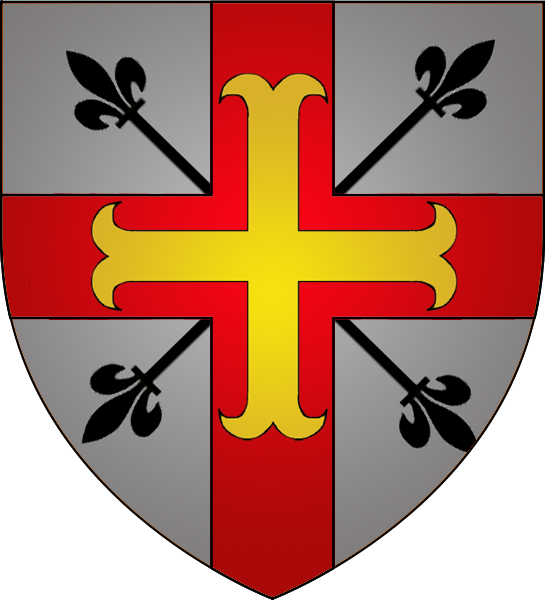
- Coat of arms

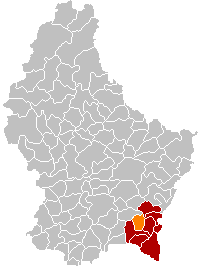
- Map of Luxembourg with Waldbredimus highlighted in orange, and the canton in dark red
- Coordinates: 49.5569°N 6.2875°E
- Country: Luxembourg
- Canton: Remich
  - Rank: 86th of 102
- Lowest elevation: 170 m (560 ft)
  - Rank: 13th of 102
  - Rank: ? of 102
  - Rank: ? of 102
- Time zone: UTC+1 (CET)
  - Summer (DST): UTC+2 (CEST)
- LAU 2: LU0001208
- Website: waldbredimus.lu

Waldbredimus (Luxembourgish: Waldbriedemes) is a small town and former commune in south-eastern Luxembourg. It is part of the canton of Remich, which is part of the district of Grevenmacher. The commune's administrative centre was Trintange.

Until 31 August 2023, Waldbredimus was a separate commune. On 1 September 2023, it merged with Bous to form the new commune of Bous-Waldbredimus.

As of September 2026, the town of Waldbredimus, which lies in the centre of the former commune, has a population of 661.

== Former commune ==
The former commune consisted of the villages:

- Ersange (Ierseng)
- Roedt (Réid)
- Trintange (Trintingen, Trënteng)
- Waldbredimus (Waldbriedemes)
- Gondel (lieu-dit)
- Gondeler Millen (lieu-dit)

=== Mayors ===
- N. Spanier (1843-1849)
- J. Goergen (1849-1861)
- Nic. Ehlinger (1861-1884)
- Heinr. Fischer (1885-1914)
- Christoph Ries (1915-1917)
- Heinr. Robert (1918-)
- Nikolaus Fisch (1928)
- August Kayl (1946-1952)
- Edmond Klensch (-1975)
- Jos. Rennel (-1983) (Note: Died in a car crash)
- Joseph Gengler (1984-)
- Joseph Ruppert (1990-1999)
- John Rennel (1999-2004) (Note: Ended in vote of no confidence)
- Jean Terens (2004-2008)
- Louis Oberhag (2008-2020)
- Thomas Wolter (2020-)

== Church ==
The parish of Waldbredimus dates to the time of Charlemagne. In 1214 Gerhard, the Abbot of Munster, received it in a land swap. Already in the Early Middle Ages (around the 11th/12h centuries), a church existed here in the Romanesque style. Of this original church, only the tower remains. The church was originally dedicated to the Holy Trinity. During the Thirty Years' War, Saint Sebastian became its patron saint, who was seen as a defender against the plague.

Around 1460, the present church was constructed in the Gothic style. It is cruciform, and possesses vaulting ribs supported by representational capitals. Of particular note are the altar of the Three Kings, the gravestones of the lords of Wiltheim and Gondelange, and the keystone bearing the coat of arms of the abbey of Munster.

In spite of frequent damage from fires and storms, the church remained intact throughout the centuries. Plans for an enlargement failed several times. It was not until 1884 that serious restoration work took place, with government subsidies. Amongst other things, the sacristy was connected to the mysterious upper room of the "leprous crusader" through a spiral staircase.

A second, more far-reaching restoration took place from 1964 to 1967, organised by the Commission des sites et monuments nationaux. During the re-working of the flooring, 24 graves from the time of 1675-1784 were found in the chancel and nave area.

== Twin towns – sister cities ==
Waldbredimus is twinned with:

- Hrušky, Czech Republic

== Population ==
Historical population

Year	Pop.	±%
1821	563	—
1851	887	+57.5%
1900	643	−27.5%
1910	654	+1.7%
1922	662	+1.2%
1935	540	−18.4%

Year	Pop.	±%
1947	533	−1.3%
1960	498	−6.6%
1970	482	−3.2%
1981	664	+37.8%
1990	707	+6.5%
2000	817	+15.6%

Year	Pop.	±%
2005	858	+5.0%
2010	966	+12.6%
2015	942	−2.5%
2020	1,240	+31.6%
2021	1,274	+2.7%

Source data
