= Syr River =

Syr River may refer to:

- Syre (river), Luxembourg
- Syr Darya, Kyrgyzstan, Uzbekistan
