= Bous-Waldbredimus =

- Commune
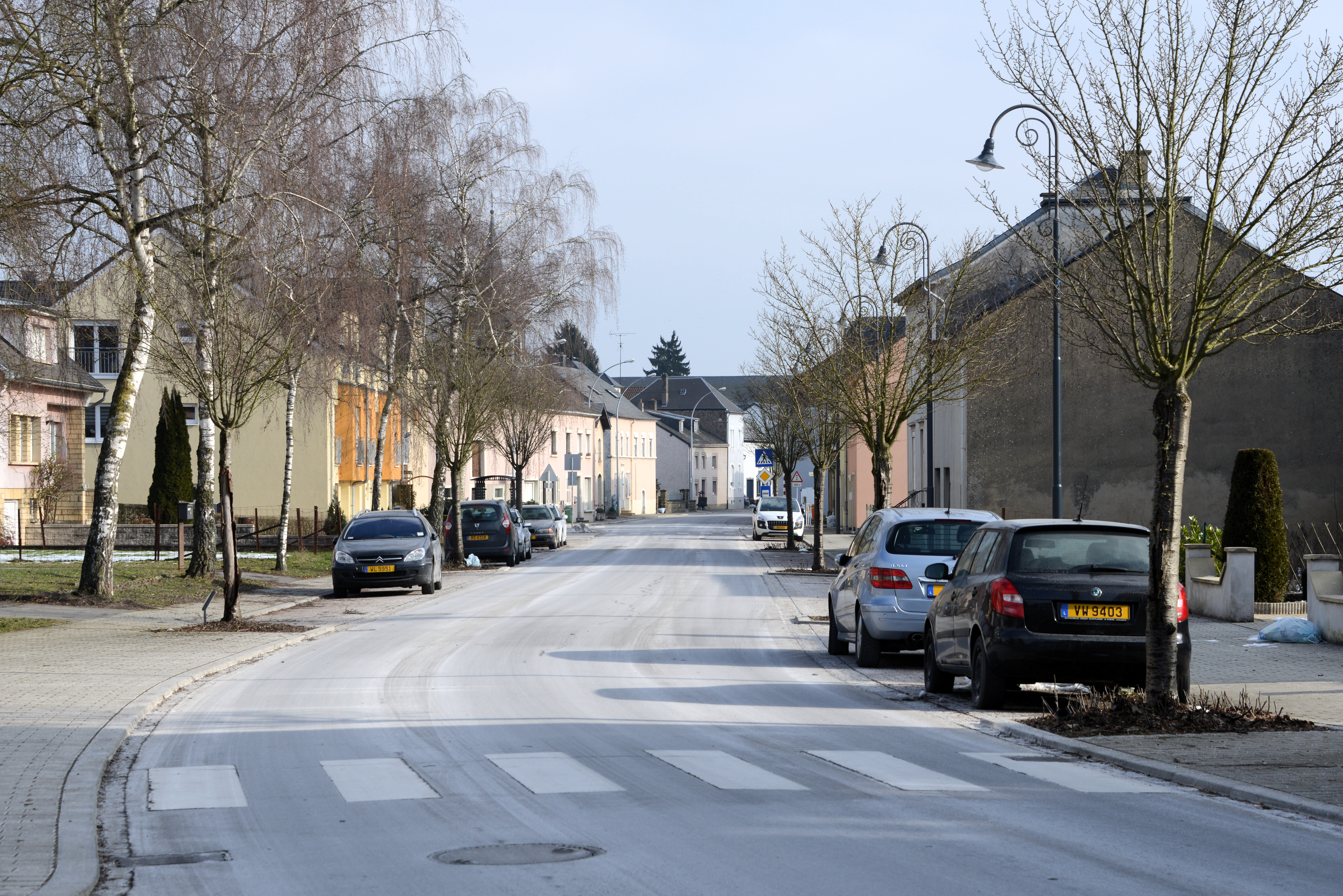

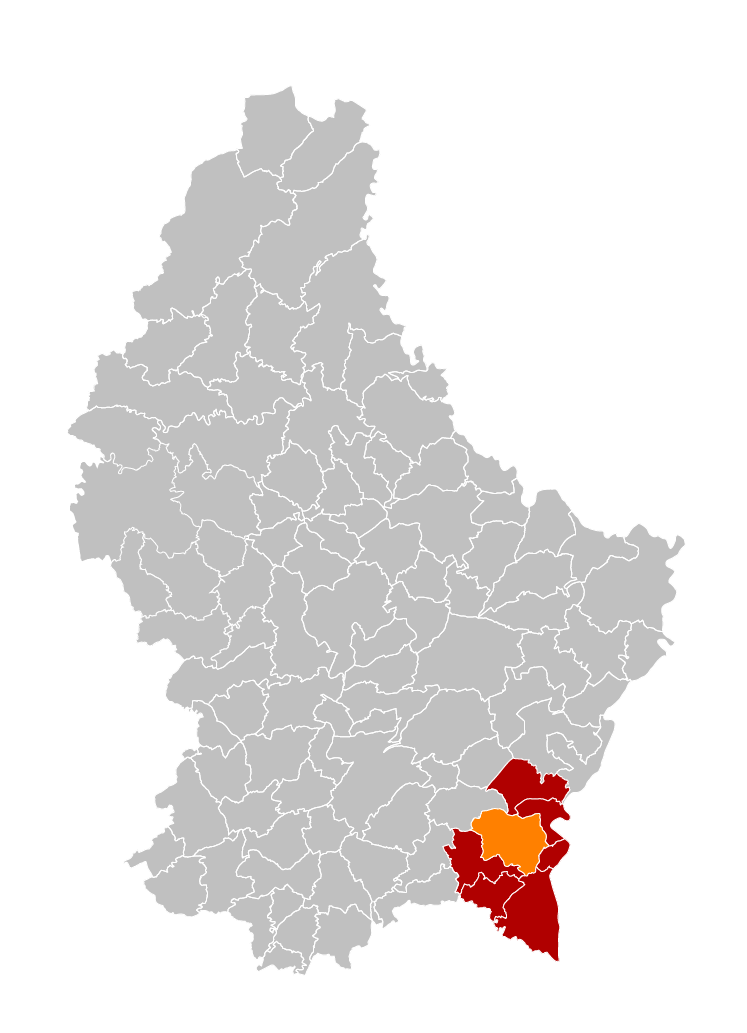
- Map of Luxembourg with Bous-Waldbredimus highlighted in orange, and the canton in dark red
- Coordinates: 49.5583°N 6.3083°E
- Country: Luxembourg
- Canton: Remich

Government
  - Mayor: Antonio Da Costa Araujo (Independent)

Area
  - Total: 28.00 km^{2} (10.81 sq mi)
  - Rank: ? of 100
- Highest elevation: 359 m (1,178 ft)
  - Rank: ? of 100

Population (2025)
  - Total: 3,270
  - Rank: 54th of 100
  - Density: 117/km^{2} (302/sq mi)
  - Rank: 61st of 100
- Time zone: UTC+1 (CET)
  - Summer (DST): UTC+2 (CEST)
- Website: bouswaldbredimus.lu

Bous-Waldbredimus is a commune in south-eastern Luxembourg. It is part of the canton of Remich. It was established on 1 September 2023 with the merger of the communes of Bous and Waldbredimus.

== History ==
According to the authorities responsible, the merger of the communities of Bous and Waldbredimus is about creating larger, sustainable communities that will be better positioned than the previous small communities by pooling resources and strengths. The state also pays a merger premium. In Bous, mergers with Stadtbredimus and Waldbredimus were possible, but in Waldbredimus there was also a merger with Weiler zum Turm and Dalheim. In a citizens' vote on 3 April 2022, 57% in Bous and 75% in Waldbredimus supported the merger of their communities. The merger would take effect on 1 September 2023.

== Geography ==
=== Populated places ===
The commune consists of the following localities. The communal seat is shown in bold:

- Bous Section:
  - Assel (Aassel)
  - **Bous**
  - Erpeldange (Erpeldingen, Ierpeldeng)
  - Rolling (Rolleng)
  - Éimerengerhaff (lieu-dit)
  - Heisbuergerhaff (lieu-dit)
  - Herdermillen (lieu-dit)
  - Scheierbierg (lieu-dit)

- Waldbredimus Section:
  - Ersange (Ierseng)
  - Roedt (Réid)
  - Trintange (Trintingen, Trënteng)
  - Waldbredimus (Waldbriedemes)
  - Gondel (lieu-dit)
  - Gondeler Millen (lieu-dit)
