= Hassel, Luxembourg =

Town in Luxembourg

Coordinates: 49°33′N 6°13′E

Hassel Haassel
- Town
- Location within Luxembourg

Population (2025)
  - Total: 742

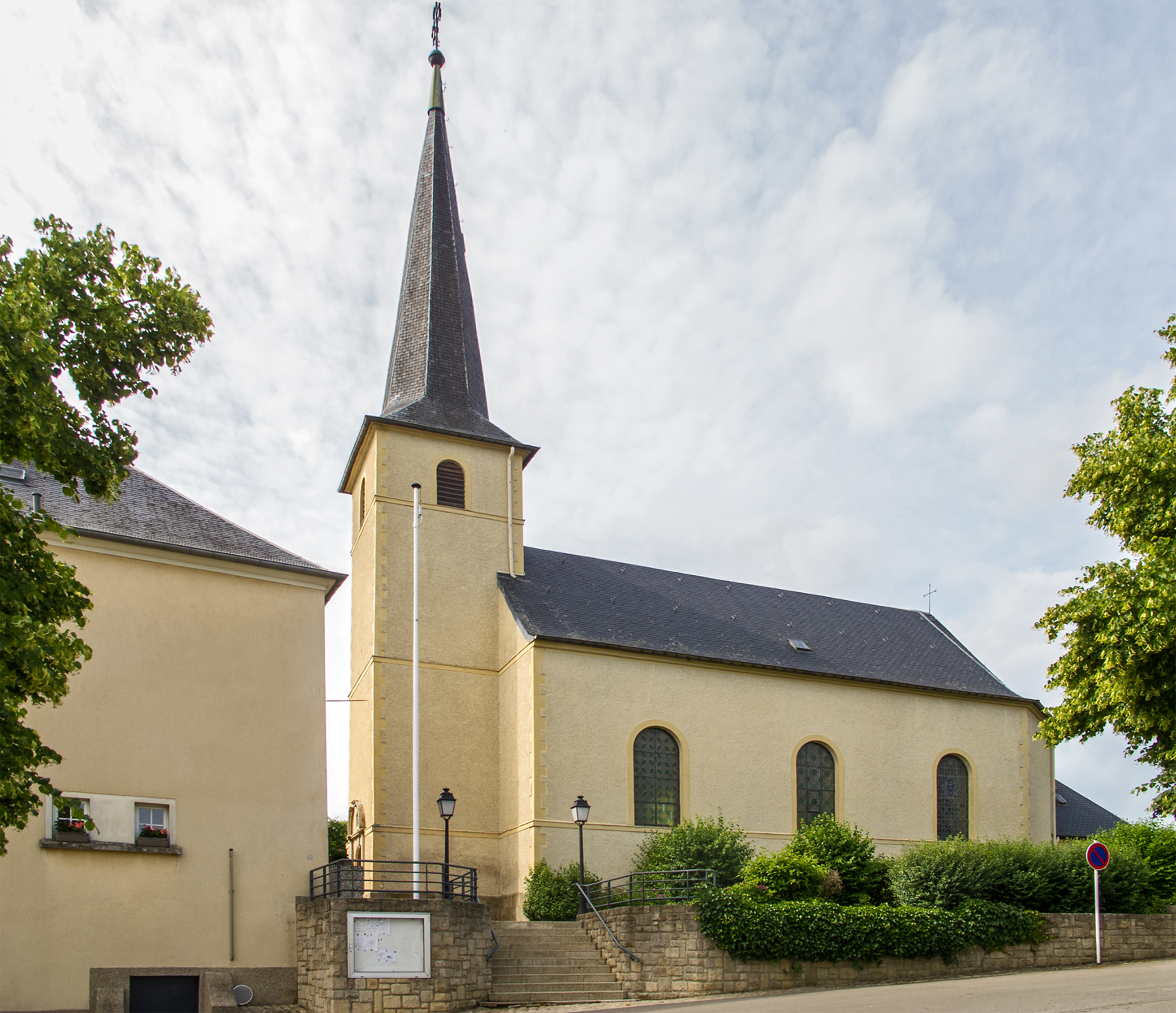
Church of Hassel

Hassel (German pronunciation: [ˈhasl̩]; Luxembourgish: Haassel) is a small town in southern Luxembourg, in the commune of Weiler-la-Tour, of which it is the administrative centre. As of September 2026, the town has a population of 746.
