= Rolling, Luxembourg =

Village in south-eastern Luxembourg

Coordinates: 49°33′N 6°19′E

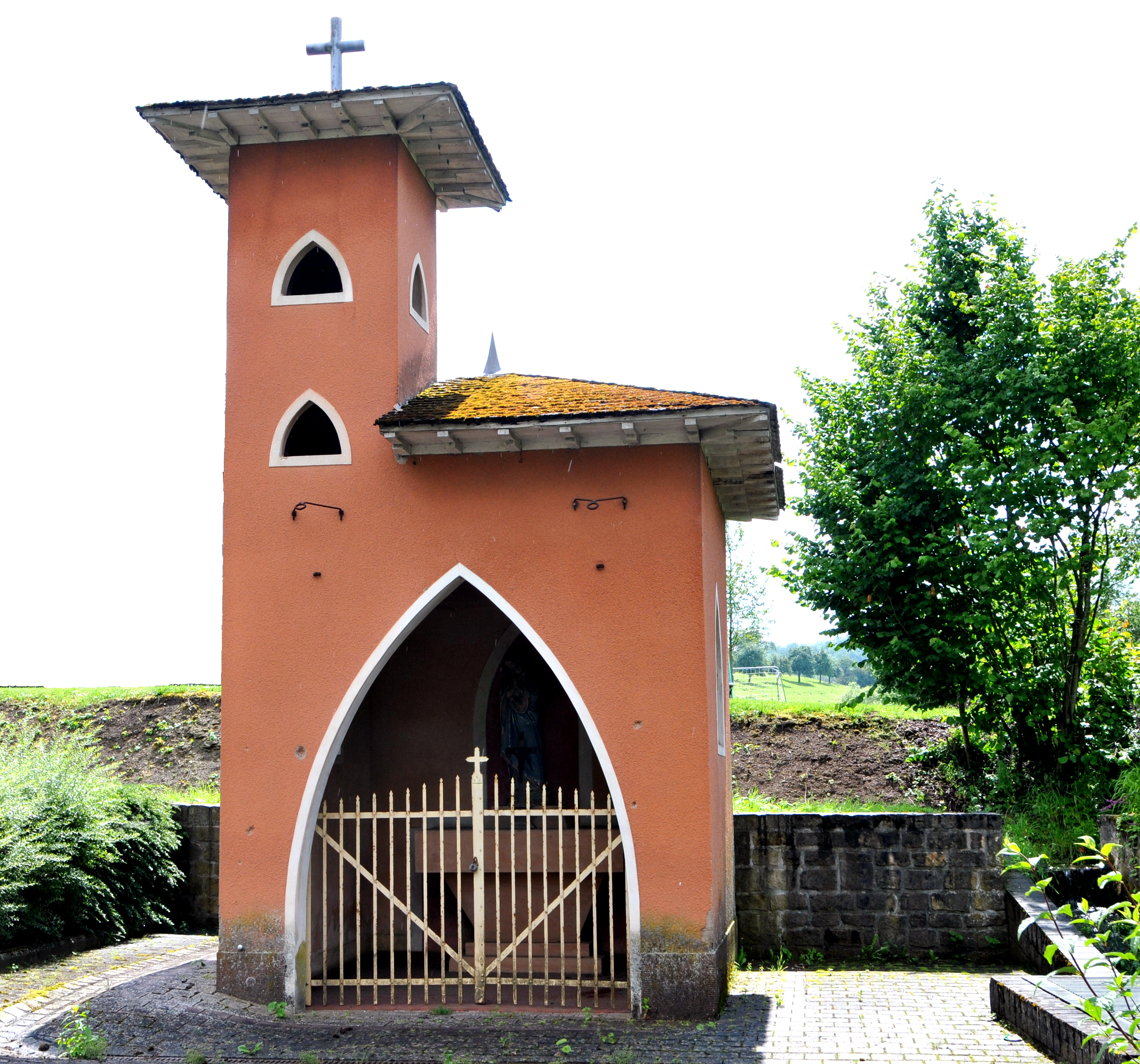
A small chapel in Rollingen

Rolling (German pronunciation: [ˈʁɔlɪŋ]; Luxembourgish: Rolleng) is a village in the commune of Bous-Waldbredimus, in south-eastern Luxembourg. As of September 2026, the village has a population of 177.
