= Assel, Luxembourg =

Village in Remich, Luxembourg

Assel Aassel
- Village
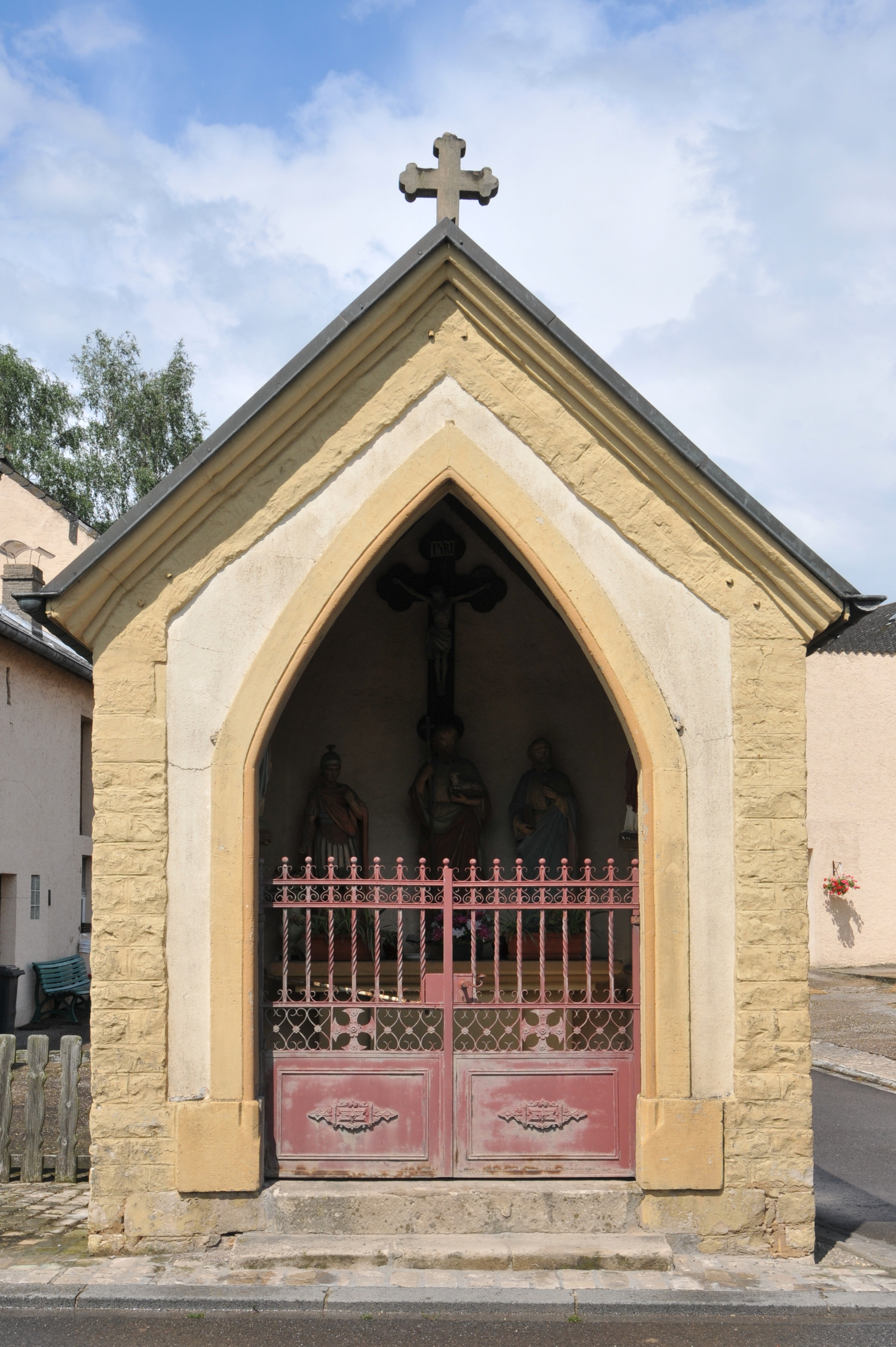
- Wayside chapel in Assel
- Interactive map of Assel
- Coordinates: 49°33′17″N 06°18′49″E
- Country: Luxembourg
- Canton: Canton of Remich
- Electoral district: East
- Commune: Bous-Waldbredimus

Population (2026)
  - Total: 219
- Postal code: L-5402

Assel (German pronunciation: [ˈasl̩]; Luxembourgish: Aassel) is a village in the commune of Bous-Waldbredimus, in south-eastern Luxembourg. As of September 2026, the village had a population of 241.
