= Erpeldange, Wiltz =

Coordinates: 49.9779°N 5.9461°E

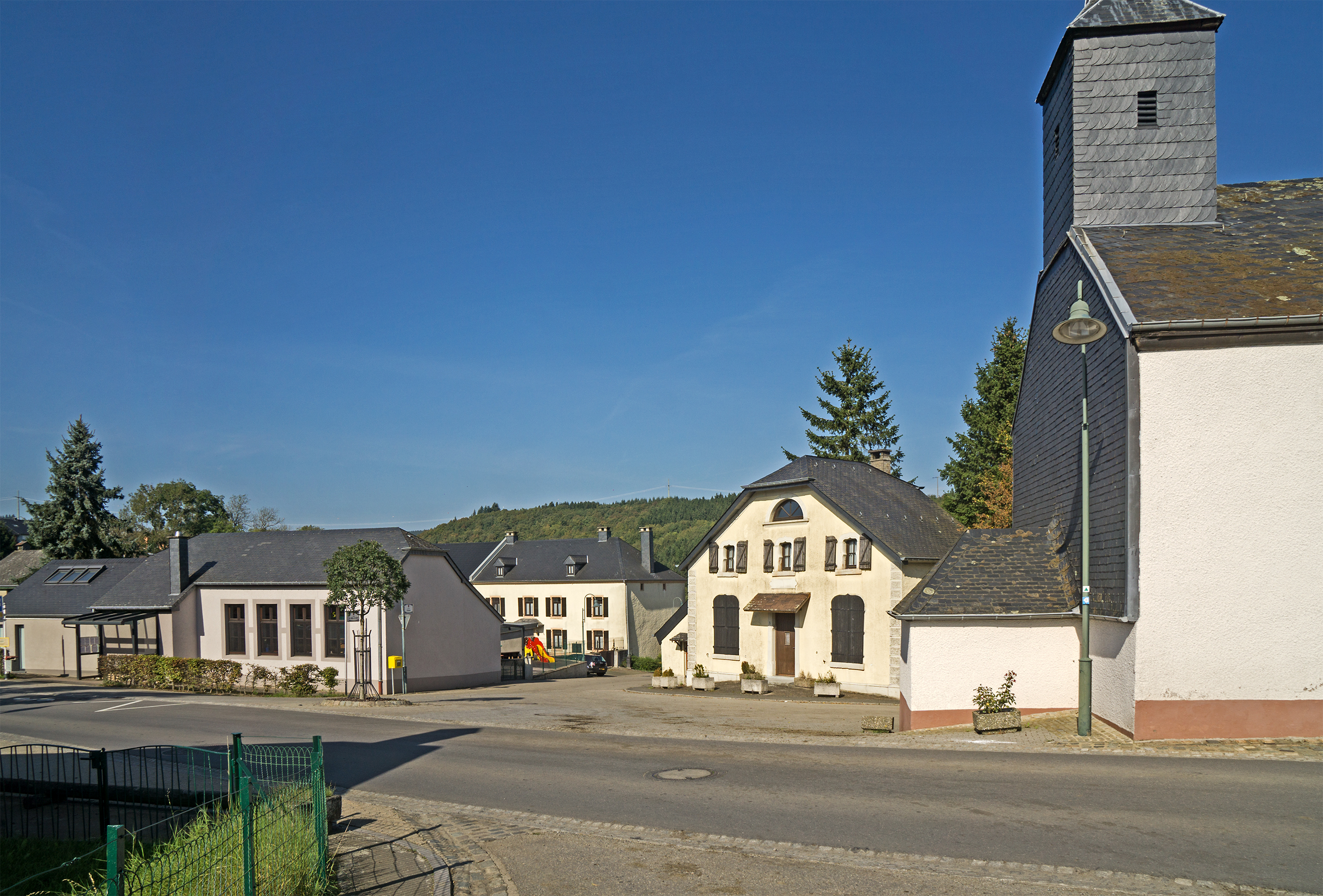
Street of Erpeldange near Wiltz

Erpeldange (Luxembourgish: Ierpeldeng, German: Erpeldingen) is a village in the commune of Wiltz, in northern Luxembourg. As of September 2026, the town has a population of 496.
