= Medingen, Luxembourg =

Coordinates: 49°34′N 6°15′E

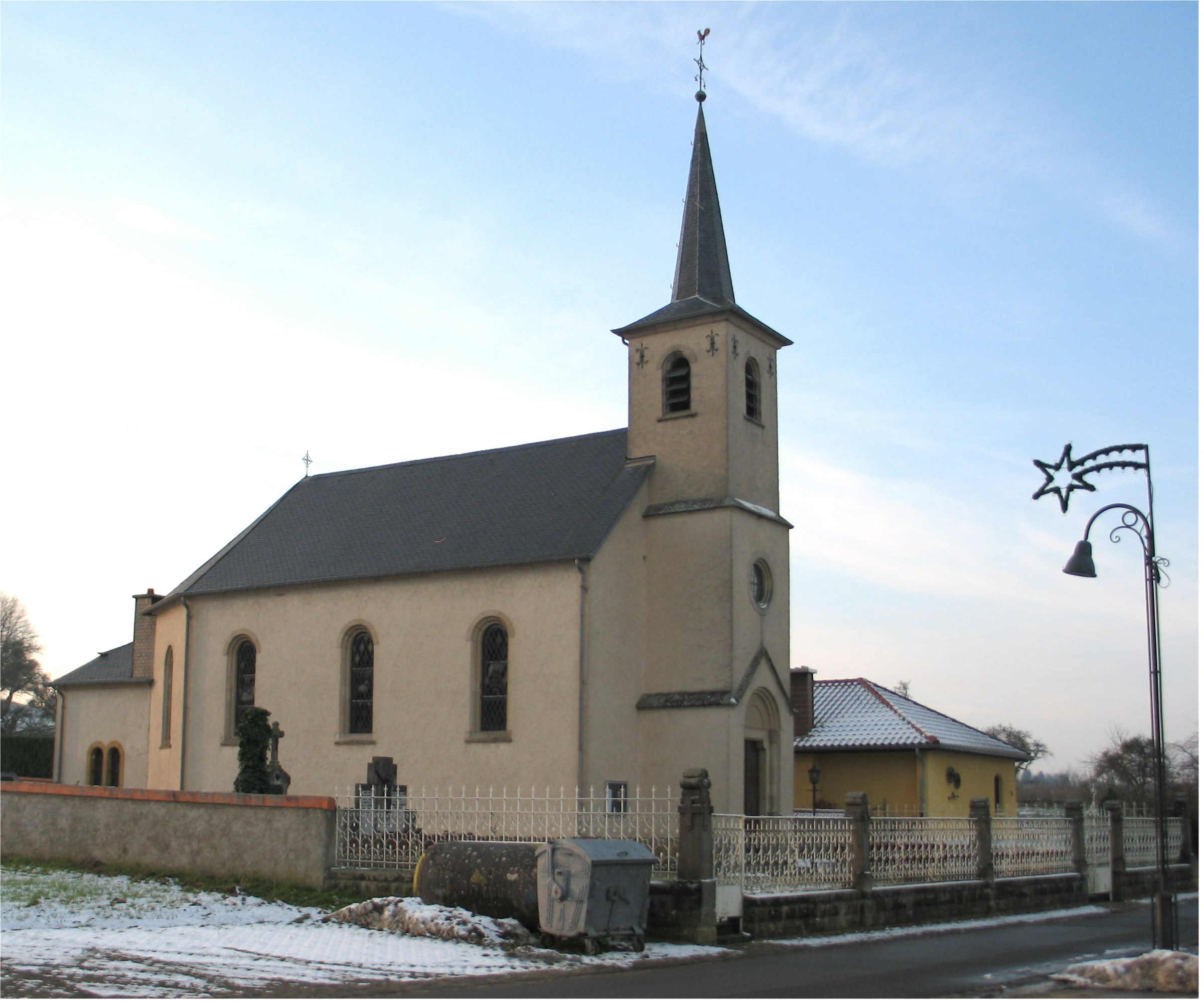
The church

Medingen (German pronunciation: [ˈmeːdɪŋən]; Luxembourgish: Méideng) is a village in the commune of Contern, in southern Luxembourg. As of September 2026, the village has a population of 127.

== Republic ==
A sign saying "Place de la République" hangs in the courtyard of the old school.

Its origins go back to a carnival. In the early 1980s, musical performances were held in the village for the carnival cape sessions, during which sketches were performed, in which, among other things, some local politicians were scolded. Aloyse Leytem wrote a sketch in which a republic was to be proclaimed in Medingen, and a republic sign was hung in the schoolyard.

The sign still hangs today.

== Geography ==
Medingen is located on a hill on a road between Moutfort and Dalheim. South of it is a large forest filled with various hiking, cycling and horse riding trails. To the west of Medingen are 2 small peak, one of which is named Zennebierg. To the west of that is a few small forests and a small trail which runs to Brichermillen.
