= Eiter (surname) =

Eiter is a surname. Notable people with the surname include:

- Angela Eiter (born 1986), Austrian climber
- Rob Eiter (born 1967), American wrestler
