= Ersange =

Village in Remich, Luxembourg

Coordinates: 49°34′N 6°17′E

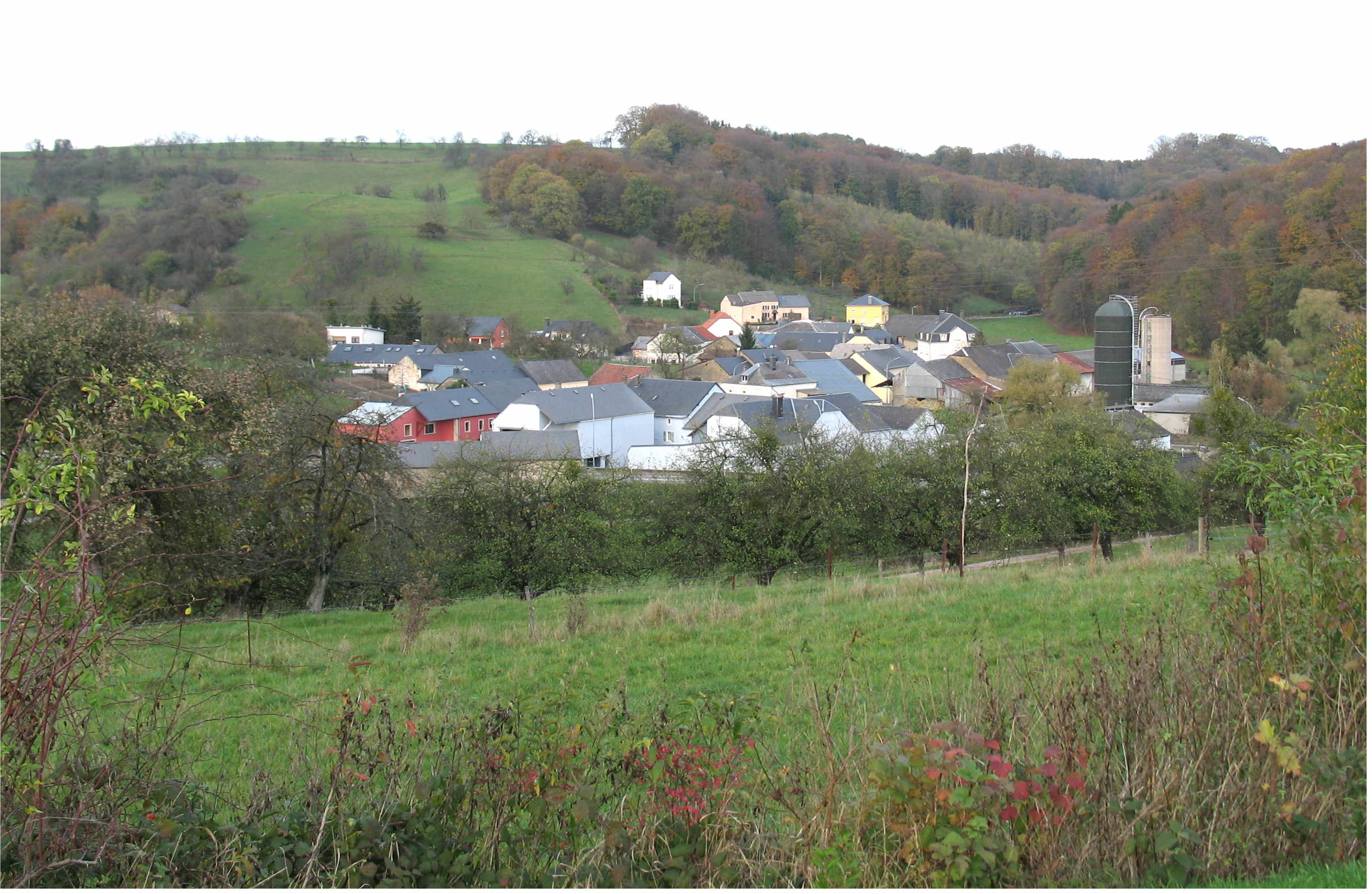
View of Ierseng

Ersange (Luxembourgish: Ierseng, German: Ersingen) is a village in the commune of Bous-Waldbredimus, in south-eastern Luxembourg. As of September 2026, the village has a population of 258.
