= Eiter (river) =

River in Germany

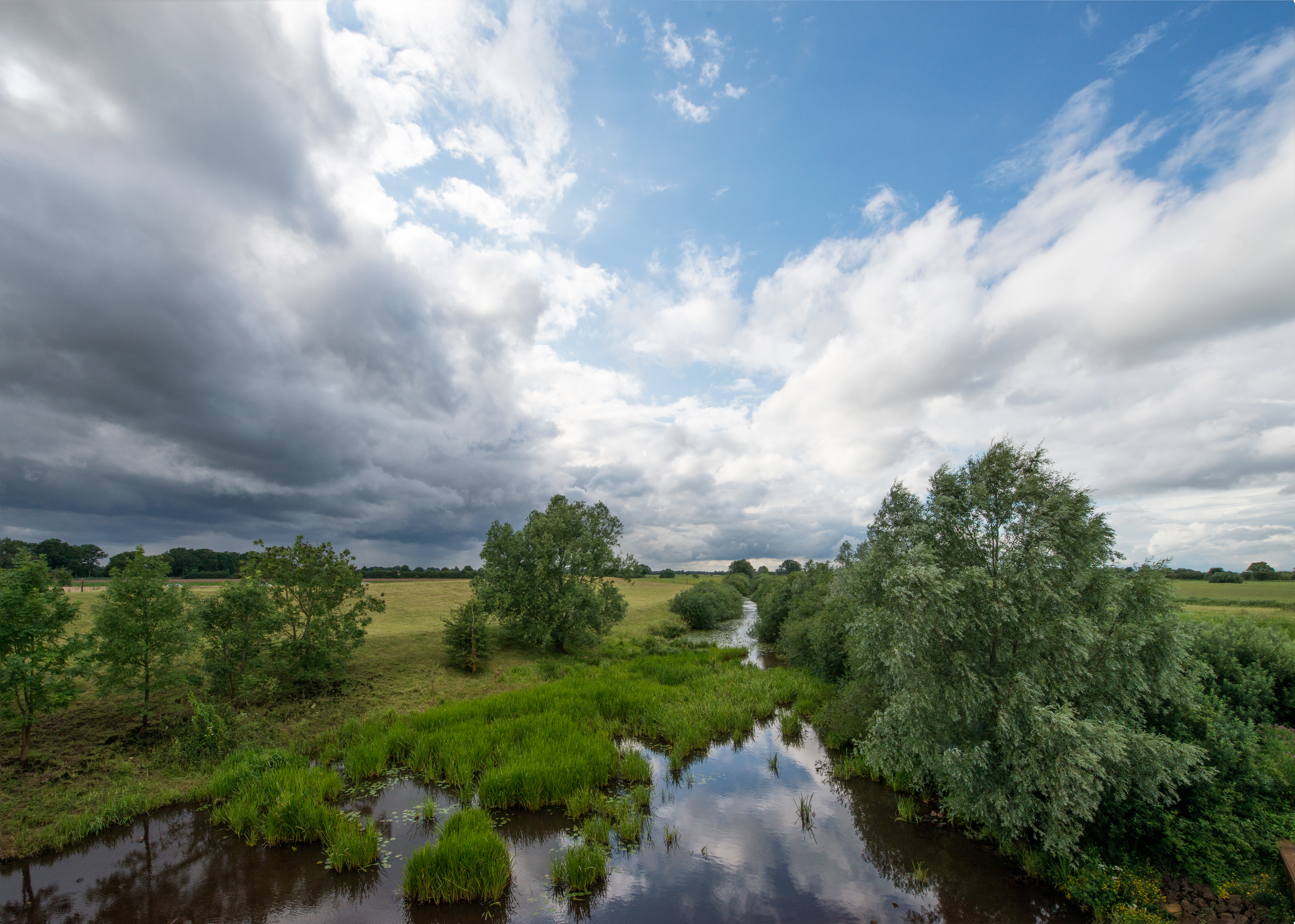

Location
- Country: Germany
- State: Lower Saxony

Physical characteristics
- Mouth
  - location: Weser
  - coordinates: 52°59′28″N 9°00′27″E
- Length: 22.2 km (13.8 mi)

Basin features
- Progression: Weser→ North Sea

Eiter is a river of Lower Saxony, Germany. It flows into the Weser near Thedinghausen.

== See also ==
- List of rivers of Lower Saxony
