= Erpeldange, Bous-Waldbredimus =

Coordinates: 49.5448°N 6.3266°E

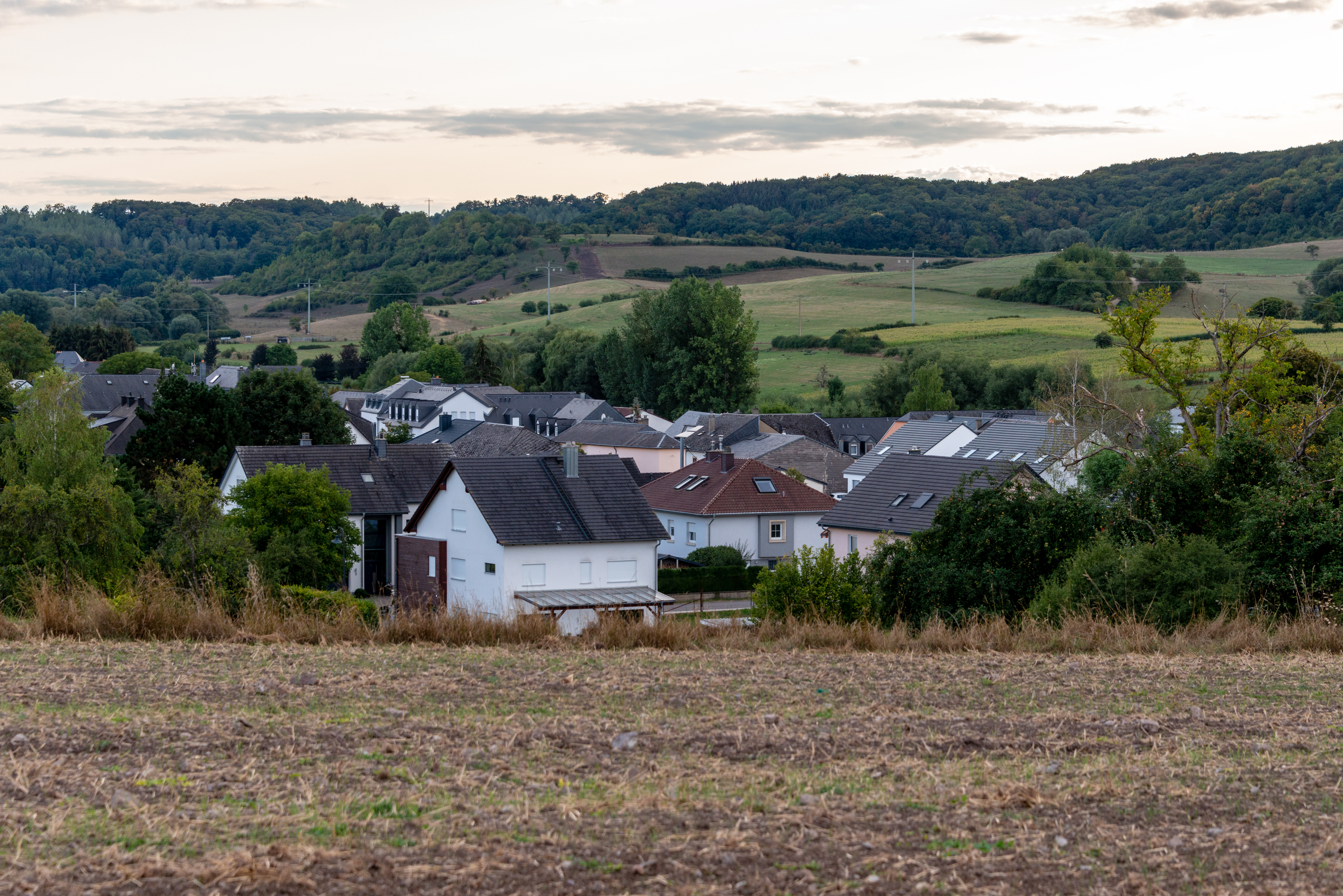
Seen from “Nainkiirchen” Cemetery

Erpeldange (Luxembourgish: Ierpeldeng, German: Erpeldingen) is a small town in the commune of Bous-Waldbredimus, in south-eastern Luxembourg. As of September 2026, the town has a population of 678.
