= Moutfort =

Village in Luxembourg

Coordinates: 49°35′10″N 6°15′30″E

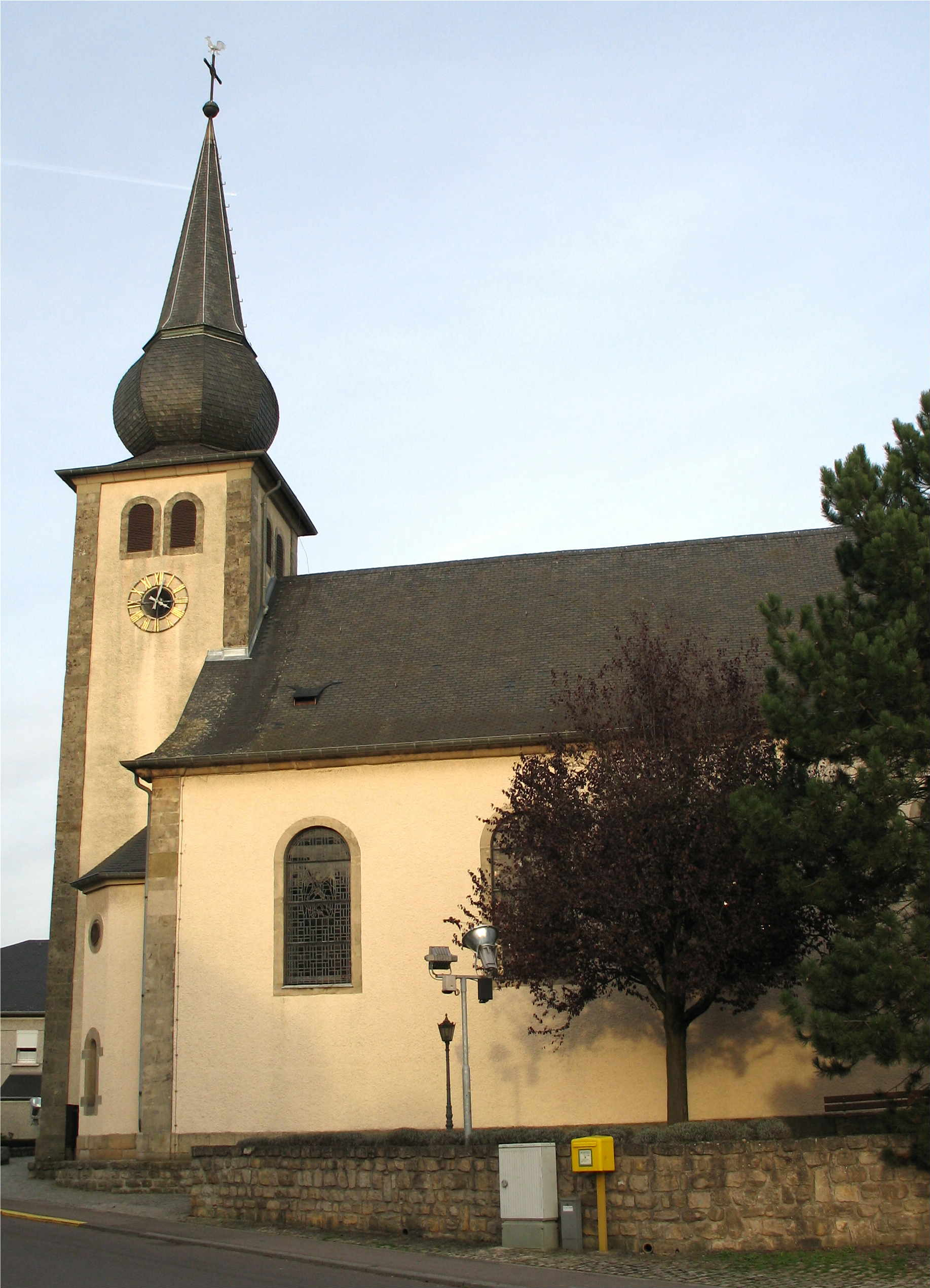
The church

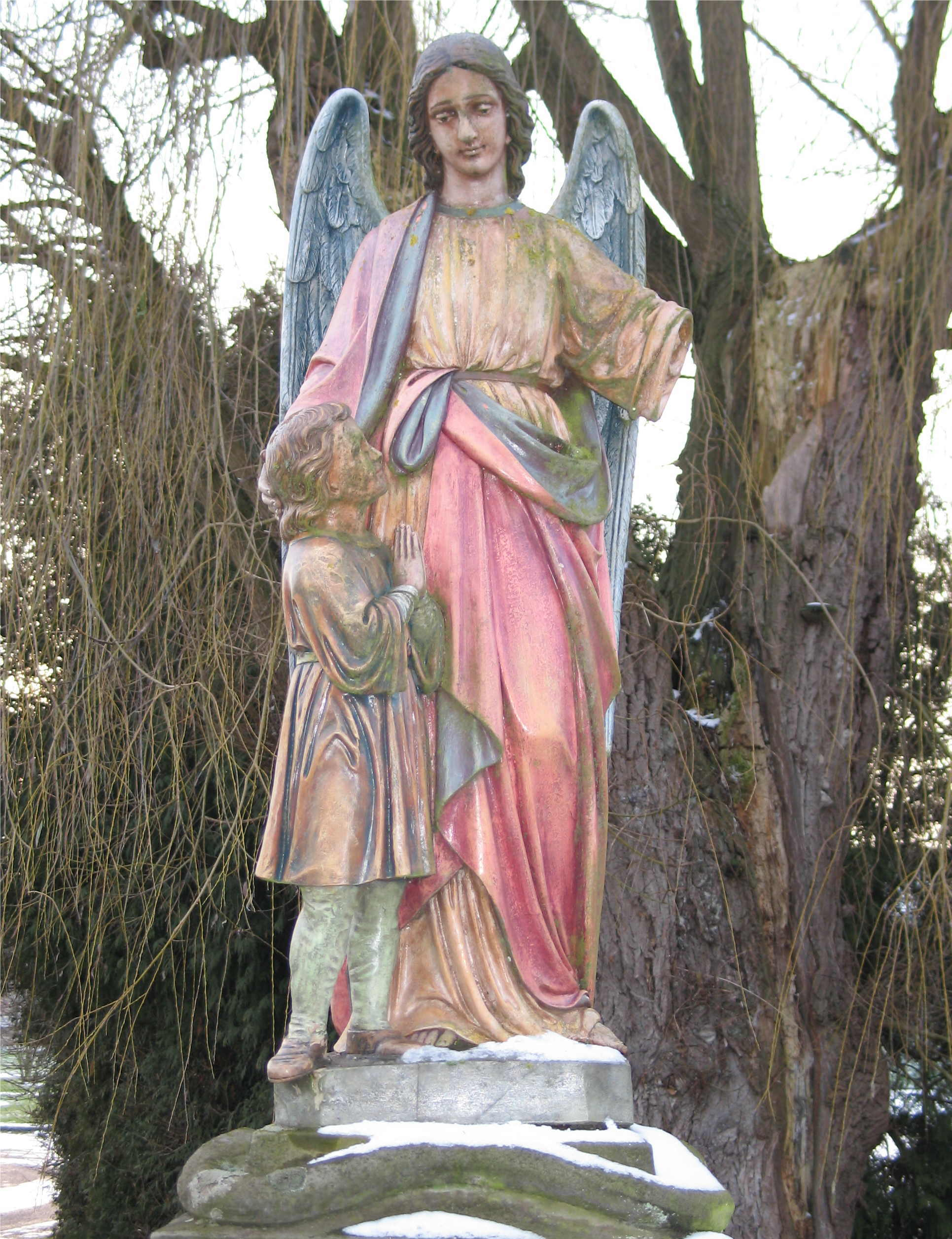
A statue of a guardian angel alongside the street to Remich.

Moutfort (Luxembourgish: Mutfert, German: Mutfort) is a village in the commune of Contern, in south-eastern Luxembourg, on both sides of the road from the city of Luxembourg to the German border. As of September 2026, the village of Moutfort had a population of 1,635 inhabitants, and the associated village of Medingen had 127 inhabitants.

It is usual to speak four or five languages in daily life, even for many children.The Places where it’s commonly found for this Experience are Maison de jeunes Moutfort, the Soccer club “US Moutfort-Medingen”, and in Summer the “Kultur Summer”.

Moutfort is situated in the valley of the Syr, which flows into the Moselle at Wasserbillig.

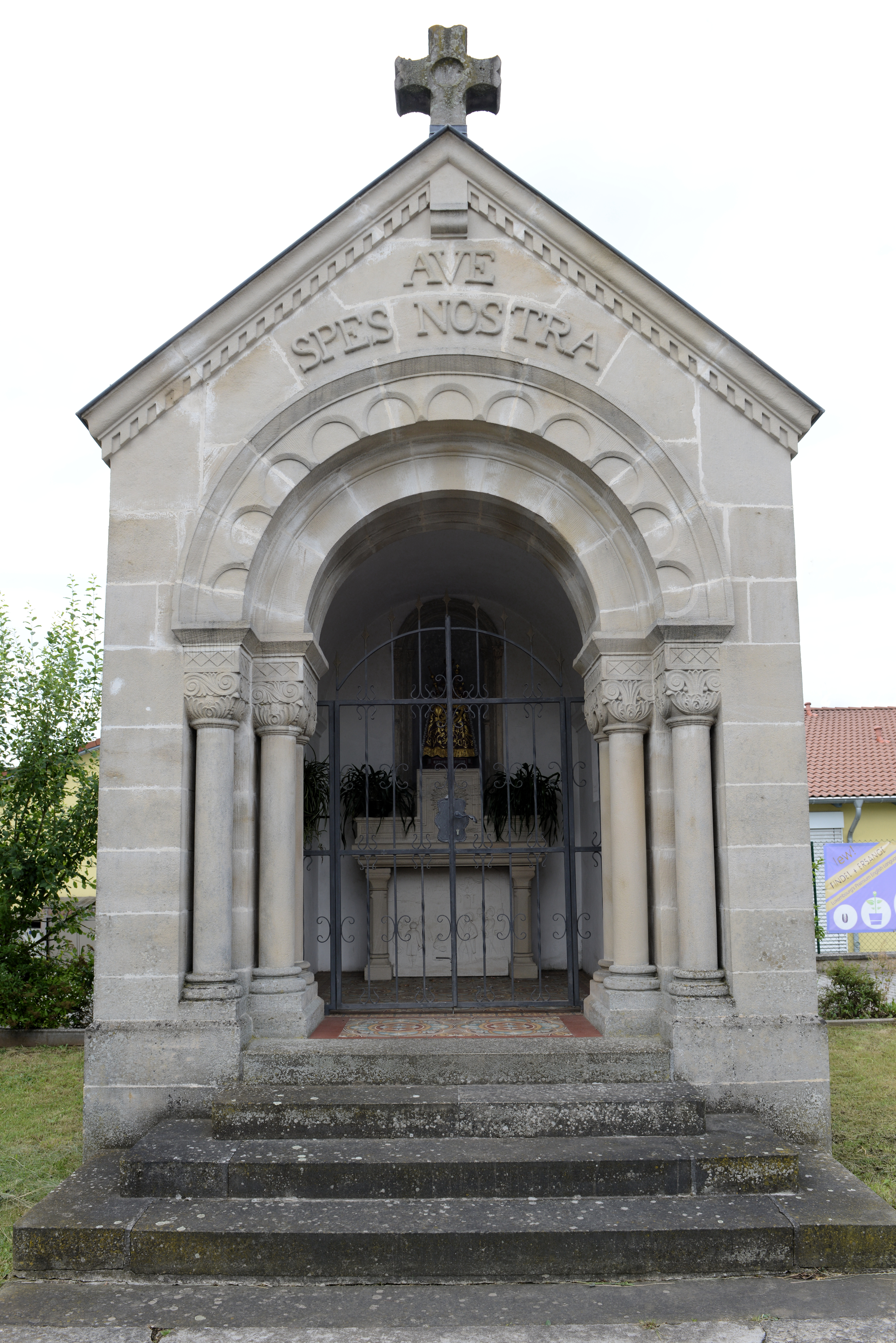
The chapel beside which stands the Guardian Angel

Moutfort and the commune of Contern, which also comprises the villages of Medingen and Oetrange, are rich in forests and agriculture.
