= Weiler-la-Tour =

Weiler-la-Tour Weiler zum Tuer (Luxembourgish)
- Commune
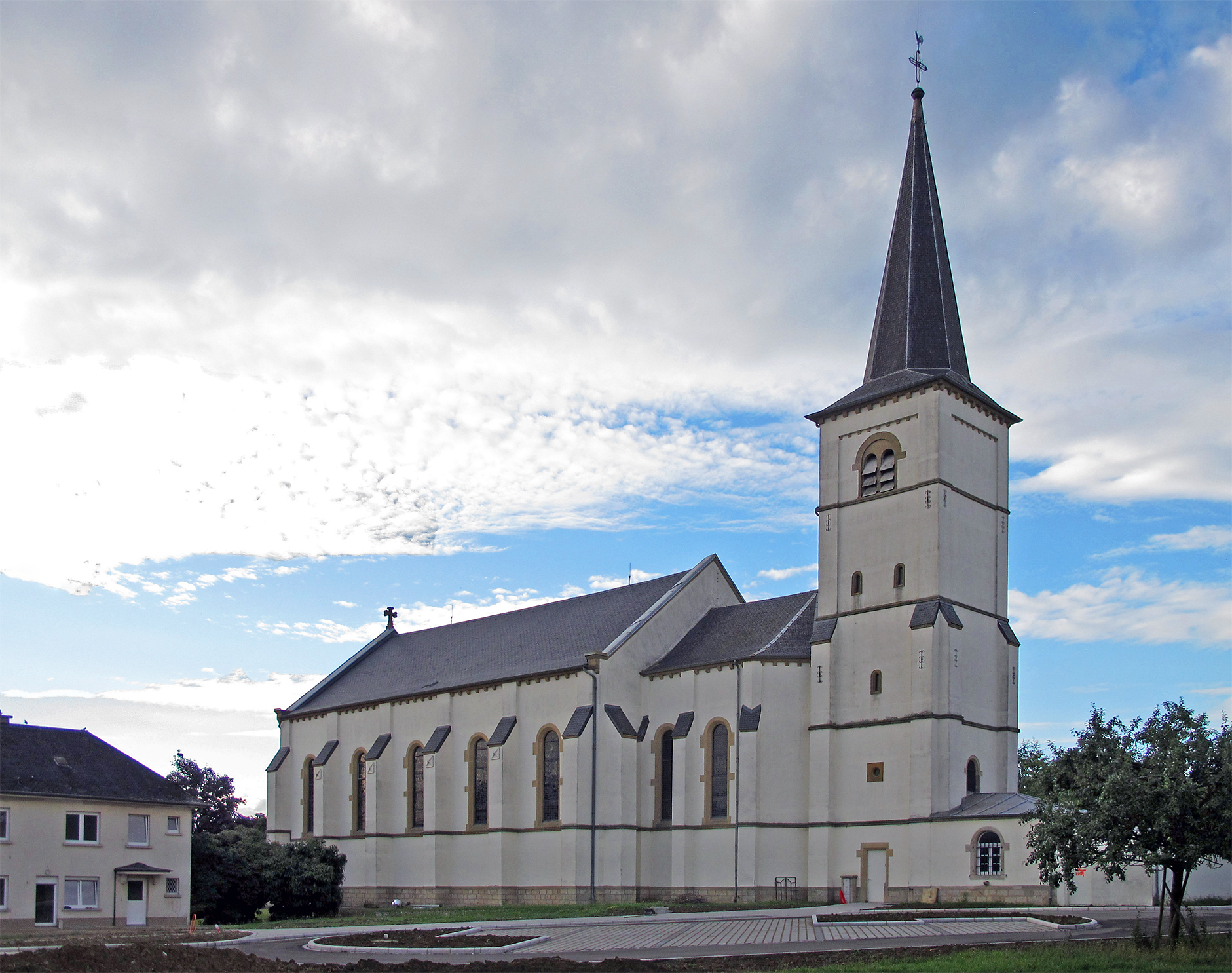
- Weiler-la-Tour church

- Coat of arms

- Map of Luxembourg with Weiler-la-Tour highlighted in orange, and the canton in dark red
- Coordinates: 49.5425°N 6.1997°E
- Country: Luxembourg
- Canton: Luxembourg

Government
  - Mayor: Vincent Reding (CSV)

Area
  - Total: 17.07 km^{2} (6.59 sq mi)
  - Rank: 69th of 100
- Highest elevation: 329 m (1,079 ft)
  - Rank: 92nd of 100
- Lowest elevation: 243 m (797 ft)
  - Rank: 53rd of 100

Population (2026)
  - Total: 2,517
  - Rank: 63rd of 100
  - Density: 147.5/km^{2} (381.9/sq mi)
  - Rank: 55th of 100
- Time zone: UTC+1 (CET)
  - Summer (DST): UTC+2 (CEST)
- LAU 2: LU0000311
- Website: weiler-la-tour.lu

Weiler-la-Tour (Luxembourgish: Weiler zum Tuer, German: Weiler zum Turm) is a commune and small town in southern Luxembourg. It is located south-east of Luxembourg City. The commune's administrative centre is Hassel.

As of September 2026, the town of Weiler-la-Tour, which lies in the south of the commune, has a population of 1,046. Other towns within the commune include Hassel and Syren.

== Population ==
Historical population

Year	Pop.	±%
1821	602	—
1851	955	+58.6%
1900	771	−19.3%
1910	717	−7.0%
1922	723	+0.8%
1935	660	−8.7%

Year	Pop.	±%
1947	611	−7.4%
1960	594	−2.8%
1970	634	+6.7%
1981	898	+41.6%
1990	1,061	+18.2%
2000	1,353	+27.5%

Year	Pop.	±%
2005	1,367	+1.0%
2010	1,841	+34.7%
2015	2,178	+18.3%
2020	2,404	+10.4%
2021	2,456	+2.2%

Source data
