= Syren, Luxembourg =

Town in the commune of Weiler-la-Tour in southern Luxembourg

Coordinates: 49°34′N 6°13′E

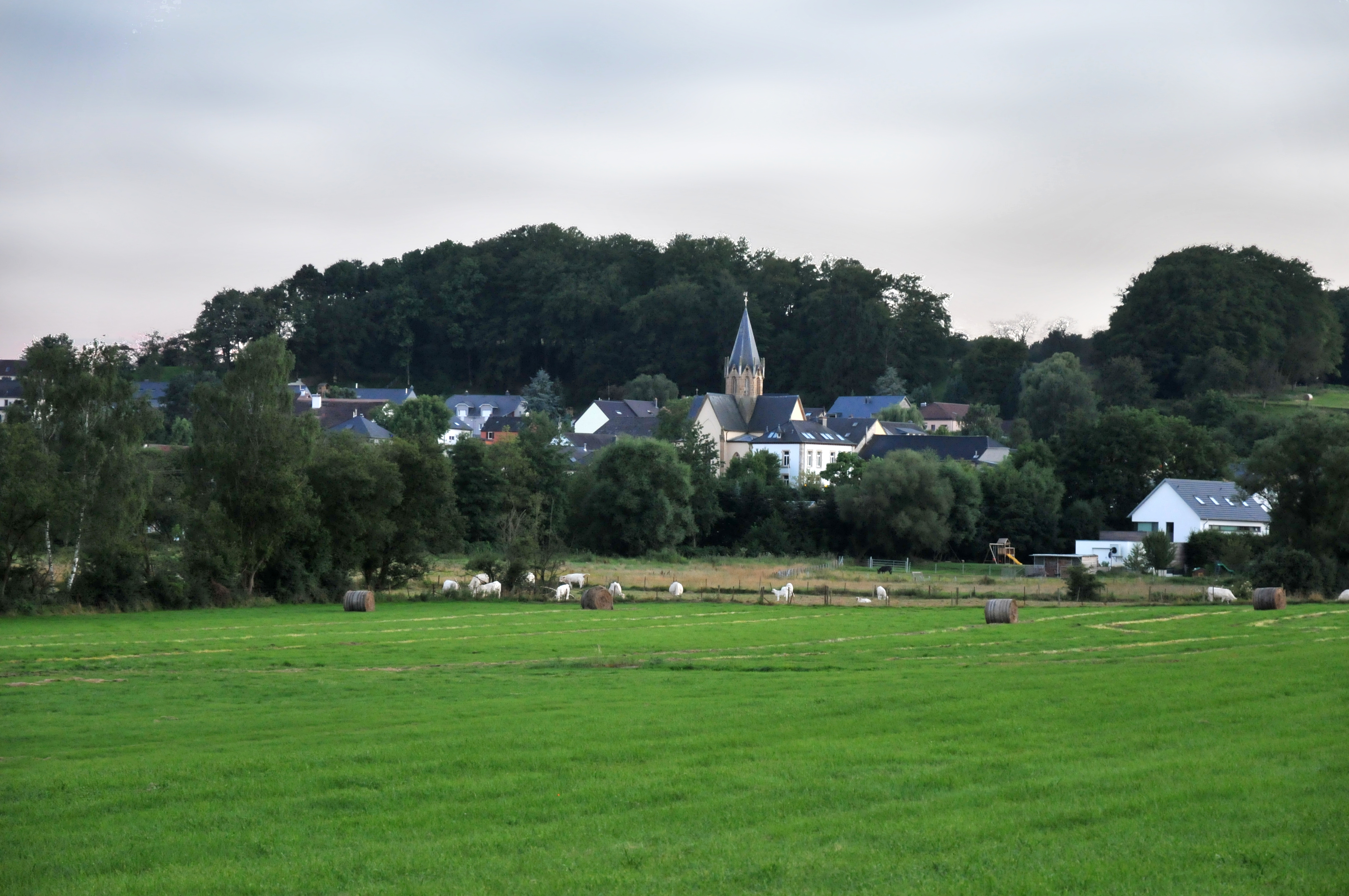
Syren village

Syren (Luxembourgish: Siren) is a small town in the commune of Weiler-la-Tour, in southern Luxembourg. As of September 2026, the town had a population of 725 people.

Syren is the source of the Syre river, which flows down to the Moselle, through some of Luxembourg's wealthiest districts.

In 2003, there was a fire which destroyed 4 homes. A similar fire happened in the summer of 2014, destroying one chalet.
