= Syre (river) =

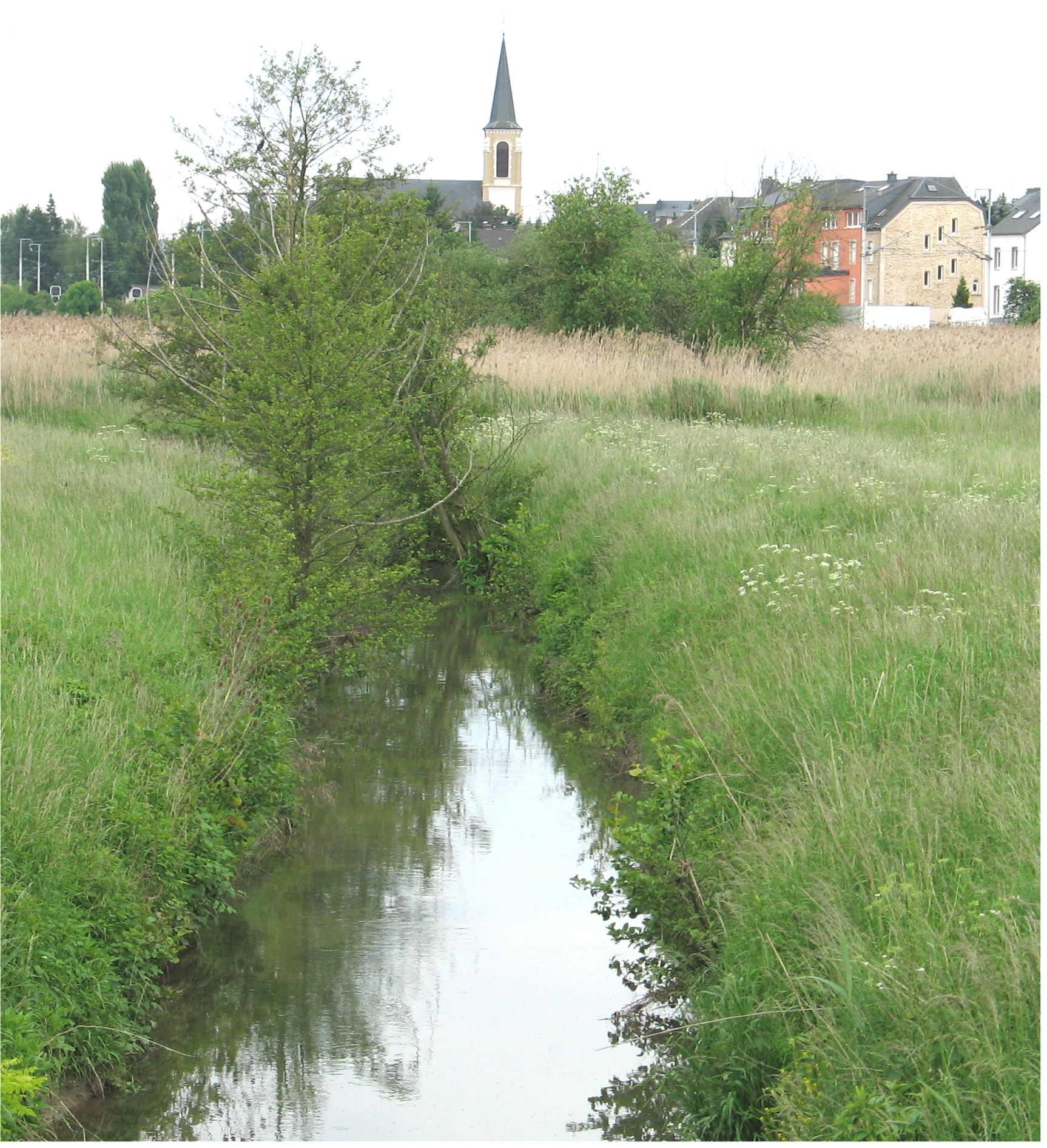
- Syre near Schuttrange

Location
- Country: Luxembourg

Physical characteristics
- Source
  - location: Syren
  - elevation: 283 m (928 ft)
- Mouth: Moselle
  - coordinates: 49°41′55″N 6°28′52″E
- Length: 30 km (19 mi)
- Basin size: 193 km^{2} (75 sq mi)

Basin features
- Progression: Moselle→ Rhine→ North Sea

The Syre or Syr (Luxembourgish: Sir) is a river flowing through Luxembourg, joining the Moselle in Mertert. It flows through Schuttrange, Roodt-sur-Syre, Betzdorf and Manternach.
