= Orthodox Archdiocese of Belgium and exarchate of the Netherlands and Luxembourg =

Orthodox church in the Benelux

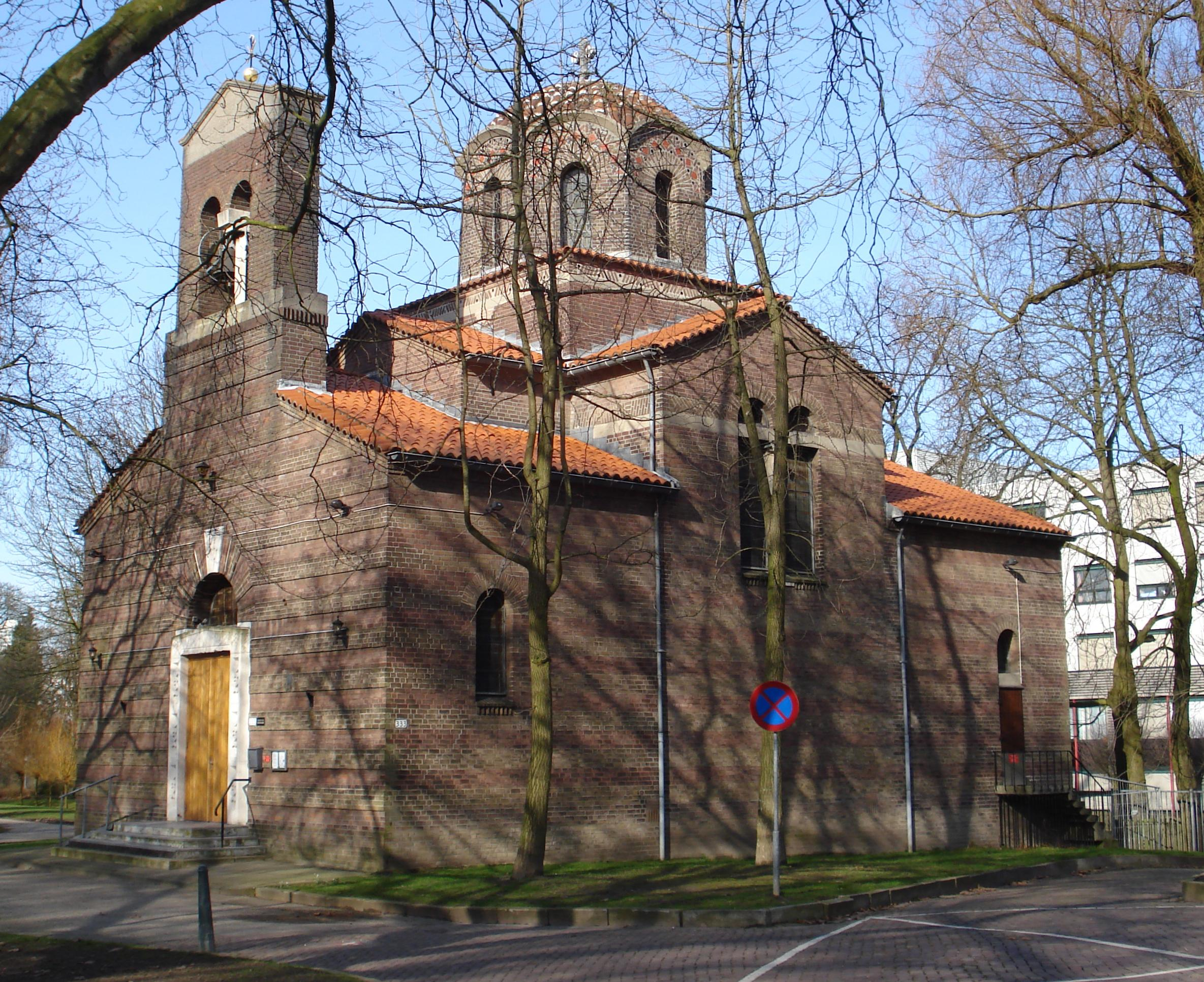

The Archdiocese of Belgium and exarchate of the Netherlands and Luxembourg is a jurisdiction of the Ecumenical Patriarchate of Constantinople, covering the Low Countries.

In 2023, it is led by Metropolitan Athenagoras (Peckstadt) of Belgium.

== Description ==
The archdiocese was established in 1969 by a decree of the Holy Synod of the Ecumenical Patriarchate of Constantinople. The archdiocese is headed by an archbishop, whose title is Metropolitan of Belgium and Exarch of the Netherlands and Luxembourg.

The archdiocese counts 41 parishes: 31 in Belgium, 8 in The Netherlands and 2 in Luxembourg. A small monastery in Asten also belongs to the archdiocese. Liturgy is celebrated in Greek in the majority of parishes, but there are others with services in Dutch, French, German, Polish, and Arabic.

== History ==
A permanent Orthodox presence in the Low Countries dates back to the mid-18th century. At the initiative of Greek merchants, a small parish was established in Amsterdam under the protection of Catherine of Alexandria. In 1760, Greek merchants arranged for the liturgy of Saint John Chrysostom to be translated into Dutch, and 1000 copies were printed and distributed.

In 1900, a second parish was established in Antwerp for the population of Greek traders and sailors. The parish was dedicated to the Annunciation of the Mother of God and—as all Greek spoken parishes of the diaspora—was under the jurisdiction of the Ecumenical Patriarchate.

An Orthodox parish was established in Brussels in 1926. In the mid-1950s, nearly 30,000 Greeks came to Belgium to work as guest workers. To meet their spiritual and pastoral needs, the ecumenical patriarch Athenagoras sent four young priests to Belgium. New parishes were established in Liège, the Borinage and Belgian Limburg.

The need for an Orthodox presence in the language of the country gradually became apparent. Consequently, numerous Orthodox natives established Orthodox parishes in several cities of the Benelux. Celebrations were not held in Greek, Slavic or Romanian, but in Dutch or French. An example is the first Dutch-speaking Orthodox parish that was founded in Ghent in 1972, on the initiative of Ignace Peckstadt, and dedicated to the Apostle Saint Andrew, patron of the Church of Constantinople. The church was housed in an old building of the former Elisabeth Beguine Convent. The initiator was ordained a deacon and a little later a priest. Other parishes were founded, where liturgy is celebrated mainly in the local language, in Bruges, Kortrijk, Ostend, Hasselt, Eindhoven, The Hague, Tilburg, Eupen, Brussels and Tournai.

== Metropolitans ==
When the Orthodox archdiocese was founded in 1969, Mgr. Emilianos Zacharopoulos, then metropolitan of Selevkia, was elected its first metropolitan. His enthronement took place the same year on November 11 in the Orthodox cathedral of the Holy Archangels in the Stalingradlaan in Brussels. The archdiocese then had 13 parishes.

On December 22, 1982, Mgr. Emilianos was elected Metropolitan of Kos in Greece and was succeeded as a Belgian Metropolitan by his auxiliary bishop, Mgr. Panteleimon Kontogiannis. In 2013 Mgr. Panteleimon resigned for health reasons.

Auxiliary bishop Athenagoras Peckstadt was unanimously elected as his successor, metropolitan of Belgium and exarch of the Netherlands and Luxembourg. It was the first time that the synod of the ecumenical patriarchate elected a non-Greek as a diocesan metropolitan. Athenagoras Peckstadt is thus heading the Orthodox church in Belgium, the Netherlands and the Grand Duchy of Luxembourg. He is also chairman of the Orthodox bishops' conference of the Benelux.

== Official Recognitions ==
Since the foundation of the archdiocese, efforts were made towards official recognition of the Orthodox church by the Belgian state. Metropolitan Zacharopoulos started the efforts, that were continued by Panteleimon Kontogiannis. They were assisted in this by several lawyers, in particular the archpriests Marc Nicaise and Ignace Peckstadt and Dr. Antoine Van Bruaene. This led to the official confirmation as a recognized religion in 1985. The implementing decrees were signed in 1988. Amongst other things, it was stipulated that “The metropolitan archbishop of the ecumenical patriarchate of Constantinople is the representative body of the whole of the Orthodox church”

In the Grand Duchy of Luxembourg, the Orthodox church enjoyed initial recognition through the 1997 and 2004 agreements between Church and State. They were followed by official recognition, thanks to the signing of a convention on January 26, 2015. This convention recognizes four parishes: a Greek, a Russian, a Serbian and a Romanian. The metropolitan of Belgium and exarch of the Netherlands and Luxembourg of the Ecumenical Patriarchate of Constantinople represents the whole of the Orthodox Church.

Since the foundation in 2010 of the Orthodox bishops' conference of the Benelux, for the Netherlands the bishops have signed an agreement stipulating that “the metropolitan of the ecumenical patriarchate of Constantinople or his deputy will be the representative of the whole of the Orthodox church in the Netherlands ”. In 2013, articles of association, regulating the organization of this representation, were registered and an advisory board was set up to assist the representative. Currently the representative is the metropolitan of Belgium and exarch of the Netherlands.

== Literature ==
- Ignace PECKSTADT, De sterkte van Gods aanwezigheid. Wijsheid uit de orthodoxe spiritualiteit (The power of God's presence. Wisdom out if the Orthodox spirituality), Uitg. Averbode, 2001.
- Ignace PECKSTADT, Een open venster op de Orthodoxe Kerk (An open window upon the Orthodox church), Uitg. Averbode, 2005 & 2013.
- Athenagoras PECKSTADT, De Orthodoxe Kerk en de Belgische Overheid (The Orthodox church and the Belgian authorities), in: Levensbeschouwingen en de overhead in België – een toelichting door vertegenwoordigers van de erkende erediensten en de vrijzinnige niet-confessionele levensbeschouwing, Antwerpen, 2011.
- Athenagoras PECKSTADT, De Orthodoxe Kerk in België, haar geschiedenis en organisatie (The Belgian Orthodox church, its history and organization), in: Jaarboek van de Vereniging van Orthodoxen H. Nikolaas van Myra 2011, Amsterdam, 2011.
- Panagiotis YANNOPOULOS, Orthodox Jubileum van het Orthodox Aartsbisdom van België en Exarchaat van Nederland en Luxembourg (Orthodox jubilee), Brussels, Uitg. Orthobel, 2019.
- 50 jaar Orthodox Aartsbisdom van Benelux (50 years orthodoxie in the Benelux), Brussel, Uitg. Orthobel, Brusseld, 2019.

== See also ==
- Religion in Luxembourg
- Roman Catholic Archdiocese of Luxembourg
- Protestantism in Luxembourg
- Assembly of Canonical Orthodox Bishops of Belgium, Holland, and Luxembourg
- Greeks in Belgium
- Greeks in the Netherlands
- Greeks in Luxembourg
