= Protestantism in Luxembourg =

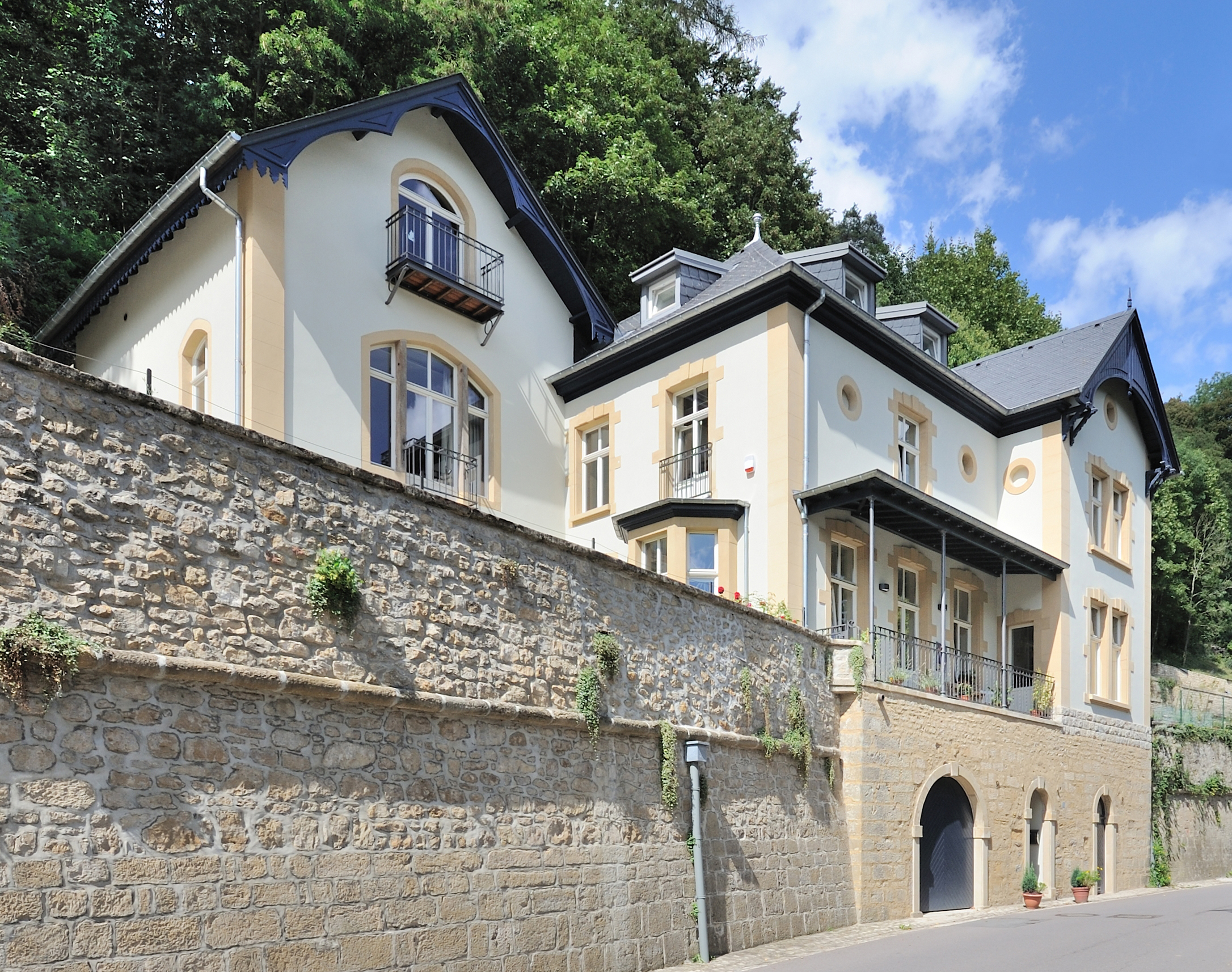
The Protestant Centre (Centre protestant) located at 1 rue Jules-Wiltheim in the Clausen quarter of Luxembourg City

The practice of Protestantism in Luxembourg is divided across several different churches and denominations. The largest Protestant churches in the Grand Duchy are the Protestant Church of Luxembourg, Church of England, and Protestant Church in the Netherlands. In 2022, Protestantism was the largest minority religion in Luxembourg (after the majority Roman Catholic Church), with an estimated 2% of the population.

== History ==
As a result of fierce opposition by Jesuit counter-Reformationists, Protestantism was outlawed in Luxembourg until 1768. By 1815, Luxembourg had small populations of Lutherans, Calvinists, and Waldensians. The Congress of Vienna changed the religious establishment; not only did Luxembourg pass to the Protestant House of Orange-Nassau, but it was also occupied by the armies of Protestant Prussia. The first permanent Protestant church was Luxembourg City's Baroque Trinity Church, which was appropriated by the Prussian garrison to hold their services. When the Prussian army left Luxembourg, the Trinity Church passed to the civilian population.

In 1885, about 0.5% of the inhabitants of Luxembourg were Protestant or 1,100 out of 213,000 inhabitants. By 1914, there were more than 6,000, or approximately 2.3%.

Most of the nineteenth century saw little change in the religious composition of Luxembourg's population, with only a marginal increase in the number of Protestants. However, towards the end, tens of thousands of German immigrants, many of whom were Lutheran or Calvinist, moved to Luxembourg to work in the steel industry. Grand Duke Adolphe sought to both recognise the contribution of Protestants and to establish state authority over the new denominations. To these ends, he ordered the creation of a new church, the Protestant Church of Luxembourg (PKL), which would unite the Lutherans and Calvinists. Immediately, the new church became recognised by the state as an officially mandated religion, similar in status to the Roman Catholic Church.

Throughout the twentieth century, the growth of expatriates in Luxembourg caused a surge in number of further Protestant churches. New churches include Lutheran churches from the Netherlands, Denmark, and Sweden, Anglican and Presbyterian churches from the United Kingdom, and Evangelical churches from the United States. In 2003, the Church of England unsuccessfully applied to be given the same officially mandated status as the PKL and the PRKL.

== 21st century ==
In 2022, the government had formal conventions with six religious groups. The Anglican Church was recognised as one group and another group was made up of the Reformed Protestant Church of Luxembourg and the Protestant Church of Luxembourg. Recognition means eligibility for financial support from the government.

== See also ==
- Religion in Luxembourg
- Roman Catholic Archdiocese of Luxembourg
- Orthodox Archdiocese of Belgium and exarchate of the Netherlands and Luxembourg
