= Taina Bofferding =

Luxembourgish politician

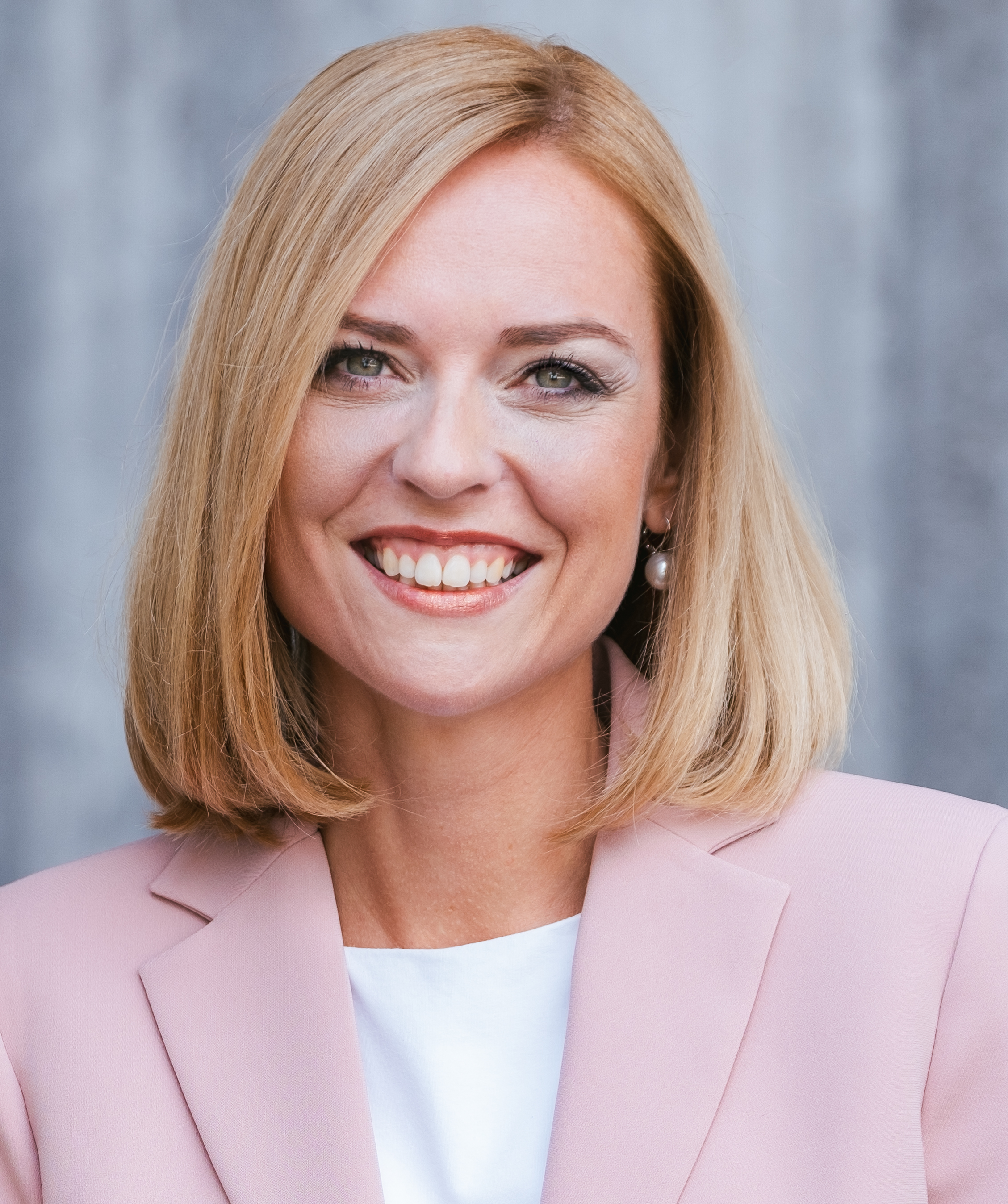

Taina Bofferding (born 22 November 1982) is a Luxembourgish politician who served as the Minister of the Interior and of Equality between Men and Women under the Government of Xavier Bettel from 2018 to 2023. She was replaced by Léon Gloden as the new Minister of Internal Affairs in 2023.

== Early life ==
After high school at Hubert-Clément High School in Esch-sur-Alzette, her hometown, she first studied as an educator at the Luxembourg Institute of Educational and Social Studies (IEES), from which she graduated in 2005, then studied in social sciences at the University of Trier which gives her the title of Master in Social Sciences in 2011.

== Political career ==
A member of the Luxembourg Socialist Workers Party (LSAP) since 2004, she was vice-president of the Alliance of Humanists and Atheists (AHA) from 2010 to 2018, which seeks to separate the socio-political and religious domains more radically. Until 207, she was also trade union secretary for the Independent Luxembourg Trade Union Confederation (OGB-L).

Since 5 December 2013 until 30 October 2018 she was member of the Chamber of Deputies. She stood for the reelection in the 2018 Luxembourg general election but just missed getting a direct mandate. She was also member of the city council of Esch-sur-Alzette between 2013 and 2018.

From 2018 to 2023 she was Minister of the Interior and of Equality between Men and Women. In 2018, she helped reform emergency services with the creation of the Grand Ducal Fire and Rescue Corps (CGDIS), and stated that her main goals for 2019 were to reinstall a committee for the reform of property tax and reform municipal law. As Minister of Equality, she was particularly vocal in supporting companies that strengthened the approach to equality and promoted women's career advancements.
