= Greeks in Belgium =

Part of the demographics of Belgium

The Greek community in Belgium numbers around 25,000 to 35,000 people.

== History ==
Although Greeks were already living in Belgium before 1956, most migration from Greece to Belgium happened between 1956 and 1964. An estimated 20,000 Greeks were then attracted as guest workers for the mining industry. They ended up mainly in the city of Mons or the mining region in the province of Limburg. Gradually, they also migrated to Brussels, where, among other things, a Greek community settled around Brussels-North railway station.

Since the 2008 financial crisis, which hit Greece hard on the socio-economic front, an increasing number of Greeks started migrating for work to Belgium.

== Notable people ==
- Iosif Poursanidis Composer-musician, Founder of the Hellenic Community Turnhout-Kempen
- fr:Jean Daskalidès, chocolatier
- fr:Christos Doulkeridis, politician
- Leonidas Kestekides, chocolatier, founder of the Brussels-based Leonidas chocolate company
- Viktor Klonaridis, football player
- Charly Konstantinidis, football player
- Thivaios brothers, DJ-s
- Katerine Avgoustakis, singer
- Daphne Patakia, actress
- Konstantinos Karetsas, football player

== See also ==
- Belgium–Greece relations
- Greek diaspora
- Greek people
- Immigration to Belgium
- Greeks in France
- Greeks in Germany
- Greeks in the Netherlands
