= Evangelical Church in Hessen and Nassau =

German church body

- Abbreviation: EKHN
- Type: Regional Church, member of the Evangelical Church in Germany
- Classification: Protestant
- Orientation: United Protestant (Lutheran & Reformed)
- Director: Kirchenpräsident Christiane Tietz
- Associations: Union Evangelischer Kirchen, Reformed Alliance
- Region: 13.358,77 km² in southern Hesse, parts of Rhineland-Palatinate (Germany)
- Headquarters: Darmstadt
- Origin: 1933
- Merger of: Evangelical Churches of Hesse, Nassau and Frankfurt
- Members: 1,219,797 (2025); 22,9% of total population
- Other names: Protestant Church of Hesse and Nassau
- Official website: www.ekhn.de

The Evangelical Church in Hessen and Nassau (German: Evangelische Kirche in Hessen und Nassau, EKHN) is a United Protestant church body in the German states of Hesse and Rhineland-Palatinate. According to the Protestant Church in Germany its English name is the Protestant Church of Hesse and Nassau. There is no bishop and therefore no cathedral. One of its most prominent churches is Katharinenkirche in Frankfurt am Main.

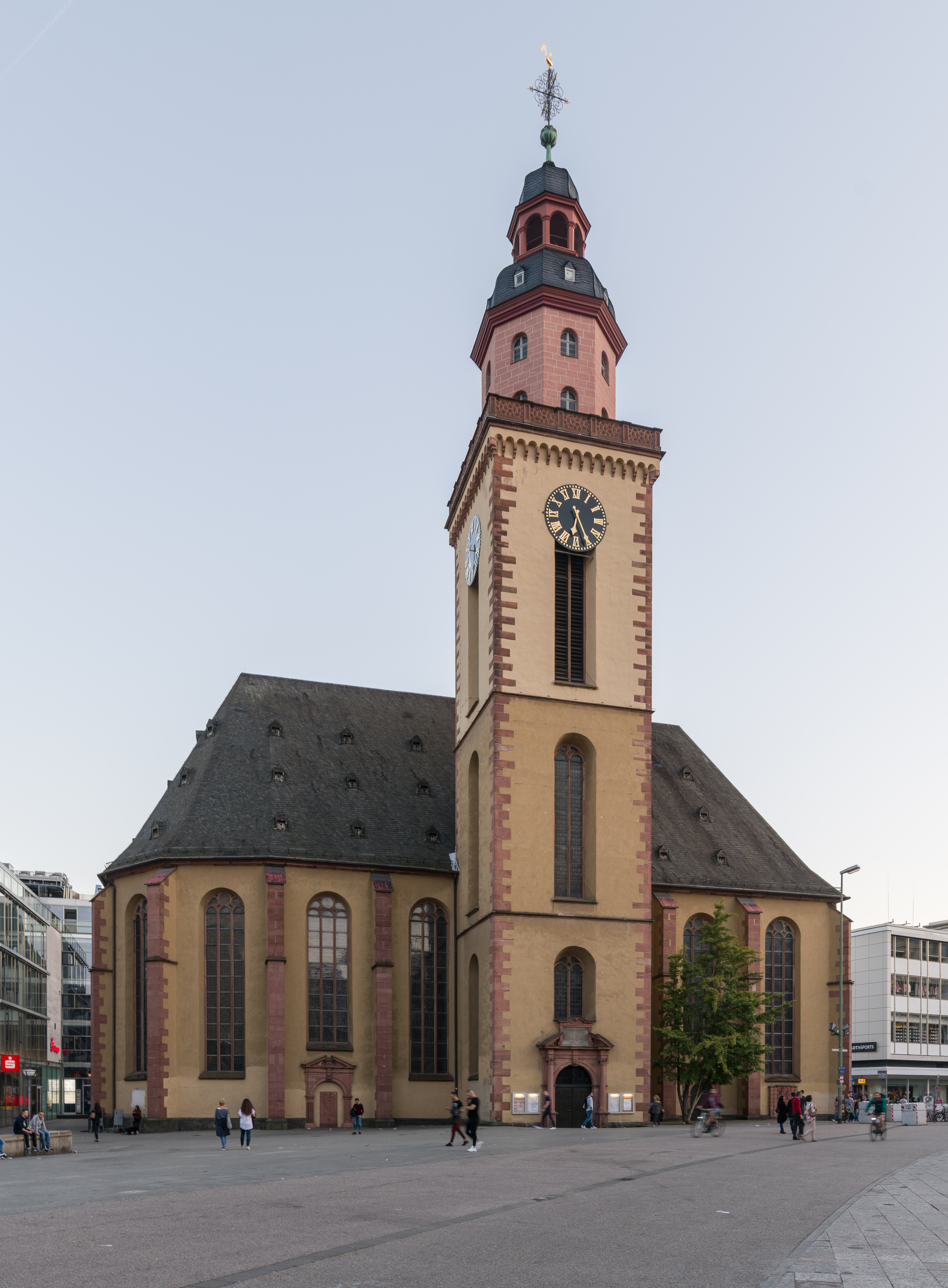
St. Catherine's Church, Frankfurt

Dating back to the union in the Duchy of Nassau in August 1817, before the Prussian Union of September 1817, it is the first United and uniting church in the world. The EKHN is a full member of the Evangelical Church in Germany (EKD), and is based on the teachings brought forward by Martin Luther during the Reformation. The Church President is Christiane Tietz. She succeeded Volker Jung (2009-2025). It is a united church, combining both Calvinist and Lutheran traditions. Member of the Reformed Alliance in Germany. The Evangelical Church in Hesse and Nassau is one of 20 churches in the EKD, has 1,219,797 members in 1,070 parishes (December, 2025). The territory of the EKHN includes the territories of the former People's State of Hesse and the Prussian Wiesbaden Region, which now form the southern and western part of the German state of Hesse and portions of the German state of Rhineland-Palatinate (Rhenish Hesse). It's the most important Protestant denomination in this area. The church is a member of the Communion of Protestant Churches in Europe.

== Management and Administration ==
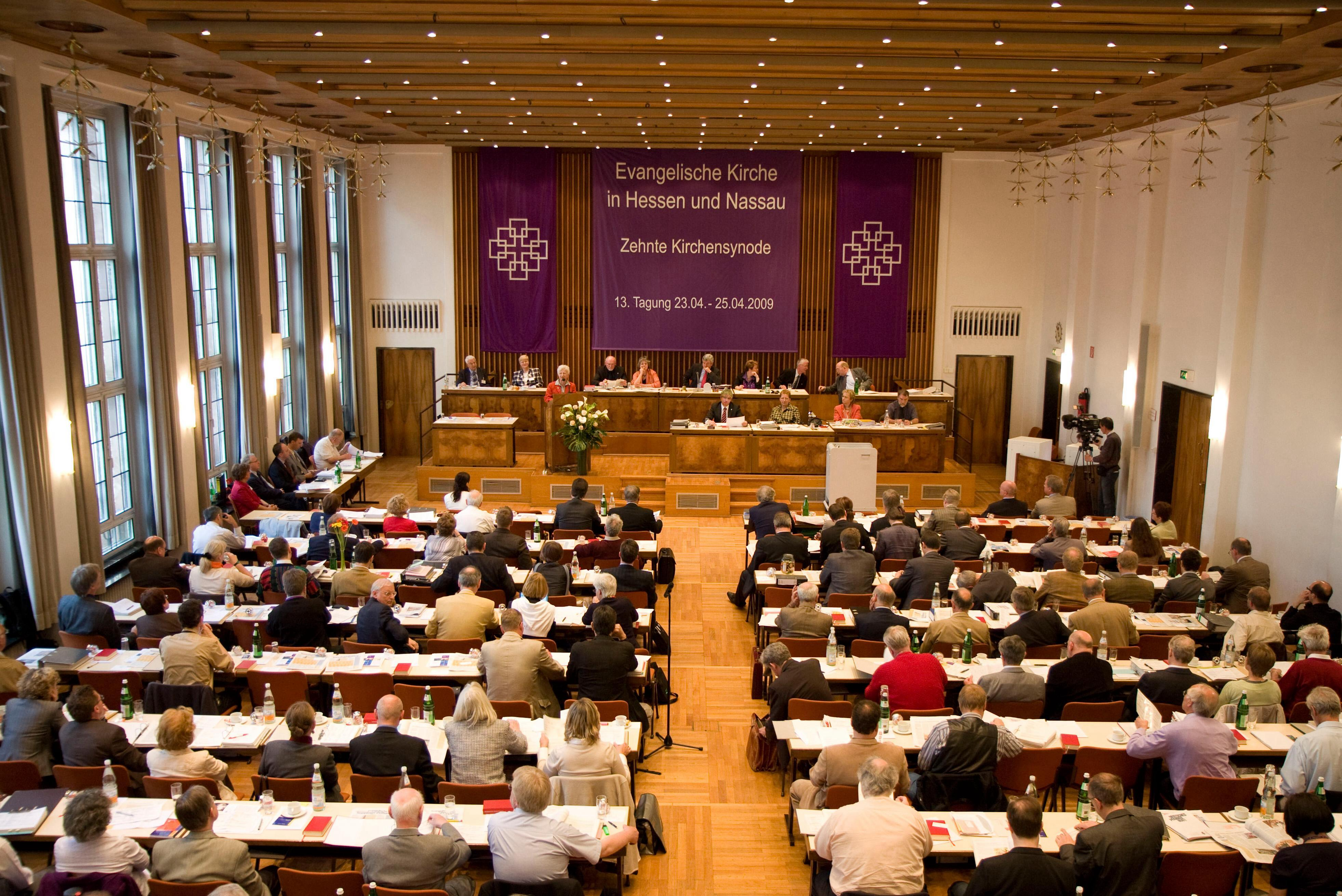
General synod (2009)

Institutions of the EKHN are the Church Synod, the church leadership and the church president, who is elected by the General Synod for eight years.

=== Church Presidents ===
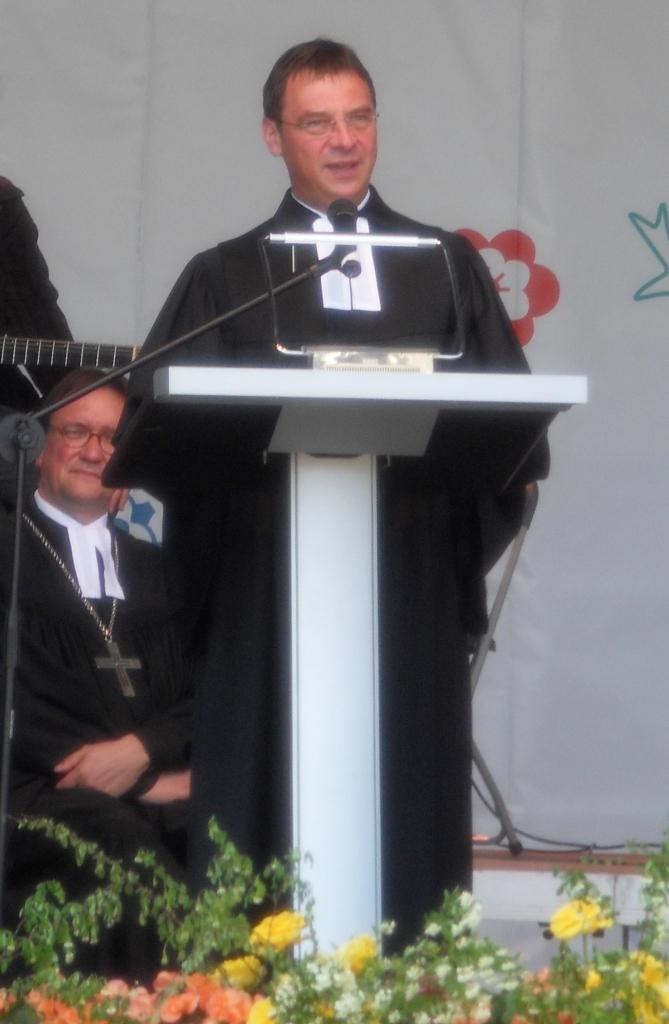
Volker Jung, president from 2009

- 1947–1964: Martin Niemöller
- 1964–1968: Wolfgang Sucker
- 1969–1985: Helmut Hild
- 1985–1992: Helmut Spengler
- 1993–2008: Peter Steinacker
- 2009–2025: Volker Jung
- since 2025: Christiane Tietz

== History ==
The Evangelical Church of Hesse and Nassau was founded in 1946 and 1947 through a merger of three other formerly independent churches: Evangelical Church in Hesse, Evangelical Church in Nassau, Protestant Church in Frankfurt.

== Academy ==
The church ran an Evangelical Academy in Arnoldshain, which was moved to Frankfurt in 2013.

== Practices ==
Ordination of women and blessing of same-sex marriages were allowed in 2013.
