= Léon Gloden =

Luxembourgish politician (born 1972)

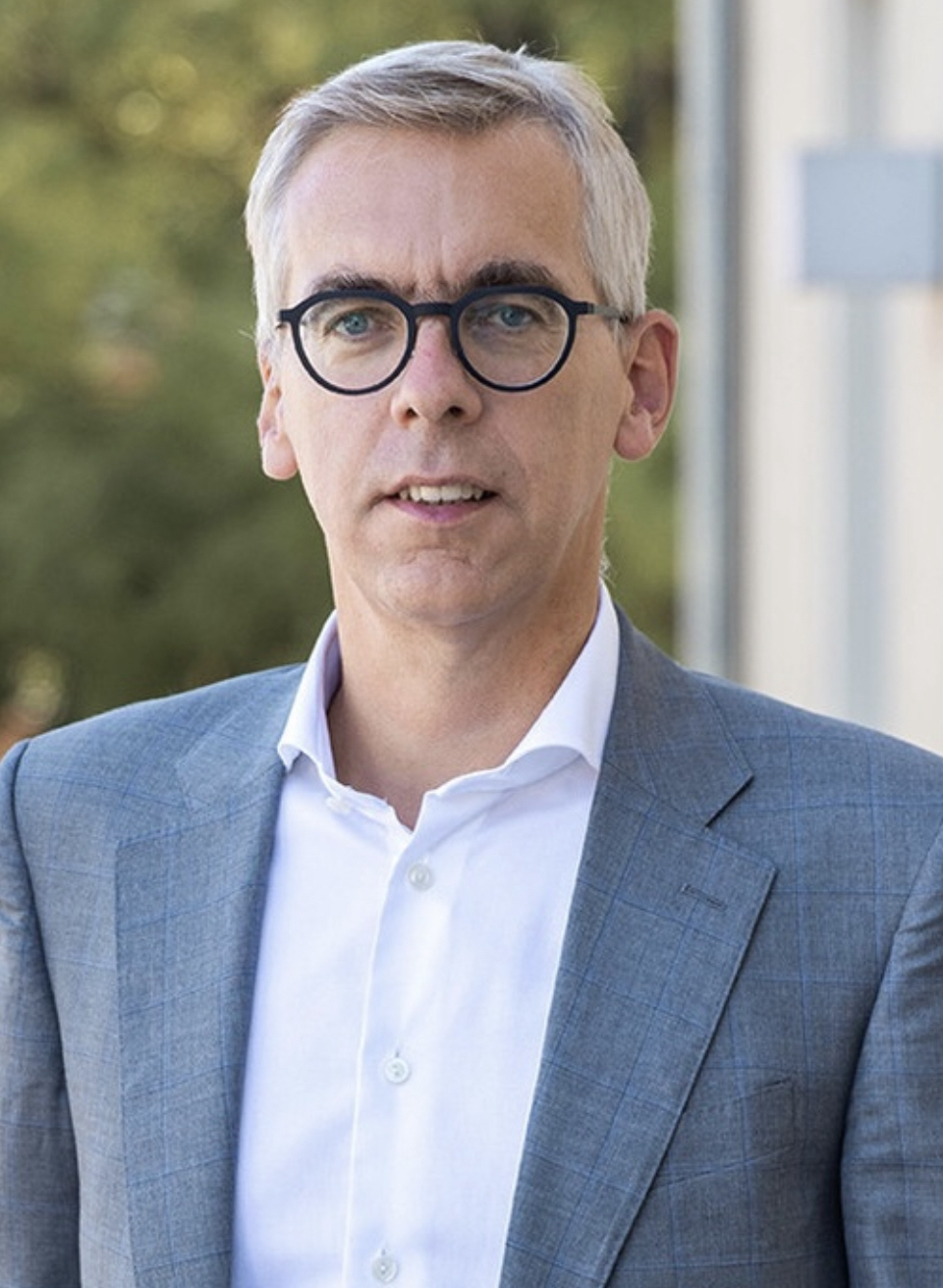
- Gloden in 2023

Minister for the Interior of Luxembourg
- Incumbent
- Assumed office 17 November 2023
- Prime Minister: Luc Frieden
- Preceded by: Taina Bofferding

Mayor of Grevenmacher
- In office 7 November 2011 – 17 November 2023
- Preceded by: Roby Stahl
- Succeeded by: Monique Hermes

Member of the Chamber of Deputies
- In office 28 July 2009 – 17 November 2023
- Preceded by: Françoise Hetto-Gaasch
- Succeeded by: Stéphanie Weydert
- Constituency: East

Personal details
- Born: Léon Marie Joseph Gloden; 9 December 1972 (age 53) Ettelbruck, Luxembourg
- Party: Christian Social People's Party

Léon Marie Joseph Gloden (born 9 December 1972) is a Luxembourgish politician and lawyer who serves as Minister for Home Affairs since 2023. A member of the Christian Social People's Party, he was previously mayor of Grevenmacher and a member of the Chamber of Deputies from 2009 to 2023.

== Early life, education and professional career ==
Gloden was born on 9 December 1972 in Ettelbruck to Marie-Berthe Olinger, a radiology nurse, and Joseph Gloden, a doctor of law, and grew up in Echternach. His father, a notary, was a member of the CSV, but resigned, because he did not get a place on the electoral list.. In his youth, Gloden was not very interested in politics. After obtaining his high school diploma, he studied at Aix-Marseille University, where he obtained a master's degree in European and international law at the Faculty of Law and Political Science. He got further degrees from University College London and the College of Europe in Bruges. He also completed an internship at the European Court of Justice with Advocate General Jean Mischo.

In 1999, Gloden started working at law firm Elvinger Hoss Prussen (EHP). He first practised labour law, later competition and real estate law. Considered a reference lawyer for medium-sized companies in Luxembourg, Gloden was promoted to partner at EHP in 2007.

== Political career ==
Gloden held multiple political offices in his career, starting in local politics in his home town of Grevenmacher, being a member in the Chamber of Deputies and since 2023, Minister of Home Affairs.

=== Communal politics ===
Gloden entered politics in 1999. He was recruited into the CSV and to take part in the communal elections in Grevenmacher by his neighbor Norbert Konter, the outgoing mayor at the time. However, the CSV lost 10 percentage points and the two other parties that ran in the election, LSAP and DP, formed a coalition. Gloden began his political career as a communal councilor in the opposition. In the 2005 communal elections, Gloden received 875 votes and was second most voted candidate on the CSV list. The CSV got 29,65 percent of the vote, behind the DP, which received 36,82 percent. The DP and LSAP maintained their coalition, and Gloden remained in the opposition.

==== First term as Mayor of Grevenmacher (2011-2017) ====
In 2011, Gloden campaigned on several issues in the communal elections: he wanted to extend the existing cultural center instead of building a new one, to create more parking space for cars, to create new medical facilities in the region and to build additional touristic infrastructure, including a youth hostel and a roof over Grevenmacher's open-air swimming pool. was able to benefit from his increased visibility as a member of the Chamber of Deputies, and was the most-voted candidate in Grevenmacher. The CSV came first in the commune with 36,96 percent, whereupon Gloden became mayor, forming a coalition with The Greens. In his inaugural speech, he emphasized that he wanted to pursue a policy based on the principle of sustainability. He brought particular attention to two infrastructure projects: the construction of an underground car park and the renovation of the tennis club.

From 2012 on, the planned extension of a depot for national fuel reserves in the port of Mertert, which lies between Mertert and Grevenmacher, was an issue where Gloden was in strong opposition to the national governments, both the CSV-led Juncker–Asselborn II Government and later the Bettel I Government. During the 2011 election campaign, he already made his opposition to the project clear, a position he shared with the former local government. He stated his intent to decline a building permit for the project. In 2015, he restated his opposition against the project and claimed the volume of traffic would be too high. On 7 March 2018, Gloden held a speech at a demonstration against the extension of the fuel depot, where citizen of Grevenmacher, Mertert and the German communes Temmels and Konz participated. In his speech, Gloden said the statements made by the company representatives were not credible and the municipal representatives, who sat on the supervisory board of the company in question without voting rights, had not approved the expansion. He thus contradicted a statement by the then Minister of Economic Affairs, Etienne Schneider. Another point of criticism voiced by Gloden was the fact that the existing tanks were not state of the art. In addition, Gloden said that he and no future mayor of Grevenmacher would ever issue a building permit. In Gloden's view, the danger posed by a potential fire is too high. He also said that the Luxembourg fire brigade was not trained well enough to deal with such fires. In September 2017, Grevenmacher announced, together with Temmels, a possible litigation against the project. Gloden stated that the project was not about the national reserves, but only about the interests of a private commercial enterprise.

==== Second term as Mayor of Grevenmacher (2017-2023) ====
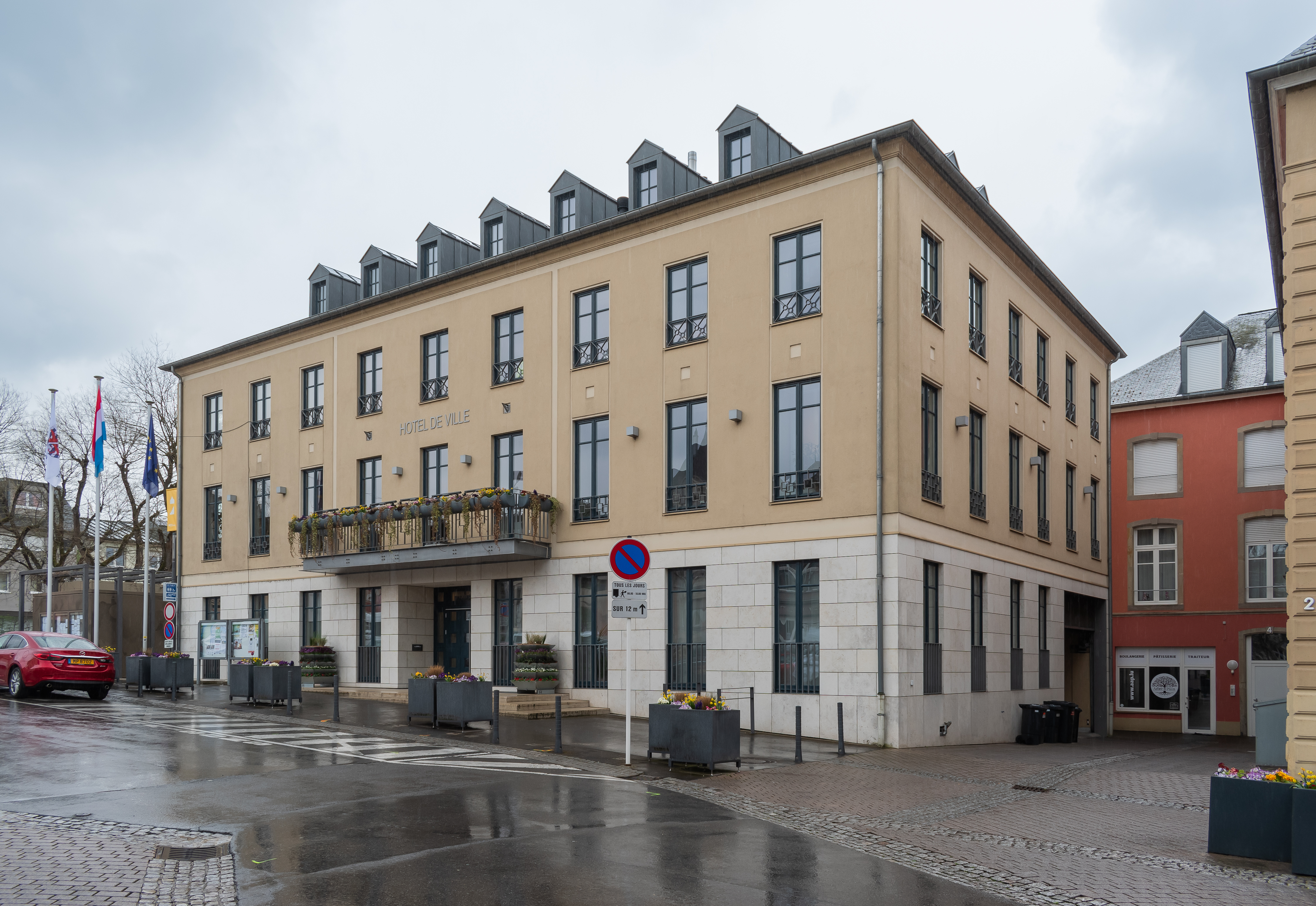
Gloden served as Mayor of Grevenmacher (town hall pictured) from 2011 to 2023.

For the next communal elections in 2017, Gloden was again the CSV's lead candidate in Grevenmacher. The party received 42,08 percent of the vote and gained one seat. Gloden was again the most-voted candidate, with 1,566 votes. The CSV-Greens coalition was renewed, and he became mayor for another term. In February 2018, Gloden was criticized by the opposition because Grevenmacher had amassed a high debt of €34.6 Million. He answered that the per capita debt would shrink in the coming years because the commune was expecting an increase in population and that some of the debt had been amassed by his predecessors.

Gloden launched the idea of what he called "a financial center" in Grevenmacher: a co-working space for workers coming from nearby Germany, so they would not have to travel all the way to Luxembourg City. Construction should begin in 2019. However, when Gloden restated these plans in 2019, only a partial land-use plan was conceived and voted, but no building had been realised.

The building of a new cultural center – one of Gloden's election issues since 2011 – was formally decided with a vote in the municipal council in 2019. Instead of renovating the old cultural center, as Gloden had suggested in the 2011 campaign, a completely new building was planned, with calculated costs of 25 million Euro. In 2021, another 4,5 million Euro were dedicated to enlarge the underlying parking space and in February 2023, the municipal council approved additional costs of 13,1 million Euro. The opposition criticized the high costs, fearing they would still rise.

This new cultural center was one of the topic Gloden campaigned on in 2023, with other topics being the general improvement of infrastructure, the expansion of childcare places and the creation of housing at affordable prices. Another issue was the opening of a medial imaging centre, which did not have an authorization when it opened and became the focal point of a national debate about the decentralization of medical facilities. Gloden was a fervent supporter of the center. Gloden's CSV lost some percentage points in the elections but was still – by a wide margin – first with 38.94 percent. Gloden himself was best-elected candidate and got 1,659 votes, a better result than 2017. On the evening of the election, he stated he wanted to continue as mayor in a coalition with The Greens. Due to his result, Gloden was called one of ten "dominating" and "untouchable" local politicians by the newspaper Tageblatt.

On 7 July 2023, Gloden was sworn in for another term as mayor of Grevenmacher. On 17 November 2023, he became Minister of Home Affairs in the Frieden-Bettel government and had to resign as mayor. His successor was Monique Hermes, who happened to be his former elementary school teacher.

=== Chamber of Deputies ===
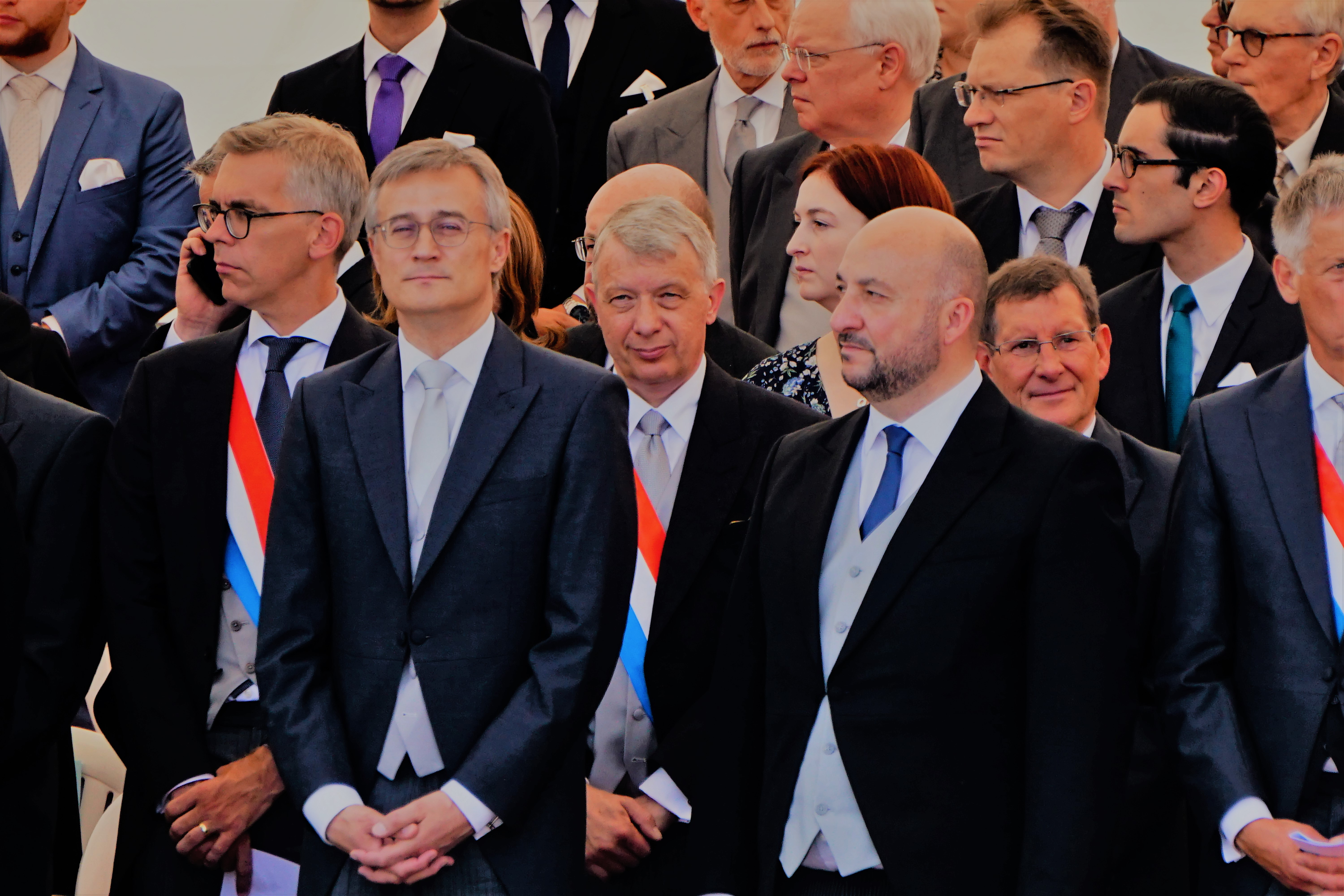
Gloden (on the left) as guest of honor during the national day military parade in 2019.

Gloden first tried to become a candidate for the general election in 2004. The CSJ east, the youth section of the CSV in the East constituency, and the local CSV chapter from Grevenmacher nominated him as candidate. However, the CSV Council of Elders did not consider him. Because no candidate from Grevenmacher was on the list of proposed candidates, around a quarter of the delegates at the district congress rejected the list.

Gloden was a candidate for the next general election 2009. The CSV won 4 out of 7 mandates in the East constituency, but he was second-last with 7 688 votes. Since two of the elected CSV candidates became members of the government, Gloden became a member of the Chamber of Deputies. As Gloden's CSV and the LSAP formed the Juncker-Asselborn II government, he was part of the ruling majority. In his first parliamentary term, Gloden was a member of the commissions on (internal) rules; the economy, foreign trade and the solidarity economy; public service and administrative simplification; institutions and constitutional reform; housing; and labour. From 18 November 2010 until the (premature) end of the legislative term, he was also President of the sub-commission "Creation of a European contract law for consumers and businesses" of the Legal Affairs Commission. From 2011 on, he was also member of the commission on legal affairs. He was the rapporteur for 19 legislative projects, although not all of them were realised. Most of these fell into the area of law and economics. Gloden also acted as rapporteur on a number of dossiers in the course of the constitutional reform.

Snap elections were held in 2013, in which Gloden stood again for the CSV in the East constituency. His party lost one seat in this district, but was the strongest force with three seats and 36.9%. Gloden won 10 612 votes and was the third most-elected candidate on the CSV list in his district. This entitled him to a further seat in the Chamber of Deputies. However, as the CSV was not part of the Bettel I government, he became a member of the opposition. Gloden was a member of the Commission of Inquiry into the Service de Renseignement de l'État, and member of the Commissions on (internal) rules; institutions and constitutional reform; on public force and vice-president of the Legal Affairs Commission. In 2014, he also became member of the commission on economy.

In 2018, Gloden was again candidate for the CSV in the East constituency. While his party lost votes and got 29.4%, the number of seats remained stable. Gloden was again third most-elected on the list of his party, with 9 754 votes (less than 2013), which secured him a seat in the Chamber of Deputies. He was member of the same parliamentary commissions as before, and became vice-president of the commission on institutions and the constitutional review. In the latter, he was the CSV's new constitutional expert. Paul-Henri Meyers, who was regarded as the architect of the new constitution and the driving force behind the constitutional reform in the CSV, no longer stood in the 2018 elections. Under Gloden's leadership on the constitution, the CSV cancelled its agreement with the DP, LSAP and Greens on the referendum on the major constitutional reform. Instead of a major revision, it was now decided that parliament would vote on four smaller, but almost identical, amendments to the constitution. A referendum was no longer planned. Gloden prevented the complete independence of the public prosecutor's office, which was originally envisaged in the constitutional reform, so that the government could continue to influence the judiciary through it. He also successfully campaigned for the head of state to be referred to as the Grand Duke again in the constitution, which had also not been provided for in the original revision proposal.

Another project of Gloden was giving police the possibility of issuing a dispersal order to beggars or homeless people. Together with his CSV colleague Laurent Mosar, Gloden introduced a motion to insert such a paragraph into the new police law of 2017. It did not pass in parliament and was seen as a political move against the DP before the communal elections. On a local level, the DP of Luxembourg City was lobbying for such a possibility, while at the national level, the party could not convince it's coalition partners. Nevertheless, Gloden's proposal was interpreted as a move against poor and homeless people: a motive that Gloden would often be accused of in the further course of his political career.

=== Minister for Home Affairs ===
Since 17 November 2023, Gloden is Minister for Home Affairs in the Frieden-Bettel Government. His ministry is in charge of municipal affairs, internal security and immigration.

==== Luxembourg City begging ban ====
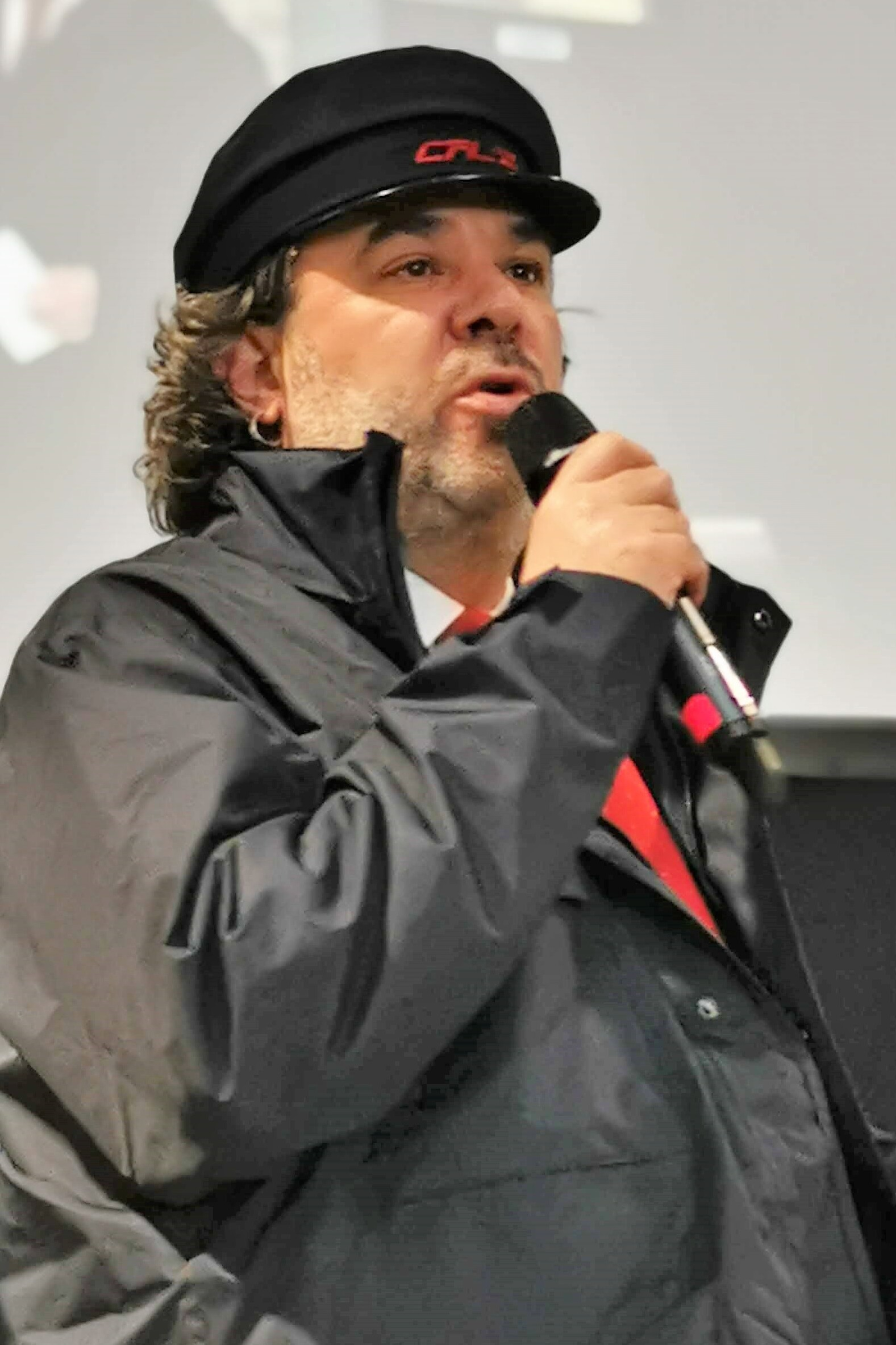
Gloden has accused artist Serge Tonnar (pictured), who wrote a poem criticizing him, of inciting an act of vandalism on his home.

In 2023, Gloden was a central figure in one of the first controversies surrounding the politics of the then new government, when he allowed a change of the police by-law that introduced a begging ban in Luxembourg City. On 11 December 2023, he ruled there was no legal argument against this by-law, contradicting the decision of his predecessor Taina Bofferding. An "information phase" began on 15 December, while recalcitrant beggars had to pay a fine ranging from 24 to 250 euros beginning January 2024. The begging ban was harshly criticized by most opposition parties and a number of NGOs. Some also raised questions about the legality of the ban, arguing it was not in accordance with the constitution or the European Convention on Human Rights, citing the ruling of the European Court of Human Rights in the case of Lăcătuş v. Switzerland.

On the night of 29 January 2023, Gloden's house was vandalized with Graffiti saying "Nee zum Heescheverbued" (No to the begging ban). The tires of his son's car were also slashed. In the aftermath, Gloden shared details of the ongoing police investigation, which is highly unusual. He also accused artist and musician Serge Tonnar to having incited the incident by sharing AI-generated caricatures of and a poem about Gloden, which criticized the begging ban. This statement lead to more critique, arguing that Gloden was disrespecting artistic freedom. Culture minister Eric Thill responded by stating that he would fight to keep the freedom of expression. This debate lead to another caricature by Carlo Schneider, which was published in Tageblatt. The caricaturist was subsequently threatened by ADR deputy Tom Weidig. Critics of Gloden, who distanced himself from Weidig, argued that this was proof his policy pandered to the far right. He and Weidig were called totalitarian. The ban and the discussion drew attention from international media outlets, such as Süddeutsche Zeitung. A year after the introduction of the ban, Luxembourg City officials stated it had positive effects and "begging gangs" had disappeared, while beggars reported that police would drive them off, even if they would beg peacefully – in contradiction with statements by city officials and Gloden that claimed the ban would only target "aggressive begging".

During summer 2024, Gloden presented a law that would introduce a tightened banning order, so police could ban people "disturbing the peace" from certain places for 48 hours. Repeat offenders could be banned for a month, by order of the mayor. This proposal was criticized by NGOs and courts alike as overbearing and threatening the separation of powers.

==== Local police program ====
During the election campaign of 2023, the CSV's program included the introduction of a "communal police". Instead, Gloden started a test phase for a "local police", consisting of police agents wearing a special blue arm band, making them "more visible" to citizens. The project was tested in Luxembourg City (20 agents) and Esch (4 agents) starting in July 2024. Three months after the introduction, Gloden declared the project a success: more people were arrested, let free and arrested again. According to Gloden, over the course of six months, 1,650 additional persons had been controlled by agents wearing the local police arm band. Another unit was deployed in Differdange. Reactions from other politicians were mixed; the opposition criticized Gloden for not presenting hard numbers and using the local police project as a mean for local politicians to present themselves as strongmen without changing much. On 22 May 2025, Gloden presented another local police unit, this time for the Museldall commissariat, covering eight rural communes in the east of Luxembourg, until then not known as a hot spot for crime. This announcement was met with criticism from opposition parties, warning about "arbitrary decisions in the allocation of resources", which would be enshrined in law if Gloden's proposal would come to pass.
