= Reformed Alliance =

Calvinist federation in Germany

The Reformed Alliance (German: Reformierter Bund) in Germany is a Calvinist federation, currently it has 430 congregations and 750 individual members. An estimated 2,000,000 Reformed Christians are in Germany. The moderator is D. Peter Bukowski. It traces back its history to John Calvin and Ulrich Zwingli.

The Reformed Alliance was established in 1884. Members are the Church of Lippe, Evangelical Reformed Church (regional church), the Evangelical Old-Reformed Church in Lower Saxony, the Protestant Reformed Church of Luxembourg, the Evangelical Church in the Rhineland, the Evangelical Church of Westphalia, the Evangelical Church of Hesse Electorate-Waldeck, the Evangelical Church in Hesse and Nassau, the Evangelical Church of Bremen. The headquarters is in Hannover.

It is a member of the World Communion of Reformed Churches.
