= Stéphanie Weydert =

Luxembourgish politician (born 1984)

The Honourable Stéphanie Weydert
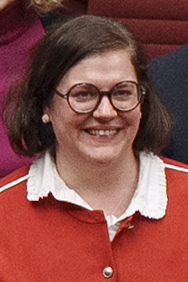

Member of the Chamber of Deputies
- Incumbent
- Assumed office 21 November 2023
- Preceded by: Léon Gloden
- Constituency: East

Personal details
- Born: 30 April 1984 (age 41) Luxembourg City, Luxembourg
- Party: Christian Social People's Party

Stéphanie Weydert (born 30 April 1984) is a Luxembourgish politician. She has served as a member of the Chamber of Deputies from East since 2023. A member of the Christian Social People's Party, she has also served as mayor of Rosport-Mompach since September 2022.
