= Elvinger Hoss Prussen =

Independent Luxembourg law firm

Elvinger Hoss Prussen (EHP) is an independent Luxembourg law firm headquartered in Luxembourg City.

Founded in 1964 by André Elvinger and Jean Hoss, and joined by Yves Prussen in 1974, it specialises in corporate and commercial law, banking and finance, investment funds, taxation, and litigation. The firm has played a role in the development of Luxembourg as an international financial centre, particularly through its involvement in the creation of investment funds and the development of financial legislation.

Elvinger Hoss Prussen has remained independent of multinational law firm networks while developing an international presence. In addition to its Luxembourg headquarters, it has offices in Hong Kong and Paris and works with a partner firm in New York.

== Prominent lawyers from EHP ==
- Luc Frieden, Prime Minister of Luxembourg
- Léon Gloden, Minister for the Interior of Luxembourg
