= Religion in Luxembourg =

Religion in Luxembourg (2021)
1. Catholicism (46%)
2. Protestantism (2%)
3. Eastern Orthodoxy (2%)
4. Other Christians (3%)
5. Agnosticism (25%)
6. Atheism (13%)
7. Islam (1%)
8. Judaism (1%)
9. Buddhism (1%)
10. Other (5%)
11. Undeclared (1%)

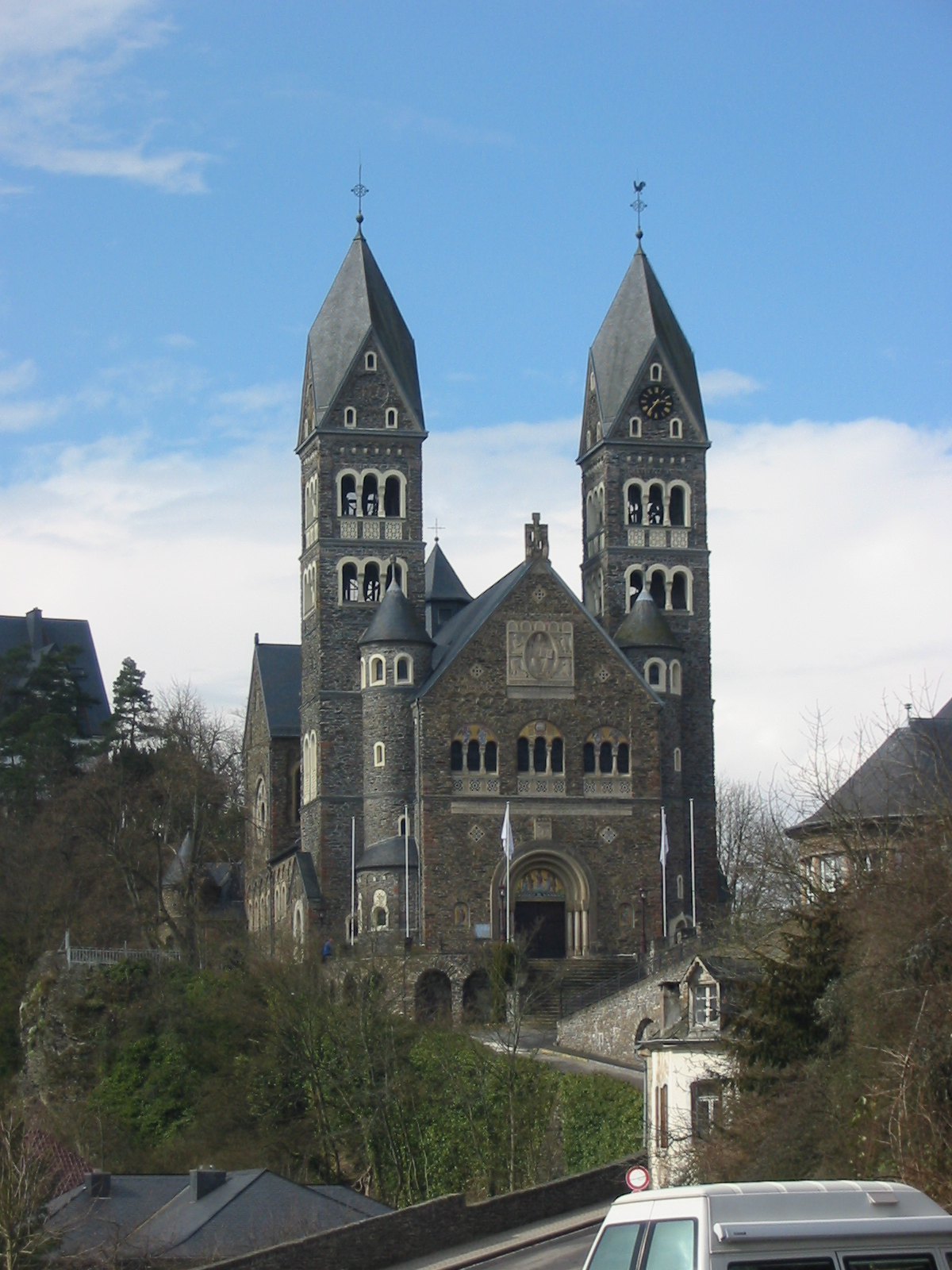
Church in Clervaux, Luxembourg

Christianity is the largest religion in Luxembourg, with significant minorities of non-religious people and adherents of other faiths.

As of 2021, 53% of Luxembourg's population adhere to forms of Christianity (46% are Catholics, 2% are Protestants, 2% are Orthodox Christians while 3% adhere to other Christian denominations). Muslims, Buddhists and religious Jews are each around 1% of the population. Atheists and agnostics make up 38% of the population.

== Demographics ==
Since 1979 it has been illegal for the government to collect statistics on religious beliefs or practices.

According to a 2010 Pew Research Center study 70.4% are Christian, 2.3% Muslim, 26.8% Unaffiliated and 0,5% other religions.

Religious group	Population % 2019	Population % 2021
Christianity	63%	53%
Catholicism	56%	46%
Protestantism	2%	2%
Orthodox Christianity	1%	2%
Other Christians	4%	3%
Islam	2%	1%
Judaism	1%	1%
Buddhism	0%	1%
Atheism	10%	13%
Not religious or agnosticism	16%	25%
Other	6%	5%
Unspecified including "Refusal to answer" and "Do not know"	2%	1%

According to the Eurobarometer Poll 2005,

- 44% of Luxembourgish citizens responded that "they believe there is a God".
- 28% answered that "they believe there is some sort of spirit or life force".
- 22% answered that "they do not believe there is any sort of spirit, God, or life force".

== State intervention ==
Luxembourg is a secular state, but the Grand Duchy recognises and supports several denominations, in exchange for which, the state is allowed a hand in their affairs. This status, first afforded to the Catholic Church, stems from Napoleon's Concordat of 1801, the principles of which have continued to apply to Luxembourg, despite its separation from France in 1815 and its subsequent Dutch ownership.

Despite having the same roots as France's official position of laïcité, Luxembourg's approach to religion has taken a different direction in the past 200 years, reducing the separation of church and state, not increasing it. The state currently recognises the Catholic Church, Judaism, Greek and Russian Eastern Orthodox Christianity, and Protestantism as officially mandated religions. In 2003, representatives of Islam, Anglicanism, and Romanian and Serbian Orthodox Christianity engaged in discussions to be conferred similar status. A process began in the mid-2000s in which increasingly the tight entanglement between church and state in Luxembourg was questioned. This was partially stimulated by several events, such as the debate on Catholic Church sexual abuse or the Grand Duke's religiously motivated refusal to sign a euthanasia bill adopted by Parliament. This led to the 2007 formation of an alliance of eight organisations, who made the separation of church and state their goal. In 2010, a petition was launched under the name of Trennung.lu ("Separation.lu"), that demanded the separation of church and state in Luxembourg. It was supported by, amongst others, the youth wings of several political parties. The Allianz vun Humanisten, Atheisten an Agnostiker, founded in 2010, became one of the most vocal advocates of secularism in Luxembourg.

In January 2015, the government concluded a new convention with the recognised religions, regrouping the Greek, Romanian, Serbian and Russian Orthodox Churches in one Orthodox Church in Luxembourg, represented by the Metropolitan Archbishop of Belgium, Exarch of the Low Countries and Luxembourg, under the jurisdiction of the Ecumenical Patriarchate of Constantinople, and adding the Anglican Church and the Muslim Community of the Grand-Duchy of Luxembourg to the list of recognised religions. This convention has not yet entered into force, however. Moreover, seven non-religious organisations demanded a say in the negotiations about the future financing of religions by the state and the continuation of religion classes in public schools, both of which they demanded be abolished.

== Christianity ==
=== Catholicism ===
Catholicism is the most practised religion in Luxembourg. Luxembourg was a major centre for Christianity during the Middle Ages, Catholicism was sustained through the Reformation by the hierarchy, buildings, and traditions established in the preceding centuries. The Catholic Church has received state support since 1801.

=== Protestantism ===
Protestantism was outlawed in Luxembourg until 1768. By 1815, Luxembourg had small populations of Lutherans, Calvinists, and Waldensians. In 1885, there were 1,100 recorded Protestants out of 213,000 inhabitants of Luxembourg, that is 0.516%. By 1914, there were more than 6,000, or approximately 2.3%. Today it's 3%.

Protestantism is a minority religion in Luxembourg. They are divided across several Protestant churches and creeds, including Lutheranism, Calvinism, Anglicanism, and diverse Evangelical Protestant churches. The largest Protestant churches in the Grand Duchy are the Protestant Church of Luxembourg (PKL), Protestant Reformed Church of Luxembourg (PRKL), Protestant Church in Germany, Church of England, and Protestant Church in the Netherlands. The state has supported the PKL since 1894 and the PRKL since 1982.

== Other Abrahamic religions ==
=== Islam ===
In Luxembourg there are about 18,000 to 20,000 Muslims (est. 2022). In addition, hundreds of Muslims come to work in Luxembourg every workday.

There are six mosques in Luxembourg as well as one multi-use room for Muslims, none of which have minarets. Many Luxembourgish Muslims pray in mosques in France, Belgium or Germany. Most Muslims have origins in the Balkans (Bosniaks and Albanians approximately 60%), while Arab and other Muslim countries represent about 20%. Sub-Saharan African Muslims account for about 5%, and 15% are other Europeans.

=== Judaism ===
Luxembourg's Jewish community dates back at least as far as the 13th century, making Judaism the minority religion that has been practised the longest in Luxembourg. There were 1,500 Orthodox Jews in Luxembourg in 2022. During the Holocaust, 1,945 Jewish Luxembourgers were killed, out of a pre-war population of 3,500. Judaism is supported by the state.

== Dharmic religions ==
=== Hinduism ===
Hinduism in Luxembourg is a minority faith. The Hindu Forum Luxembourg (HFL) was created by 21 members of the Hindu community in Luxembourg from India, Nepal, Mauritius, and Sri Lanka. It is now planning to build a Hindu temple in Luxembourg. The organisation celebrates Hindu festivals such as Krishna Janmashtami, etc.

== Irreligion ==
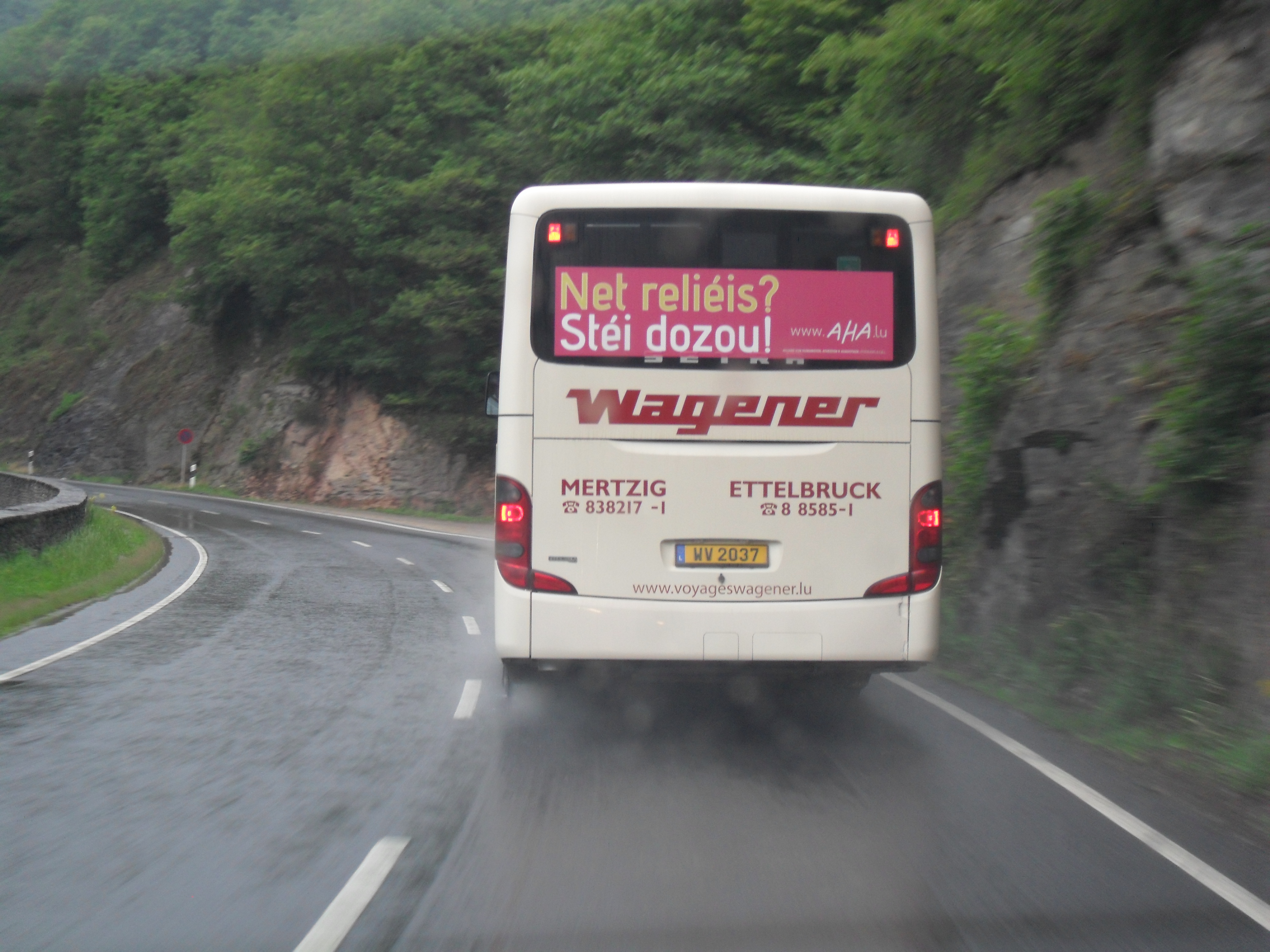
AHA's Atheist Bus Campaign, spring 2011: "Not religious? Stand up for it!"

In the 2000s, surveys showed an increasing share of the population no longer feels connected to Catholicism. In 2002, 94% was still formally Catholic, but in 2008, 25% of the Luxembourgers said they did not belong to any religion. By 2022, over 30% of the populations said they were agnostic, atheist or had no religious belief.

A lot of people were increasingly estranged by the Church's belief system, and yet were still members of it, solidifying the current situation. This caused both the association Liberté de conscience ("Freedom of Conscience") and the Internet portal sokrates.lu to launch the website Fraiheet.lu ("Freedom.lu") in 2009, to inform citizens about the options for religious disaffiliation.

This secularisation, combined with the struggle to separate church and state, eventually led to the foundation of the Allianz vun Humanisten, Atheisten an Agnostiker in the spring of 2010. It intended to unite the hitherto scattered organised activities by humanist, atheist, agnostic, skeptical and secularist thinking people into one force. The foundation was also explicitly welcomed by, amongst others, politicians from several parties.

== See also ==
- Religion in Belgium
- Religion in France
- Religion in the Netherlands
