= Greece–Netherlands relations =

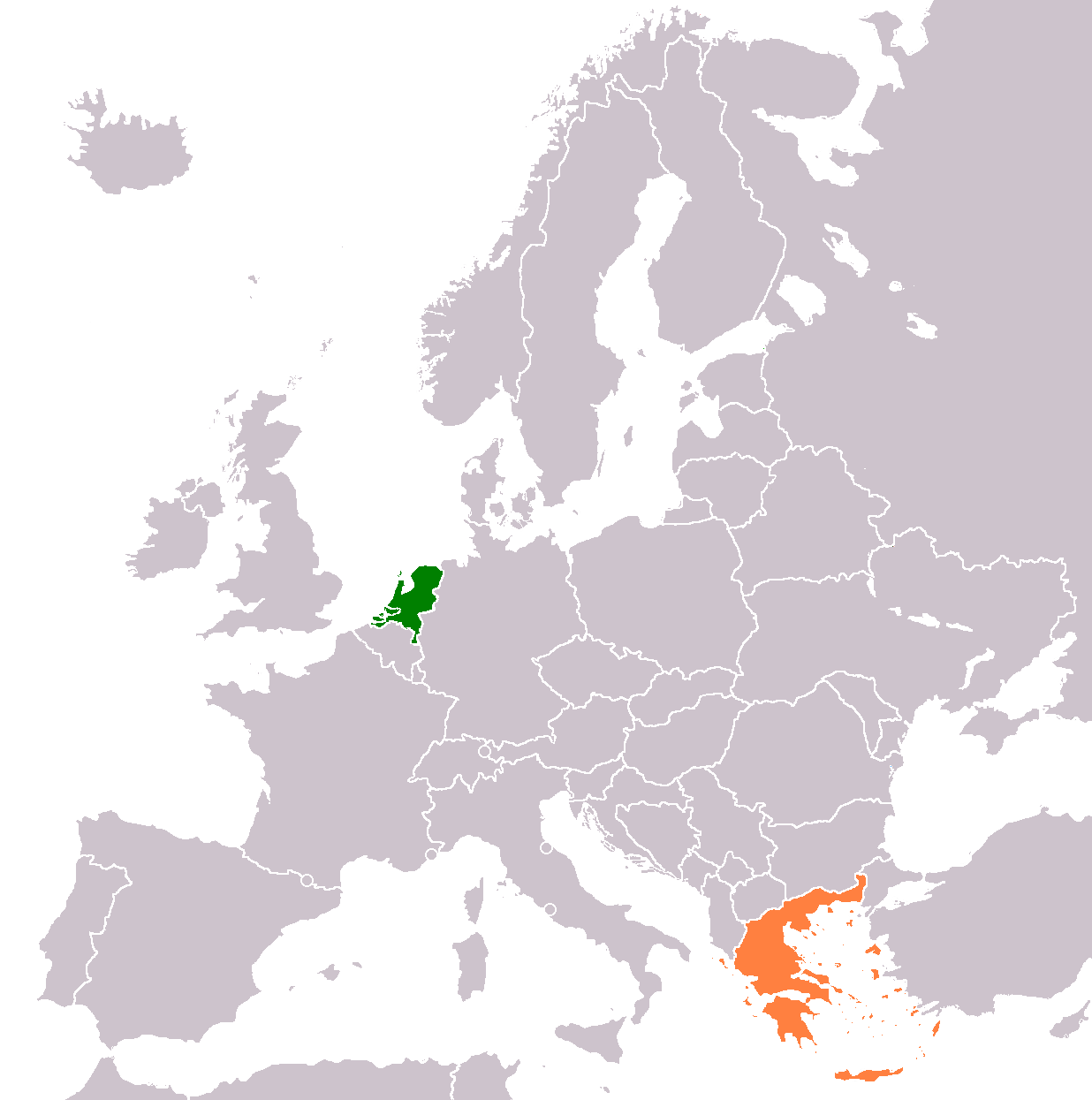
- Netherlands: Greece

Diplomatic mission
- Embassy of the Netherlands, Athens: Embassy of Greece, The Hague

Greece–Netherlands relations are the bilateral relations between the Netherlands and Greece. Since 1834, both countries have diplomatic relations. The Netherlands have an embassy in Athens. Greece has an embassy in The Hague, and a consulate-general in Rotterdam. Both countries are full members of the Council of Europe, the European Union and NATO.

In 1967, the Netherlands and three other countries brought the Greek Case against the Greek junta regime for human rights violations.

== Culture ==
The Netherlands Institute in Athens opened in 1984, and is one of 17 foreign archaeological institutes in Athens.

== Resident diplomatic missions ==
- Greece has an embassy in The Hague.
- the Netherlands has an embassy in Athens.
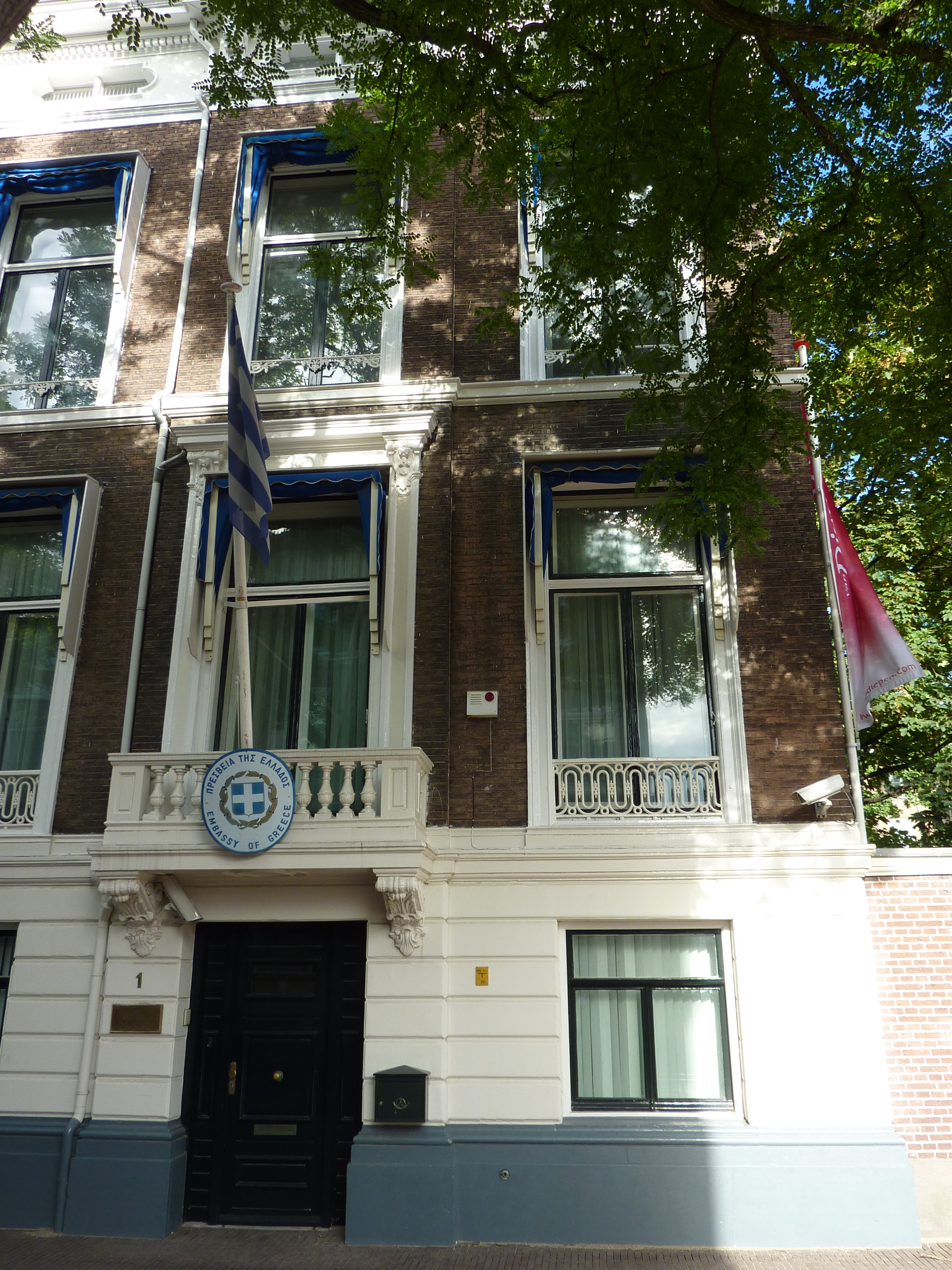
Embassy of Greece in The Hague

Embassy of the Netherlands in Athens

== See also ==
- Foreign relations of Greece
- Foreign relations of the Netherlands
- Greeks in the Netherlands
