= Belgium–Greece relations =

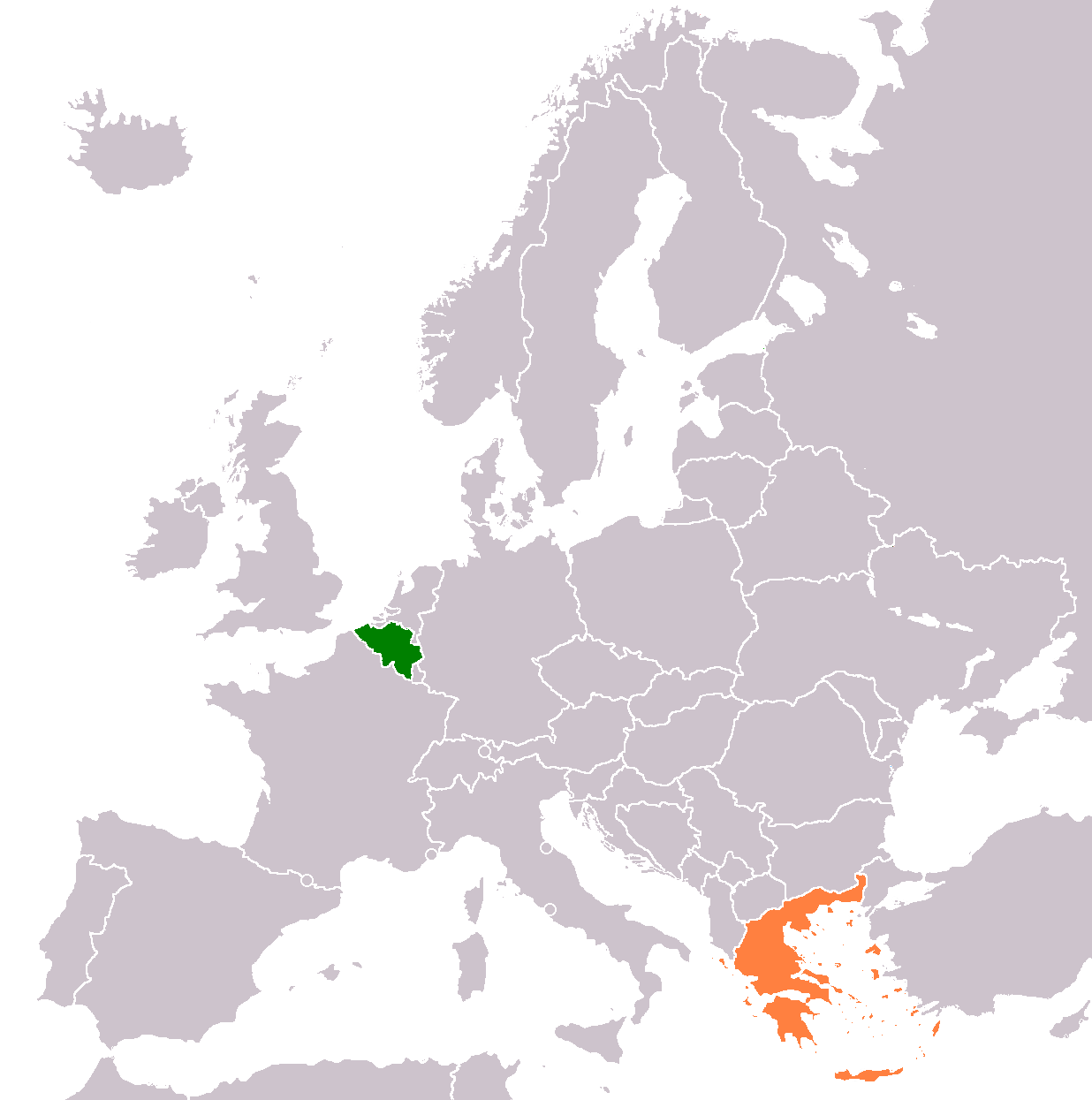
- Belgium: Greece

Belgium–Greece relations are foreign relations between Belgium and Greece. Both countries established direct diplomatic relations in 1874. Belgium has an embassy in Athens and 7 honorary consulates in Corfu, Iraklion, Mytilini, Patras, Piraeus, Rhodes and Thessaloniki. Since 1945, Greece has an embassy in Brussels.

Both countries are full members of the Council of Europe, the European Union and NATO. There are between 15,000 and 26,000 Greeks who live in Belgium. The Belgian School at Athens dates back to the 1960s and was officially accredited in 1985, it is one of the 17 foreign archaeological institutes in Athens.

== Diplomacy ==
Kingdom of Belgium

- Athens (Embassy)

Hellenic Republic

- Brussels (Embassy)

== See also ==
- Foreign relations of Belgium
- Foreign relations of Greece
- Greeks in Belgium
