= Church of Lippe =

Calvinist church in Germany

Ambit of the Church of Lippe among the ambits of other Protestant regional churches in Germany
Basic data
Ambit area:	1,157.74 km^{2} (447.01 sq mi)
Spiritual leader:	Landessuperintendent; Dietmar Arends
Memberships:	RB (as of 1884), EKD (as of 1945), UEK (as of 2004), WCRC (as of 2010), Reformed Alliance as of 2010
Classes:	7
Parishes:	65
Number of parishioners:	126,071 (2025)
Share of parishioners in the overall population in the ambit:	36.7% (2025)
Website:	www.lippische-landeskirche.de

The Church of Lippe (German: Lippische Landeskirche) is a Reformed (Calvinist) member church of the Protestant Church in Germany that covers what used to be the Principality of Lippe.

The seat of the church administration is Detmold. The preaching venue of the spiritual leader (Landessuperintendent) of the Church of Lippe is the Redeemer Church in Detmold. The Church of Lippe comprises 65 congregations and 126,071 members. The Church of Lippe is mostly Reformed with a Lutheran minority (c. 30,000), 80% of the members belonging to one of the 59 Reformed parishes.

== Creeds and memberships ==
Its official Creeds are the Athanasian Creed, Nicene Creed, Apostles Creed, Belhar Confession, Heidelberg Catechism. Barmen Declaration along with Luther's Small Catechism. The denomination is a member of the World Communion of Reformed Churches, of the Union of Evangelical Churches and of the Protestant Church in Germany, also the Reformed Alliance. The Lutheran classis, comprising the Lutheran parishes within the Lippe church, is member in the Lutheran World Federation.

== History ==
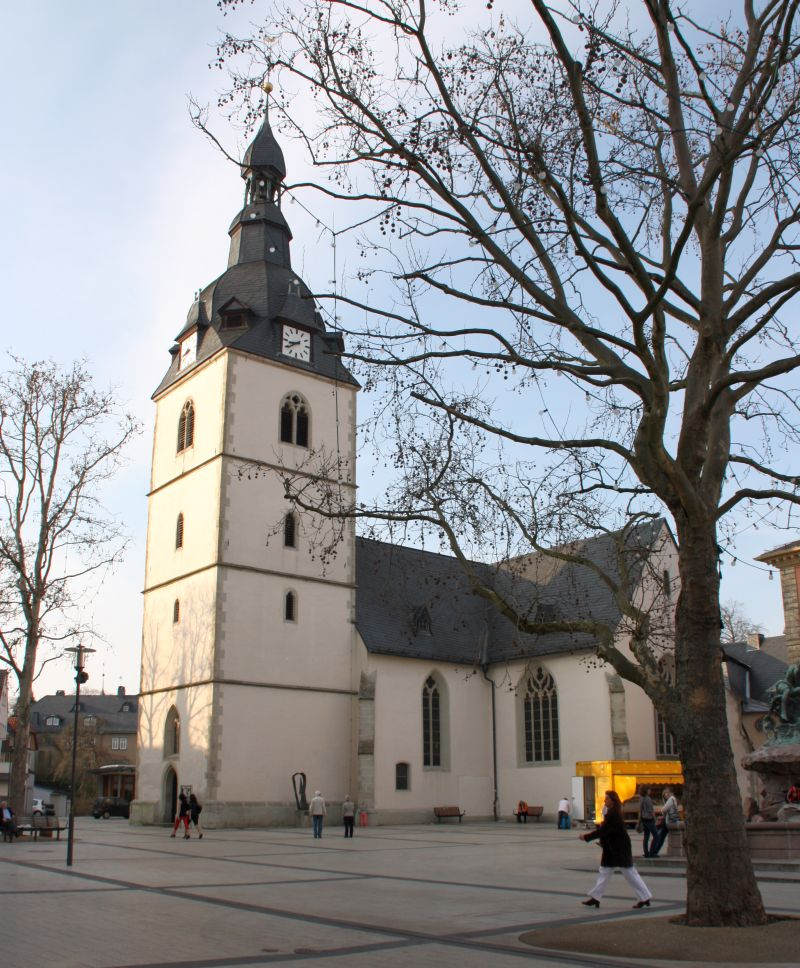
Christ the Reedeemer Church in Detmold

Lutheran worship started in Lemgo in 1522 and by 1533 all the County of Lippe adopted Lutheranism. In 1538 the Lippe Diet adopted a Church Order (constitution), which was adapted in 1571. Simon VI, Count of Lippe adopted the Reformed Faith in 1605 and promoted its spreading within his county, according to the principle cuius regio, eius religio. He prevailed, with his faith mostly superseding the previously dominant Lutheran faith. A minority, mostly in the city of Lemgo, remained Lutheran and in 1617 the city was granted the right to determine its faith independently of the ruling counts. The Church of Lippe was the state church of the County and Principality of Lippe (elevated in 1789) until the end of the monarchy in 1918.

In 1854 the foundation of Catholic parishes was allowed in Lippe and Reformed, Lutheran and Catholic Christians were granted equal rights. In 1877, church-wide bodies independent of the Lippe state government were established, such as the synod. In 1882 the delegates of the Lutheran parishes joined the synod, the Lutheran parishes form within the Church of Lippe their own classis since 1888. As spiritual leader the Lutheran classis is headed by a superintendent. The Reformed parishes are organised in six classes. After Leopold IV, Prince of Lippe abdicated on 12 November 1918 his role as supreme bishop (summepiscopate) of the Lippe church ended. The synod (church parliament) then gained full independence.

During Nazi period the church accepted into its ministry many pastors persecuted by the government.

== Practices ==
Ordination of women and blessing of same-sex marriages are allowed.

== Ambit ==
The Lippe Church comprises 69 parishes within the territory of the former Free State of Lippe, the republic established after the end of Lippe's monarchy, in its then borders.

== Parishioners ==
- 1922: 143,000
- 2012: 177,000

== Spiritual leaders ==
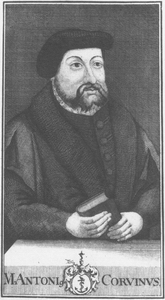
Antonius Corvinus

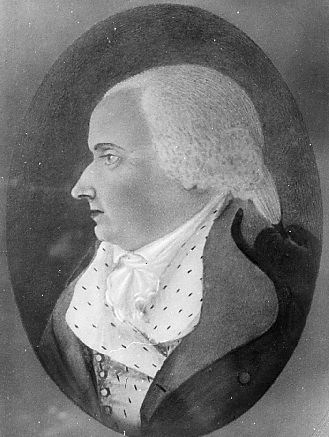
Ferdinand Stosch

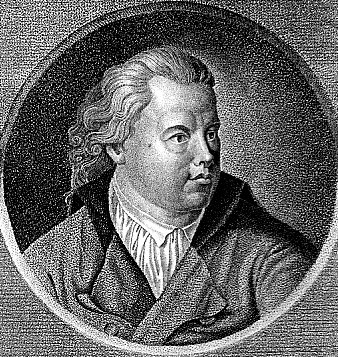
Johann Ludwig Ewald

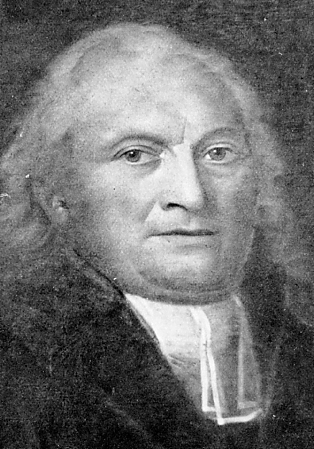
Friedrich von Cölln

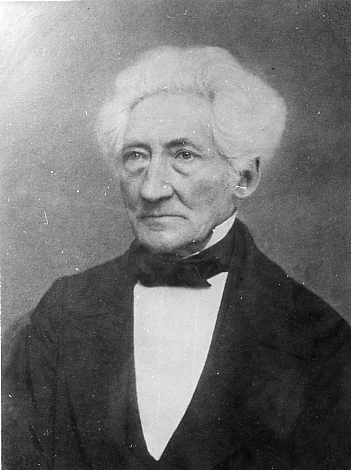
Georg Althaus

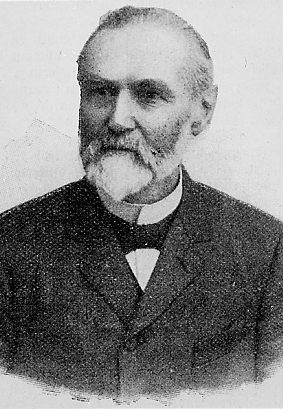
Adolf Koppen

The spiritual leaders of the Church of Lippe were titled general superintendent, in 1936 the title changed to state superintendent (Landessuperintendent). According to the church order of 1931 the Landessuperintendent is to be elected by the synod (i.e. general assembly). Before turning sixty-six years old the incumbent is supposed to retire. The Landessuperintendent represents the Church of Lippe to the outside and leads the church in times the synod does not hold its regular conventions. As to the Reformed members of the church the Landessuperintendent functions as the spiritual leader. As to the Lutherans in the Church of Lippe this function is fulfilled by the superintendent of the Lutheran classis. Since 1 May 2005 Andreas Lange is the Lutheran superintendent.

=== List of incumbents ===
The data concerning incumbents until 1881 follow August Dreves.

- 1538–1563: no appointment
  - 1542: Antonius Corvinus/Anton Rabener (1501–1553), appointed to conduct a general church visitation; general superintendent for Calenberg since 1542
- 1563–1599: Johann von Exter/Joannes Exterus, last Lutheran general superintendent
- 1599–1618: Henrich Dreckmeyer/Heinrich Dreckmeier (died 1618)
- 1619–1626: Erasmus Phoenius (died 1640)
- 1626–1631: Johann Mutius (died 1631, aged 42)
- 1631–1637: Johann Obenolius
- 1638–1650: Henrich Thulemeyer (died 1657), contested due to his temperament, furloughed
- 1650–1677: Conrad Sustmann/Sostmann (died 1677, aged 65)
- 1677–1691: Jacob Zeller/Johann Jakob Zeller (Zürich, 2 March 1626 – 12 October 1691, Detmold)
- 1692–1714: Johann Vineator/Johann Weingärtner (died 1714)
- 1715–1722: Johann Conrad Schieß (died 1725 in England), suspended in late summer 1721 due to "scandalous behaviour and obnoxious way of life", in 1722 illicit emigration
- 1722–1727: Hermann Diederich Rickmeyer (1678–1751), deposed due to neglect of duty
- 1728–1743: Dietrich Köhleraus
- 1744–1746: Friedrich Christian Müller (died 1746)
- 1746–1761: Caspar Curtius (1700–1761)
- 1762–1770: Christoph Philipp Erp-Brockhausen (1712–1770)
- 1771–1780: Ferdinand Stosch (1717–1780)
- 1781–1796: Johann Ludwig Ewald (1747/1748–1822)
- 1796–1804: Ludwig Friedrich August von Cölln (1753–1804)
- 1805–1837: Ferdinand Weerth
- 1837–1857: Georg Althaus (1789–1863), resigned
- 1857–1860: vacancy
  - 1857–1860: August von Cölln, consistorial councillor, per pro
- 1860–1865: August von Cölln (died 1865)
- 1866–1868: Friedrich August Wessel/Weßel (1813–1868)
- 1869–1886: Adolf Koppen (1827–1902)
- 1886–1901: Johannes Credé (1827–1904)
- 1901–1930: August Wessel/Weßel (1861–1941)
- 1930–1936: vacancy
- 1936–1958: Wilhelm Neuser (1888–1959)
- 1959–1970: Udo Smidt (1900–1978)
- 1970–1979: Fritz Viering (1910–1979)
- 1980–1996: Ako Haarbeck (born 1932)
- 1996–2005: Gerrit Noltensmeier (born 1941)
- 2005–2013: Martin Dutzmann (born 1956)
- 2014–to date: Dietmar Arends (born 1963)
