= Evangelical Old-Reformed Church in Lower Saxony =

The Evangelical Old-Reformed Church in Lower Saxony (German: Evangelisch-altreformierte Kirche in Niedersachsen) is a Reformed free church in Lower Saxony with 14 congregations and 7,000 members. The church was established in 1838 in Bentheim, Germany. They separated because of the liberal trends in the Reformed Church of Bentheim (since 1882 part of the Reformed Church of the Province of Hanover, which merged in 1989 in the Evangelical Reformed Church in Bavaria and Northwestern Germany). Between 1923 and 2004 the Old-Reformed Church formed part of the Reformed Churches in the Netherlands.

The denomination adheres to the Heidelberg catechism, the Belgic Confession and the Canons of Dort. It is not a member of the Evangelical Church in Germany, but a part of the Reformed Alliance and the World Communion of Reformed Churches

The movement was primarily resonating with the Dutch Secession and was led by the Bentheimers Harm Hindrik Schoemaker (1800-1881) and Jan Barend Sunday (1810–93); The father of the famous Reformed Dogmatician Herman Bavinck, Jan Bavinck, also played an important role in the denomination.
