= Trinity Church, Luxembourg =

Protestant church in Luxembourg City

Coordinates: 49°36′33″N 06°07′56″E

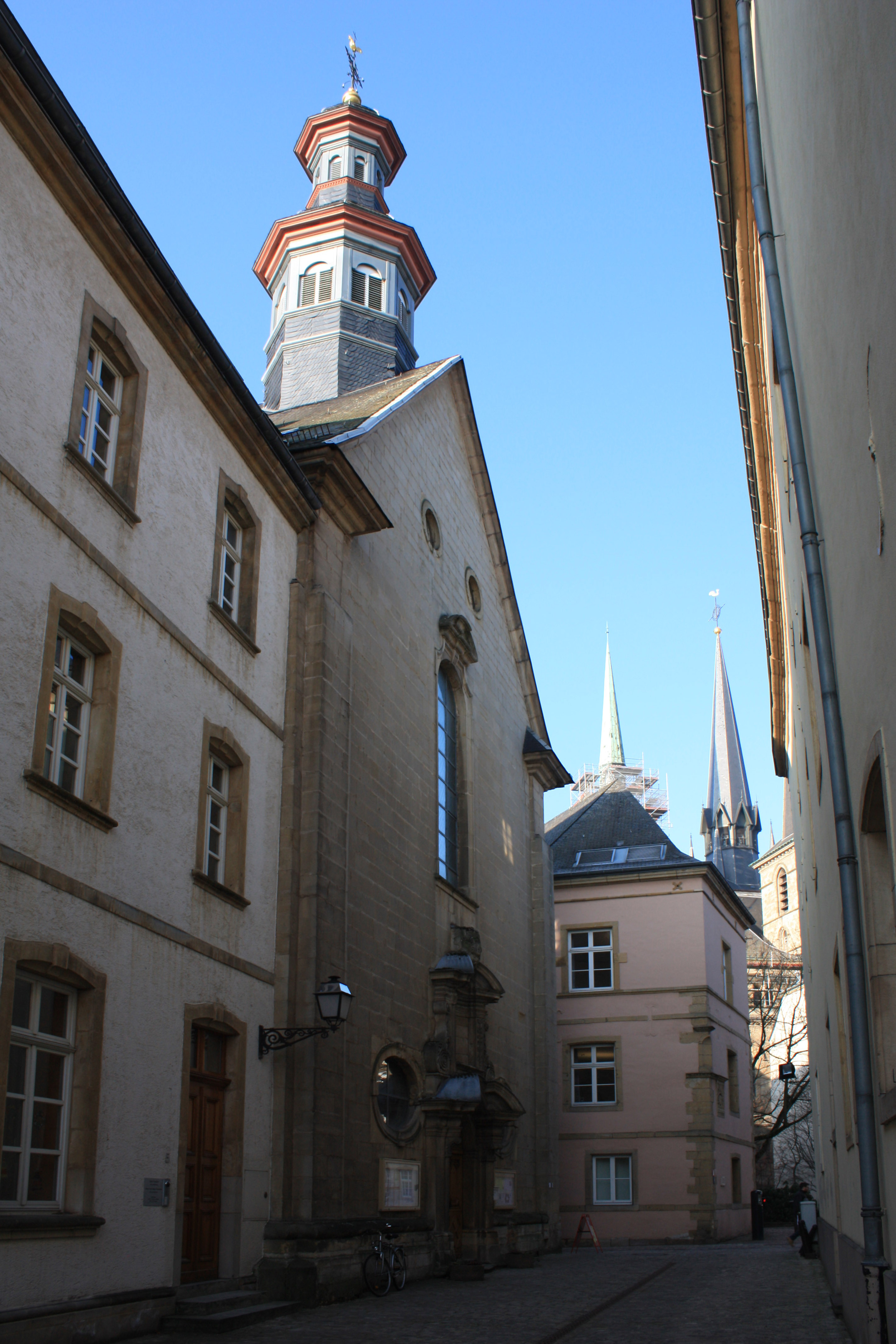

Trinity Church, (Note: Luxembourgish: Dräifaltegkeetskierch; French: Église de la Trinité; German: Dreifaltigkeitskirche) also known as the Protestant Church, has been used since 1814 for Protestant services in Luxembourg City. It is located on Rue de la Congrégation in the city's Ville Haute district, and is the only Protestant church in the country alongside the one in Esch-sur-Alzette.

== History ==
=== Congregation church ===
Around 1333, Friedrich von Meysenburg had a chapel built on this spot. In 1602, the Dominicans built a convent around the church. When the Jesuits established themselves nearby and built the Athénée de Luxembourg and the Jesuit church, which is now Notre-Dame Cathedral, the Dominicans moved to the Fish Market, and in 1628 sold the monastery and church to the Canonesses of Saint-Augustin of the Notre-Dame Congregation. This order was founded in 1597 in the Duchy of Lorraine by Alix Le Clerc and the abbot Pierre Fourier. In Luxembourg, they are colloquially called Sophie-Schwësteren, and have devoted themselves to the education of girls since their foundation.

During the siege of the city by the troops of Louis XIV in 1684, the church and monastery were bombarded and destroyed, but then rebuilt. In 1737 the cornerstone of a new church was placed on the foundations of the old church. This new church, very similar to St. Paulinus' Church in Trier, was the first large Baroque building in the city. In 1745 the church was consecrated to the Holy Trinity by the suffragan bishop of Trier, Lothar Friedrich von Nalbach. It received its first altars in 1770. These are now in Saint Michael's Church, and in the churches of Baschleiden and Everlange. A large painting by Jean-Pierre Sauvage is now in the church of Hellange. These pieces of art from Trinity Church had to be brought to safety in 1795 from French Revolutionary troops.

Until this time, a crypt under the church was used as a burial site. In two rows on top of each other, as in the Roman Catacombs, 32 graves are located, in which 125 canonesses are buried. In the crypt, there are also two grave stones, of the founders of the monastery, namely Anne-Marie von Mansfeld (1585–1657) and Marguerite von Busbach (1579–1651). The crypt was only rediscovered in 1939, under Public Works minister René Blum, while the church was being renovated. Workers found an ornament on a wall with the inscription "Sanguis Eius Super Nos" (His blood [be] on us – Matthew 27:25).

During the time of the French Revolution, the church was used as a fodder store and later as a theatre.

=== Protestant church ===
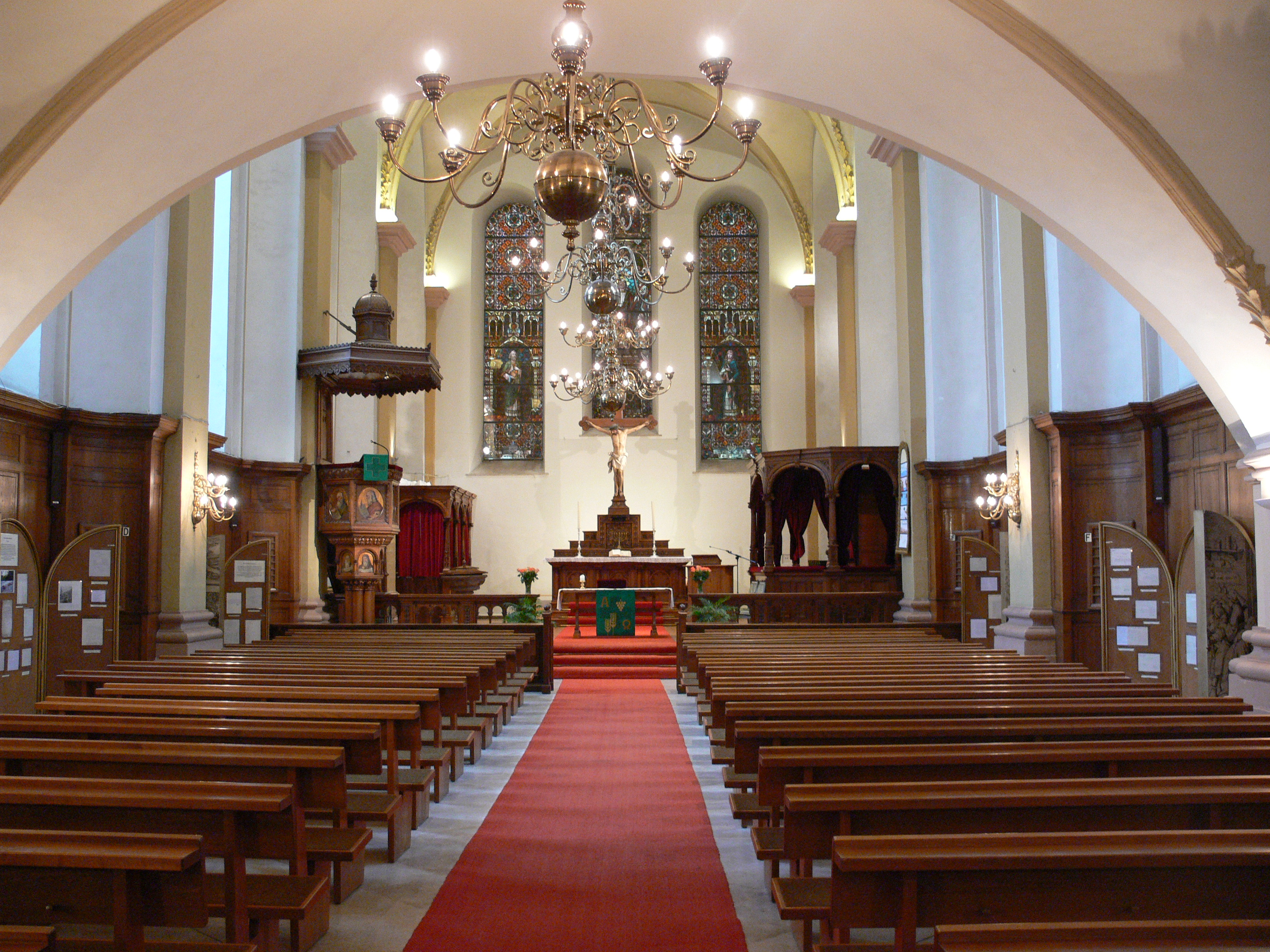

After the Congress of Vienna, the Dutch King William I became Grand Duke of Luxembourg in 1815. By royal decree on 20 October 1817, the congregation church was rebuilt by the State as a garrison church for the Protestants among the Prussian garrison troops. Around this military community, a Protestant civil community emerged, composed of civil servants, soldiers, craftsmen, and guest workers.

In 1890, after the Nassau-Weilburg dynasty took over the Luxembourg throne with Grand Duke Adolphe, Trinity Church became the church of Luxembourg's ruling dynasty. The Grand Duke therefore donated three stained-glass windows in 1901 on the east wall. The altar, the sacristy, the pulpit, the monarch's box, the baptismal font and the chandelier were also donated by the Grand Duke.

On Adolphe's death, his son William IV came to the throne, and married the Catholic Infanta Marie Anne of Portugal. The marriage agreement stipulated that all male children would be raised Protestant, and all females would be raised Catholic. The couple had six daughters, and thus the ruling house of Luxembourg became Catholic.

The organ was built in 1877 by Stumm of Rhaunensulzbach. Donations for the organ came, amongst others, from the Grand Duke of Saxe-Weimar. The organ, renovated in 1998, has 1,350 pipes.

== See also ==
- Protestant Church of Luxembourg
