= Protestant Church of Luxembourg =

- Classification: Protestant
- Orientation: Reformed and Lutheran
- Polity: Episcopal
- Associations: Alliance of Protestant Churches in Luxembourg
- Region: Luxembourg
- Founder: Grand Duke Adolphe
- Origin: 16 April 1894; Luxembourg City
- Congregations: 5
- Members: 1,300

The Protestant Church of Luxembourg (Luxembourgish: Protestantesch Kierch vu Letzebuerg, French: Église Protestante de Luxembourg, German: Evangelische Kirche von Luxemburg) is a Protestant denomination that operates solely in Luxembourg. It is a united church, unifying facets of Calvinism and Lutheranism.

The church was founded by order of Grand Duke Adolphe on 16 April 1894. At the time, the state supported Roman Catholicism, under the Concordat of 1801, and Adolphe sought to redress the balance by recognising the country's Protestant minority. However, the Protestant population was divided into several denominations, including Lutherans, Calvinists, and Waldensians. Adolphe decided to create a new church that synthesised the Augsburg and Helvetian creeds (i.e. Lutheranism and Calvinism), allowing him to recognise both traditions whilst supporting only one church.

The Protestant Church of Luxembourg has 1,300 registered members, and remains the biggest of several Protestant churches. The general assembly of the church elects every three years half the members of the Consistory, the executive body, each for a six-year term. The consistory was first constituted according to the statutes enacted to this end in 1894. The consistory runs the consistorial secretariat. The consistory is responsible to the general assembly. The latter and the consistory together elect one of the active pastors of the church to serve as the ecclesiastical president (Chef de culte; Kirchenpräsident). Other Protestant churches operating in Luxembourg include the Protestant Reformed Church of Luxembourg, the Association Mennonite Luxembourgeoise, the Protestant Church in Germany, the Church of England, the Protestant Church in the Netherlands, the Church of Denmark.

Ordination of women and blessings of same-sex marriages are allowed.

== See also ==
- Trinity Church, Luxembourg
