= Protestant Reformed Church of Luxembourg =

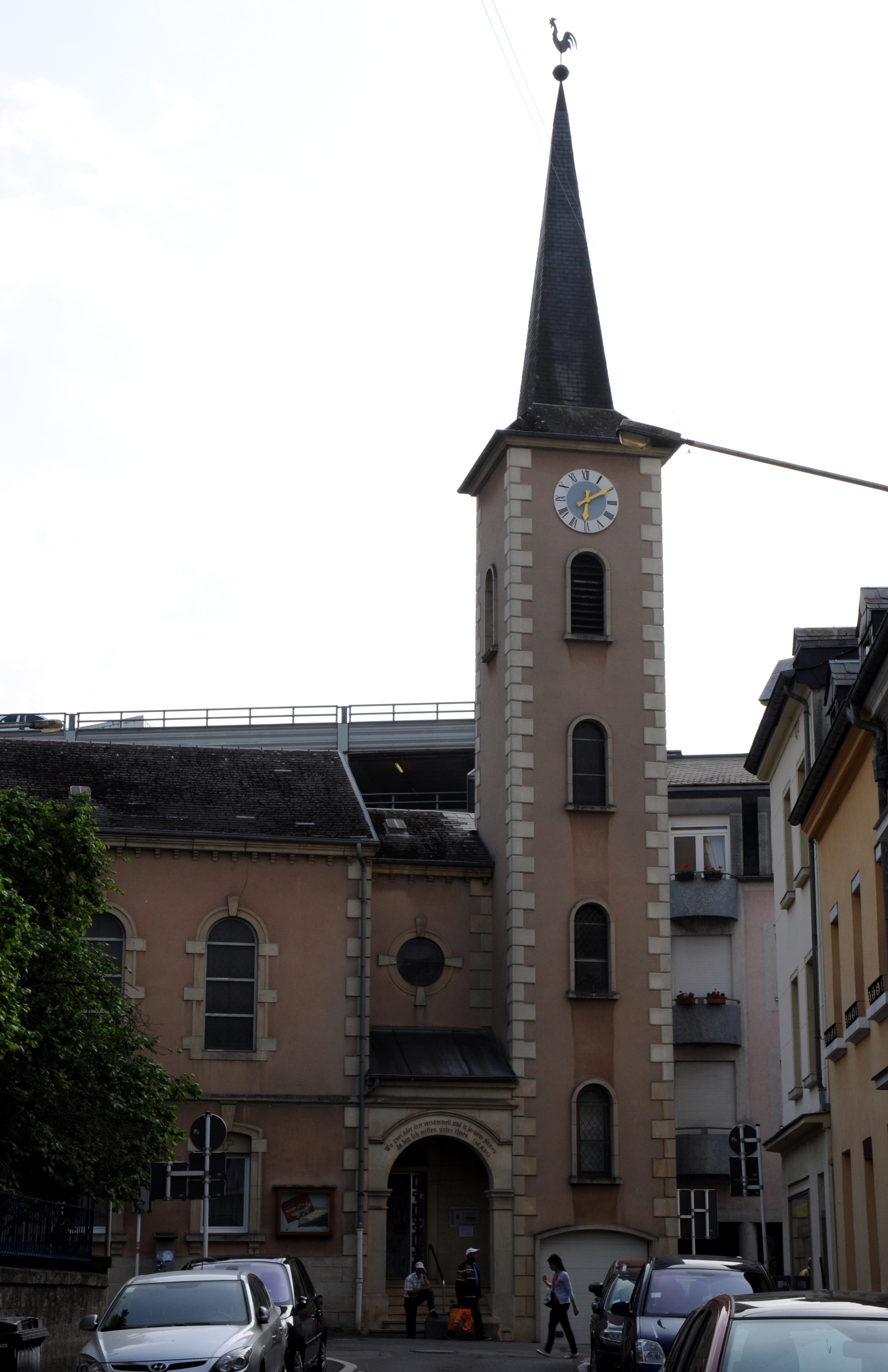
Protestant Reformed Church of Luxembourg

The Protestant Reformed Church of Luxembourg (Luxembourgish: Protestantesch-Réforméiert Kierch vu Lëtzebuerg, French: Église Protestante Réformée du Luxembourg, German: Protestantisch-Reformierte Kirche von Luxemburg) is a Protestant Reformed denomination that operates solely in Luxembourg.

Established in 1982 by decree of Grand Duke Jean, it is one of the six state-supported denominations in Luxembourg. It has about 100 members in one church. Member of World Communion of Reformed Churches and of the Reformed Alliance. Ordination of women and blessings of same-sex marriages are allowed.

== See also ==
- Religion in Luxembourg
