= Minister for the Interior of Luxembourg =

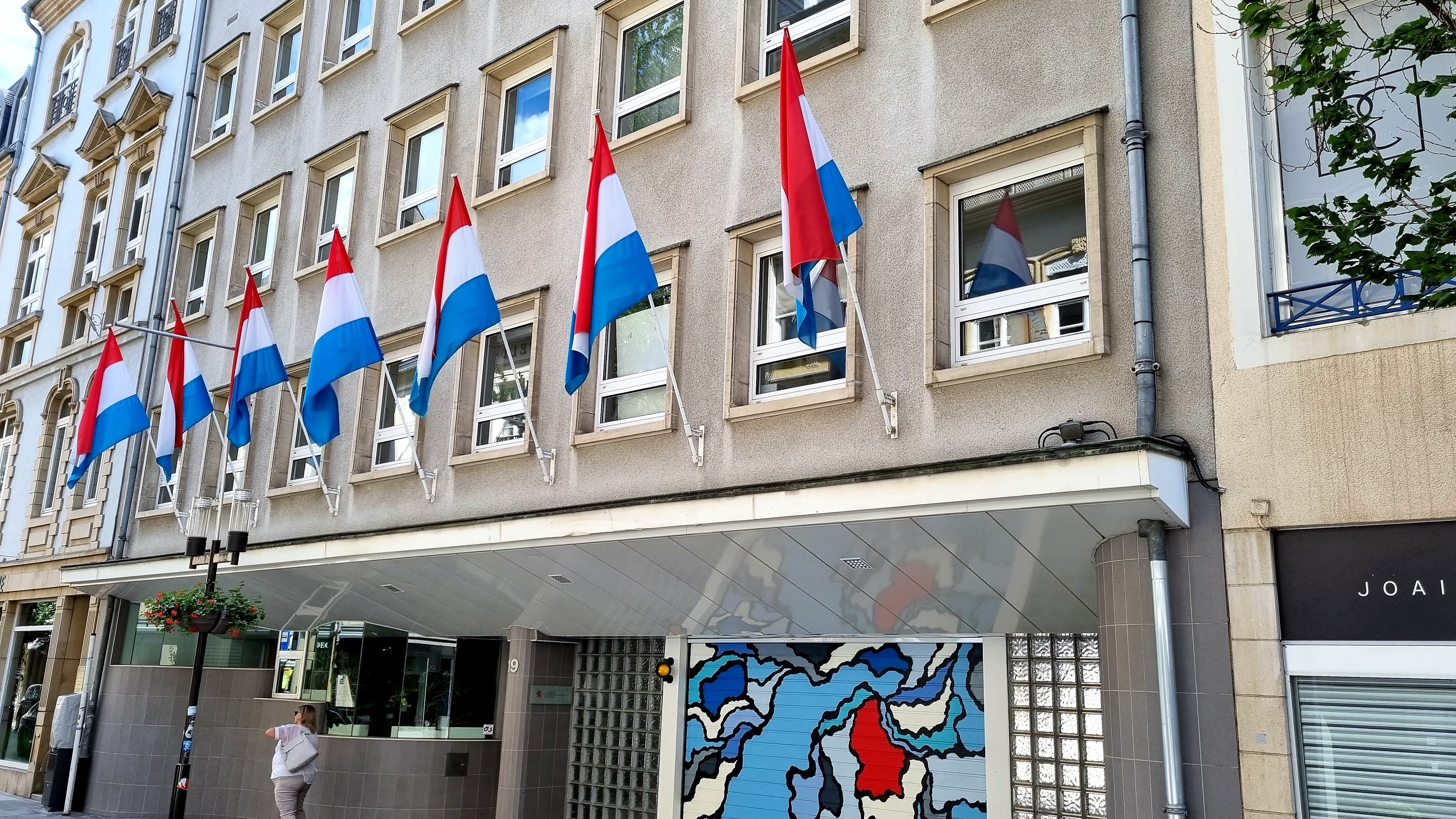
Luxembourg, Ministry of the Interior. The national flag on the occasion of the Luxembourg National Day (2021).

The minister for the interior of Luxembourg is responsible for regional planning, including relations with neighboring German, French and Belgian regions in the context of the "Greater Region of Luxembourg". He/she is also responsible for relations with the communes and, since 2009 again, for the police. Since 17 November 2023, the minister is Léon Gloden.

== See also ==
- List of ministers for the police force of Luxembourg
