= Allianz vun Humanisten, Atheisten an Agnostiker =

Organization

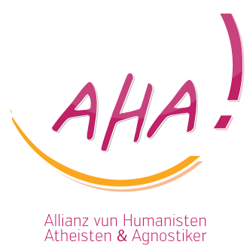
- Abbreviation: A.H.A. Lëtzebuerg; AHA!
- Formation: 13 May 2010
- Type: Nonprofit organisation
- Purpose: Promoting secular humanism, secular education and church-state separation
- Headquarters: Luxembourg City
- Location: 1, rue Guillaume de Machault
- Region served: Luxembourg
- Chair: Robert A.P. (Bob) Reuter
- Affiliations: European Humanist Federation, International Humanist and Ethical Union
- Website: aha.lu

The Allianz vun Humanisten, Atheisten an Agnostiker (lit. 'Alliance of Humanists, Atheists and Agnostics') is a Luxembourgish association that serves the interests of atheists, humanists, skeptics and agnostics in the Grand-Duchy, who according to Humanists International, represented 51% of the population in 2022. It also explicitly supports secularist positions. Its official abbreviation is A.H.A. Lëtzebuerg; usually this is shortened to AHA, sometimes with an extra exclamation mark. The AHA was founded on 13 May 2010 as an association without lucrative purpose (asbl). AHA is a member of the European Humanist Federation and the International Humanist and Ethical Union. From 2010 up to 10 May 2019, the association was chaired by biologist Dr. Laurent Schley. The current chair is psychologist Dr. Robert A.P. (Bob) Reuter.

== History ==
For historical reasons, especially because of the century-long subordination to the House of Habsburg, a great part of the Luxembourgish population is formally a member of the Roman Catholic Church (2002: 94%). Their position is strengthened to this day by several privileges granted to this religious community, be it by treaty or informally. The traditionally strongest party in the Luxembourgish Parliament, the Christian Social People's Party (CSV), tends to support the Catholic Church. The Luxemburger Wort, the country's largest newspaper, belongs to the Saint-Paul Luxembourg publishing group, of which the Catholic Church is also the largest shareholder.

A process began in mid-2000s in which increasingly the tight entanglement between church and state in Luxembourg was questioned. This was partially stimulated by several events, such as the debate on Catholic Church sexual abuse or the Grandduke's religiously motivated refusal to sign a euthanasia bill adopted by Parliament. This led to the 2007 formation of an alliance of eight organisations, who made the separation of church and state their goal. Meanwhile, a lot of people were increasingly estranged by the Church's belief system, and yet were still members of it, solidifying the current situation. This caused both the association Liberté de conscience ("Freedom of Conscience") and the Internet portal sokrates.lu to launch the website Fraiheet.lu ("Freedom.lu") in 2009, to inform citizens about the options for religious disaffiliation. In 2010, a petition was launched under the name of Trennung.lu ("Separation.lu"), that demanded the separation of church and state in Luxembourg. It was supported by, amongst others, the youth wings of several political parties.

These advances eventually led to the foundation of the AHA in the spring of 2010. It intended to unite the hitherto scattered organised activities by humanist, atheist, agnostic, skeptical and secularist thinking people into one force. The foundation was also explicitly welcomed by, amongst others, politicians from several parties. Soon after, several actions, regular press releases and debate contributions resulted in resonance in the country's media. A questionnaire action held in April 2011, in which the MPs were asked about their opinion on the financial separation of church and state, as well as a philosophically neutral moral education in schools, was answered by members of all factions except the CSV. The website Fraiheet.lu was taken over by the AHA in May 2011.

The AHA is also recognised as an interlocutor from the side of the Roman Catholic Archdiocese of Luxembourg. In December 2011, members of the Alliance met with the Luxembourgish Archbishop Jean-Claude Hollerich and other representatives of the Archdiocese. Although this meeting clearly showed distinct positions, there were also areas of common ground to be found. It was agreed to henceforth remain in dialogue with each other. In January 2015, AHA was amongst seven nonreligious organisations that demanded a say in the negotiations about the future financing of religions by the state and the continuation of religion classes in public schools, both of which they demanded to be abolished.

== Positions ==
The AHA has four main goals:

- Separation between church and state: the AHA strives towards restriction of the state's church subsidies, as well as becoming philosophically neutral. It values secular education instead of the currently existing religious instruction in schools.
- Ethics free of dogma: a morality grounded in humanism is to be preferred over a religion-based one, which discriminates people positively or negatively based on their religious affiliation.
- Knowledge instead of faith: scientific insights should not be questioned by religious dogmas. This is the case with, for example, the theory of evolution, that is rejected by advocates of creationism.
- Celebrating – without "God": the AHA supports a celebratory culture, which does not align itself with religious traditions such as baptism, communion or church weddings; instead, it propagates secular alternatives.

With its programme, it is closely following the German Giordano Bruno Foundation.

== Activities ==
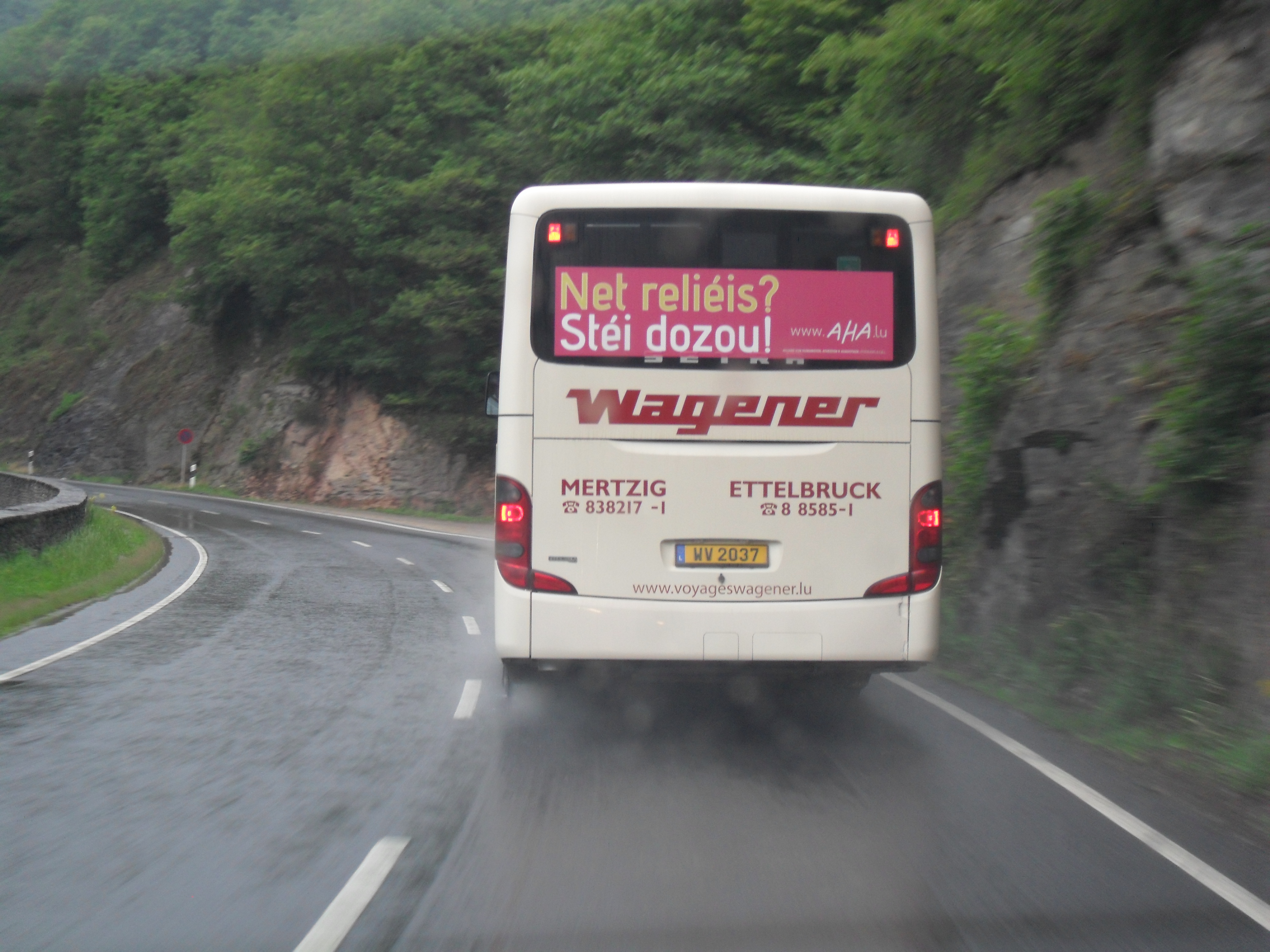
Bus campaign Luxembourg, spring 2011: "Not religious? Stand up for it!"

One of the first bigger actions of the AHA was the independent initiative of a poster action in spring 2011, in the frame of the globally held Atheist Bus Campaign. Having chosen the slogan Net reliéis? Stéi dozou! ("Not religious? Stand up for it!") it sought to persuade people to no longer hide their nonbelief in religious ideas, but to publicly stand up for it. The campaign led to a heated debate on free speech versus religious discrimination, with some people calling for the campaign to be suspended. Parliamentarians from The Greens, The Left, the LSAP and the Democratic Party asked Transport Minister Claude Wiseler whether, and if so why, the campaign would be interrupted. Because the campaign fell within the constitutionally enshrined freedom of expression, however, the government would not have been able to prohibit it; only the transport companies could refuse or cancel advertisements, and they saw no reason to do so.

The AHA also participates intensively in the public debate about the overhaul of the Luxembourgish Constitution. In its present form, the Constitution goes back to the situation of 1868, and important societal and political actors consider it to be outdated and no longer fitting current times. The AHA's main focus about the contents again lies at the achievement of a pure separation of church and state. In a letter to Minister of Religious Affairs François Biltgen of 25 November 2012, the AHA demanded:

1. Introduction of a unique ethics course for all pupils;
2. Strict financial separation between the state and religious or philosophical convictions;
3. Abolition of all conventions that are currently in force;
4. Repeal of articles 22, 106 and 119 of the Constitution;
5. Introduction of a constitutional article stipulating a secular state;
6. Reallocation/transformation of a number of religious buildings for social, cultural, commercial or sportive purposes;
7. Financing of the remaining religious buildings is to be done by the religious convictions themselves.

Since 2012, the AHA stages several public actions during Easter, at which it also provides information on leaving the church. This occurs analogous to similar events in Germany, and with allusions to the Easter Bunny, as Huesefest ("Bunny Festival").

== Literature ==
- Fiona Lorenz: AHA! Auftakt der Humanisten in Luxemburg. Humanistischer Pressedienst, 11 November 2010.
- Fiona Lorenz: Nicht religiös? Steh dazu! Humanistischer Pressedienst, 12 April 2011.
