= Greeks in the Netherlands =

Greeks in the Netherlands Grieken in Nederland Έλληνες στην Ολλανδία
Total population
- 37,382 (CBS, 2023)

Languages
- Dutch, Greek

Religion
- Greek Orthodox Church

Related ethnic groups
- Greeks

Greeks in the Netherlands (Dutch: Grieken in Nederland; Greek: Έλληνες στην Ολλανδία, romanized: Éllines stin Ollandía) number 37,382 as of 2023.

== Religion ==
The first Greek Orthodox congregation in Amsterdam was founded by Metropolitan Gerasimos Avlonites.

== Notable people ==
- Afrodite Zegers – competitive sailor
- Nikos Vertis – singer
- Mason – record producer
- Stefania Liberakakis – singer
- Mikaela Fotiadis – model
- Marios Lomis – soccer athlete
- Mark Sifneos – soccer athlete
- Michalis Vakalopoulos – soccer athlete
- Odette Keun – journalist

== See also ==
- Greece–Netherlands relations
- Greek diaspora
- Immigration to the Netherlands

== Bibliography ==
- Şentürk, Cem (2008), West Thrace Turkish's Immigration to Europe (PDF), The Journal of International Social Research
