= List of members of the Council of State of Luxembourg =

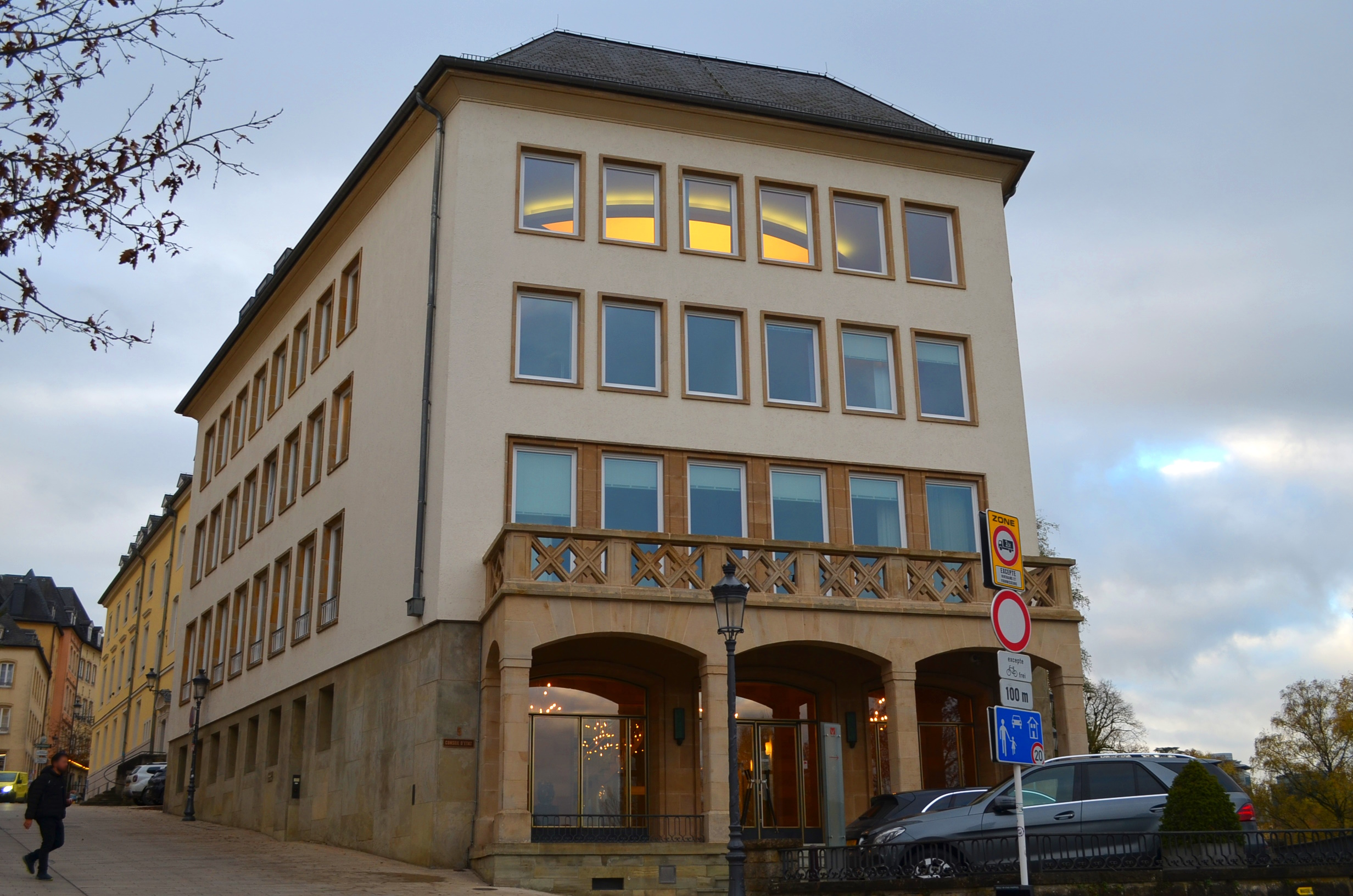
The seat of the Council of State

This is a list of members of the Council of State of Luxembourg. The Council of State has twenty-two members, although this has not always been the case. In total, 214 appointments have been made to the Council of State, including 195 different people, as several have served more than once.

Name	Start	End	Notes
Gaspard-Théodore-Ignace de la Fontaine	28 November 1857	11 February 1871	President 1857–68
Jean-Jacques Willmar	28 November 1857	26 November 1866	
Jean Ulveling (1st time)	28 November 1857	12 November 1858	
Vendelin Jurion	28 November 1857	10 February 1892	President 1871–72
Emmanuel Servais (1st time)	28 November 1857	3 December 1867	
Édouard Thilges (1st time)	28 November 1857	15 July 1859	
Charles-Gérard Eyschen	28 November 1857	28 September 1859	
Ferdinand Pescatore	28 November 1857	25 December 1862	
François Joseph Wirz	28 November 1857	18 January 1863	
Guillaume d'Ansembourg	28 November 1857	10 February 1882	
Charles-Frédéric Mersch-Faber	28 November 1857	25 August 1888	
François-Xavier Wurth-Paquet	6 October 1858	4 February 1885	President 1870–71
Antoine Lefort	10 August 1860	3 March 1889	
Charles-Mathias Simons	28 September 1860	5 October 1874	President 1869–70
Édouard Thilges (2nd time)	28 September 1860	3 December 1867	
Mathias Wellenstein	29 December 1860	1 December 1870	
Pierre Joseph Augustin	13 February 1863	25 September 1872	
Michel Jonas	5 April 1866	16 June 1884	
Chrétien Mersch	5 April 1866	24 January 1873	
Jean Ulveling (2nd time)	14 December 1866	29 October 1877	
Victor de Tornaco	3 December 1867	20 June 1872	
Charles Munchen	14 January 1868	13 August 1881	
Bernard-Hubert Neuman	16 March 1868	27 September 1891	
Édouard Thilges (3rd time)	18 December 1870	20 February 1885	President 1872–74
Lucien Rischard	15 March 1871	18 December 1900	
Emmanuel Servais (2nd time)	27 December 1874	17 June 1890	President 1874–87
Henri Vannérus	27 December 1874	17 May 1921	President 1888–89 and 1895–1914
Georges Ulveling	29 October 1877	30 September 1881	
Nicolas Salentiny	6 August 1878	25 November 1898	
Jean-Baptiste Klein (1st time)	1 March 1882	14 November 1883	
Jules Chromé	9 April 1884	14 January 1899	
Victor de Roebé	22 July 1885	3 January 1889	
Jean-Pierre Toutsch	22 July 1885	30 June 1887	
Joseph Schaack	22 July 1885	25 November 1894	
Victor Thorn (1st time)	22 July 1885	27 September 1888	
Charles Rischard (1st time)	15 February 1888	23 June 1896	
Édouard Thilges (4th time)	10 October 1888	9 July 1904	President 1889–95
Jean-Baptiste Klein (2nd time)	27 November 1889	2 August 1894	
Alexandre de Colnet d'Huart	27 November 1889	12 June 1905	
Émile Faber	2 May 1892	14 March 1927	
Joseph Rischard	2 May 1892	3 March 1915	
Victor Thorn (2nd time)	26 October 1892	3 March 1915	President 1914–15
Jean Franck	30 January 1895	9 May 1896	
Émile Lefort	30 January 1895	12 May 1902	
Henri Neumann	9 August 1896	9 March 1910	
Émile Schlesser	20 November 1896	12 November 1901	
Hereditary Grand Duke William	25 December 1897	4 April 1902	
Joseph Steichen	31 December 1898	23 March 1938	President 1931–32
Ernest Arendt	11 January 1902	11 February 1931	
Paul Ulveling	30 September 1902	5 March 1924	
Mathias Glaesener	30 September 1902	22 October 1924	
Charles Rischard (2nd time)	26 October 1905	12 June 1914	
Ernest Hamélius	7 December 1908	16 November 1945	President 1932–45
Jules Fischer	21 February 1909	31 December 1914	
Henri Kirpach	9 January 1910	26 April 1911	
Victor Thorn (3rd time)	28 December 1914	3 March 1915	
Charles de Waha	3 March 1915	24 November 1916	
Pierre Braun	3 March 1915	16 November 1945	
Joseph Brincour	3 March 1915	29 December 1917	
Léon Kauffman (1st time)	3 March 1915	24 February 1916	
Joseph Thilges	3 March 1915	15 December 1916	
Auguste Ulveling	3 March 1915	26 August 1917	
Mathias Mongenast	6 November 1915	10 January 1926	President 1916–17
Victor Thorn (4th time)	6 November 1915	24 February 1916	President 1915–16
Victor Thorn (5th time)	19 June 1917	15 September 1930	President 1917–30
Ernest Leclère	19 June 1917	27 May 1938	
Léon Kauffman (2nd time)	28 September 1918	16 November 1945	
Léon Moutrier	28 September 1918	21 December 1936	
Antoine Lefort	28 September 1918	19 March 1928	
Joseph Faber	28 September 1918	10 October 1933	
Guillaume Leidenbach	14 April 1923	8 May 1943	
Jean-Baptiste Sax	3 June 1924	16 November 1945	
Jacques Delahaye (1st time)	8 November 1926	16 November 1945	
Georges Faber	18 July 1929	16 August 1936	
François Altwies	6 March 1933	6 July 1936	
Robert Brasseur	6 March 1933	15 February 1934	
Prince Felix (1st time)	23 January 1937	16 November 1945	
Norbert Dumont	23 January 1937	16 November 1945	
Auguste Liesch (1st time)	23 January 1937	16 November 1945	
Léon Schaack	23 January 1937	16 November 1945	
Nicolas Kerschen	23 January 1937	16 November 1945	
Jean Rettel	23 January 1937	16 November 1945	
Adolphe Kunnen	23 January 1937	16 November 1945	
Prince Felix (2nd time)	14 December 1945	25 April 1951	
Léon Kauffman (3rd time)	14 December 1945	14 February 1952	President, 1945–52
Jacques Delahaye (2nd time)	14 December 1945	25 March 1947	
Auguste Liesch (2nd time)	14 December 1945	13 March 1949	
Joseph Thorn	14 December 1945	10 November 1953	
Albert Wagner	14 December 1945	30 July 1958	
Pierre Frieden	14 December 1945	15 July 1948	
Robert Als	14 December 1945	25 March 1947	
Félix Welter	14 December 1945	25 April 1973	President, 1952–69
Michel Rasquin	14 December 1945	9 July 1948	
Alfred Loesch	14 December 1945	31 December 1958	
Maurice Sevenig	14 December 1945	26 June 1975	President, 1969–75
Paul Wilwertz	14 December 1945	29 June 1954	
François Wirtz	14 December 1945	8 November 1947	
Eugène Rodenbourg	28 April 1947	31 October 1972	
Émile Raus	4 August 1948	26 October 1976	President 1975–76
Lambert Schaus	4 August 1948	19 January 1953	
André Origer	4 August 1948	30 November 1978	
Ferdinand Wirtgen	23 October 1950	11 December 1978	President, 1976–78
Prince Jean of Luxembourg	25 April 1951	12 June 1953	
Charles Léon Hammes	26 November 1951	12 June 1953	
Hubert Clément	2 May 1952	29 September 1953	
Albert Goldmann	12 May 1953	4 December 1976	President, 1976
Léon Schaus	12 May 1953	15 July 1977	
Paul Thibeau	1 March 1955	1 October 1972	
François Huberty	1 March 1955	31 October 1972	
Roger Maul	1 March 1955	16 September 1979	President 1978–79
Louis Hencks	12 August 1958	25 February 1974	
Nicolas Margue	4 August 1959	30 September 1970	
Paul Wilwertz (2nd time)	30 December 1959	16 December 1968	
Prince Felix (3rd time)	5 May 1961	24 March 1969	
Joseph Wolter	30 May 1961	17 January 1968	
Joseph Kauffman	14 June 1961	11 June 1979	
Félix Worré	10 July 1961	16 February 1980	
Alex Bonn	17 July 1961	16 June 1980	President, 1979–80
Paul Weber	7 August 1961	2 October 1973	
Victor Bodson	28 August 1961	21 July 1964	
Fernand Georges	26 February 1965	1 January 2000	
Norbert Droessaert	20 March 1968	1 November 1976	
Prince Charles	24 March 1969	26 July 1977	
François Goerens	14 June 1969	2 August 1987	President 1980–87
Alfred Loesch	11 November 1970	1 October 1974	
Robert Schaack	24 October 1972	1 January 1988	
Fernand Zurn	11 November 1972	11 March 1987	
Joseph Foog	24 November 1972	10 June 1985	
Edmond Reuter	7 December 1972	12 February 1990	
Albert Goedert	19 December 1972	1 December 1982	
Ernest Arendt	20 June 1973	6 August 1988	President 1987–88
Paul Beghin	10 January 1974	1 January 2000	President, 1994–2000
Johny Lahure	29 November 1974	20 July 1984	
Annette Schwall-Lacroix	21 July 1975	16 July 1999	
Georges Thorn (1st time)	15 December 1976	1 March 1979	
Gaston Diederich	29 December 1976	11 February 1998	
Lucien Kraus	18 January 1977	1 December 1985	
Cornel Meder	29 July 1977	1 January 2000	
Charles Reiffers	23 December 1978	15 October 1985	
Jules Pierret	23 January 1979	23 January 1991	
René Grégorius	15 March 1979	26 September 1991	
Jean Dupong	24 October 1979	18 May 1994	President, 1991–94
Numa Wagner	26 November 1979	2 October 1992	
Henri Metz	15 April 1980	1 January 2000	
Georges Faber	26 July 1980	1 October 1993	
Hereditary Grand Duke Henri	4 December 1980	9 March 1998	
Raymond Kirsch	13 January 1983	13 January 2001	President, 2000–01
John Castegnaro	22 January 1985	22 January 2003	
Marcel Sauber	28 June 1985	11 March 2003	President, 2001–02
Georges Thorn (2nd time)	12 November 1985	30 October 1991	President, 1988–91
Paul-Henri Meyers	28 November 1985	11 August 1999	
Claude Bicheler	7 April 1987	7 April 2005	
Robert Biever	1 October 1987	31 December 2000	
Charles Ruppert	1 January 1988	1 January 2006	
Jean-Pierre Sinner	26 October 1988	26 October 2006	
Pierre Mores	20 March 1990	30 September 2007	President, 2003–07
Victor Rod	7 March 1991	7 March 2009	
Nicolas Schmit	29 October 1991	30 July 2004	
Alain Meyer	15 November 1991	15 November 2009	President, 2007–2009
Nico Edon	2 October 1992	1 November 2009	
Claude Hemmer	25 November 1993	25 November 2011	
Georges Schroeder	7 June 1994	7 June 2012	President 2009–2012
Carlo Meintz	11 February 1998	5 May 2005	
Victor Gillen	20 December 1999	20 December 2014	President 2012-2014
Georges Pierret	14 January 2000	14 January 2015	
Agnès Rausch	11 February 2000	11 February 2015	
Kik Schneider	8 April 2000	8 April 2015	
Paul Schmit	9 June 2000	9 June 2015	
Françoise Thoma	27 October 2000	27 October 2015	
Albert Hansen	23 February 2001	20 December 2013	
Viviane Ecker	29 March 2001	28 March 2016	President 2014-2016
Albert Rodesch	13 February 2003	13 February 2018	
Ady Jung	28 May 2003	12 December 2010	
Romain Nati	15 October 2004	14 October 2019	
René Kollweter	29 April 2005	9 October 2019	
Hereditary Grand Duke Guillaume	10 June 2005	8 October 2024	
Agnès Durdu	7 April 2006	6 April 2021	President 2019-2021
Georges Wivenes	1 August 2006	31 July 2021	President 2016-2019
Marc Schaefer	18 December 2006	18 December 2021	
Roger Molitor	15 February 2008	31 December 2014	
Patrick Santer	27 April 2009	26 April 2024	
Erna Hennicot-Schoepges	10 November 2009	24 July 2013	
Lydie Lorang	1 February 2010	31 January 2025	
Charles Lampers	28 February 2011	7 January 2022	
Dan Kersch	14 December 2011	14 November 2013	
Martine Deprez	31 October 2012	17 November 2023	
Christophe Schiltz	28 November 2013	16 September 2024	President 2021-2024
Lucien Lux	24 December 2013	Present day	
Mike Mathias	28 April 2014	1 February 2019	
Alain Kinsch	4 February 2015	Present day	
Marc Thewes	4 February 2015	Present day	President since 2024
Jeannot Nies	11 May 2015	Present day	
Sam Tanson	7 June 2015	17 April 2018	
Dan Theisen	10 June 2015	Present day	
Héloïse Bock	25 July 2015	Present day	
Marc Colas	27 November 2015	Present day	
Isabelle Schlesser	1 July 2016	Present day	
Véronique Stoffel	5 March 2018	Present day	
Martine Lamesch	24 May 2018	31 December 2021	
Yves Wagener	1 February 2019	13 March 2026	
Deidre Du Bois	30 November 2019	Present day	
Alex Bodry	20 January 2020	Present day	
Marc Meyers	24 March 2021	Present day	
Josiane Pauly	20 October 2021	Present day	
Monique Adams	28 January 2022	Present day	
Paul Wirtgen	14 March 2022	Present day	
Laurent Zeimet	25 March 2022	24 October 2023	
Luc Feller	13 March 2024	Present day	
Alex Penning	21 March 2024	Present day	
Thierry Schuman	24 July 2024	Present day	
Georges Kohn	25 November 2024	15 April 2026	
Lynn Frank	7 May 2025	Present day	
Paulette Lenert	9 June 2026	Present day	
Maximilien Lehnen	29 September 2026	Present day	

== See also ==
- List of presidents of the Council of State of Luxembourg
