= National Union Government (1916) =

Coalition government, 1916–1917

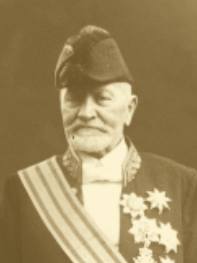
Victor Thorn, prime minister 1916-1917

The National Union Government was a form of national government headed by Victor Thorn that governed the Grand Duchy of Luxembourg between 24 February 1916 and 19 June 1917, at the height of the First World War. At the time, Luxembourg was occupied by the German Empire, but the occupying Germans had promised not to interfere in the country's political machinations, provided that the Luxembourgish government did not aid Germany's enemies. Nonetheless, political life was dominated by the crisis that had enveloped Europe.

== Background ==
The predicament was exacerbated by the death of Paul Eyschen on 11 October 1915. Eyschen, who had been prime minister for twenty-seven years, was unrivalled in popularity, and his death plunged Luxembourg deeper into crisis. Eyschen was replaced by Mathias Mongenast, but Mongenast lasted only 25 days before becoming embroiled in a dispute over education and resigning. His next replacement was Hubert Loutsch, who headed up a minority government consisting solely of Catholic conservatives. Grand Duchess Marie-Adélaïde hoped that a successful government would easily win the backing of the electorate, but was mistaken; the government failed to win a majority the following month, coming up short with 25 of 52 seats, and would succumb to a vote of no confidence on 11 January 1916 after two months in office.

== Forming the government ==
In response, the Grand Duchess went in the opposite direction, and, on 24 February, chose Victor Thorn to form a national government. Thorn was an experienced politician in his seventies and was thought to be the most conciliatory candidate. When presenting his credentials before the Chamber of Deputies, Thorn declared, "If you want a government that acts, and is capable of acting, it is imperative that all parties support this government." They did, but only on condition that Thorn formed a grand coalition, offering positions in the cabinet to each party. The make-up of Thorn's first cabinet was:

Name	Party	Office
Victor Thorn	LL	Prime Minister; Minister for Foreign Affairs; Minister for Justice
Michel Welter	POS	Minister for Agriculture; Minister for Commerce; Minister for Industry
Léon Kauffmann	PD	Minister for Finances
Léon Moutrier	LL	Minister for the Interior; Minister for Public Information
Antoine Lefort	PD	Minister for Public Works
Source: Thewes (2003), p. 69

== Governing the country ==
To resolve the food shortage brought about by war and German occupation, Thorn introduced price controls and rationing. However, this resulted only in the creation of a thriving black market, and fomented civil unrest. On 22 December, the Chamber of Deputies passed a motion demanding that Michel Welter, Minister for both Agriculture and Commerce, be fired. Two weeks later, Thorn complied, dismissing Welter and replacing him with Ernest Leclère. Thus, the new cabinet comprised:

Name	Party	Office
Victor Thorn	LL	Prime Minister; Minister for Foreign Affairs; Minister for Justice
Ernest Leclère	POS	Minister for Agriculture; Minister for Commerce; Minister for Industry
Léon Kauffmann	PD	Minister for Finances
Léon Moutrier	LL	Minister for the Interior; Minister for Public Information
Antoine Lefort	PD	Minister for Public Works
Source: Thewes (2003), p. 69

This did little to quell the trouble. Elections in Esch-sur-Alzette in March showed great public support for independent candidates that opposed the National Unity Government. Worse still, a strike by miners in early June was ended only after intervention by the German army. With political support crumbling, threats of civil unrest, and a humiliating reliance upon the occupying forces, Thorn was under immense pressure to resign, which he did on 19 June. The National Unity Government was replaced by a coalition of liberals and conservatives under Léon Kauffmann, but his government also failed to last long.

== See also ==
- Liberation Government (Luxembourg)
- National Union Government (1945)
