= Reuter Ministry =

Government of Luxembourg, 1918–1925

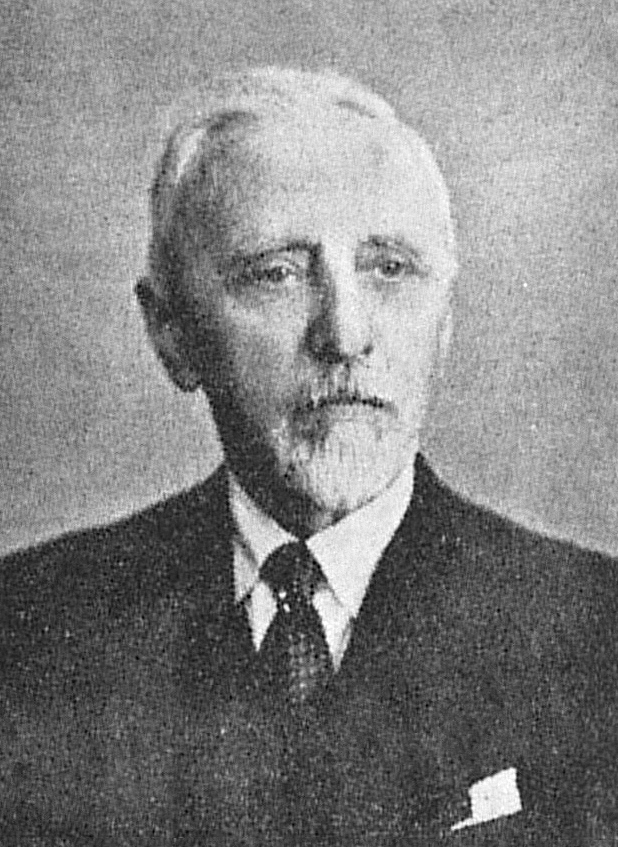
Émile Reuter, the prime minister

The Reuter Ministry was the government in office in Luxembourg from 28 September 1918 until 20 March 1925, headed by Émile Reuter. It resulted from the Chamber elections of 28 July and 4 August 1918 and was reshuffled on 5 January 1920 as a result of the elections of 26 October 1919. There was a further reshuffle on 15 April 1921, when the Liberals left the government.

== Formation ==
On 28 July and 4 August 1918, there were elections for a Chamber of Deputies that was to revise the Constitution. This Constituent Assembly was composed of:

- 23 Deputies of the Party of the Right
- 12 Socialists
- 10 Liberals
- 5 members of the People's Party
- 2 members of the National Party
- 1 independent

After Léon Kauffman's resignation, Émile Reuter formed a government that was a coalition between the four major parties. On 15 May 1919, the Chamber approved the law on the revision of the Constitution. The political stage of the country was to be changed forever by the introduction of universal suffrage for all Luxembourgish citizens, men and women, aged over 21 years; and the introduction of proportional representation. Those eligible to vote went from 14% to 56% of the population. Universal suffrage put a definite end to the regime of the notables who had governed under a system of restricted suffrage, and introduced the era of party politics. The Party of the Right was the winner of the first elections held under the new system, on 26 October 1919. The Catholics received 27 seats, and thus, an absolute majority in the 48-seat Chamber. The socialists received 9 seats, the liberals 7, the National Independent Party 3, the People's Party 2.

This democratisation was to the advantage of the political right wing. This was a country where despite the Industrial Revolution, most of the population was attached to a rural, traditional and conservative mentality. Liberalism, which had dominated the political stage during the 19th century, lost ground. In the Constituent Assembly, the liberals still tried to fight a rear-guard battle, in opposing women's right to vote, as they assumed women would be more likely to vote for conservative parties. This opposition was in vain.

The Party of the Right (and its successor party, the CSV) was to head the government for the rest of the century, with only two exceptions (1925-1926 and 1974-1979).

Taking account of the new majority in the legislature, the ministers Collart, Liesch (liberal) and Welter (independent) tendered their resignations. However, the Grand Duchess and the Prime Minister refused to accept, as they wanted to maintain a national union government. Collart left the government in January 1920, Liesch and Welter in April 1921. From then on, the cabinet consisted only of right-wingers. This was not changed by the partial elections which took place in the constituencies of Centre and Nord on 28 May 1922, even though the liberals improved their results, at the expense of the socialists.

== Foreign policy ==
After the armistice of 11 November 1918, German troops left the country, making way for the Allied armies which passed through Luxembourg to occupy the Rhineland. For six months, Allied forces were stationed in Luxembourg, in order to maintain supply lines. This military presence was to prove a useful instrument for maintaining internal order. During the revolutionary period of January 1919, the government appealed to French troops to re-establish public order.

=== Economic partner ===
Germany's defeat rendered Luxembourg's existing treaties obsolete. Under pressure from the Allies, on 19 December 1918 the Luxembourg government renounced its membership of the Zollverein, and ended German rights to its railways. As Luxembourg was not capable of living in isolation for any length of time, it had to find a new economic partner. Already in 1917, it had formed a commission to study the economic problems caused by the war and its consequences. Representatives of the steel industry and of agriculture had expressed a strong preference for France as an economic partner. Only wine-growers were in favour of partnering with Belgium, where they could sell their products more easily. On 21 February 1919, the Reuter government started simultaneous talks with France and Belgium.

Negotiations with the Belgians were only undertaken with the intention of putting additional pressure on France, as a bargaining tool. However, negotiations with the French did not progress. The Reuter government decided to put the matter to a referendum: the 1919 Luxembourg referendum. It was hoped that the voice of the people would make an impression, at a time when the winners of the war were re-drawing the map of Europe according to principles of Wilsonian self-determination. On 28 September 1919, 73% of Luxembourgish voters declared themselves in favour of an economic union with France.

However, the Luxembourgish government had to wait several more months before the French revealed their game. On 10 May, the French ambassador informed the Luxembourgish government that his country had no intention of forming an economic union, and advised it to turn towards Belgium. Having succeeded in concluding a military pact with Belgium, France had no further need of Luxembourg. Since the beginning of the war, the Belgian authorities had shown annexationist tendencies towards the Grand Duchy. In 1917, France renounced any ambitions with regards to Luxembourg, but kept this secret from the Luxembourgish government, in order to conceal the intentions of the French negotiators. After the war, France intended to take advantage of the Luxembourg question, by persuading Belgium to conclude a military pact. After the French announcement, the Luxembourgish government re-started negotiations with Belgium. These were slow-going, but resulted on 25 July 1921 in the signing of a treaty on a customs and monetary union between the two countries. The Belgium–Luxembourg Economic Union came into force in March 1922. The treaty stipulated the abolition of customs barriers between the two countries, a common external tariff, a common trade policy led by Belgium and a currency association. The Belgian franc became the common currency, while Luxembourg however retained its right to print Luxembourgish notes. The economic union was never a perfect one, as the treaty did not require the harmonisation of tax systems.

=== League of Nations ===
Bound by its neutral status and solidly anchored in the German sphere of influence, Luxembourg had not led a real foreign policy before World War I. The violation of its neutrality in 1914 and the questioning of its independence during 1918-1919 showed the Luxembourgish government that it was necessary to play a role on the international stage. Luxembourg was not invited to the Paris Peace Conference and was not one of the founding members of the League of Nations established by the Treaty of Versailles. From 1919, the Reuter government took steps to have the Grand Duchy admitted to the League of Nations. Luxembourg's unarmed neutrality seemed at first to present an obstacle to its admission, as the League's charter provided for the passage of troops over member states' territory, and the participation in economic and financial sanctions against a hypothetical belligerent. At the same time, the United Kingdom considered the small size of Luxembourg's territory a problem. The Reuter government succeeded in overcoming these objections, partly by hinting at the possibility of a revision of the Luxembourgish Constitution. On 16 December 1920, a session of the League of Nations in Geneva voted unanimously to have Luxembourg admitted. Later, the Luxembourgish government, conscious of the population's attachment to the principle of neutrality, let the constitutional revision drag on; it would never come into force.

== Domestic policy ==
As soon as the occupation had ended, the Reuter government had to face an internal crisis. After the German withdrawal, on 10 and 11 November 1918, a Soviet was formed in Luxembourg City on the same model as the workers' and peasants' councils in Russia. In the Chamber of Deputies, the liberals and socialists demanded an end to the monarchy, accusing the Grand Duchess of intervening in the political arena in a partisan manner, and of having been too close to the German occupiers. Their motion was narrowly rejected.

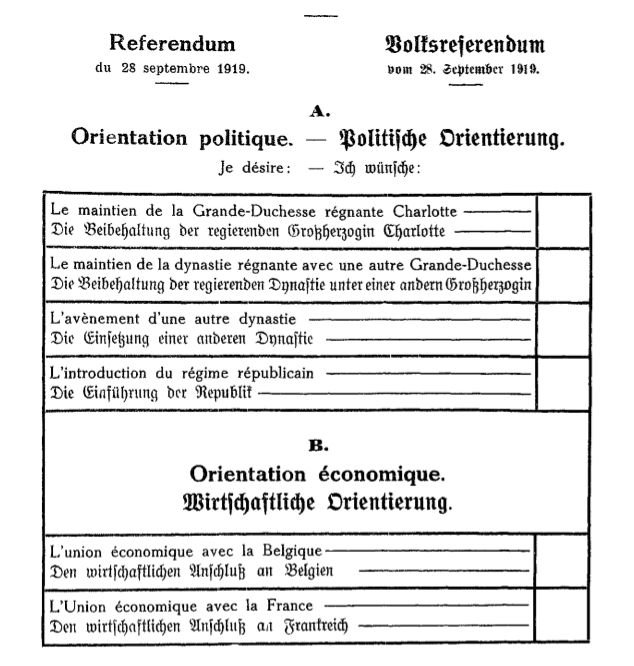
Ballot paper for the 1919 referendum on the monarchy and the choice of economic partner

On the international stage, the government faced hostility towards the Grand Duchess. On 23 December 1918, the French government refused to receive the Luxembourgish ministers in Paris. Émile Reuter, Auguste Liesch and Nicolas Welter returned to Luxembourg with empty hands, where the troubles continued. On 9 January 1919, the Company of Volunteers revolted and a Committee of Public Safety proclaimed a republic. These movements did not attract majority support, and were quickly repressed by the intervention of French troops. But the position of Grand Duchess Marie-Adélaïde was definitively compromised. The ministers convinced her that abdicating in favour of her younger sister Charlotte was the only means of saving the monarchy. On 15 January 1919, the new Grand Duchess swore her oath on the Constitution. The Reuter government had succeeded in managing the crisis. In order to reinforce the legitimacy of Grand Duchess Charlotte, the government decided to have this decision confirmed by the voters. In a referendum on 28 September 1919, Luxembourgers were invited to express their wishes on the economic future of the country, the political regime (monarchy vs republic), and Grand Duchess personally. A large majority (80%) pronounced themselves in favour of maintaining the monarchy, which could now rely on both constitutional and democratic legitimacy.

== Social policy ==
The development of mass trade unions, and the short-lived creation of a Soviet after the war, revealed a profound disquiet in Luxembourgish society. From 1914 to 1920, purchasing power shrank by 300%. It was essentially the workforce – workers, private employees, or civil servants – that were suffering from the price rises and food shortages. In order to defuse a possibly explosive situation in society, the Reuter government took the path of concessions. Its social policy was inspired by German legislation. Taking its lead from the demands of the workers' movement, it introduced the 8-hour working day without a reduction in pay, from 14 December 1918. On 26 April 1919, the government enacted the creation of factory councils in industrial companies with over 50 workers. This organ of conciliation allowed the workers' representatives to negotiate improvements in their pay and working conditions. Torn between the conflicting interests of employers and employees, the government then started to backtrack. Consequently, after a large protest, it extended factory councils to all establishments with at least 15 workers.

Despite these measures, a crisis erupted in 1921. Reacting to massive lay-offs and pay cuts in the steel industry, the mine- and metalworkers' union (BMIAV) started a prolonged strike. The government initially refrained from intervening in the labour dispute. However, the strike movement started to take on revolutionary characteristics. On 1 March, the strikers occupied the factory in Differdange. Giving way to the fears of business-owners and under pressure from the French and Belgian ambassadors, Émile Reuter abolished the factory councils by decree of 11 March 1921. The government appealed for French troops to intervene, who managed to establish order in the mining area alongside Luxembourgish gendarmes and soldiers from the Company of Volunteers. The steelworkers' strike also failed because it was not able to mobilise workers in other industries.

After the war, the government gave private employees, civil servants, and railway workers a significant improvement in their working conditions. The law of 31 October 1919 gave private employees several advantages which distinguished them from manual workers: separate delegations, the 8-hour day, annual paid leave of 10 to 20 days dependent on length of service, and measures that gave security of employment. The Grand Ducal decree of 14 May 1921 gave railway workers a status similar to that of civil servants, especially with regards to pensions and security of employment. The civil servants, for their part, had their pay indexed with inflation. Drawing lessons from the strike, the government put in place various organs for discussion and consensus. The law of 4 April 1924 created five professional chambers: the Chamber of Commerce, the Chamber of Artisans, the Chamber of Work, the Chamber of Private Employees, and the Chamber of Agriculture.

== Economic policy ==
=== Currency ===
Luxembourg's exit from the customs union with Germany brought about a profound restructuring of the Luxembourgish economy, especially with regards to currency. Until 1918, it was mostly German money that circulated in Luxembourg, while Luxembourgish francs only played a small role. The government took advantage of its exit from the Zollverein to create a proper national currency, a symbol of its sovereignty. A decree of 11 December 1918 regulated the exchange of the 200 million German marks in circulation, for Luxembourgish francs. This transaction brought about several logistical problems. The printing of new notes did not proceed fast enough, and the exchange rate of 1,25 was considered by some as an unjustified generosity towards investors by the state. The new franc was not backed by any gold reserves, and had no value abroad. The government also had the intention of creating a monetary union with Luxembourg's new economic partner. This partner's currency would be legal tender in the Grand Duchy. The question of currency occupied a central place in the negotiations which led to the Belgium–Luxembourg Economic Union. In 1921, the Grand Duchy borrowed 175 million Belgian francs.

=== Steel industry ===
The economic reorientation after the war affected the steel industry above all, in which French and Belgian capital now replaced German investors. German-owned factories were acquired by Franco-Belgo-Luxembourgish consortiums. Two new companies were created, Hadir and the "Société métallurgique des Terres rouges". The government barely intervened in the industrial restructuring, which was driven by the great captains of the steel-working industry such as Émile Mayrisch or Gaston Barbanson.

=== Railways ===
After the war, Luxembourgish railways also changed hands. After the armistice, French military authorities occupied the main network. The lines of Guillaume-Luxembourg were exploited for the benefit of the French state, as were the Chemins de fer d’Alsace et de Lorraine. On 19 December 1918, the Luxembourgish government withdrew from its railway treaty with Germany. However, Belgium was also interested in making use of the main Luxembourgish network. France agreed to withdraw if the Belgian and Luxembourgish governments reached an agreement, but continued to exploit Guillaume-Luxembourg in the meantime. The BLEU treaty stipulated that the question of railways be dealt with. In May 1924, Reuter signed a treaty with Belgium which required the unification of the Guillaume-Luxembourg and Prince-Henri networks under a Board of Directors where Belgian representatives would have a majority. On 20 January 1925, the Chamber of Deputies, moved by anti-Belgian feelings, rejected the treaty, provoking a government crisis. ARBED, which feared the influence of the Société Générale de Belgique on Luxembourgish railways, had also opposed the government's plans.

== Composition ==
=== 28 September 1918 to 5 January 1920 ===
- Émile Reuter: Minister of State, head of government, Director-General for Foreign Affairs and the Interior
- Nicolas Welter: Director-General for Education
- Auguste Liesch: Director-General for Justice and Public Works
- Alphonse Neyens: Director-General for Finance
- Eugène Auguste Collart: Director-General for Agriculture, Industry and Labor

=== 5 January 1920 to 15 April 1921 ===
- Émile Reuter (Right Party): Minister of State, head of government, Director-General for Foreign Affairs and the Interior
- Nicolas Welter: Director-General for Education and Public Works
- Alphonse Neyens (Right): Director-General for Finance
- Raymond de Waha (Right): Director-General for Agriculture and Social Security
- Antoine Pescatore (Liberals): Director-General for Trade, Industry and Labor

=== 15 April 1921 to 20 March 1925 ===
- Émile Reuter (Right): Minister of State, head of government, Director-General for Foreign Affairs
- Alphonse Neyens (Right): Director-General for Finance
- Raymond de Waha (Right): Director-General for Agriculture, Industry and Social Security
- Guillaume Leidenbach (Right): Director-General for Justice and Public Works (resigned on 14 March 1923; Guillaume Soisson was appointed Director-General for Public Works)
- Joseph Bech (Right): Director-General for the Interior and Education

== References and further reading ==
- Beck, Simone (2019). "Le référendum de 1919 – un iceberg?" (PDF). Ons Stad (in French) (120): 42–45.
- Thewes, Guy (2011). Les gouvernements du Grand-Duché de Luxembourg depuis 1848 (PDF) (in French). Service Information et Presse. pp. 76–87. ISBN 978-2-87999-212-9. Archived from the original (PDF) on 2017-01-11.
