= Nik Welter =

Luxembourgish writer (1871–1951)

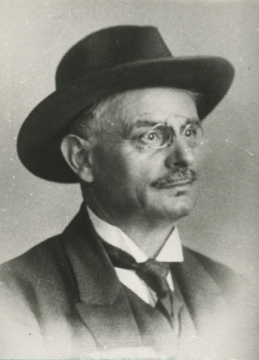

Minister of Education
- In office 28 September 1918 – 15 April 1921
- Monarchs: Marie-Adélaïde; Charlotte
- Prime Minister: Émile Reuter
- Preceded by: Léon Moutrier
- Succeeded by: Joseph Bech

Personal details
- Born: 2 January 1871 Mersch, Luxembourg
- Died: 13 July 1951 (aged 80) Luxembourg, Luxembourg
- Party: Independent

Nikolaus “Nik” Welter (2 January 1871 – 13 July 1951) was a Luxembourgish writer, playwright, poet, professor, literary critic (Germanic and Romance languages), and statesman. He wrote predominantly in German. He also served as a Minister for Education in the government of Émile Reuter.

After his university studies in Leuven, Paris, Bonn and Berlin, he became a teacher in Diekirch (1897-1906) and later at the Athénée de Luxembourg in Luxembourg City (1906-1918).

Welter mainly wrote plays and poetry. His work Griselinde (1901) inspired the Luxembourgish composer Alfred Kowalsky to write the opera of the same name. Other well-known works are Die Söhne des Öslings, Goethes Husar, Der Abtrünnige, Professor Forster and Lene Frank.

From early on, Nik Welter was involved with the Félibrige, a poets' movement in the Provence, and was in contact with the members of the Felibertum félibrige: Frédéric Mistral, Joseph Roumanille and Théodore Aubanel. He was often at Mistral's house in Bouches-du-Rhône and was taken up into the circle of the Féliber. In the same way, he also met German Romanists such as Eduard Koschwitz and August Bertuch. Along with the two German Romanists, he campaigned successfully for Frédéric Mistral to be awarded the 1904 Nobel Prize for Literature.

Nik Welter recorded his travels in the Provence and in Tunisia in the book Hohe Sonnentage. In his book Im Werden und Wachsen, he wrote about his childhood in Mersch. He was the author of the first Luxembourgish schoolbook Das Luxemburgische und sein Schrifttum.

== Life ==
Welter studied at the Universities of Leuven, Paris, Bonn and Berlin . He then went to the teaching profession and was a teacher in Diekirch and later at the Athénée de Luxembourg. During the government of Émile Reuter, Welter was the Minister of Education from 1918-1921. He belonged to no party. As an author, Welter wrote plays and poetry, as well as commissioned works such as 1909's "history of French literature" on behalf of the University of Marburg .

== Work ==
Welter wrote almost exclusively in the German language. His drama Griselinde (1901) served the Luxembourg composer Alfred Kowalsky as libretto for his opera of the same name. Around the turn of the century, Welter's interest was in themes from Luxembourgish mythology and history, but also especially literature in the French minority language "langue d'oc" (Provencal), which had been reinvigorated by the Félibrige school. He corresponded with famous German Romanist as Eduard Koschwitz and August Bertuch and traveled twice to Maillane ( Bouches-du-Rhône) to Frédéric Mistral (Mistral Frederi), the "chef de file" of this movement. As one of the German Romanists, he was not indifferent to the efforts that the award of the 1904 Nobel Prize in Literature led to Mistral. In reported Welter in his travelogue "Hohesonne days. A holiday book from Provence and Tunisia "(1912).

== Honours ==
- 1937: Joseph-von-Görres Prize
- 1951: Grand Officer of the Order of the Oak Crown

== Works ==
=== As author ===
==== Autobiographical ====
- Im Dienste. Erinnerungen aus verworrener Zeit (1925)
- Im Werden und Wachsen: aus dem Leben eines armen Dorfjungen (1926)
- Freundschaft und Geleit. Erinnerungen (1936)

==== Poetry ====
- Frühlichter. Gedichte (1903)
- Aus alten Tagen. Balladen und Romanzen aus Luxemburgs Sage und Geschichte (1900)
- In Staub und Gluten. Neue Gedichte (1909)
- Hochofen. Ein Büchlein Psalmen (1913)
- Über den Kämpfen. Zeitgedichte eines Neutralen (1915)
- Mariensommer. Ein Büchlein Lieder (ca. 1929-30)

==== Non-fiction ====
- Die Dichter der luxemburgischen Mundart. Literarische Unterhaltungen (1906)
- Hohe Sonnentage. Ein Ferienbuch aus der Provence und Tunesien (1912)
- Frederi Mistral. Der Dichter der Provence (1899)
- Theodor Aubanel. Ein provenzalischer Sänger der Schönheit (1902)
- Das Luxemburgische und sein Schrifttum (1914)
- Mundartliche und hochdeutsche Dichtung in Luxemburg. Ein Beitrag zur Geistes- und Kulturgeschichte des Großherzogtums (1929)

==== Plays ====
- Siegfried und Melusina. Dramatisierte Volkssagein drei Abtheilungen (1900)
- Die Söhne des Öslings. Ein Bauerndrama aus der Zeit der französischen Revolution in fünf Aufzügen (1904)
- Der Abtrünnige. Eine Komödie der Treue (1905)
- Prof. Forster. Ein Trauerspiel in fünf Aufzügen (1908)
- Lene Frank. Ein Lehrerinnendrama in 4 Aufzügen (1906)
- Mansfeld. Ein Schicksalsspiel in vier Akten (1912)
- Dantes Kaiser. Geschichtliches Charakterspiel in fünf Aufzügen (1922)
- Griselinde. Oper in drei Aufzügen und vier Bildern (1918; music by Alfred Kowalsky)
- Grossmama. Die Tragödie einer Seele in einem Aufzuge (1931)
- Die Braut. Ein geschichtliches Spiel in drei Aufzügen (1931)
- Goethes Husar. Aus seinem Leben. Dichtung und Wahrheit in drei Aufzügen (1932)

==== Collected works ====
- Gesammelte Werke. Westermann Verlag, Braunschweig 1925/26 (5 volumes).

=== As editor ===
- Franz Bergg (1866-1913). Ein Proletarierleben. Frankfurt-am-Main: Neuer Frankfurter Verlag, 1913
- Michel Rodange: Dem Grow Sigfrid seng Goldkuommer. Komëdesteck a fünf Acten (1929)
