= Kauffman Ministry =

Government of Luxembourg, 1917–1918

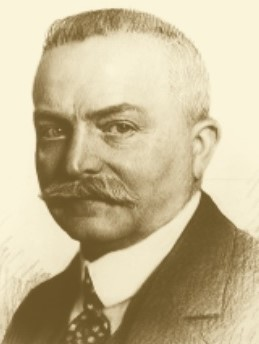
Léon Kauffman, prime minister 1917-1918

The Kauffman Ministry was in office in Luxembourg from 19 June 1917 to 28 September 1918.

Léon Kauffman, a member of the Party of the Right, was able to form a coalition government with the liberals on 19 June 1917. This was the first time that a Prime Minister from the Party of the Right was in office. One of the government's tasks was to reform the Constitution of Luxembourg, to make it more democratic. In November 1917, the Chamber of Deputies began debating the introduction of universal suffrage. There was particularly drawn-out discussion on articles 32 (origin of sovereign power), 37 (conclusion of secret treaties), 52 (universal suffrage, women's right to vote, proportional representation) and 75 (Deputies' salaries) of the Constitution. There was a crisis when the government clashed with the Chamber and refused to revise article 32. The government was unwilling (as the Chamber wanted) to risk offending the Grand Duchess by defining sovereignty as residing in the nation, rather than in the monarch. The government also became discredited by its relations with the German occupiers -- it became known that on 16 August, the prime minister had been present at a private visit by the German chancellor Georg von Hertling to the Grand Duchess. On 28 September 1918, the Kauffman Ministry was succeeded by a new government under Émile Reuter.

== Composition ==
- Léon Kauffman: Minister of State, head of government, Director-General of Foreign Affairs, Culture and Finances
- Léon Moutrier: Director-General of Justice and public education
- Antoine Lefort: Director-General for Public Works
- Joseph Faber: Director-General of Agriculture, Trade, Industry and Labor
- Maurice Kohn: Director-General for the Interior
