= Joseph Kaufman =

Joseph or Joe Kaufman, Kauffman, Kauffmann, or Kaufmann could refer to:

- Joseph Kaufman (director) (1882–1918), American film director and actor
- Joseph Kaufman (producer) (1911–1961), or Joe Kaufmann, American film producer
- Joe Kaufman, 2024 Republican candidate in Florida's 23rd congressional district
- Joseph Kaufmann, lead actor in the films Jud (1971) and Heavy Traffic (1973)
- Joseph Kauffman, member of the Council of State of Luxembourg 1961–1979
