= Loutsch Ministry =

Luxembourgish government ministry

The Loutsch Ministry was in office in Luxembourg from 6 November 1915 to 24 February 1916.

When the government of Mathias Mongenast resigned, Grand Duchess Marie-Adélaïde appointed a new government headed by Hubert Loutsch, composed entirely of members of the Party of the Right. While the political and economic situation became more and more tense, and required radical government measures, the Loutsch government did not possess a majority in the Chamber of Deputies, with 20 Deputies on the right compared with 32 Deputies on the left. To break the deadlock, the Grand Duchess decided to dissolve the Chamber and call new elections on 23 December 1915. This act by the Grand Duchess was allowed under the Constitution, but was regarded as highly unconventional, and provoked an outcry from the Deputies on the left. The socialists and liberals in parliament never forgave Marie-Adélaïde for the dissolution, which they saw as a coup d'état.

In the ensuing elections of 23 December, the political right gained seats but still did not achieve a majority (25 Deputies on the right, versus 27 on the left). On 11 January 1916, the Loutsch government lost a confidence vote, and was forced to resign.

== Composition ==
- Hubert Loutsch: Minister of State, head of government, General-Director for Foreign Affairs
- Guillaume Soisson: General-Director for Public Works and Agriculture
- Edmond Reiffers: General-Director for Finance and Public Education
- Jean-Baptiste Sax: General-Director for Justice and the Interior
