= Marie-Adélaïde, Grand Duchess of Luxembourg =

Grand Duchess of Luxembourg from 1912 to 1919

Marie-Adélaïde
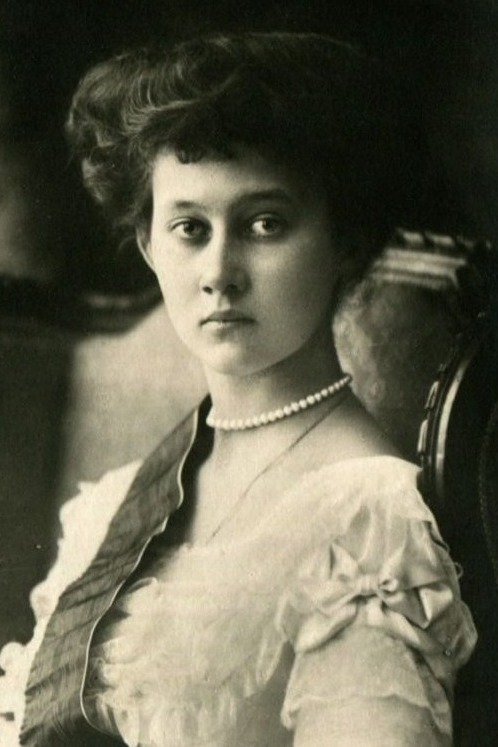
- Formal portrait, 1910s

Grand Duchess of Luxembourg
- Reign: 25 February 1912 – 14 January 1919
- Predecessor: William IV
- Successor: Charlotte
- Regent: Marie Anne (1912)
- Born: 14 June 1894; Berg Castle, Colmar-Berg, Luxembourg
- Died: 24 January 1924 (aged 29); Schloss Hohenburg, Bavaria, Germany
- Burial: Notre-Dame Cathedral, Luxembourg
Names
- Marie-Adélaïde Thérèse Hilda Wilhelmine
- House: Nassau-Weilburg
- Father: William IV
- Mother: Marie Anne of Portugal
- Religion: Catholicism

Marie-Adélaïde (French: Marie-Adélaïde Thérèse Hilda Wilhelmine, Luxembourgish: Marie-Adelheid; 14 June 1894 – 24 January 1924), was Grand Duchess of Luxembourg from 1912 until her abdication in 1919. She was the first Grand Duchess regnant of Luxembourg (after five grand dukes), its first female monarch since Duchess Maria Theresa (1740–1780, who was also an Austrian archduchess and Holy Roman Empress) and the first Luxembourgish monarch to be born within the territory since Count John the Blind (1296–1346).

Named as heiress presumptive by her father Grand Duke William IV in 1907 to prevent a succession crisis due to his lack of a son, Marie-Adélaïde became Grand Duchess aged 17 upon his death in 1912. She ruled through the First World War, and her perceived support for the German occupation forces led to great unpopularity in Luxembourg as well as neighbouring France and Belgium. On the advice of Parliament and under enormous pressure from the Luxembourgish people, she abdicated on 14 January 1919 in favour of her younger sister Charlotte, who managed to save the monarchy and the dynasty in a national referendum later that year.

Following her abdication, Marie-Adélaïde retired to a convent in Italy, before leaving due to ill health. She died of influenza in Germany on 24 January 1924, at the age of 29.

== Early years ==
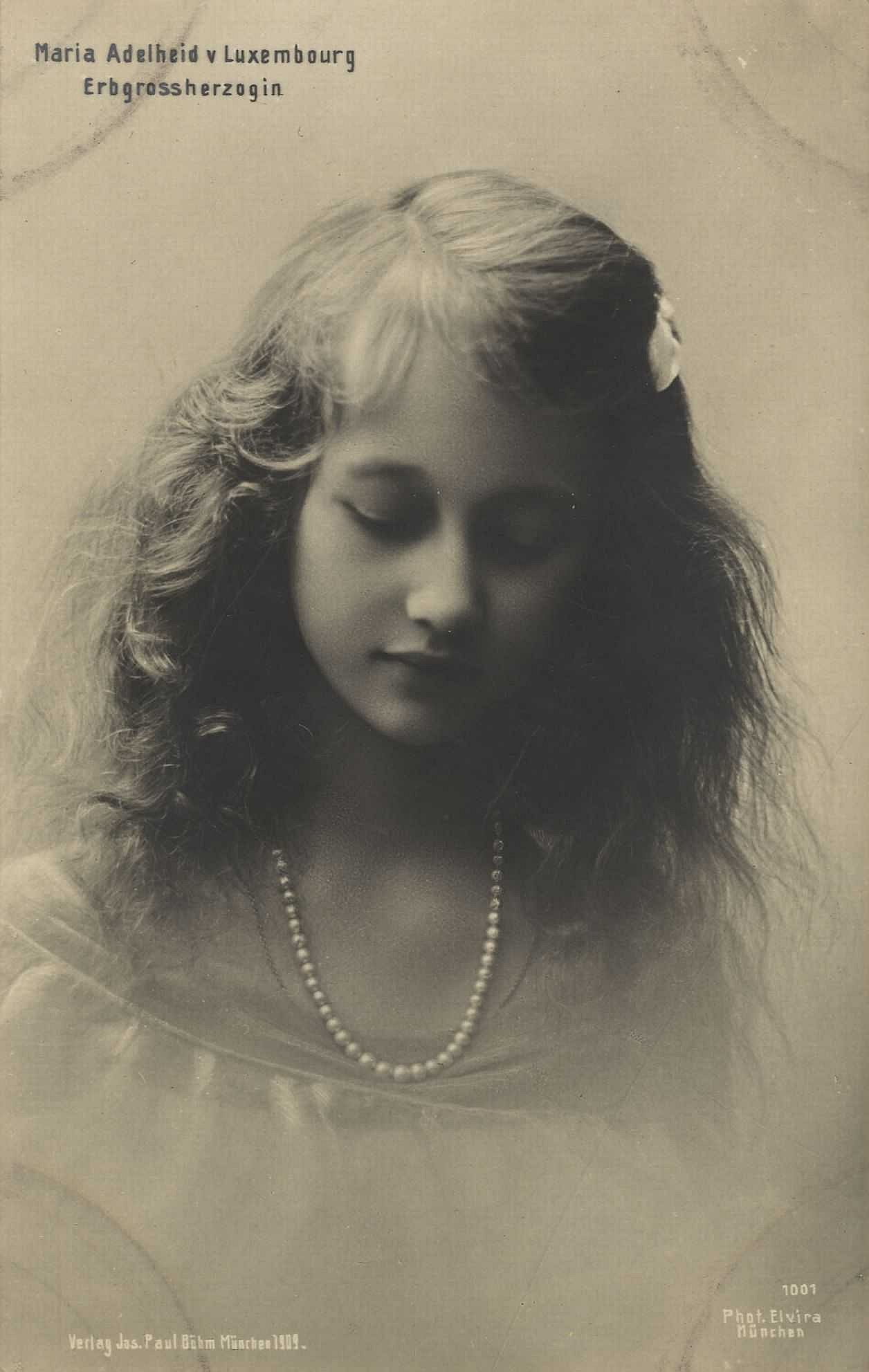
Princess Marie-Adélaïde (1909)

Marie-Adélaïde was born on 14 June 1894 at Berg Castle, the eldest child of Grand Duke William IV and his wife, Infanta Marie Anne of Portugal.

Since her father had six daughters and no sons, he proclaimed Marie-Adélaïde as the heir presumptive on 10 July 1907, in order to solve any succession crisis due to the use of Salic law in the monarchy.

Due to that same Salic Law, the elder branch of the House of Nassau, called Nassau-Weilburg (present-day Luxembourg-Nassau) inherited in 1890 the throne of Luxembourg from the younger branch called Nassau-Orange, which was not only supplying the grand dukes of Luxembourg from 1815 to 1890, but was also, through a personal union, the reigning dynasty of the Kingdom of the Netherlands.

Thus, when her father died on 25 February 1912, she succeeded to the throne at the age of 17, becoming the first reigning Grand Duchess of Luxembourg. Her mother served as regent until Marie-Adélaïde's eighteenth birthday on 18 June 1912, when the President of the Chamber Auguste Laval swore her in as the first Luxembourgish monarch to be born in the territory since John the Blind (1296–1346) . Laval's speech to the Chamber of Deputies (parliament) during the ceremony was:

Consider it, gentlemen, as a happy moment for the future of the country, the fact that the Grand Duchess Marie-Adélaïde is the first of our sovereigns to have been born on the Grand Ducal soil, the first to have been raised there, and who, from her earliest childhood has breathed the air of our native land and learnt the ideas, the aspirations and the traditions of the people to whom she has been called reign over.

Marie-Adélaïde's own speech at the ceremony was:

It is my desire to judge according to the requirements of justice and equity which will inspire all of my acts. The law and general interest will only guide me. Judging fairly: it is not merely equal justice for all, but a protective justice for the poor and weak. The growing economic inequality between men is the greatest worry of our age. Social peace, no matter how ardently desired, remains to this day an elusive ideal. Is it not necessary to work on reconciliation and solidarity?

== Reign ==
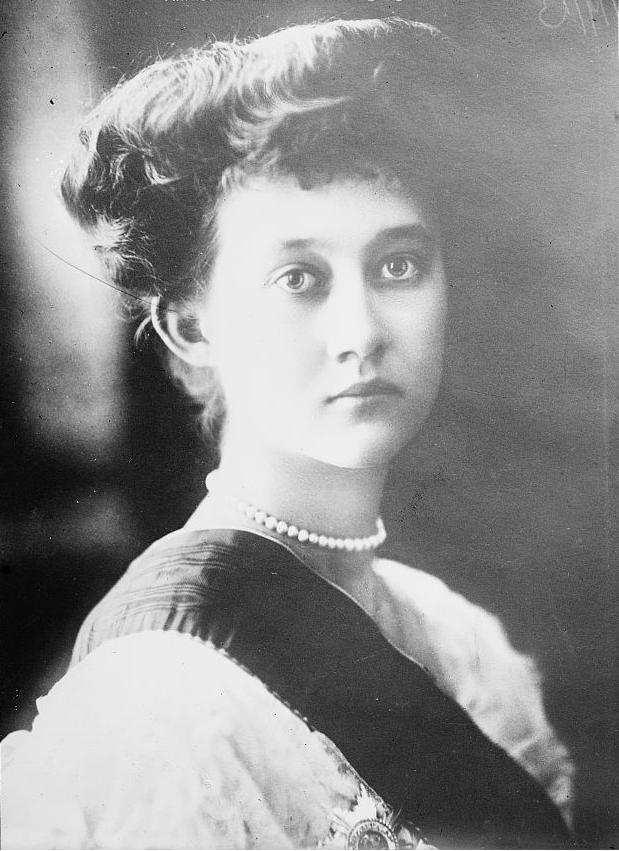
Marie-Adélaïde in c. 1913

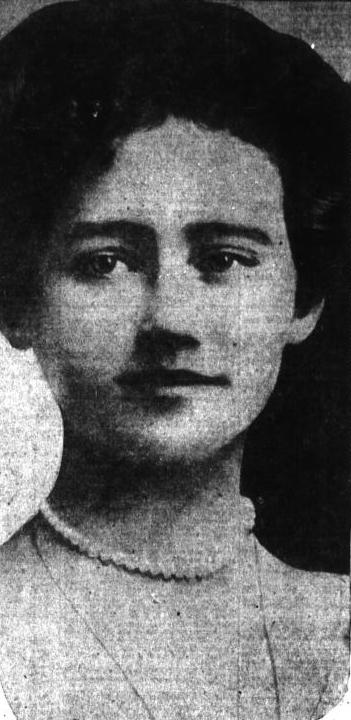
Marie-Adélaïde in 1917

At the time, the Luxembourgish Constitution granted the monarch extensive political powers. However, while her father and grandfather had largely stayed out of direct involvement in governance, Marie-Adélaïde was deeply interested in politics and took an active part in the government and the political life of the Grand Duchy. She was a devout Catholic, with strong religious convictions and very conservative political views. On the day of her accession to the throne – 25 February 1912 – she refused to sign a new law reducing the role of Catholic priests within the education system. Later, in 1915, she hesitated before appointing the mayors of Differdange and Hollerich, both known for their anticlerical views.

With the outbreak of World War I, Luxembourg found itself in a dangerous position, unable to defend itself from German invasion because of its neutral status [see Treaty of London (1867)]. When Germany violated Luxembourg's neutrality on 2nd August, on the pretext of safeguarding the railroads, Marie Adelaide and her government responded with formal protests. However, these protests proved ineffective in halting the subsequent military occupation of the country.

Marie-Adélaïde and the government refrained from further opposing the German invasion, which spared the population of the Grand Duchy from military conflict on its soil, and resulted in the Germans leaving the Luxembourgish state intact during the occupation. During the war, Marie-Adélaïde, her sisters and their mother were personally involved in the work of the Red Cross in Luxembourg, and cared for both German and French soldiers.

Political conflict in Luxembourg, however, continued. Diane Mozcar writes:

The increasingly hostile leftists within Luxembourg seized on every excuse to discredit their royal opponent. Marie Adelaide was of German blood; she had agreed to her sister’s betrothal to a German prince; she went to the funeral of an elderly relative in Germany; she had received the Kaiser in her palace (she had, in fact, only learned of his proposed visit when he was already on his way), and apparently agreed, on the advice of her prime minister and against her better judgment, to receive the German commander when he entered the country.

Meanwhile, in late 1915 the Grand Duchess caused controversy by dissolving the Chamber of Deputies to solve the deadlock faced by the Loutsch Ministry, which was composed of Party of the Right members and did not have a majority in the Chamber. Marie-Adélaïde ordered the Chamber dissolved and new elections held on 23 December 1915. This action was permissible under the Constitution, but regarded as unconventional, and provoked an outcry and long-term resentment among the socialists and liberals in parliament, who saw it as resembling a coup d'état.

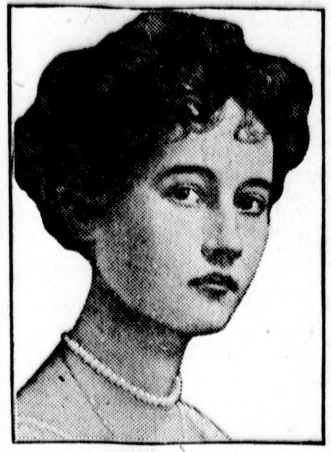
Marie-Adélaïde in 1919

After the end of the war, Luxembourg was harshly criticised by the Entente for its attitude, and the perception of the Grand Duchess as pro-German led the French government to declare: "The French Government does not consider it possible to have contact or negotiations with the Government of the Grand Duchess of Luxembourg, whom it considers as gravely compromised …," and French Minister Raymond Poincaré claimed the following about the Grand Duchy: "This country has not done its duty and does not deserve to be maintained in its present state."

Although she had not done anything in contradiction with the Luxembourgish Constitution of 1868, voices in Parliament began to demand her abdication in January 1919. However, leftists wanted to do away with the monarchy in its entirety. Furthermore, Belgium sought to annex Luxembourg, a plan that was even supported by some of Marie-Adélaïde's political opponents at home.

On 9 January, a group of Socialist and Liberal Luxembourgish Members of Parliament ("Deputies") publicly proclaimed a republic after losing a vote in parliament to abolish the monarchy, a situation which was followed by public unrest in the streets requiring even the intervention of the French Army to restore order. Under intense national (and international) pressure, and after consulting with the Prime Minister, the 24-year-old Grand Duchess abdicated on 14 January 1919. She was succeeded by her younger sister, Princess Charlotte. The constitution was also revised. Diane Mozcar writes that "Charlotte and her successors, however, were not to wield the political power and authority previously accorded to the sovereign by the constitution."

=== Governments ===
Marie-Adélaïde's reign saw the following Prime Ministers and Governments:

- Paul Eyschen (Eyschen Ministry)
- Mathias Mongenast (Mongenast Ministry)
- Hubert Loutsch (Loutsch Ministry)
- Victor Thorn (National Union Government)
- Léon Kauffman (Kauffman Ministry)
- Émile Reuter (Reuter Ministry)

== Post-abdication and death ==
After her abdication, Marie-Adélaïde went into exile by travelling through Europe. She entered a Carmelite convent in Modena, Italy, in 1920. Later, she joined the Little Sisters of the Poor in Rome, taking the name "Sister Marie of the Poor". Her worsening health did not allow her to remain a nun, however, and she eventually had to leave the convent. She then moved to Schloss Hohenburg in Bavaria, where, surrounded by her family, she died of influenza aged 29 on 24 January 1924. She had not married or had children. On 22 October 1947, her body was interred in the Grand Ducal Crypt of the Notre-Dame Cathedral in Luxembourg City.

== See also ==
- German occupation of Luxembourg in World War I

Marie-Adélaïde, Grand Duchess of Luxembourg House of Nassau-Weilburg Cadet branch of the House of Nassau Born: 14 June 1894 Died: 24 January 1924
Regnal titles
Preceded by William IV	Grand Duchess of Luxembourg; 1912–1919	Succeeded by Charlotte
Titles in pretence
Preceded by William IV of Luxembourg	— TITULAR — Duchess of Nassau; 1912–1919; Reason for succession failure: Prussian annexation of Nassau in 1866	Succeeded by Charlotte
