= List of ministers for public works of Luxembourg =

The minister for public works (Luxembourgish: Minister fir ëffentlech Aarbechten; French: ministre des travaux publics) was a position in the Luxembourgian cabinet. It was replaced by the position of Minister for Sustainable Development and Infrastructure on 23 June 2009, having previously existed since the first cabinet of Luxembourg, back in 1848, with the exception of some intermittent spells in the nineteenth century.

From 24 March 1936, the title of Minister for Public Works was an official one, although the position had been unofficially known by that name since its creation. From the position's creation until 28 November 1857, the Minister went by the title of Administrator-General. From 1857 until 1936, the Minister went by the title of Director-General.

== List of ministers for public works ==
Minister	Party	Start date	End date	Prime Minister
Jean-Pierre André	None	1 August 1848	2 December 1848	G T I de la Fontaine
Mathias Ulrich	None	2 December 1848	23 September 1853	Jean-Jacques Willmar
Mathias Wellenstein	None	23 September 1853	23 September 1854	Charles-Mathias Simons
No minister				Charles-Mathias Simons
Paul de Scherff	None	24 May 1856	2 June 1857	Charles-Mathias Simons
Guillaume-Mathias Augustin	None	2 June 1857	29 November 1857	Charles-Mathias Simons
No minister				Charles-Mathias Simons
Baron de Tornaco	None	26 September 1860	31 March 1864	Baron de Tornaco
Ernest Simons	None	31 March 1864	26 January 1866	Baron de Tornaco
No minister				Baron de Tornaco
No minister				Emmanuel Servais
Victor de Roebé	None	26 December 1874	6 August 1878	Baron de Blochausen
No minister				Baron de Blochausen
No minister			Édouard Thilges	
Victor Thorn (first time)	None	22 September 1888	26 October 1892	Paul Eyschen
Paul Eyschen	None	26 October 1892	23 June 1896	Paul Eyschen
Charles Rischard	None	23 June 1896	25 October 1905	Paul Eyschen
Charles de Waha	None	25 October 1905	3 March 1915	Paul Eyschen
Victor Thorn (second time)	None	3 March 1915	6 November 1915	Mathias Mongenast
Guillaume Soisson (first time)	PD	6 November 1915	24 February 1916	Hubert Loutsch
Antoine Lefort	PD	24 February 1916	19 June 1917	Victor Thorn
Antoine Lefort	PD	19 June 1917	28 September 1918	Léon Kauffman
Auguste Liesch	LL	28 September 1918	15 April 1921	Émile Reuter
Guillaume Leidenbach	PD	15 April 1921	14 April 1923	Émile Reuter
Guillaume Soisson (second time)	PD	14 April 1923	20 March 1925	Émile Reuter
Norbert Dumont	LL	20 March 1925	16 July 1926	Pierre Prüm
Albert Clemang	PRS	16 July 1926	11 April 1932	Joseph Bech
Étienne Schmit	PRL	11 April 1932	5 November 1937	Joseph Bech
René Blum	POS	5 November 1937	6 April 1940	Pierre Dupong
Victor Bodson (first time)	LSAP	6 April 1940	1 March 1947	Pierre Dupong
Robert Schaffner (first time)	GD	1 March 1947	3 July 1951	Pierre Dupong
Victor Bodson (second time)	LSAP	3 July 1951	29 December 1953	Pierre Dupong
Victor Bodson (second time)	LSAP	29 December 1953	29 March 1958	Joseph Bech
Victor Bodson (second time)	LSAP	29 March 1958	2 March 1959	Pierre Frieden
Robert Schaffner (second time)	DP	2 March 1959	15 July 1964	Pierre Werner
Albert Bousser	LSAP	15 July 1964	6 February 1969	Pierre Werner
Jean-Pierre Büchler	CSV	6 February 1969	15 June 1974	Pierre Werner
Jean Hamilius	DP	15 June 1974	16 July 1979	Gaston Thorn
René Konen	DP	16 July 1979	20 July 1984	Pierre Werner
Marcel Schlechter	LSAP	20 July 1984	14 July 1989	Jacques Santer
Robert Goebbels	LSAP	14 July 1989	16 January 1995	Jacques Santer
Robert Goebbels	LSAP	16 January 1995	7 August 1999	Jean-Claude Juncker
Erna Hennicot-Schoepges	CSV	7 August 1999	31 July 2004	Jean-Claude Juncker
Claude Wiseler	CSV	31 July 2004	23 July 2009	Jean-Claude Juncker
