= Michel Welter =

Luxembourgish politician (1859–1924)

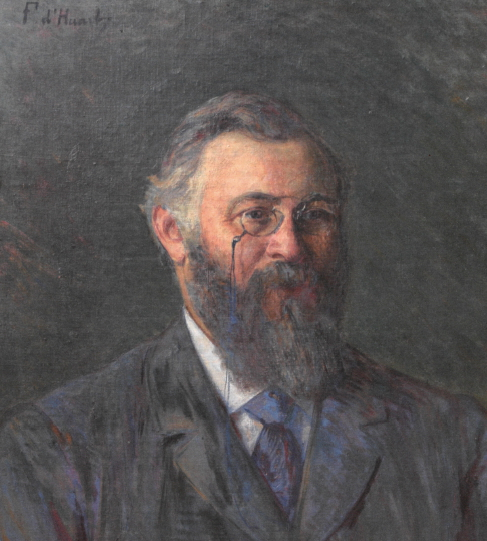
- Painting by Ferdinand d'Huart

Director-General for Agriculture, Commerce, and Industry
- In office 24 February 1916 – 3 January 1917
- Prime Minister: Victor Thorn
- Preceded by: position established
- Succeeded by: Ernest Leclère

Personal details
- Born: March 21, 1859 Heiderscheid, Luxembourg
- Died: April 22, 1924 (aged 65) Luxembourg
- Party: Luxembourg Socialist Workers' Party
- Occupation: Physician, journalist, politician

Dr. Michel Welter (21 March 1859 in Heiderscheid – 22 April 1924) was a Luxembourgish politician and former leader of the Socialist Party. A member of Luxembourg's Chamber of Deputies, he served as the Director-General for Agriculture, Commerce, and Industry from 24 February 1916 until 3 January 1917, during the German occupation.

He was one of the fiercest defenders of Victor Thorn's National Union Government. Poorly implemented policies designed to avoid a food shortage back-fired, and the country only narrowly averted a famine. Welter, as the minister responsible for both agriculture and commerce, was held responsible; on 22 December, Welter was censured by the Chamber of Deputies. Although Thorn sought to avoid firing Welter, he was left with no choice, and replaced him with Ernest Leclère.

Born on 21 March 1859 in Heiderscheid to a family of modest means, he studied at several European universities, before settling in Esch-Alzette as a doctor. His work as a physician brought him into contact with the miners and railway workers there, and it was their poor living and working conditions which drove him to take up politics. He campaigned for women's right to vote, paid holidays, social security and decent housing for workers.

In 1896 he was elected to the Chamber of Deputies for the first time, where his social campaigning soon earned him the nickname "de rouden Dokter" (= "the red doctor"). Yet Welter, seen as a radical by the middle-class Deputies, was criticised by the workers for his own middle-class background.

In 1902, Welter moved to Luxembourg city, where he co-founded the Social-Democratic Party. He was Luxembourg's delegate at the Second International and came into contact with Jean Jaurès, Clara Zetkin and August Bebel.

From 1896 to 1897 he wrote for the Escher Courrier, then for the Patriot, the Escher Volksblatt, the Escher Journal, and the Frankfurter Zeitung. From 1913 to 1916 he edited the Tageblatt. Throughout his career, he got into several fights with the conservative Luxemburger Wort.

In the debate over the Education Law of 1912 he campaigned for a strict separation of church and state. In 1916 he was appointed to the Thorn government, as minister for agriculture, commerce, and industry. His time as a member of the government was brief and difficult. He was accused of having made an agreement with the German occupiers to allow the import of badly needed food supplies into Luxembourg. Such an agreement was impossible due to Luxembourg's neutral status. He was dismissed from the government on 2 January 1917 and became director of the medical section of the spa in Mondorf.

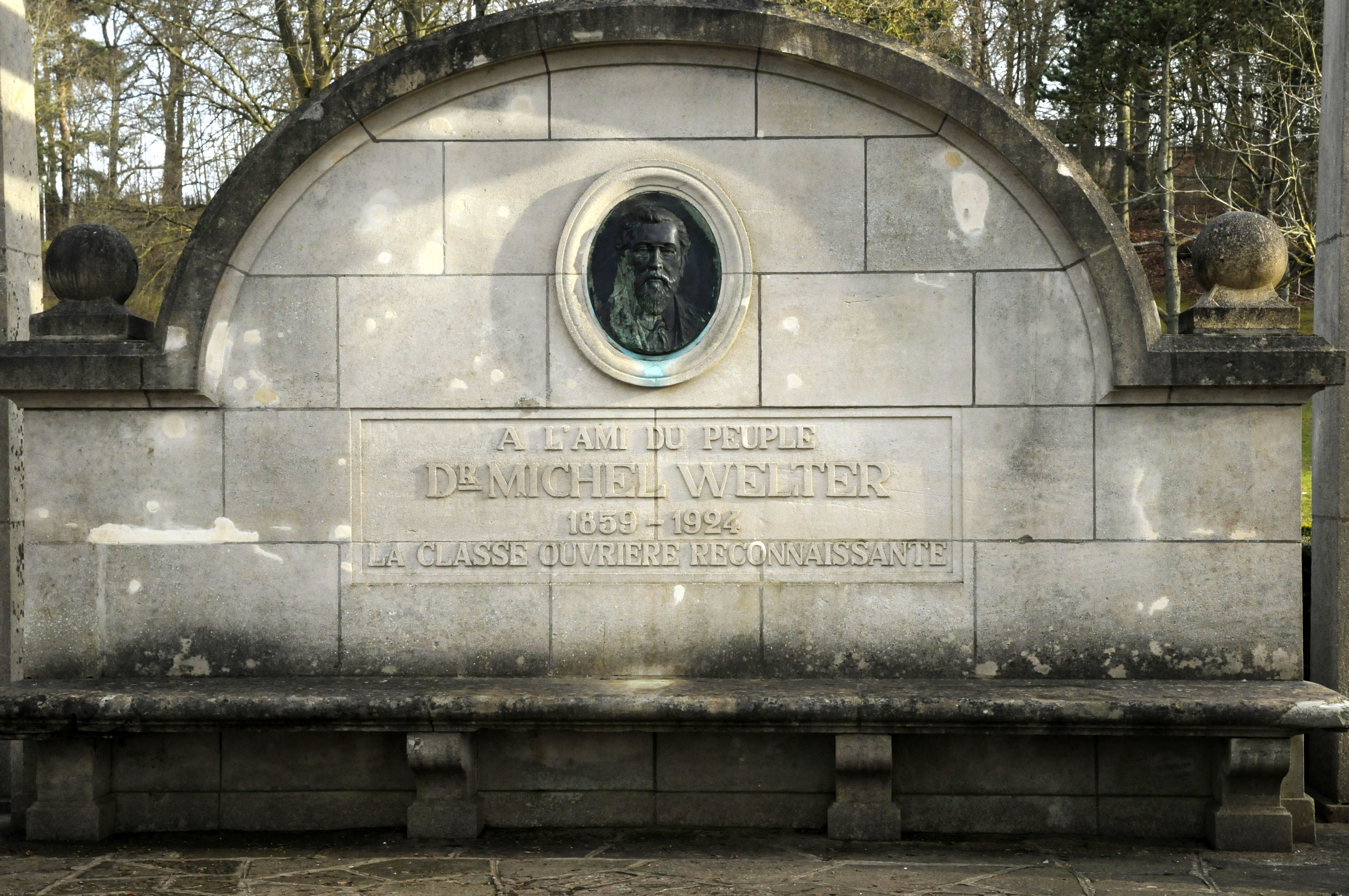
To the friend of the people - the grateful working class

Towards the end of the war he was a member of the Luxembourgish Soviet, which called for the nationalisation of the iron industry, the introduction of the 8-hour day, the abdication of the Grand Duchess and the establishment of a republic. The question over the dynasty and the form of government was decided in the 1919 referendum; the same year saw the introduction of women's suffrage. Welter joined the Chamber of Deputies again in 1920, but was not re-elected in 1922.

Two years later, he died of a stroke, in 1924.

The city of Esch dedicated a monument to him on 21 August 1927 in the park on the Galgenberg, with the inscription: À l'ami du peuple - la classe ouvrière reconnaissante ("To the friend of the people - the grateful working class").
