= List of ministers for justice of Luxembourg =

The minister for justice (Luxembourgish: Justizminister; French: ministre de la justice; German: Justizminister) is a position in the government of Luxembourg. Among other competences, the minister for justice is responsible for prisons, extradition, gambling, and the smooth operation of the judiciary.

The position of Minister for Justice has been in continuous existence since the promulgation of Luxembourg's first constitution, in 1848. Originally, justice was within the remit of the Administrator-General for Foreign Affairs, Justice, and Religion (Administrateur général des Affaires étrangères, de la Justice et des Cultes), but justice was separated from this office on 23 September 1853.

Since 24 March 1936, the title of Minister for Justice has been an official one, although the position had been unofficially known by that name since its creation. From the position's creation until 28 November 1857, the Minister went by the title of Administrator-General. From 1857 until 1936, the Minister went by the title of Director-General.

== List of ministers for justice ==
Minister	Party	Start date	End date	Prime Minister
Gaspard-Théodore-Ignace de la Fontaine	None	1 August 1848	2 December 1848	G T I de la Fontaine
Jean-Jacques Willmar	None	2 December 1848	23 September 1853	Jean-Jacques Willmar
François-Xavier Wurth	None	23 September 1853	24 May 1856	Charles-Mathias Simons
Charles-Gérard Eyschen	None	24 May 1856	29 November 1857	Charles-Mathias Simons
Guillaume-Mathias Augustin	None	29 November 1857	23 June 1859	Charles-Mathias Simons
Charles-Mathias Simons	None	23 June 1859	15 July 1859	Charles-Mathias Simons
Édouard Thilges	None	15 July 1859	26 September 1860	Charles-Mathias Simons
Michel Jonas	None	26 September 1860	9 September 1863	Baron de Tornaco
Bernard-Hubert Neuman	None	9 September 1863	31 March 1864	Baron de Tornaco
Henri Vannérus (first time)	None	31 March 1864	3 December 1866	Baron de Tornaco
Léon de la Fontaine	None	3 December 1866	17 June 1867	Baron de Tornaco
Henri Vannérus (second time)	None	17 June 1867	26 December 1874	Emmanuel Servais
Alphonse Funck	None	26 December 1874	20 April 1876	Baron de Blochausen
Paul Eyschen	None	20 April 1876	20 February 1885	Baron de Blochausen
Paul Eyschen	None	20 February 1885	22 September 1888	Édouard Thilges
Paul Eyschen	None	22 September 1888	3 March 1915	Paul Eyschen
Victor Thorn (first time)	None	3 March 1915	12 October 1915	Paul Eyschen
Victor Thorn (first time)	None	12 October 1915	6 November 1915	Mathias Mongenast
Jean-Baptiste Sax	None	6 November 1915	24 February 1916	Hubert Loutsch
Victor Thorn (second time)	None	24 February 1916	19 June 1917	Victor Thorn
Léon Moutrier	LL	19 June 1917	28 September 1918	Léon Kauffmann
Auguste Liesch	LL	28 September 1918	15 April 1921	Émile Reuter
Guillaume Leidenbach	PD	15 April 1921	14 April 1923	Émile Reuter
Joseph Bech	PD	14 April 1923	20 March 1925	Émile Reuter
Norbert Dumont	PRS	20 March 1925	16 July 1926	Pierre Prüm
Norbert Dumont	PRS	16 July 1926	27 December 1936	Joseph Bech
Étienne Schmit	PRL	27 December 1936	5 November 1937	Joseph Bech
René Blum	POS	5 November 1937	6 April 1940	Pierre Dupong
Victor Bodson (first time)	POS	6 April 1940	23 November 1945	Pierre Dupong
Victor Bodson (first time)	LSAP	23 November 1945	1 March 1947	Pierre Dupong
Eugène Schaus (first time)	GPD	1 March 1947	3 July 1951	Pierre Dupong
Victor Bodson (second time)	LSAP	3 July 1951	23 December 1953	Pierre Dupong
Victor Bodson (second time)	LSAP	23 December 1953	29 March 1958	Joseph Bech
Victor Bodson (second time)	LSAP	29 March 1958	2 March 1959	Pierre Frieden
Pierre Werner	CSV	2 March 1959	3 January 1967	Pierre Werner
Jean Dupong	CSV	3 January 1967	6 February 1969	Pierre Werner
Eugène Schaus (second time)	DP	6 February 1969	15 June 1974	Pierre Werner
Robert Krieps (first time)	LSAP	15 June 1974	16 July 1979	Gaston Thorn
Gaston Thorn	DP	16 July 1979	22 November 1980	Pierre Werner
Colette Flesch	DP	22 November 1980	20 July 1984	Pierre Werner
Robert Krieps (second time)	LSAP	20 July 1984	14 July 1989	Jacques Santer
Marc Fischbach	CSV	14 July 1989	26 January 1995	Jacques Santer
Marc Fischbach	CSV	26 January 1995	30 January 1998	Jean-Claude Juncker
Luc Frieden	CSV	30 January 1998	23 July 2009	Jean-Claude Juncker
François Biltgen	CSV	23 July 2009	30 April 2013	Jean-Claude Juncker
Octavie Modert	CSV	30 April 2013	4 December 2013	Jean-Claude Juncker
Felix Braz	DG	4 December 2013	11 October 2019	Xavier Bettel
Sam Tanson	DG	11 October 2019	17 November 2023	Xavier Bettel
Elisabeth Margue	CSV	17 November 2023	Incumbent	Luc Frieden
