= Norbert Dumont =

Luxembourgish politician

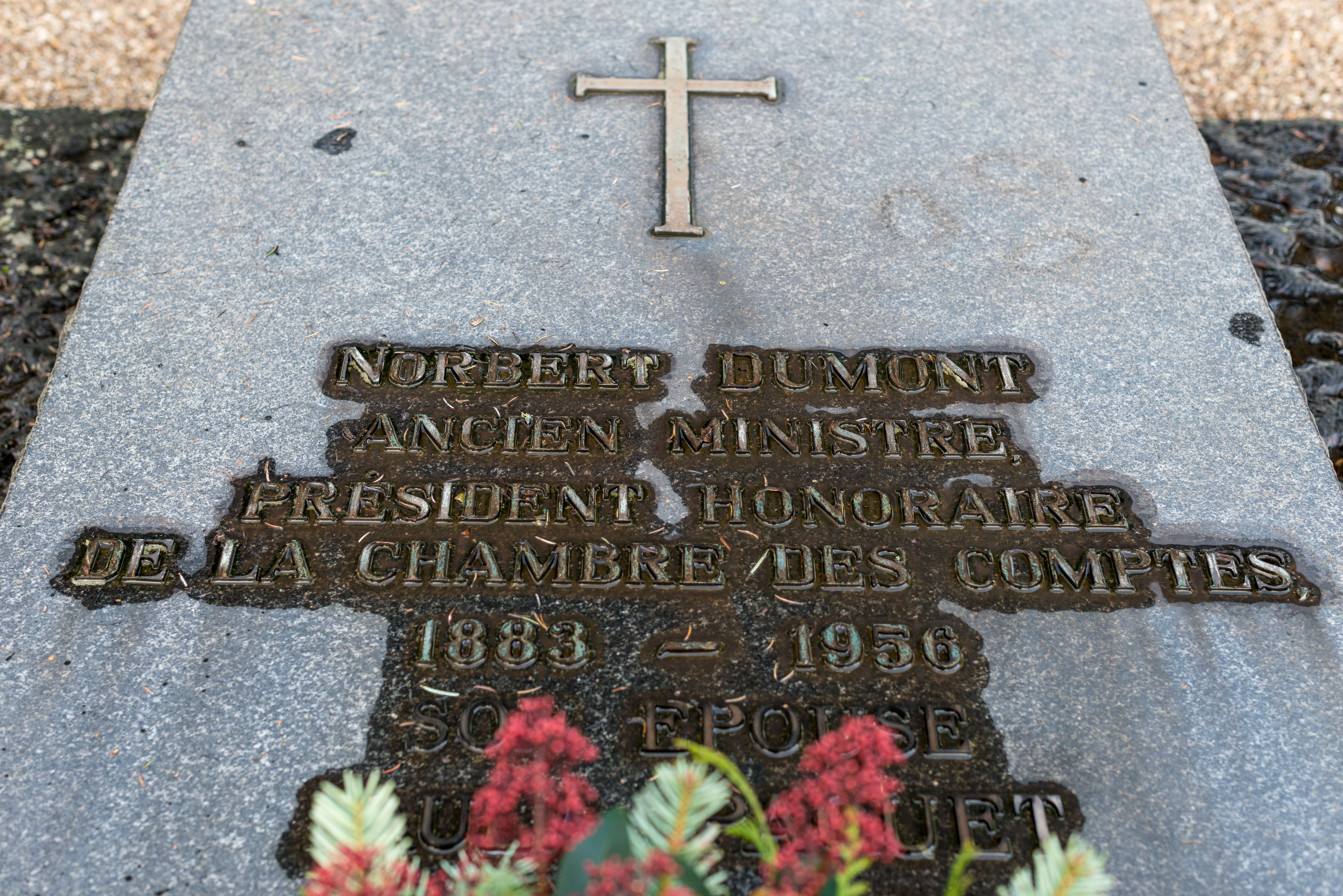
- Grave, Merl, Luxembourg
- Born: 7 February 1883; Mersch, Luxembourg
- Died: 15 May 1956 (aged 73)

Norbert Dumont (7 February 1883 — 15 May 1956) was a Luxembourgish politician and jurist. Dumont held office in the governments of Pierre Prüm (1925–1926) and Joseph Bech (1926–1936). He was considered a right wing politician.

Political offices
Preceded by Joseph Bech	Director-General for Justice; 1925–1936	Succeeded by Étienne Schmit
Preceded by Guillaume Soisson	Director-General for Public Works; 1925–1932	Succeeded by Albert Clemang
