= Auguste Liesch =

Jean-Baptiste Auguste Liesch (18 August 1874 – 13 March 1949) was a Luxembourgish liberal politician, writer, and civil servant.

He held the positions of Director-General for Justice and Director-General for Public Works in the government of Émile Reuter from 28 September 1918 to 15 April 1921. A member of the Liberal League, Liesch resigned from the government along with Michel Welter in 1921 in order to hold to account the majority Party of the Right.

After his departure from the government, he served as the Inspector-General for Customs and Assizes until 1939. On 23 January 1937, he was appointed to the Council of State of Luxembourg, in which he sat until 16 November 1945 (although only nominally for most of that period, due to the German occupation of Luxembourg in World War II).

== Footnotes ==
Political offices
Preceded by Léon Moutrier	Director-General for Justice; 1918–1921	Succeeded by Guillaume Leidenbach
Preceded by Antoine Lefort	Director-General for Public Works; 1918–1921	Succeeded by Guillaume Leidenbach
