= 1919 Luxembourg referendum =

Public vote on the political and economic orientation of Luxembourg

- 28 September 1919
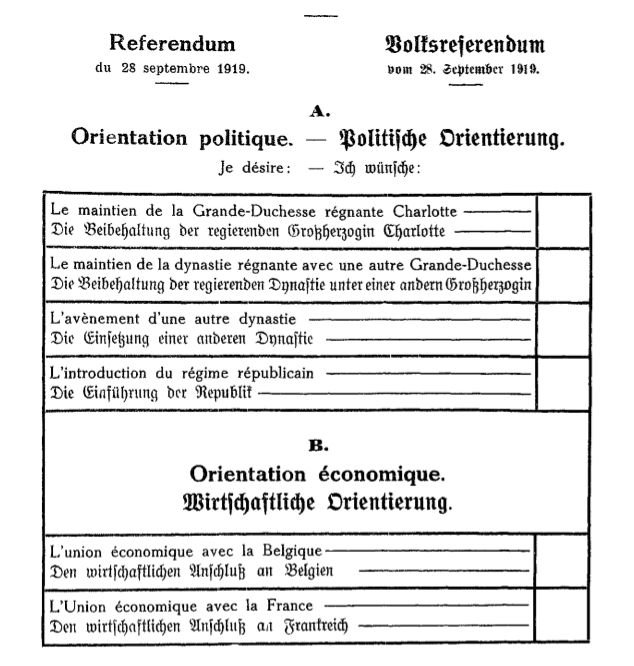
- Referendum questions in French and German

Head of State
Grand Duchess Charlotte	77.80%
Republic	19.66%
Retain the dynasty, but replace Charlotte	1.50%
Retain the monarchy, but replace the dynasty	1.04%

Economic union with Belgium or France
Belgium	27.00%
France	73.00%

A double referendum took place in Luxembourg on 28 September 1919. Voters were asked questions on their preferred head of state and whether there should be an economic union with either France or Belgium. The majority voted to retain Grand Duchess Charlotte as head of state, and for economic union with France.

== Results ==
=== Head of state ===
Choice	Votes	%
Grand Duchess Charlotte	66,811	77.80
Republic	16,885	19.66
Retain the dynasty, but replace Charlotte	1,286	1.50
Retain the monarchy, but replace the dynasty	889	1.04
Total	85,871	100.00
Valid votes	85,871	94.38
Invalid/blank votes	5,113	5.62
Total votes	90,984	100.00
Registered voters/turnout	126,193	72.10
Source: Nohlen & Stöver

=== Economic union ===
Choice	Votes	%
France	60,133	73.00
Belgium	22,242	27.00
Total	82,375	100.00
Valid votes	82,375	90.54
Invalid/blank votes	8,609	9.46
Total votes	90,984	100.00
Registered voters/turnout	126,193	72.10
Source: Nohlen & Stöver

== Outcome ==
Both results were seen as being highly indicative of the country's will, and were acted upon. The result in favour of the monarchy was seen to be a Wilsonian act of self-determination, in opposition to the 'French' republic or the imposition of the Belgian dynasty. By defeating both of these prospects, the referendum result put a clear end to the Allied Powers' discussion of Luxembourg's destiny. The political result was to have settled the national question, left the Grand Duchess as the incarnation of the nation itself, and settled the republican issue once and for all, as although the monarchy still had its detractors, particularly amongst socialists, its importance as a political issue waned considerably. An exception was the city of Esch-sur-Alzette, in which the majority (55%) voted for becoming a republic. In Luxembourg City only 33% voted for a republic.

The economic question was more difficult for the government to implement. Indeed, since 1917, France had promised Belgium free rein (economically) in Luxembourg, and had informally precluded a customs union, but negotiations with the French government proceeded nonetheless, before collapsing in May 1920. This prompted the government to turn to Belgium. Within a year, negotiations had been completed and a treaty was signed on 25 July 1921 to create the Belgium–Luxembourg Economic Union (UEBL). Due to the referendum result, and a lingering distrust of Belgium's political motives, the public in Luxembourg greatly resented the treaty. However, the treaty was still successfully ratified by the Chamber of Deputies on 22 December 1922, with 27 votes for, 13 against, and 8 in abstention.

== See also ==
- Reuter Ministry
- History of Luxembourg
