= Guillaume Soisson =

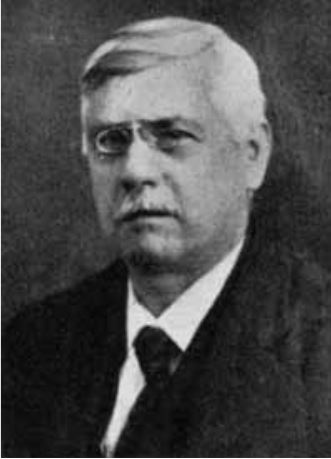
Guillaume Soisson Portrait

Guillaume Soisson (18 November 1866 – 27 August 1938) was a Luxembourgish engineer and politician for the Party of the Right.

A conservative, Soisson entered the cabinet of Hubert Loutsch in 1915 as the Director-General for Public Works and Director-General of Agriculture. He resigned, along with the Prime Minister, on 24 February 1916. He entered the cabinet for the second time, under Émile Reuter, as the Director-General for Public Works: replacing Guillaume Leidenbach, who had resigned on 14 April 1923.

== Footnotes ==
Political offices
Preceded by Victor Thorn	Director-General for Public Works; 1st time 1915 – 1916	Succeeded by Antoine Lefort
Preceded by Guillaume Leidenbach	Director-General for Public Works; 2nd time 1923 – 1925	Succeeded by Norbert Dumont
