= Victor Thorn =

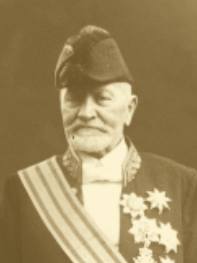

11th Prime Minister of Luxembourg
- In office 24 February 1916 – 19 June 1917
- Monarch: Marie-Adélaïde
- Preceded by: Hubert Loutsch
- Succeeded by: Léon Kauffman

Personal details
- Born: 31 January 1844 Esch-sur-Alzette, Luxembourg
- Died: 15 September 1930 (aged 86) Luxembourg City, Luxembourg

Victor Thorn (31 January 1844 – 15 September 1930) was a Luxembourgish politician who served as 11th Prime Minister of Luxembourg from 1916 to 1917. Prior to his tenure as prime minister he was Director General of Public Works from 1888 to 1892, and Director General of Justice and Public Works in 1915.

== Early life ==
Victor Thorn was born in Esch-sur-Alzette, Luxembourg, on 31 January 1844. From 1863 to 1866, he studied law at Ghent University, Heidelberg University, and University of Dijon. He was admitted to the bar in Luxembourg in 1867.

== Career ==
From 1868 to 1883, Thorn worked as a lawyer. In 1883, he was appointed as State Attorney and as Attorney General in 1899. Between 1885 and 1930, he was a member of the Council of State of Luxembourg on multiple occasions.

From 22 September 1888 to 26 October 1892, Thorn was Director General of Public Works. He was Director General of Justice and Public Works in Prime Minister Mathias Mongenast's cabinet from 3 March to 6 November 1915.

On 24 February 1916, Thorn became the 11th Prime Minister of Luxembourg and was one of five governments that Luxembourg had during World War I. His government was a coalition between the Liberal League and Luxembourg Socialist Workers' Party. Thorn also held the position of Director General of Foreign Affairs and Justice in his government.

Thorn's government attempted to curb inflation by instituting price controls, but this produced a large black market. In June 1917, a mining strike started and was suppressed by the Germany Army. Director General of Agriculture Michel Welter lost a motion of no confidence in the Chamber of Deputies and Thorn's government lost its majority after the election of three independent deputies in 1917. The government resigned on 19 June 1917, A government led by Léon Kauffman was formed to succeed him.

== Later life ==
In 1921, Thorn became a member of the Permanent Court of Arbitration and served until 1927. He died in Luxembourg City on 15 September 1930.

== See also ==
- National Union Government (1916)

== Works cited ==
=== Journals ===
- Putnam, Ruth (1920). "The Luxemburg Chamber of Deputies". American Political Science Review. 14 (4). American Political Science Association: 607–634. doi:10.2307/1943854. hdl:2027/hvd.32044082331042. JSTOR 1943854.

=== Web ===
- "Prime Minister Victor Thorn". Éischte Weltkrich. Archived from the original on 21 June 2025.
- Majerus, Benoît; Roemer, Charel (1 June 2015). "Luxembourg". 1914–1918 Online. Archived from the original on 9 May 2025.
- Thewes, Guy (2011). "Les gouvernements du Gand-Duché de Luxembourg depuis 1848" (PDF). Luxembourg City: Service Information et Presse. ISBN 978-2-87999-212-9. Archived from the original (PDF) on 3 March 2016.

Political offices
Preceded by Victor de Roebé	Director-General for Public Works; 1st time 1888–1892	Succeeded by Paul Eyschen
Preceded by Paul Eyschen	Director-General for Justice; 1st time 1915	Succeeded by Jean-Baptiste Sax
Preceded by Charles de Waha	Director-General for Public Works; 2nd time 1915	Succeeded by Guillaume Soisson
Preceded by Hubert Loutsch	Prime Minister of Luxembourg; 1916–1917	Succeeded by Léon Kauffmann
Preceded by Hubert Loutsch	Director-General for Foreign Affairs; 1916–1917	Succeeded by Léon Kauffmann
Preceded by Jean-Baptiste Sax	Director-General for Justice; 2nd time 1916–1917	Succeeded by Léon Moutrier
Preceded by Henri Vannérus	President of the Council of State; 1st time 1914–1916	Succeeded by Mathias Mongenast
Preceded by Mathias Mongenast	President of the Council of State; 2nd time 1917–1930	Succeeded by Joseph Steichen
