= Antoine Lefort =

Luxembourgish politician and diplomat

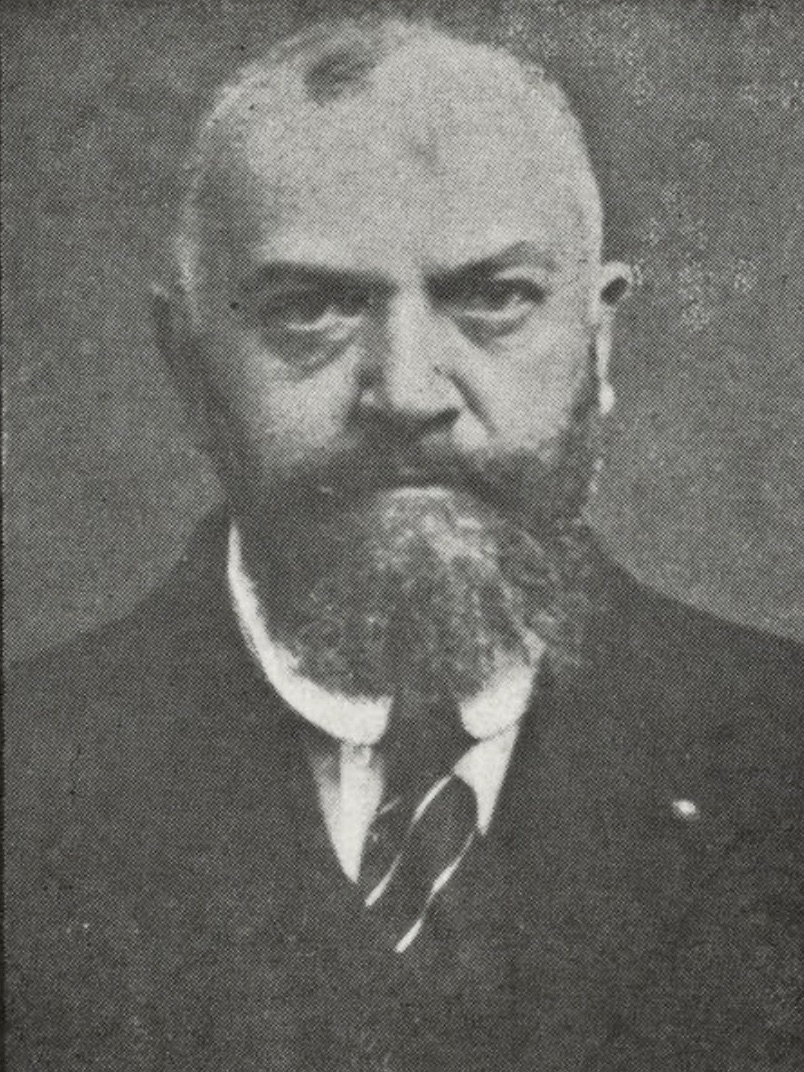
Tony Lefort

Antoine Lefort-Mousel (1879 – 1928) was a Luxembourgish politician and diplomat. A member of Luxembourg's Chamber of Deputies for the Party of the Right, he served as the Director-General for Public Works from 24 February 1916 until 28 September 1918. Later, he served as a diplomat, including as chargé d'affaires in Switzerland.

== Footnotes ==
Political offices
Preceded by Guillaume Soisson	Director-General for Public Works; 1916 – 1918	Succeeded by Auguste Liesch
