= Léon Moutrier =

Léon Moutrier (born 1872) was a Luxembourgish politician and diplomat. A member of Luxembourg's Chamber of Deputies for the Liberal League, he served as the Director-General for the Interior and Public Information from 24 February 1916 until 18 June 1917, and for Justice and Public Information from that date until 28 September 1918.

Political offices
Preceded by Victor Thorn	Minister for Justice; 1917 – 1918	Succeeded by Auguste Liesch
