= Léon Kauffman =

12th Prime Minister of Luxembourg

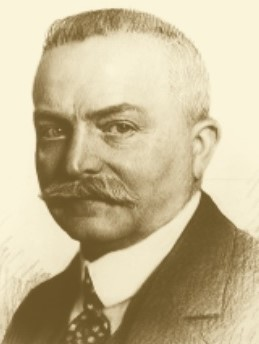

Prime Minister of Luxembourg
- In office 18 June 1917 – 28 September 1918
- Monarch: Marie-Adélaïde
- Preceded by: Victor Thorn
- Succeeded by: Émile Reuter

Personal details
- Born: 16 August 1869 Luxembourg City, Luxembourg
- Died: 25 March 1952 (aged 82) Luxembourg, Luxembourg
- Party: Independent
- Spouse: Madeleine Franck

Léon Kauffman (16 August 1869 – 25 March 1952) was a Luxembourgish politician. He was prime minister of Luxembourg, serving for one year, from 18 June 1917 until 28 September 1918.

== Biography ==
After studying law, in 1893 Kauffman was appointed an Attaché of the Parquet Général, and then was a justice of the peace in Echternach from 1898 to 1900. Then he was a senior civil servant from 1902 to 1910. In 1910 he became director of the tax administration and president of the Assurances sociales. In 1916 he became Director-General (Minister) of Finance, until 1918. In 1917 there was a crisis within the Thorn Ministry, as the Chamber of Deputies had withdrawn confidence from agriculture minister Michel Welter.

On 19 June 1917 Kauffman put together a Right-Liberal government, in which he was prime minister, as well as the Foreign and Finance Minister. Under this government, changes to the constitution were put into motion which were to introduce universal suffrage. There were disagreements, however, as the government refused, as the Chamber demanded, to establish the origins of sovereign power "in the nation," instead of "in the person of the Grand Duke", as hitherto. When it became known that the prime minister had been present at a private visit of the German chancellor Georg von Hertling to Grand Duchess Marie-Adélaïde on 16 August 1918, the government was reformed. Léon Kauffman resigned as prime minister on 28 September 1918. From 1915 to 1945 he was a member, and from 1945 to 1952 he was president of the Council of State. From 1923 to 1952, he was president of the executive board of the Banque Internationale à Luxembourg.

He died in 1952 in Luxembourg City.

== Personal life ==
He was married to Madeleine Joséphine Franck, and had one son.

== Footnotes ==
Political offices
Preceded by Edmond Reiffers	Director-General for Finances; 1916–1918	Succeeded by Alphonse Neyens
Preceded by Victor Thorn	Prime Minister of Luxembourg; 1917–1918	Succeeded by Émile Reuter
Preceded by Victor Thorn	Director-General for Foreign Affairs; 1917–1918	Succeeded by Émile Reuter
Preceded by Ernest Hamélius	President of the Council of State; 1945–1952	Succeeded by Félix Welter
