= Blochausen Ministry =

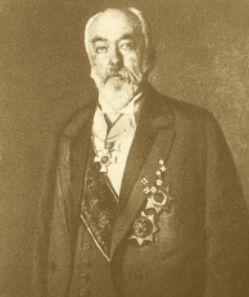
Félix de Blochausen, Prime Minister 1874-1885

The Blochausen Ministry was the government of the Grand Duchy of Luxembourg from 26 December 1874 to 20 February 1885. It was led by Baron Félix de Blochausen.

== Composition ==
=== 26 December 1874 to 6 August 1878 ===
- Félix de Blochausen: Minister of State, head of government, Director-General for Foreign Affairs
- Nicolas Salentiny: Director-General for the Interior
- Victor de Roebe: Director-General for Public Works
- Alphonse Funck: Director-General for Justice

=== 6 August 1878 to 21 September 1882 ===
- Félix de Blochausen: Minister of State, head of government, Director-General for Foreign Affairs
- Victor de Roebe: Director-General for Finance
- Paul Eyschen: Director-General for Justice
- Henri Kirpach: Director-General for the Interior

=== 21 September 1882 to 12 October 1882 ===
- Félix de Blochausen: Minister of State, head of government, Director-General for Foreign Affairs, temporarily also for Finance
- Paul Eyschen: Director-General for Justice
- Henri Kirpach: Director-General for the Interior

=== 12 October 1882 to 20 February 1885 ===
- Félix de Blochausen: Minister of State, head of government, Director-General for Foreign Affairs
- Paul Eyschen: Director-General for Justice
- Henri Kirpach: Director-General for the Interior
- Mathias Mongenast: Director-General for Finance

== Foreign policy ==
Although the dissolution of the German Confederation, and Luxembourg's neutrality as stipulated in the Treaty of London provided for the Grand Duchy's political independence with regards to Germany, the country entered more and more into the German Empire's economic orbit through the Zollverein. Despite this growing dependence, Luxembourg did not participate in the deliberations of the Zollverein, and had no influence on customs policy. The government took steps to be involved in the decision-making. Félix de Blochausen suggested to William III to propose to the German government to admit a Luxembourgish representative in the Bundesrat, who would be able to vote on customs matters. Despite the apparently favourable attitude of German chancellor Otto von Bismarck, this course of action failed in light of the resistance of other signatories of the Treaty of London, who regarded it as incompatible with Luxembourg's neutrality.

== Domestic policy ==
=== Penal code ===
The Blochausen government tackled reform of the penal justice system. The penal code that was in force at the time, dated from 1810, and was no longer suited to the needs of the time. There were two models available to the Luxembourgish reformers: the German code of 1870, or the Belgian code of 1867. In his report to the Lieutenant-Governor Prince Henry in 1875, the Director-General for Justice Alphonse Funck recommended the adoption of the Belgian model: "Our constitution, or most important social and political laws were drawn from Belgian legislation; our ideas and our needs are close to those of our neighbours to the West […]." The Belgian penal code was finally introduced in Luxembourg in 1879 with some adaptations. This eliminated the excesses of criminal theories founded exclusively on reparation and utility, and granted a more important place to attenuating circumstances. The new penal code also included the controversial Pulpit Law.

=== Education ===
The Blochausen government enacted important reforms in primary education. Overcoming the opposition of conservative Deputies, it made school attendance mandatory for six years. The Kirpach law of 20 April 1881 made schooling obligatory for children between the ages of 6 and 12. School absenteeism was particularly widespread in rural regions, where children worked on farms. The reform gave rise to intense debates on the state's role in society, and relations between church and state. The constitution mandated a unitary system of public schools. It specified the state's duty to organise teaching. The church on the other hand, retained a right to be involved in education to some extent, as parish priests were automatically a member of their local school commission, and the teacher was under their surveillance.

== Economic policy ==
=== Railways ===
In the parliamentary debates that took place after the bankruptcy of the Banque nationale, the director-general (minister) Paul Eyschen defended the government in these terms: "Without Baron de Blochausen [...] about two-thirds of the country would never have had the railways which criss-cross the country today. Without him we would also have had difficulty in realising these considerable and numerous improvements in agriculture, by extending the network of local railways, by reforming livestock, by creating an agricultural school, by improving and perfecting the waterworks." Under the rule of Blochausen and Eyschen, the company tasked with creating a belt line railway was cleaned up, thanks to the creation of the "Société anonyme luxembourgeoise des chemins de fer et minières Prince-Henri" in 1877. In 1880, the rail network reached 140 km. From 1880, narrow gauge railway lines started to be constructed which made accessible rural areas of the country, and whose names -- Jhangeli, Charly and Benny -- paid testament to the progress which they represented in the eyes of the population.

=== Banque nationale collapse ===
Railway construction, the rise of the steel industry, and possibilities for making money offered favourable conditions to the rise of finance. It was the time for speculation. Baron Blochausen let himself be drawn into this. He had inherited the Banque nationale from his predecessor, which was a Luxembourgish bank of issue, which also granted loans. Critics had made the government aware of the risk of the coexistence of several banks of issue in a small country. The companies of Norbert Metz and the Société Guillaume-Luxembourg, close to the Banque internationale, refused to accept the notes of the competing bank. The Banque nationale soon encountered grave difficulties, and was forced to close its doors on 26 September 1881. The first crash of Luxembourg's financial history shook the public. Several people went as far as burning the notes of the Banque nationale in the Place d'Armes in Luxembourg City. In order to attenuate the social consequences, the government decided to reimburse the holders of the collapsed bank's notes. In order to meet these expenses, the government was forced to take out a loan of three million francs.
