= Leclère =

Leclère is a French surname. Notable people with the surname include:

- Achille-François-René Leclère (1785–1853), French architect
- Adhémar Leclère (1853–1917), French diplomat and politician
- Alexandra Leclère, French film director
- Ernest Leclère (1865–1938), Luxembourgian politician
- Michel Leclère (born 1946), French racing driver
