= Mongenast Ministry =

Government of Luxembourg, 12 October–6 November 1915

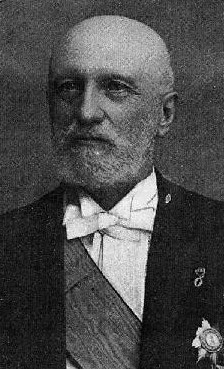
Mathias Mongenast was president of the ministry

The Mongenast Ministry was only in office in Luxembourg for 25 days, from 12 October to 6 November 1915.

== Composition ==
- Mathias Mongenast: Director-General of Finances, acting President of the Council
- Victor Thorn: Director-General for Justice and Public Works
- Ernest Leclère: Director-General for the Interior
