= German occupation of Luxembourg =

German occupations of Luxembourg may refer to:

- The garrison of the German Confederation in Luxembourg (1815–1867)
- German occupation of Luxembourg during World War I (1914–1918)
- German occupation of Luxembourg during World War II (1940–1945)
