= German occupation of Luxembourg during World War I =

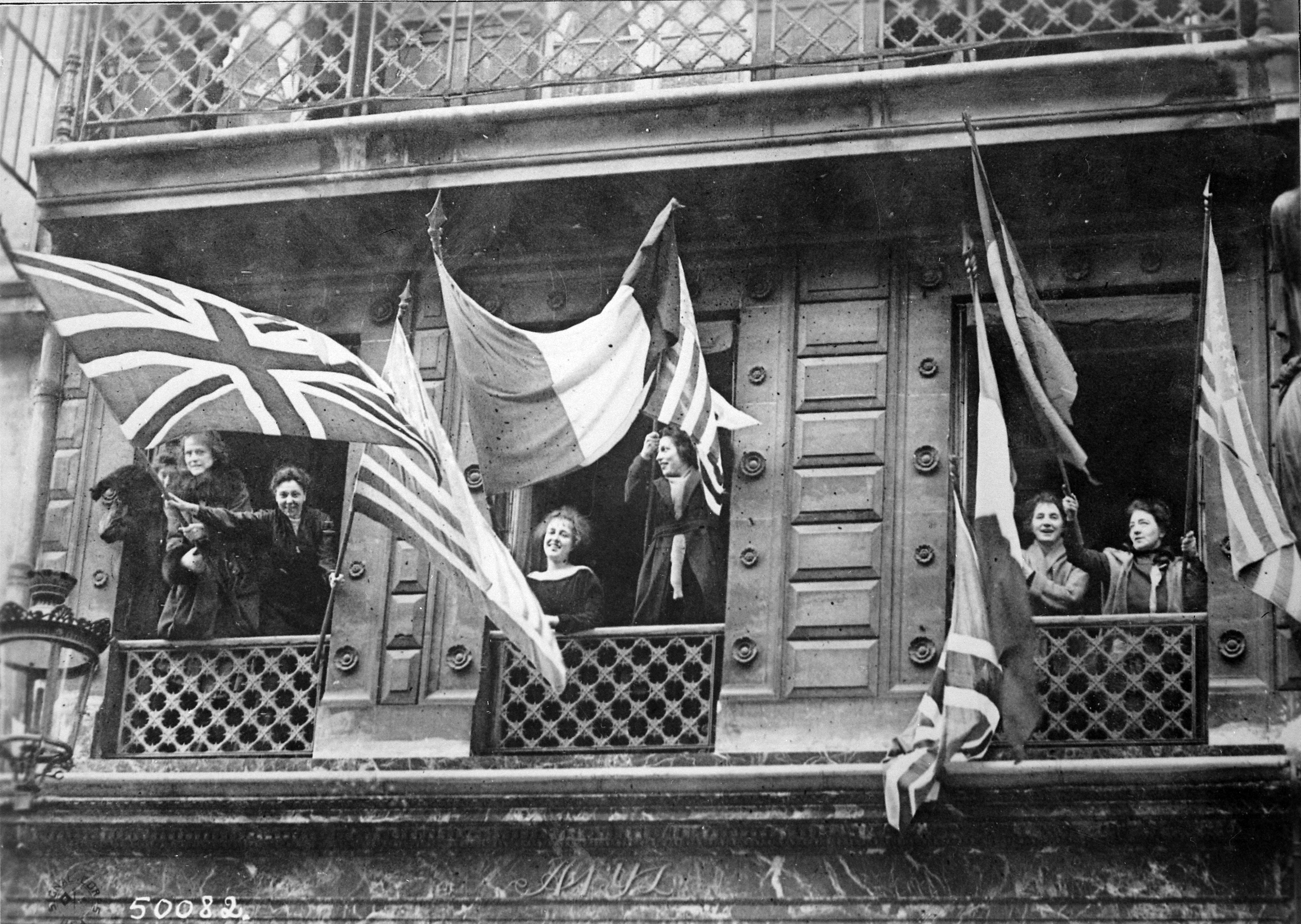
Luxembourgers celebrating the liberation of their country and welcoming the arrival of Allied soldiers after the Armistice, November 1918

From 2 August 1914 until the end of World War I on 11 November 1918, the Grand Duchy of Luxembourg was under full occupation by the German Empire. The German government justified the occupation by citing the need to support their armies in neighbouring France, although many Luxembourgers, past and present, have interpreted German actions otherwise.

During this period, Luxembourg was allowed to retain its own government and political system, but all proceedings were overshadowed by the German army's presence. Despite the overbearing distraction of the occupation, the Luxembourgish people attempted to lead their lives as normally as possible. The political parties attempted to focus on other matters, such as the economy, education, and constitutional reform.

The domestic political environment was further complicated by the death of Paul Eyschen, who had been prime minister for 27 years. With his death came a string of short-lived governments, culminating in rebellion, and constitutional turmoil after the withdrawal of German soldiers.

== Background ==
Since the 1867 Treaty of London, Luxembourg had been an explicitly neutral state. The Luxembourg Crisis had seen Prussia thwart a French attempt to purchase the Grand Duchy from the Netherlands. Luxembourg neutrality was accepted by the Prussian Chancellor, Otto von Bismarck, who said, "In exchange for the fortress of Luxembourg, we have been compensated by the neutrality of the country, and a guarantee that it shall be maintained in perpetuity".

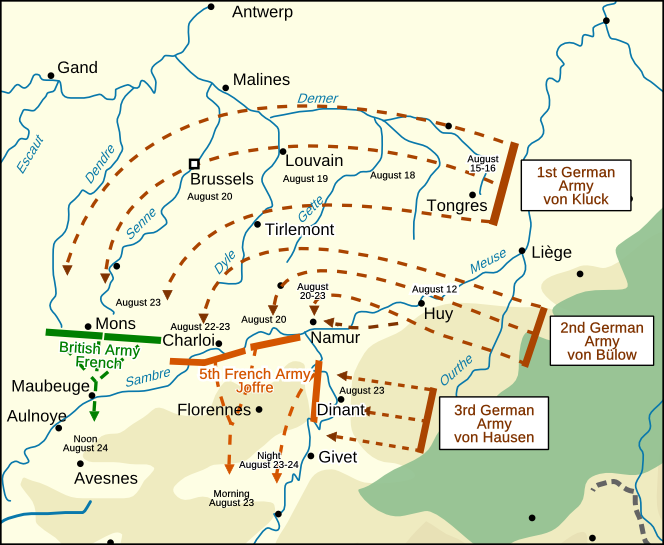
German advance through Belgium, August 1914

Since the 1860s, Luxembourgers had been keenly aware of German ambitions and the Luxembourg government was well aware of the implications of the German deployment plans. In 1911, the Prime Minister, Paul Eyschen, commissioned an engineer to evaluate western railway network in western Germany, particularly the likelihood that Germany would occupy Luxembourg to meet its supply needs for a campaign in France. Given the linguistic links between Luxembourg and Germany, it was feared that Germany might seek to annex Luxembourg into its empire. The government of Luxembourg aimed to avoid this by re-affirming its neutrality.

In June 1914, Archduke Franz Ferdinand, heir to the thrones of Austria-Hungary, was assassinated by pan-Slav nationalists, leading to a sudden deterioration in relations between Austria-Hungary and Serbia. Austria-Hungary was supported by the German Empire, while Serbia had the backing of the Russian Empire. On 28 July, Austria-Hungary declared war on Serbia, which, in turn, required the mobilisation of Russia and hence of Germany, thanks to its responsibilities under the Dual Alliance. Anticipating a retaliatory declaration of war from France, Germany put into action the deployment plan of 1913, a rapid attack on France through the poorly defended Low Countries. This would bypass France's main defences on the common border. Germany quickly would force France to surrender and turn its full attention to the Eastern Front.

== Invasion ==
German invasion of Luxembourg
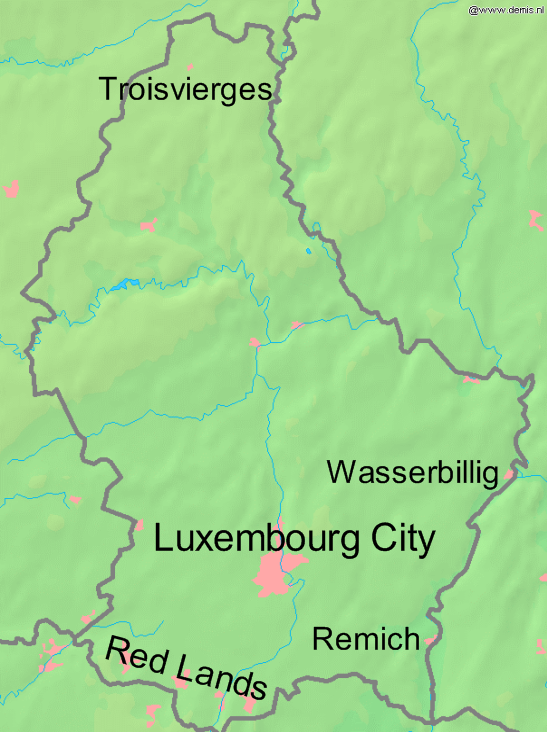
- Germany's main invasion thrust was towards Luxembourg City.
| Date | 2 August 1914 |
| Location | Luxembourg |
| Result | German Victory: Eyschen Government set up |
| Territorial changes | Luxembourg occupied by Germany |

Belligerents
| Luxembourg | Germany |

Commanders and leaders
| (Luxembourg) Marie-Adélaïde (Luxembourg) Paul Eyschen | (German Empire) Richard Tessmar |

Units involved
| (Luxembourg) Grand Duchy Army (Luxembourg) Grand Ducal Gendarmerie | (German Empire) Fourth Army |

Strength
| Luxembourg: 400 soldiers | German: 5000 Soldiers |

On 1 August 1914, Germany declared war on Russia. On the outbreak of war with its eastern neighbour, Germany put the Schlieffen Plan into action, and Luxembourg's government's fears were realised. Initially, Luxembourg was only a transit point for Albrecht von Württemberg's Fourth Army. One of the railways from the northern Rhineland into France passed through Troisvierges, in the far north of Luxembourg, and Germany's first infringement of Luxembourg's sovereignty and neutrality was the unauthorised use of Troisvierges station. It can be said to be the first military action on the Western front.

The next day, while French troops were still at a distance from the German frontier, Germany launched a full invasion. German soldiers began moving through south-eastern Luxembourg, crossing the Moselle river at Remich and Wasserbillig, and headed towards the capital, Luxembourg City. Tens of thousands of German soldiers had been deployed to Luxembourg in those 24 hours (although the Grand Duchy's government disputed any precise number that was suggested). Grand Duchess Marie-Adélaïde ordered that the Grand Duchy's small army, which numbered under 400, not resist. On the afternoon of 2 August she and Eyschen met the German commander Oberst Richard Karl von Tessmar on Luxembourg City's Adolphe Bridge, the symbol of Luxembourg's modernisation. They protested mildly, but both the young Grand Duchess and her aging statesman accepted German military rule as inevitable.

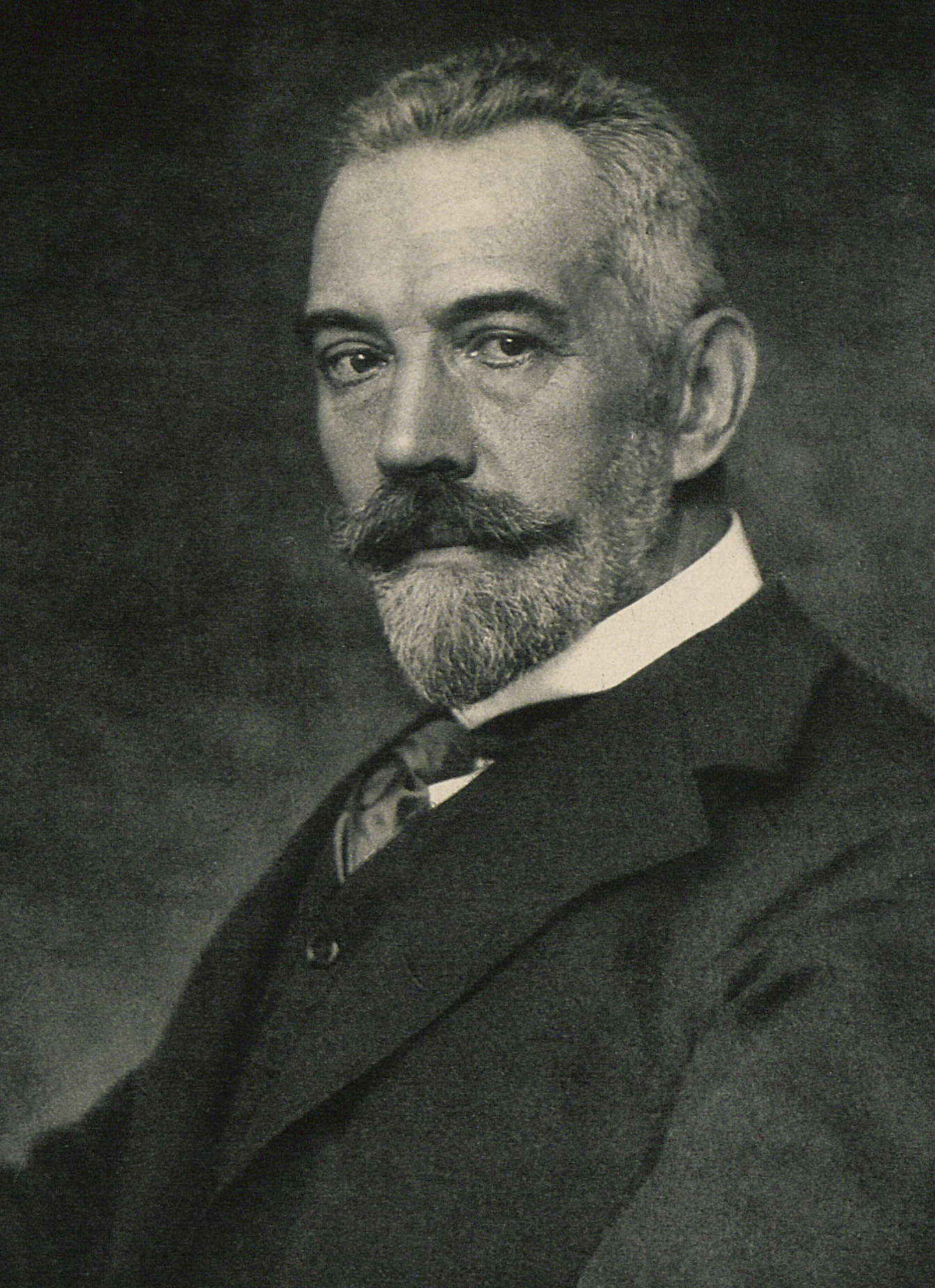
Theobald von Bethmann Hollweg, German Chancellor

On 2 August, German Chancellor Theobald von Bethmann Hollweg justified the complete occupation of Luxembourg in terms of military necessity, arguing that France was ready to invade Luxembourg itself. The French minister in Luxembourg dismissed this argument, claiming that it would not have considered violating Luxembourg's neutrality unless Germany had done so first. Bethmann Hollweg attempted to prove his country's regret by offering Luxembourg compensation for the losses due to the military presence. On 4 August, Bethmann Hollweg told the Reichstag:

We have been forced to ignore the just protestations of Luxembourg and the Belgian government. We shall make amends for this injustice as soon as our military goal is accomplished.

However, when it seemed that Germany was on the verge of victory, the Chancellor began to revise his statements. In an internal memorandum called the Septemberprogramm, not discovered until midcentury, Bethmann Hollweg proposed that Luxembourg become a German federal state, and for that result to be forced upon the Luxembourgish people once Germany achieved victory over the Triple Entente. However, the British and French halted the German advance at the Battle of the Marne in mid-September. This resulted in the indefinite continuation of German occupation.

== Eyschen government ==
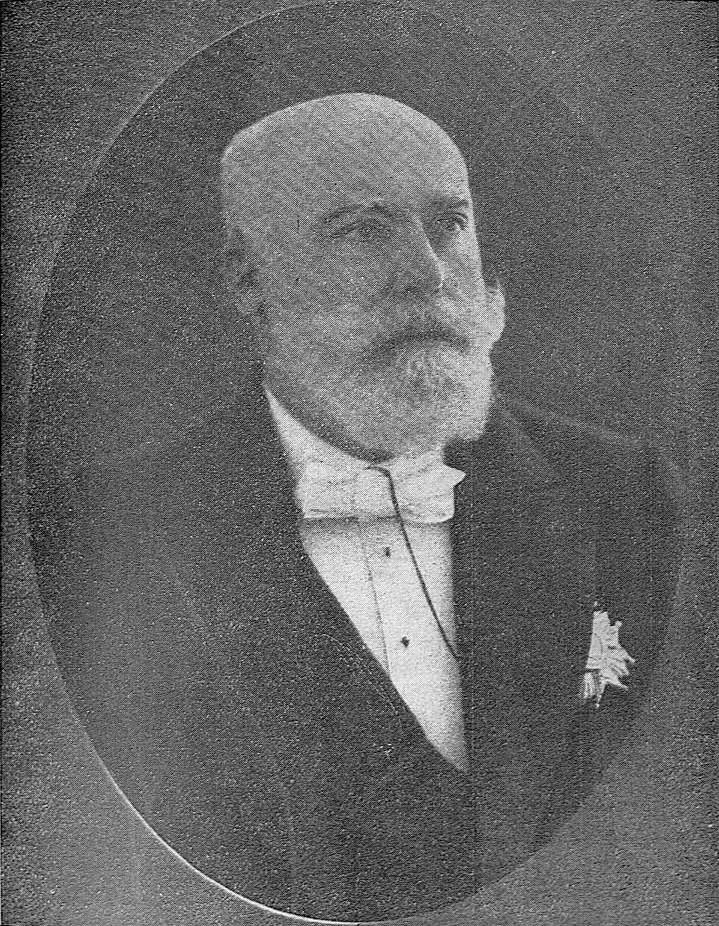
Eyschen's long premiership had been one of peace and prosperity.

Just as the war was in the balance on the Western Front, so the fate of Luxembourg was see-sawing back and forth. It was clear to all that the good conduct of the Luxembourgish government, if fully receptive to the needs of the German military administrators, could guarantee Luxembourg's continued self-government, at least in the short-term. Eyschen was a familiar and overwhelmingly popular leader, and all factions put their utmost faith in his ability to steer Luxembourg through the diplomatic minefield that was occupation. On 4 August, he expelled the French minister in Luxembourg at the request of the German minister, followed by the Belgian minister four days later and the Italian minister when his country entered the war. To the same end, Eyschen refused to speak ill of the German Zollverein, even though he had talked openly of exiting the customs union before the war began.

On occasions, Eyschen rebuked the occupying forces. On 13 October, a Luxembourgish journalist named Karl Dardar was arrested by the German army for publishing anti-German stories. He was then taken to Koblenz, and tried and sentenced by court-martial to three months' imprisonment. Eyschen was outraged that the Germans had kidnapped a Luxembourgish citizen and tried him for an extraterritorial offence, and Eyschen did nothing to hide his indignation. Eyschen told the German minister in Luxembourg that the action was a "direct injury to the Grand Duchy's national sovereignty".

Similar complaints were made, by both Eyschen and Victor Thorn, when a railway worker was arrested in January 1915 for allegedly working for French military intelligence, and subsequently tried and sentenced in Trier. As Minister for Justice, Thorn was incensed that the Luxembourgish legal system had been treated with such disdain. Such objections were not received well by the German authorities. Although they were tired of Eyschen's stubborn ways, he remained a useful tool to unite the various Luxembourgish political factions. On 23 June a letter was sent to the Luxembourg government stating that the Germans considered Luxembourg to be a theatre of war and that the population, therefore, was subject to military law.

Eyschen was not the only person to be politically active during the occupation. In the summer of 1915, Eyschen pushed to further reduce the role of the Catholic Church in the state school system. Grand Duchess Marie-Adélaïde objected. A fervently religious Catholic (as was most of the country, but not her late father, who was Protestant), she was reputed to have said, "I will not allow their most precious heritage [Roman Catholicism] to be stolen while I have the key." Marie-Adélaïde refused to budge, inviting Eyschen to resign if he could not accept her decision. Eyschen nearly resigned, but decided not to. Nevertheless, he died shortly after.

== After Eyschen ==
=== Eyschen's death ===
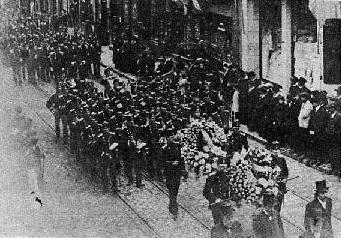
The funeral procession for Eyschen. His death in office led to three years of political upheaval.

On 11 October 1915, Luxembourg's political system was thrown into disarray by the death of Paul Eyschen. When war broke out, Eyschen had been 73 years old, but his premiership of 27 years was the only government that many Luxembourgers had known. Throughout the first year of German occupation, he had been a rock for the Luxembourgish people. He had also been of great importance to Marie-Adélaïde; the Grand Duchess had never been groomed for the position, was 53 years Eyschen's junior, and was considered both politically naïve and dangerously partisan for a constitutional monarch. The recent strains were relatively cosmetic.

Critically, Eyschen had the confidence of the Chamber of Deputies, and he had managed to hold together a government containing all major factions, seemingly by force of personality alone. To make matters worse for national unity, the strain of occupation had broken apart the pre-war anti-clericalist alliance between the socialist and the liberal factions, thus depriving both the clericalists and anti-clericalists of a legislative majority. The Catholic conservatives formed the largest bloc, but they were least likely to form a majority coalition.

=== Mongenast government ===
The day after Eyschen's death, Grand Duchess Marie-Adélaïde invited Mathias Mongenast, who had been Minister for Finance since 1882, to form a minority government. Mongenast's special status as a 'caretaker' Prime Minister is underlined by his official title; he was not 'President of the Government', as all other Prime Ministers since 1857 had been, but held the lesser title of 'President of the Council'.

Mongenast's administration was never intended to be long-lived, and Marie-Adélaïde's main objective when appointing the experienced Mongenast was to steady the ship. Nevertheless, nobody expected the government to fall as soon as it did. On 4 November, Mongenast nominated a new candidate for head of Luxembourg's école normale. The nomination did not meet with Grand Ducal approval, and Marie-Adélaïde rejected him. Mongenast persisted; education had been a hobby horse of his, and he imagined that the Grand Duchess would accept the advice of a minister as experienced as he was. He was wrong; the Grand Duchess had always been single-minded, and resented a minority Prime Minister, particularly one so new to the job, making demands of her. The next day, Mongenast resigned, just 25 days after being given the job.

=== Loutsch government ===
Having fought with Mongenast, the Grand Duchess decided to appoint an all-conservative cabinet led by Hubert Loutsch. The Chamber of Deputies was steadfastly opposed; the Party of the Right held only 20 seats out of 52, but they formed the plurality. Marie-Adélaïde sought to end this deadlock by dissolving the Chamber of Deputies and by calling for the voters to grant a mandate to the conservatives. This outraged the left, which assumed that its deputies alone had the constitutional right to grant the government confidence; it was dubbed by those on the left a 'coup d'état by the Grand Duchess'. Nonetheless, on 23 December, Luxembourg went to the polls. Although the position of the Party of the Right was improved, taking 25 seats, it fell a whisker short of winning an absolute majority. On 11 January 1916, the Chamber of Deputies passed a motion of no confidence, and Loutsch resigned.

== National Union Government ==
=== Forming a consensus ===
After the failure of the all-conservative government, the Grand Duchess turned to the leading liberal politician, Victor Thorn, to form a new government. After Eyschen's premiership of 27 years, two governments had come and gone in three months, and the Luxembourgish people were becoming disillusioned with the failure of the politicians. Thorn's nature was to be a conciliatory leader, and he made a direct appeal to the Chamber of Deputies to support his government, no matter the deputies' individual ideological persuasions: "If you want a government that acts, and is capable of acting, it is imperative that all parties support this government." This support was forthcoming from all parties, but only on the condition that each was invited into the government; Thorn was left with no choice but to afford them this. The resulting grand coalition cabinet included every leading light in Luxembourgish politics; besides Thorn himself, there were the conservatives Léon Kauffmann and Antoine Lefort, the socialist leader Dr Michel Welter, and the liberal Léon Moutrier.

=== Food shortage ===
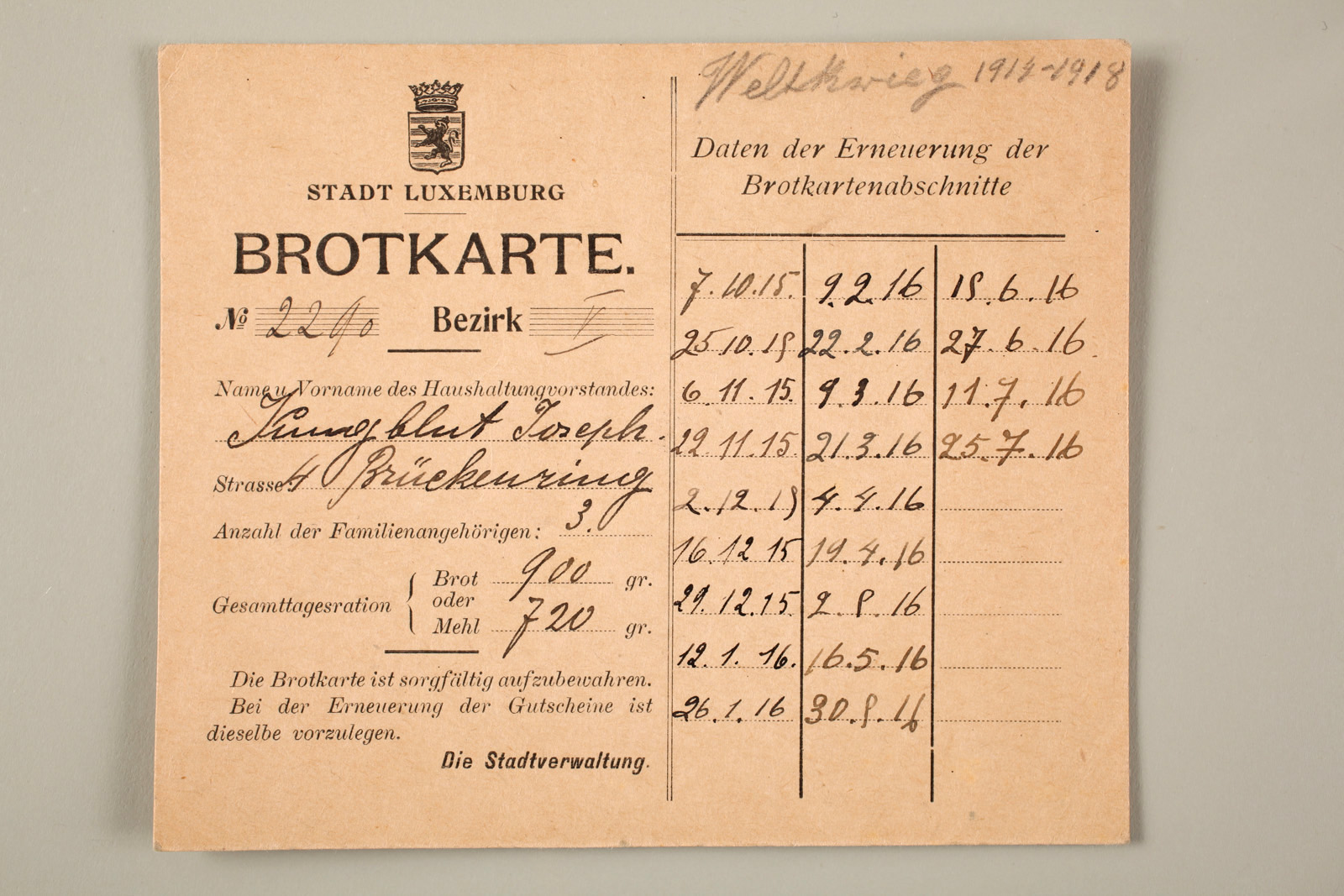
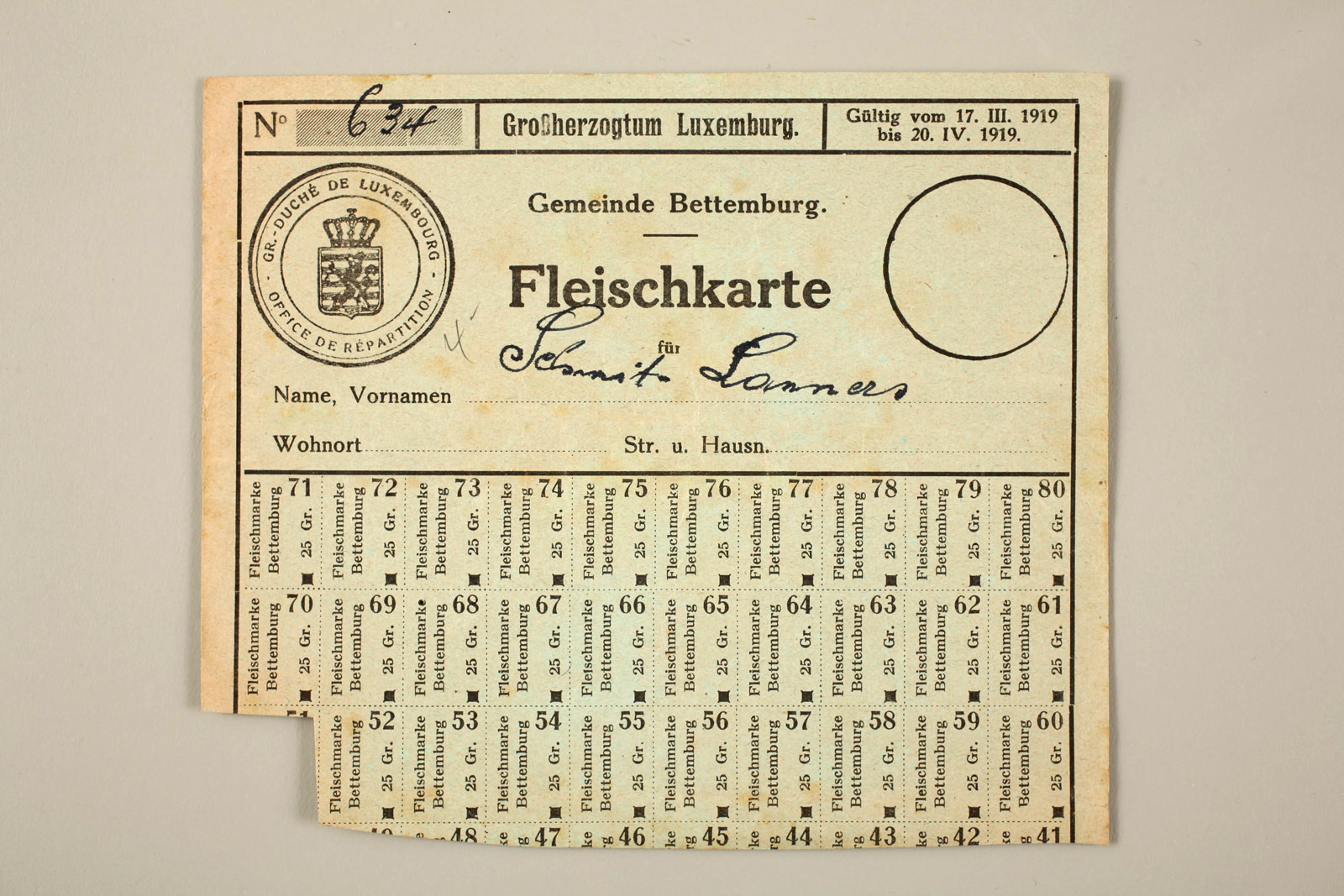
Ration cards from Luxembourg, from during and immediately after the war

The most pressing concern of the Luxembourgish government was that of food supply. The war had made importation of food an impossibility, and the needs of the German occupiers were inevitably placed before those of the Luxembourgish people. To slow the food supply's diminishment, Michel Welter, the Director-General for both agriculture and commerce, banned the export of food from Luxembourg. Furthermore, the government introduced rationing and price controls to counteract the soaring demand and to make food more affordable for poorer Luxembourgers. However, the measures did not have the desired effect. Increasing numbers of Luxembourgers turned to the black market, and, to the consternation of the Luxembourgish government, the German army of occupation seemed to do little to help. Moreover, the government accused Germany of aiding the development of the black market by refusing to enforce regulations, and even of smuggling goods themselves.

Through 1916, the food crisis deepened, compounded by a poor potato harvest across all of the Low Countries; in neighbouring Belgium, the harvest was between 30% and 40% down on the previous year. Although many Luxembourgers were on near-starvation level dietary intakes, the country managed to avoid famine. In part, this was due to a reduction of German soldiers' dependence upon local food sources, instead relying on imports from Germany.

Despite the avoidance of a famine, the Luxembourgish government lost much of the faith placed in it by the public and by the politicians. On 22 December, Michel Welter, the minister responsible, was censured by the Chamber of Deputies, which demanded his resignation. Thorn procrastinated, seeking any option but firing the leader of one of three major parties, but could find none. On 3 January 1917, Welter was fired, and replaced by another socialist, Ernest Leclère. Even after the change and von Tessmar's promise of his soldiers' better conduct in future, Léon Kauffmann was capable of citing thirty-six instances of German soldiers caught smuggling foodstuffs between March 1917 and June 1918.

=== Miners' strike ===
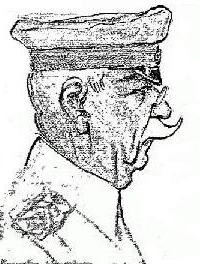
Von Tessmar's swift suppression of the strike undermined Thorn's government.

Discontent amongst the population grew constantly, particularly in the country's industrialised south. The autumn of 1916 had seen the first unionisation within the iron and steel industries, with trade unions springing up in both Luxembourg City and Esch-sur-Alzette. Despite the war demand, iron production had slumped, leading to greater employment insecurity. In March and April, three independents were elected as deputies from the canton of Esch-sur-Alzette, where the economy was dominated by iron and steel. As independents, these newly elected deputies were the only legislative opposition to the National Union Government.

For many Luxembourgers, particularly the miners, expression of disgust at the government could not be directed through the ballot box alone. Sensing the threat of civil disobedience or worse, von Tessmar threatened any individual committing an act of violence (in which he included strike action) with the death penalty. However, on 31 May 1917, the workers sought to use their most potent weapon, by defying von Tessmar's ultimatum and downing tools. Germany was dependent upon Luxembourgish iron, as the British Royal Navy's naval blockade forced Germany to look to accessible local supplies; in 1916, Luxembourg produced over one-seventh of the Zollverein's pig iron. As such, Germany simply could not afford a strike, lest it be deprived of critical raw materials.

In putting down the strike, von Tessmar was ruthlessly efficient, but he was not required to resort to the executions that he had threatened. Within nine days, the strike was defeated and the leaders arrested. The two ringleaders were then sentenced by German court-martial in Trier to ten years imprisonment, to the disgust of the government. The continued refusal of the German authorities to respect the Luxembourgish government, and the humiliating manner in which the strike was put down by German military muscle rather than the Luxembourgish gendarmerie, were too much for Thorn. On 19 June, the government resigned.

== Kauffmann government ==
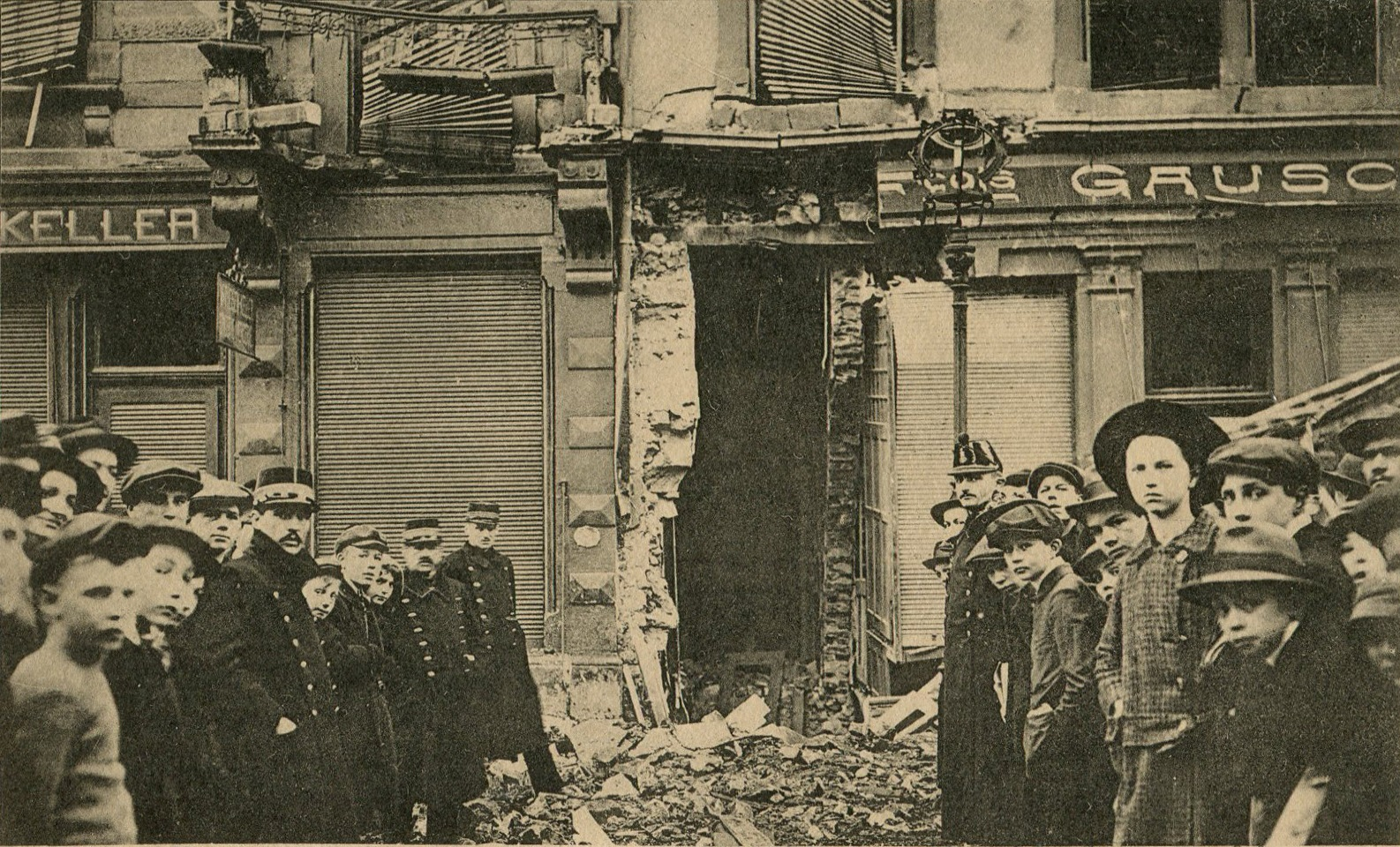
A house hit by a bomb, Rue de la Gare, 24 March 1918

Although the experiment in grand coalition had failed, the need for some political unity remained. As the National Union Government was collapsing, Kauffmann arranged an alliance between his Party of the Right and Moutrier's Liberal League, seeking to achieve change that would outlive the occupation. The primary objective was to address the perennial grievances of the left by amending the constitution; in November, the Chamber of Deputies launched a wide-ranging series of debates on various amendments to the constitutions. Ultimately, the constitution was amended to prohibit the government from entering into secret treaties, to improve deputies' pay (hitherto set at just 5 francs a day), to introduce universal suffrage, and to change the plurality voting system to a proportional one.

Whereas all of the above measures were broadly popular, across most of the political spectrum, the same was not true of the proposal to amend Article 32. Said article had not been amended in the overhaul of 1868, and its text had remained unchanged since the original constitution of 1848, stating unequivocally that all sovereignty resided in the person of the Grand Duchess. For some, particularly those that resented the close relations between Marie-Adélaïde and the German royalty, the idea of national sovereignty residing in such a person was unacceptable. The Chamber of Deputies voted to review Article 32, but Kauffmann refused to allow it, seeing the redefinition of the source of national sovereignty as covert republicanism.

The summer of 1918 saw a dramatic decline in the fortunes of the government. On 8 July, Clausen, in central Luxembourg City, had been bombed by the British Royal Air Force, killing ten civilians. Although this did not endear the Allies to Luxembourgers, the Grand Duchess' instinct was to run to the Germans, who were even less popular amongst the people. On 16 August, German Chancellor Georg von Hertling paid a visit to Luxembourg; although Hertling asked only to see the Grand Duchess, Kauffmann asked that he also attend. To the Luxembourgish people, relations between the two countries now seemed unambiguously cordial, and all that was left of Kauffmann's credibility disappeared. This was compounded further by the news on 26 August of the engagement of the Grand Duchess' sister, Princess Antonia, to Crown Prince Rupprecht of Bavaria, who was Generalfeldmarschall in the German army. Pressure mounted on Kauffmann; with his party still strong, but with his personal reputation shattered, he was left with no option but to resign, which he did on 28 September in favour of Émile Reuter, another conservative.

== End of the war ==
=== Armistice ===
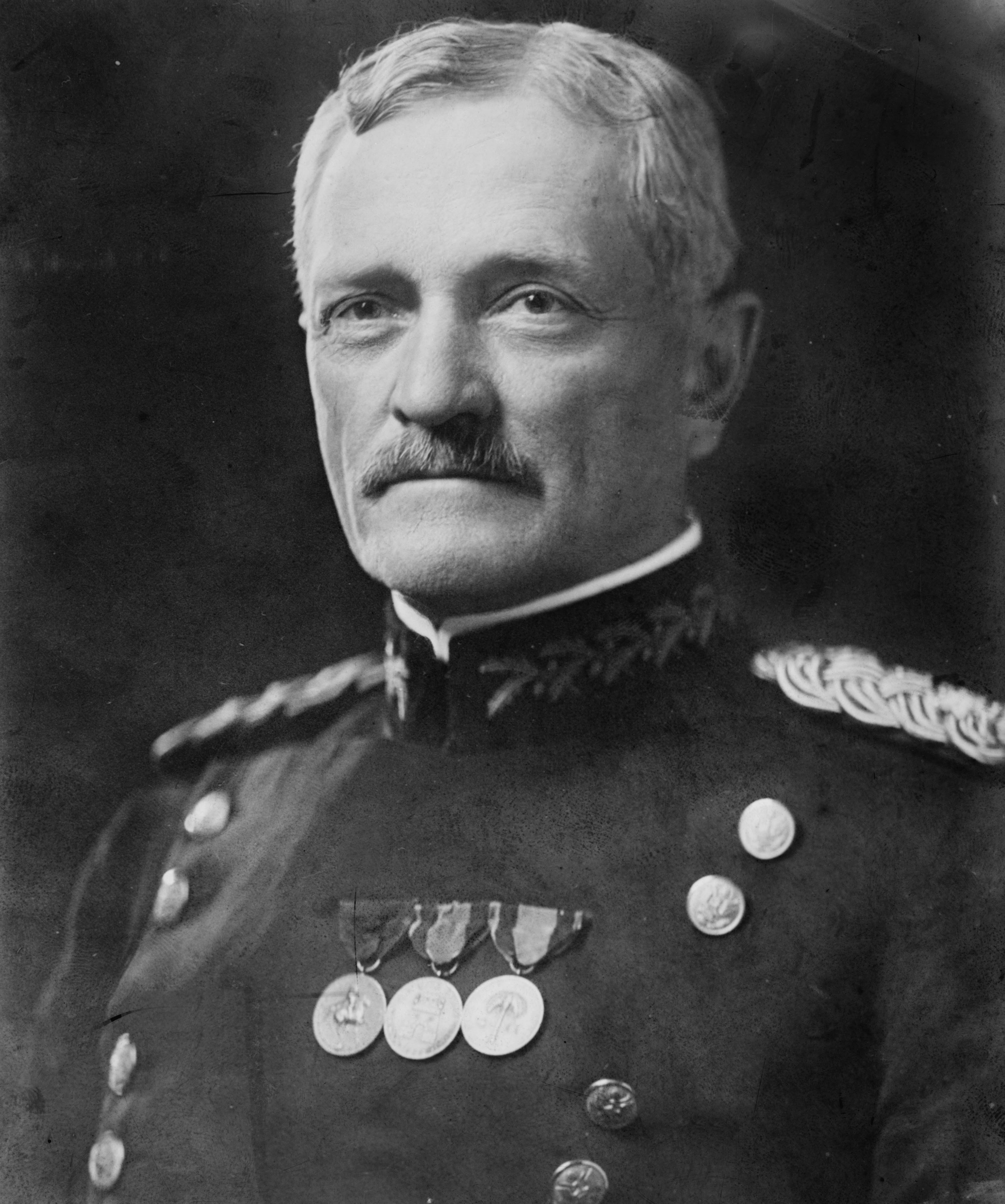
General John Joseph Pershing

The US 1st Division passes through Luxembourg city as viewed by General Pershing on November 22, 1918

By the autumn of 1918, Germany's position in the war was becoming untenable. The massive German spring offensive had been an unmitigated disaster, whereas the Allied counterattack, the Hundred Days Offensive, had driven the German Army back to its own borders. On 6 November, von Tessmar announced the full withdrawal of German soldiers from Luxembourg. Five days after von Tessmar's announcement, Germany signed an armistice, which brought an end to the war of four years. One of the terms of the armistice involved the withdrawal of German soldiers from Luxembourg, along with the other occupied countries.

The Allied powers agreed that the German withdrawal from Luxembourg would be observed by the United States, and that the United States would receive the honour of liberating the captive country. On 18 November, American General John Joseph "Black Jack" Pershing, Commander-in-Chief (C-in-C) of the American Expeditionary Force (AEF) on the Western Front, issued a proclamation to the people of Luxembourg, stating that the United States' new Third Army would move through Luxembourg to occupy the German Rhineland, but that the Americans would come as allies and as liberators,

After four years of violation of its territory, the Grand Duchy of Luxembourg is to be fortunately liberated. ... American troops enter the Grand Duchy of Luxembourg as friends, and will abide rigorously by international law. Their presence, which will not be extended longer than is absolutely necessary, will not be a burden upon you. The operation of the government and institutions will not be impeded. Your lives and livelihoods will not be disturbed. Your person and your property will be respected.

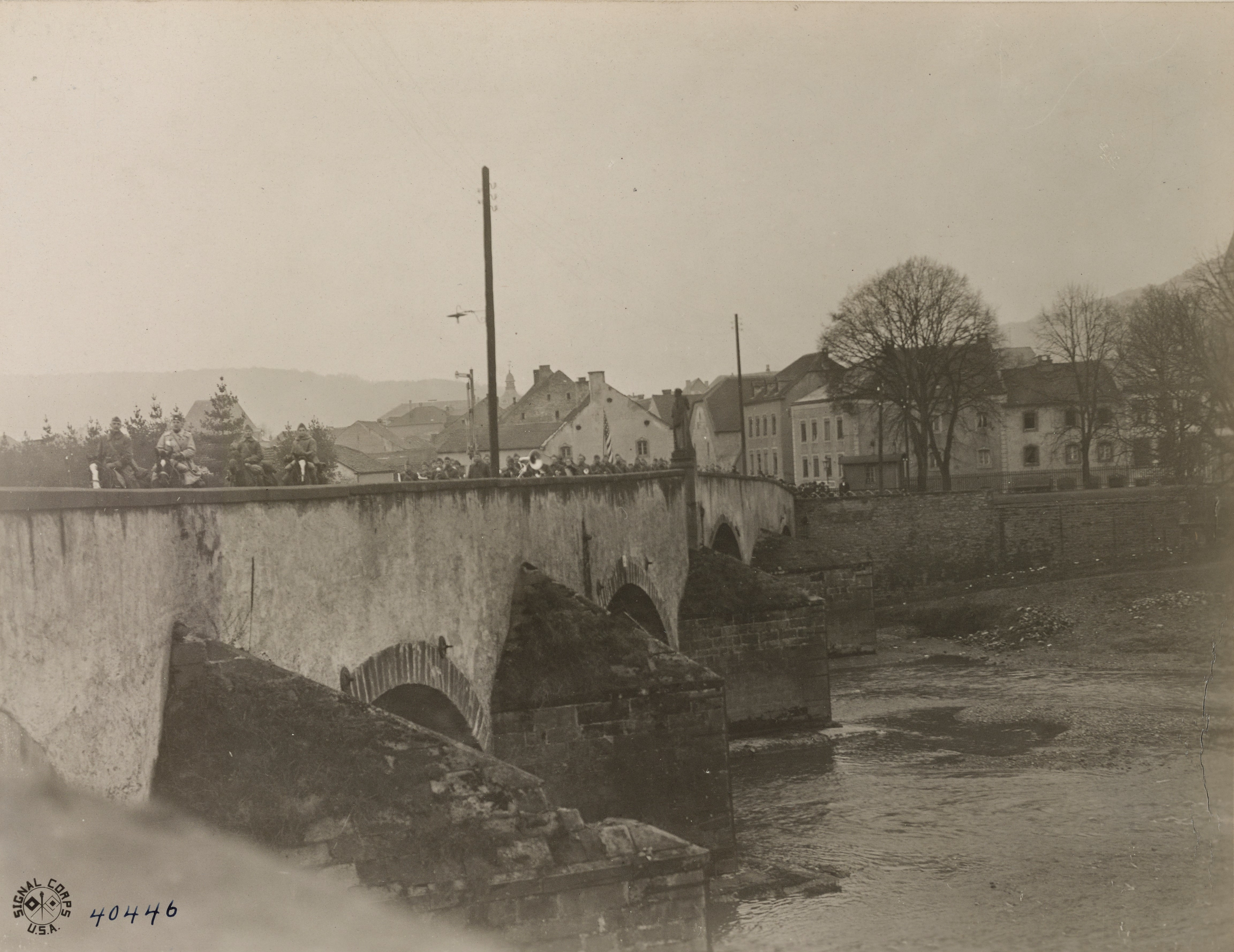
1 December 1918. Soldiers from the American 125th Infantry Regiment crossing the Sauer at Echternach, and becoming amongst the first Allied soldiers to enter Germany after the armistice.

The following day, American soldiers crossed the Franco–Luxembourgish border. They were fêted as liberators, in the spirit that Pershing had intended to inspire, and were met by bands and civilians waving flags, and were adorned with flowers. Luc Housse, the Mayor of Luxembourg City, told the advancing American army that the Germans had, on the whole, been disciplined and well-behaved in the previous three weeks, a marked improvement upon his numerous complaints earlier in the conflict. Finally, on 22 November 1918, the German army completed its withdrawal from Luxembourg, ending its occupation.

Germany's defeat created the perfect opportunity for the Allied powers to resolve the Luxembourgish question once and for all. By removing Luxembourg from Germany's sphere of influence, they hoped to guarantee its continued independence, and thus preserve the peace they had won. On 19 December, at the instigation of the British and French governments, the Luxembourgish government announced its withdrawal from the Zollverein and an end to the railway concessions that Luxembourg had previously granted Germany.

=== Rebellion ===
Although the Allies were satisfied at this remedy, at the time, the Luxembourgish government was threatened by a communist insurgency. After the retreat of the German army, revolutionaries established Russian-influenced Workers' councils across Luxembourg. On 10 November, the day after Karl Liebknecht and Rosa Luxemburg declared a similar 'socialist republic' in Germany, communists in Luxembourg City declared a republic, but it lasted for only a matter of hours. Another revolt took place in Esch-sur-Alzette in the early hours of 11 November, but also failed. The socialists had been fired up by the behaviour of Grand Duchess Marie-Adélaïde, whose interventionist and obstructive streak had stymied even Eyschen. On 12 November, socialist and liberal politicians, finding their old commonality on the issue, called for her abdication. A motion in the Chamber of Deputies demanding the abolition of the monarchy was defeated by 21 votes to 19 (with 3 abstentions), but the Chamber did demand the government hold a popular referendum on the issue.

Although the left's early attempts at founding a republic had failed, the underlying cause of the resentment had not been addressed, and, as long as Marie-Adélaïde was Grand Duchess, the liberals would ally themselves to the socialists in opposition to her. The French government also refused to cooperate with a government led by a so-called 'collaborator'; French Foreign Minister Stéphen Pichon called cooperation 'a grave compromise with the enemies of France'. More pressing than either of these troubles, on 9 January, a company of the Luxembourgish army rebelled, declaring itself to be the army of the new republic, with Émile Servais (the son of Emmanuel Servais) as 'Chairman of the Committee of Public Safety'. However, by January, the vacuum left by the German withdrawal had been filled by American and French soldiers. President of the Chamber François Altwies asked French troops to intervene. Eager to put an end to what it perceived to be pro-Belgian revolutions, the French army crushed the would-be revolutionaries.

Nonetheless, the disloyalty shown by her own armed forces was too much for Marie-Adélaïde, who abdicated in favour of her sister, Charlotte. Belgium, which had hoped to either annex Luxembourg or force it into personal union, grudgingly recognised Charlotte on 13 February. The dynasty's hold on power would be tenuous until September 1919, when a referendum on the future of the Grand Duchy found 77.8% in favour of continued rule by the House of Nassau-Weilburg.

=== Paris Peace Conference ===
Despite the armistice ending the war, and the end of the revolts, Luxembourg's own future was still uncertain. Belgium was one of the countries hit hardest by the war; almost the whole of the country was occupied by Germany, and over 43,000 Belgians, including 30,000 civilians, had died as a result. Belgium sought compensation, and had its eye on any and all of its neighbours; in November 1918, Lord Hardinge, the Permanent Secretary at the Foreign Office, told the Dutch ambassador in London, "The Belgians are on the make, and they want to grab whatever they can."

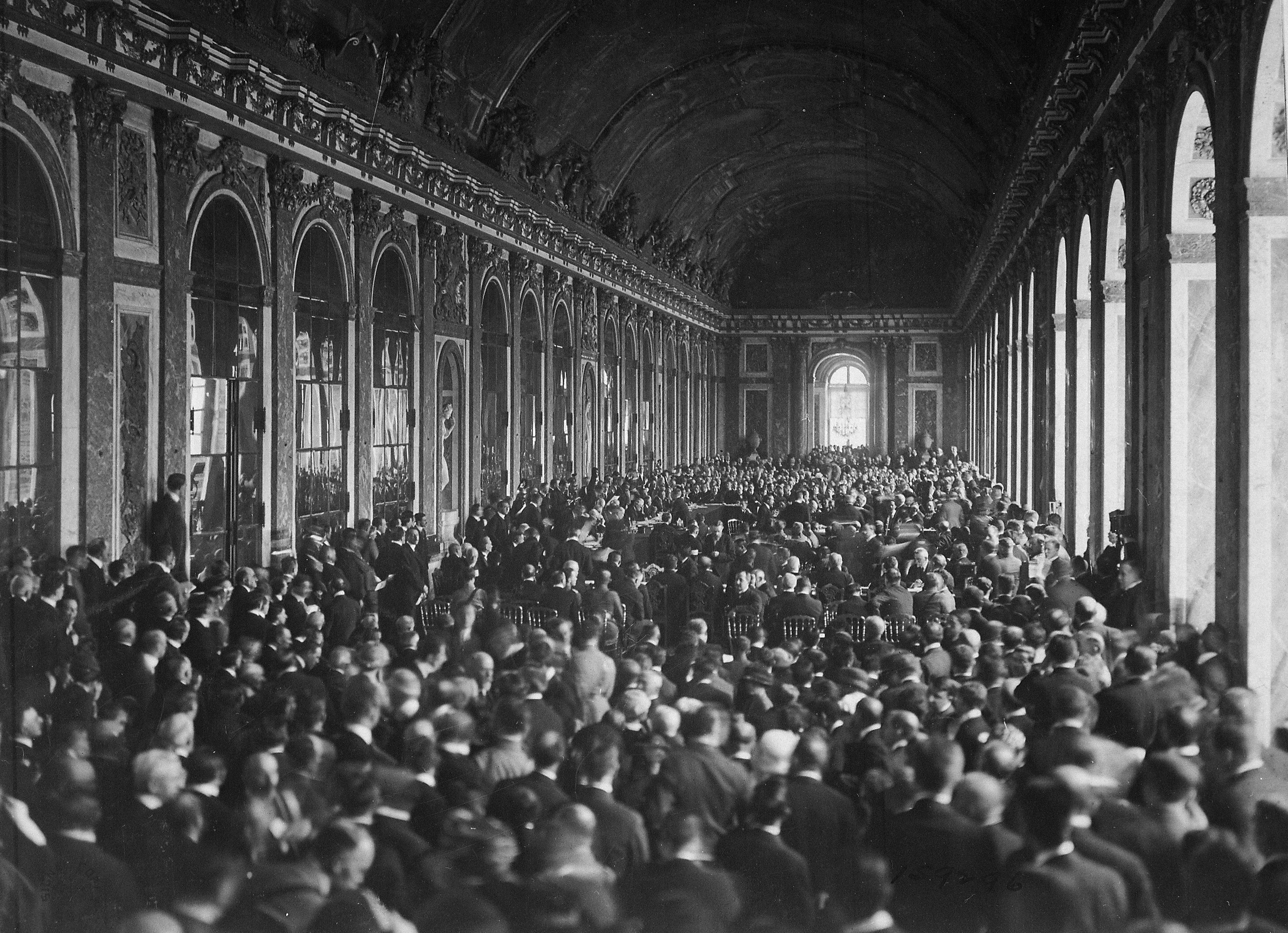
Delegates signing the Treaty of Versailles, ending the First World War and cementing Luxembourg's independence

From early 1919, Belgium engaged in a propaganda campaign to promote its vision of annexation. At the Paris Peace Conference, the Belgian delegation argued in favour of the international community allowing Belgium to annex Luxembourg. However, fearing loss of influence over the left bank of the Rhine, France rejected Belgium's overtures out of hand, thus guaranteeing Luxembourg's continued independence.

The resulting Treaty of Versailles set aside two articles (§40 and §41) to address concerns for Luxembourg's status. The main article, §40, revoked all special privileges that Germany had acquired in Luxembourg, with Germany specifically renouncing advantages gained in the treaties of 1842, 1847, 1865, 1866, February 1867, May 1867, 1871, 1872, and 1902. The effects of these treaties' revocation were then explicitly stated; Luxembourg would withdraw from the Zollverein, Germany would lose its right to use the Luxembourgish railways, and Germany was obligated to recognise the termination of Luxembourg's neutrality, thus validating the actions of the Luxembourgish government since the armistice. Furthermore, to prevent economic embargo after the end of the customs union, the treaty allowed Luxembourg an indefinite option on German coal, and prohibited Germany from levying duty on Luxembourgish exports until 1924.

== Luxembourgers overseas ==
The Gëlle Fra monument commemorates the thousands of Luxembourgers that volunteered for service in the armed forces of the Allies.

Thousands of Luxembourgers overseas, unconstrained by the Luxembourgish government's need to remain neutral, signed up to serve with foreign armies. 3,700 Luxembourgish nationals served in the French Army, of whom over 2,000 died. As Luxembourg's pre-war population was only 266,000, the loss of life solely in the service of the French army amounted to almost 1 per cent of the entire Luxembourgish population, relatively greater than the totals for many combatant countries (see: World War I casualties). The Luxembourgish volunteers are commemorated by the Gëlle Fra (literally 'Golden Lady' ) war memorial, which was unveiled in Luxembourg City on 27 May 1923. The original memorial was destroyed on 20 October 1940, during the Nazi occupation, as it symbolised the rejection of German identity and active resistance against Germanisation. After World War II, it was gradually rebuilt, culminating in its second unveiling, on 23 June 1985.

The Luxembourgish community in the United States found itself confronted by a crisis of identity. Traditionally, they had identified themselves as ethnically German, rather than as a separate community of their own. As such, they read German language newspapers, attended German schools, and lived amongst German Americans. Nonetheless, when it became apparent that the war would not be over quickly, the opinions of Luxembourg Americans changed; on 2 May 1915, the Luxemburger Brotherhood of America's annual convention decided to adopt English as its only official language. Other organisations were less inclined to change their ways; the Luxemburger Gazette opposed President Woodrow Wilson's supposed 'favouritism' towards the United Kingdom as late in the war as 1917. However, when the United States entered the war in April of that year, the wavering members of the community supported the Allies, changing forever the relationship between the German and Luxembourgish communities in the US.

== See also ==
- German occupation of Luxembourg during World War II

== Footnotes ==
Links to many of the cited primary sources, including speeches, telegrams, and despatches, can be found in the 'References' section.

== References and further reading ==
- (in French and German) German occupation of Luxembourg. GWPDA, 21 May 1998. Retrieved on 2006-07-23.
- Bellion, Joé (1 July 2013), "Luxemburger in der französischen Armee während des Ersten Weltkrieges" [Luxembourgers in the French Army during the First World War.], Hémecht (in German), vol. 65, no. 3, pp. 367–298
- Calmes, Christian (1989). The Making of a Nation From 1815 to the Present Day. Luxembourg City: Saint-Paul. OCLC 220806453.
- Dostert, Paul; Margue, Paul (September 2002). The Grand Ducal Family of Luxembourg (PDF). Luxembourg City: Service Information et Presse. ISBN 2-87999-018-1. Archived from the original (PDF) on 30 June 2006.
- Faber, Ernest (1932). Luxemburg im Kriege 1914–1918 (in German). Mersch, Luxembourg: Fr. Faber. OCLC 249843105.
- Hamdi, Mohamed (5 January 2018). "L'industrie lourde luxembourgeoise dans l'armement allemand" [Luxembourger heavy industry in German armaments]. d'Lëtzebuerger Land (in French). p. 11.
- Kreins, Jean-Marie (2003). Histoire du Luxembourg (in French) (3rd ed.). Paris: Presses Universitaires de France. ISBN 978-2-13-053852-3.
- Otte, Thomas (2014). July Crisis: The World's Descent into War, Summer 1914. Cambridge: Cambridge University Press. ISBN 978-1-1070-6490-4.
- O'Shaughnessy, Edith (1932). Marie Adelaide – Grand Duchess of Luxemburg, Duchess of Nassau. London: Jonathan Cape. OCLC 551606.
- Thewes, Guy (July 2003). Les gouvernements du Grand-Duché de Luxembourg depuis 1848 (PDF) (in French) (Édition limitée ed.). Luxembourg City: Service Information et Presse. ISBN 2-87999-118-8. Archived from the original (PDF) on 4 February 2004.
