= Henri Kirpach =

Luxembourgish politician and lawyer

Henri Kirpach (2 March 1841 – 25 April 1911) was a Luxembourgish politician and lawyer.

Kirpach was born in 1841 in Mamer. After studying in Heidelberg and Paris, he started business in Luxembourg City as a lawyer.

In 1870 he was first elected into the Chamber of Deputies.

On 6 August 1878 he became Director-General (Minister) for the Interior in the Blochausen Ministry. From 1885, he remained in this post in the Eyschen government, up until 1910.

His name is connected with the education law of 20 April 1881, also known as the loi Kirpach ("Kirpach law"), which made school attendance mandatory between the ages of 6 and 12. This reform provoked bitter debates over the role of the state in society and the relations between church and state. The law also provided for a single system of public schools, and made it the state's duty to organise education. At the same time, however, the church remained involved, since the local parish priest was an ex officio member of the local commune's school commission, and the schoolteacher was under his supervision.

On 1 January 1910 Henri Kirpach became a member of the Council of State.

He died in 1913 in Luxembourg City.

== Honours ==
- Grand Officer of the Order of the Oak Crown (1894)
