= Richard Karl von Tessmar =

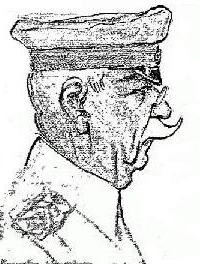
Caricature of von Tessmar

Generalmajor Richard Karl von Tessmar (1853–1928) was a German general.

He is notable primarily for his exploits during the First World War, during which he commanded the German forces occupying Luxembourg. He led the forces that captured Luxembourg City on the 2 August 1914, before establishing his command in the city. On 26 August, 121 Belgian civilians were executed at Arlon railway station on his order. His swift and heavy-handed suppression of a miners' strike in June 1917 led to the downfall of Victor Thorn's National Union Government.
