= Pulpit Law (Luxembourg) =

1879 Luxembourgish Penal Code prohibiting clergy criticism of government

The Pulpit Law (French: paragraphe de la chaire, German: Kanzelparagraph) was a paragraph of the Luxembourgish Penal Code introduced in 1879, restricting the rights of the clergy to criticise the government.

The law was passed by the Chamber of Deputies on 1 May 1879, and published in the government Mémorial on 30 August 1879.

It was part of the Blochausen government's reform of the Penal Code.

== Contents ==
Ministers of religions who, in speeches delivered or in writings read, in the exercise of their ministry, and in public assembly, or by a written document containing pastoral instructions in any form whatsoever, directly attack the Government, a law, a grand-ducal royal decree, or any other act of public authority, shall be punished with imprisonment from eight days to three months and a fine from twenty-six francs to five hundred francs. If the pastoral instruction, speech, or writing contains a direct incitement to disobedience to laws or other acts of public authority, or if it tends to stir up or arm one part of the citizens against others, the minister of religion who has published, spoken, or read it, shall be punished with imprisonment from three months to two years, if the incitement has not resulted in any effect, and with imprisonment from six months to three years, if it has led to disobedience, except that which has degenerated into sedition or revolt. The guilty party shall also be fined from one hundred francs to one thousand francs.

— Penal Code of Luxembourg, Chapt. VIII, Art. 268

== Context ==
The Pulpit Law should be seen in the context of the long-term relationship between the Church and State. Since the 1840s and the tenure of Bishop Laurent, for more than eighty years, the government and the Church lived in a kind of Cold War, a state of mutually suspicious co-existence and, at times, in open opposition to each other. Further examples of this opposition, aside from the Pulpit Law, are the school laws of 1881 and 1912.

The repercussions of this struggle between the State and the Church were to continue to shape the political history of Luxembourg, at least until the Second World War, and in many ways still to the present day.

A similar law, already called the Pulpit Law, had been passed in 1871 by the German Reichstag, in the context of the Kulturkampf.
