= Eyschen Ministry =

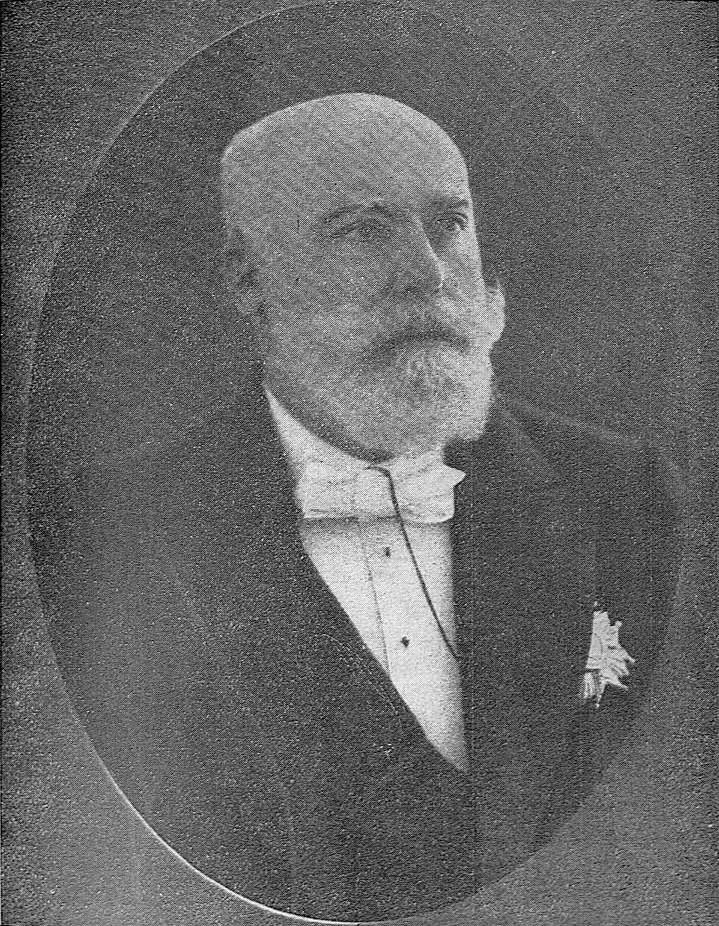
Paul Eyschen, prime minister of Luxembourg 1888-1915

The Eyschen Ministry was in office in Luxembourg for 27 years, from 22 September 1888 to 12 October 1915. It was headed by Paul Eyschen, and ended with his death.

== Foreign policy ==
=== Dynasty ===
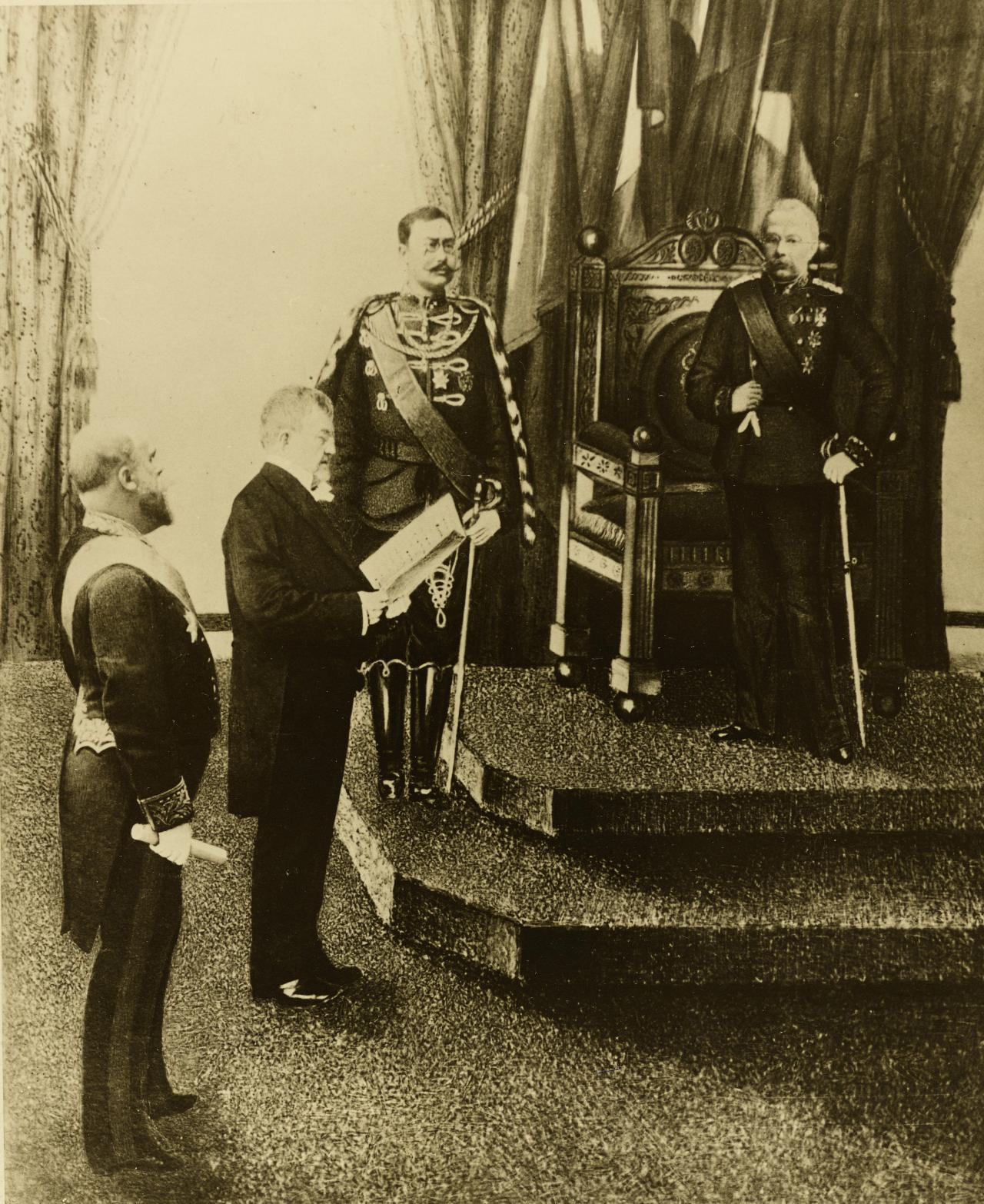
Adolphe, Grand Duke of Luxembourg

As soon as he became head of government, Eyschen faced the problem of the succession to the throne. William III's state of health had been growing worse since January 1889, which implied there would soon be a change of dynasty. Due to the Nassau Family Pact concluded in 1783 between the lines of the House of Nassau, and confirmed by the treaties of Vienna and London and adopted in the Constitution of Luxembourg, if there was no male descendant in the Orange-Nassau branch, the crown of the Grand Duchy would go to the descendants of the other branch of the House of Nassau, the Nassau-Weilburg branch. William III's only child was a daughter, Wilhelmina, who did indeed succeed him on the throne of the Netherlands. For the Grand Duchy, however, the legitimate heir was Adolphe, the Duke of Nassau.

Eyschen's predecessor, Félix de Blochausen, had been in favour of maintaining the personal union with the Netherlands, even after the death of William III. Eyschen on the other hand had Adolphe appointed regent as soon as William III could no longer perform his duties due to illness. Eyschen was seeking to pave the way for a change in dynasties, and avoid a "Luxembourg question" from cropping up when the king died.

Adolphe exercised the regency on two occasions, from 11 April to 3 May 1889, and from 4 to 23 November 1890, the day of William III's death. On 9 December, he took his oath on the Constitution as the Grand Duke. The first Nassau-Weilburg rulers hardly intervened in the government of the country at all, and mostly resided outside of Luxembourg. Adolphe was 73 years old when he became Grand Duke; William IV, who succeeded him in 1905, was bedridden due to illness. William had six girls and no sons, which caused the issue of succession to raise its head again. In 1907, Eyschen put a law through the legislature declaring William's eldest daughter Princess Marie-Adélaïde the rightful successor. The new ruling family's restraint contrasted with the autocratic regime of the house of Orange-Nassau, and allowed the Eyschen government a large amount of discretion. The fact that Luxembourg now had a national dynasty was another step towards the country's political emancipation on the international stage. From now on, foreign diplomats were accredited to the Grand Ducal court and its government in Luxembourg.

=== Economic dependence ===
While the country's political independence was reinforced by dynastic happenings, Luxembourg's economic dependence on other countries increased during the same period. Germany's "peaceful penetration" of Luxembourg took on new dimensions during the Eyschen government.

The development of a powerful steel industry in Luxembourg was made possible with German capital, skills, and labour. German immigrants as a proportion of the Luxembourg population went from 1,7% in 1875 to 8,4% in 1910. They were the largest group of foreigners in the Grand Duchy. Key posts in the economy, such as that of the director of the customs administration or the railway administration, were held by Germans. In 1902, the governments of Luxembourg and the German Empire, with an eye to the customs and railway treaty which was to expire in 1912, renewed it until 1959. Luxembourg seemed firmly anchored in the German sphere of influence for the next half-century. In their correspondence, German diplomats referred to the deference and docility of the Luxembourgish government towards Germany, and did not hesitate to term the Grand Duchy a German "protectorate".

=== World War I ===
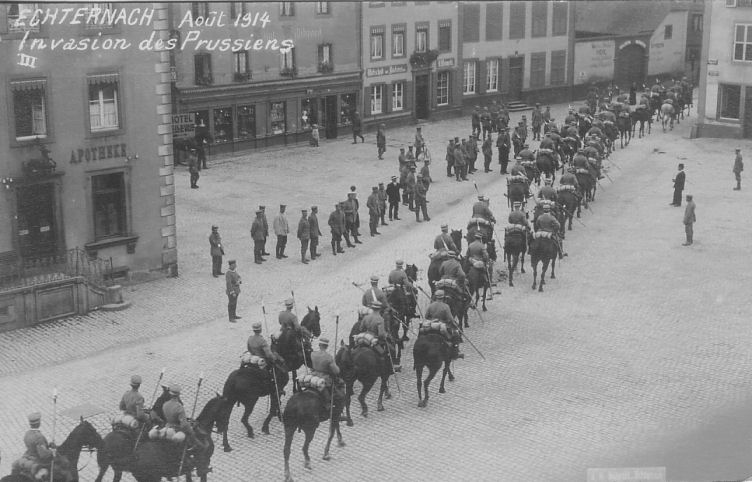
German troops entering Echternach, August 1914

At the beginning of the 20th century, international tensions mounted. The government sought refuge behind its status of neutrality, which it hoped would guarantee the country's independence. In 1899, then in 1907, Eyschen, participated in two conferences in The Hague on disarmament, where he sought to advance the cause of neutral states. It was a great shock when on 2 August 1914, the German army invaded the country, following the strategy in the Schlieffen Plan. The Luxembourg government protested against the violation of its borders, but continued to observe a policy of strict neutrality towards all belligerents. The German government gave a response that was meant to be reassuring, but the secret plans of the German army headquarters listed Luxembourg as one of the territorial aims of the war. Meanwhile, the German occupation was limited to the military sphere. The occupying power did not (except on rare occasions) intervene in the functioning of the Luxembourgish state, which continued to operate almost as before. Eyschen, for his part, continued with his policy of strict neutrality, holding back from denouncing the Zollverein. In order to preserve the population from the effects of the war as much as possible, the government opted for a policy of cohabitation with the occupiers.

== Domestic policy ==
=== Education ===
Towards the late 19th century, it appeared clear that the traditional education system in Luxembourg was no longer fit to serve the new society that had emerged from the Industrial Revolution. Economic developments brought forth new social and professional classes. A middle class of employees and civil servants emerged from the growth of state services and administration. Artisanship and trade were transformed by industrial and commercial progress. Through a far-reaching reform of the education system, Eyschen's government attempted to respond to these changes in society. Eyschen defended the idea of specialised schools: the Athénée de Luxembourg for those intending to later pursue university studies, an industrial school for those destined for a technical occupation, an agriculture school for farmers' sons, and a craftwork school for the sons of craftsmen. Particular attention was given to vocational education.

The law of 1892 split off the industrial school from the Athénée and added to it a commercial section; the law of 1896 created an artisanal school. These efforts were accompanied by an increase in students attending secondary school under the Eyschen government: 875 in 1879-1880 compared to 2500 in 1919-1920.

The government also tackled primary education through the Education Law of 1912. This abolished school fees, and made school mandatory for 7 years. Most controversially, it rolled back the Church's position in schools: teachers no longer needed a certificate of morality from their priest to be employed, and were no longer obliged to teach religious education. The law of 1912 was the subject of bitter arguments between the Left Bloc (socialists and liberals) and the clerical Right.

=== Economic and social policy ===
As in other countries at the time, the social question was being raised by the development of modern industry. In the 1880s, the neighbouring German Empire under Otto von Bismarck had started expanding the role of the state through a series of laws introducing health insurance, accident insurance and old age and invalidity insurance. During his time as chargé d'affaires in Berlin, Eyschen had been friends with the Chancellor's son, and was well aware of this legislation. When he became prime minister, he set about introducing something similar in Luxembourg. The government had long been reluctant to intervene in economic affairs, dominated as it was by liberals, but Luxembourg was to follow the German model.

In terms of wages, truck wages were outlawed in 1895, together with the payment of wages in shops or bistros. The law of 1891 gave a legal basis to mutual aid societies. In the early 20th century, a series of laws introduced obligatory insurance for workers: health insurance in 1901, accident insurance in 1902, and invalidity and old age insurance in 1911. The inspectorate of work and mines was established in 1902. The emergence of large steelworks brought the question of workers' accommodation, and the law of 1906 created financial aid for the purchase or construction of small homes. In 1897, a reform of social assistance (the “domicile of relief”) was carried out, and in 1914 the retirement age was brought down from 68 to 65.

Alongside the working classes, the Eyschen government's attention was drawn to the new middle classes, and especially civil servants, whose number increased from 1,500 (1889) to 3,500 (1913). In 1912 it set up a Contingency Fund for Communal Functionaries. In 1913, a new status was established for public sector workers, guaranteeing a better recruitment, and a salary review led to an improvement in civil servants' material quality of life. Eyschen used the term "distributive justice" in defending this reform which reduced inequalities between senior and junior civil servants.

=== Agriculture and viticulture ===
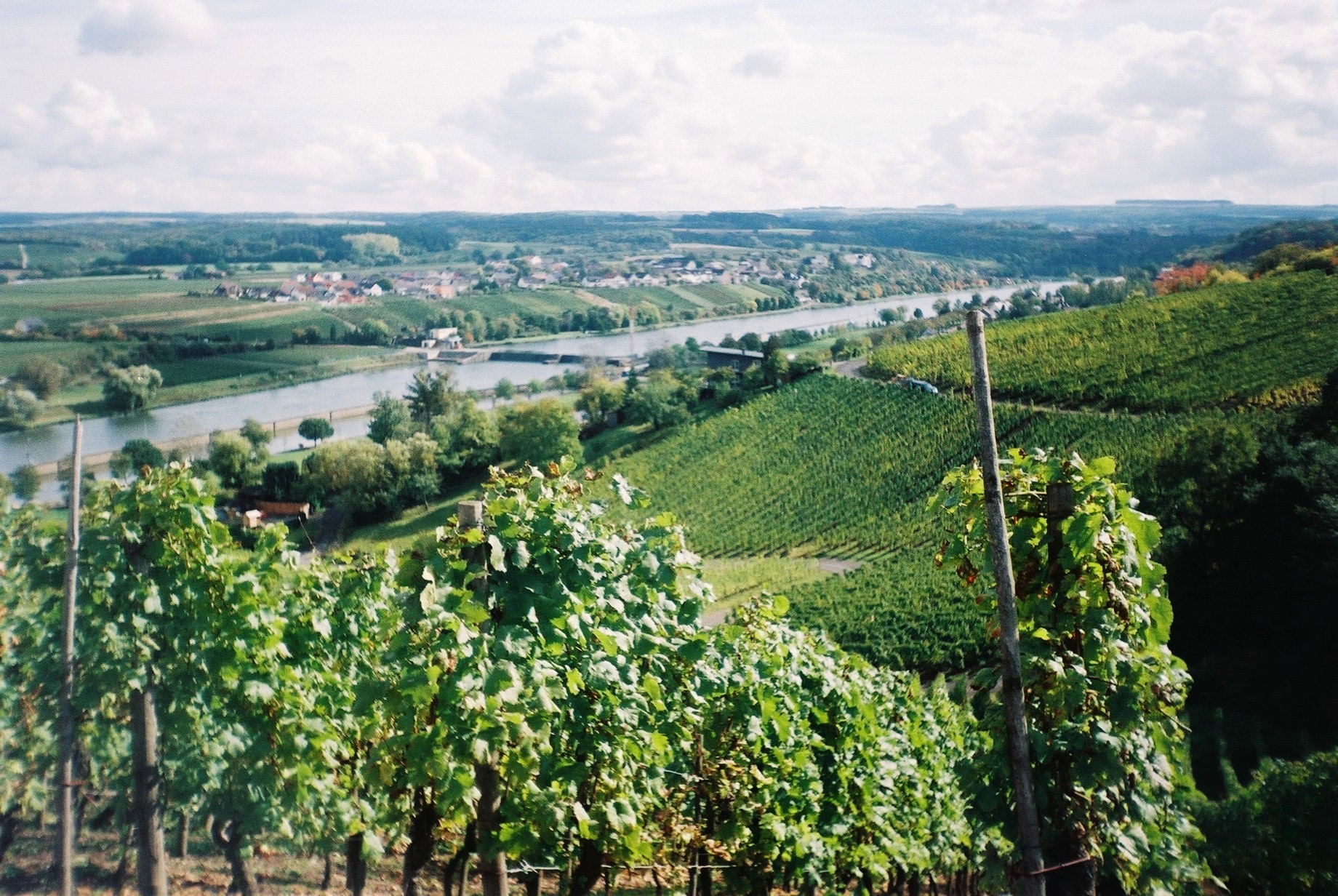
Wine-growing near Stadtbredimus

During the Eyschen years, Luxembourgish agriculture made great progress. The government played a large role in these developments by improving agricultural education, encouraging improvements in breeding and crop-growing techniques, facilitating the creation of farmers' cooperatives, and encouraging the use of chemical fertiliser. The steel industry gave Luxembourgish farmers a fertiliser that was cheap and efficient: the cinders from the Gilchrist–Thomas process. The government obliged the steel companies to provide the cinders from this procedure to farmers at a discounted rate, and made the attribution of new mining concessions conditional on them doing so. The government also encouraged wine-growers to turn towards producing quality wines. In 1909, a law and a Grand Ducal decree provided a new legal and regulatory framework for wine production. In 1892, the creation of a plant pathology service had already helped combat phylloxera.

== Composition ==
=== 22 September 1888 to 26 October 1892 ===
- Paul Eyschen: Minister of State, prime minister, Director-General for Foreign Affairs
- Henri Kirpach: Director-General for the Interior
- Mathias Mongenast: Director-General for Finance
- Victor Thorn: Director-General for Public Works

=== 26 October 1892 to 23 June 1896 ===
- Paul Eyschen: Minister of State, prime minister, Director-General for Foreign Affairs, provisionally also for Public Works
- Henri Kirpach: Director-General for the Interior
- Mathias Mongenast: Director-General for Finance

=== 23 June 1896 to 25 October 1905 ===
- Paul Eyschen: Minister of State, prime minister, Director-General for Foreign Affairs, (Agriculture and Wine-growing)
- Henri Kirpach: Director-General for the Interior (Primary and Normal Schools)
- Mathias Mongenast: Director-General for Finance (Higher and Middle Schools)
- Charles Rischard: Director-General for Public Works

=== 25 October 1905 to 9 January 1910 ===
- Paul Eyschen: Minister of State, prime minister, Director-General for Foreign Affairs, (Agriculture and Wine-growing)
- Henri Kirpach: Director-General for the Interior (Primary and Normal Schools)
- Mathias Mongenast: Director-General for Finance (Higher and Middle Schools)
- Charles de Waha: Director-General for Public Works

=== 9 January 1910 to 3 March 1915 ===
- Paul Eyschen: Minister of State, prime minister, Director-General for Foreign Affairs, (Agriculture and Wine-growing)
- Mathias Mongenast: Director-General for Finance (Higher and Middle Schools)
- Charles de Waha: Director-General for Public Works
- Pierre Braun: Director-General for the Interior (Primary and Normal Schools)

=== 3 March 1915 to 12 October 1915 ===
- Paul Eyschen: Minister of State, prime minister, Director-General for Foreign Affairs, (Culture, Agriculture and Wine-growing)
- Mathias Mongenast: Director-General for Finance (Higher and Middle Schools)
- Victor Thorn: Director-General for Justice and Public Works
- Ernest Leclère: Director-General for the Interior (Primary and Normal Schools)

== References and further reading ==
- Thewes, Guy (2011). Les gouvernements du Grand-Duché de Luxembourg depuis 1848 (PDF) (in French). Service Information et Presse. pp. 52–63. ISBN 978-2-87999-212-9. Archived (PDF) from the original on 2017-01-11.
- Moes, Régis (January 2013). "La réforme scolaire de 1912" (PDF). Forum (in French) (325): 35–38.
