= Ernest Leclère =

Luxembourgish politician

Member of Chamber of Deputies

Minister of Agriculture, Commerce and Industry
- In office January 3, 1917 – June 19, 1917

Director-General for the Interior
- In office March 3, 1915 – November 6, 1915
- Prime Minister: Paul Eyschen

Personal details
- Born: April 22, 1865 Luxembourg City, Luxembourg
- Died: May 27, 1938 (aged 73) Luxembourg City, Luxembourg
- Party: POS
- Occupation: Politician, lawyer

Ernest Leclère (April 22, 1865 – May 27, 1938) was a Luxembourgish politician. A member of Luxembourg's Chamber of Deputies for the Socialist Party, he served two short stints as a minister during the German occupation during the First World War. His first position was as the Director-General for the Interior from 3 March 1915 until 6 November 1915. Later he served in the first National Union Government as Director-General for Agriculture, Commerce, and Industry from 3 January 1917 until 19 June 1917.
