= Paul Eyschen =

Prime Minister of Luxembourg from 1888 to 1915

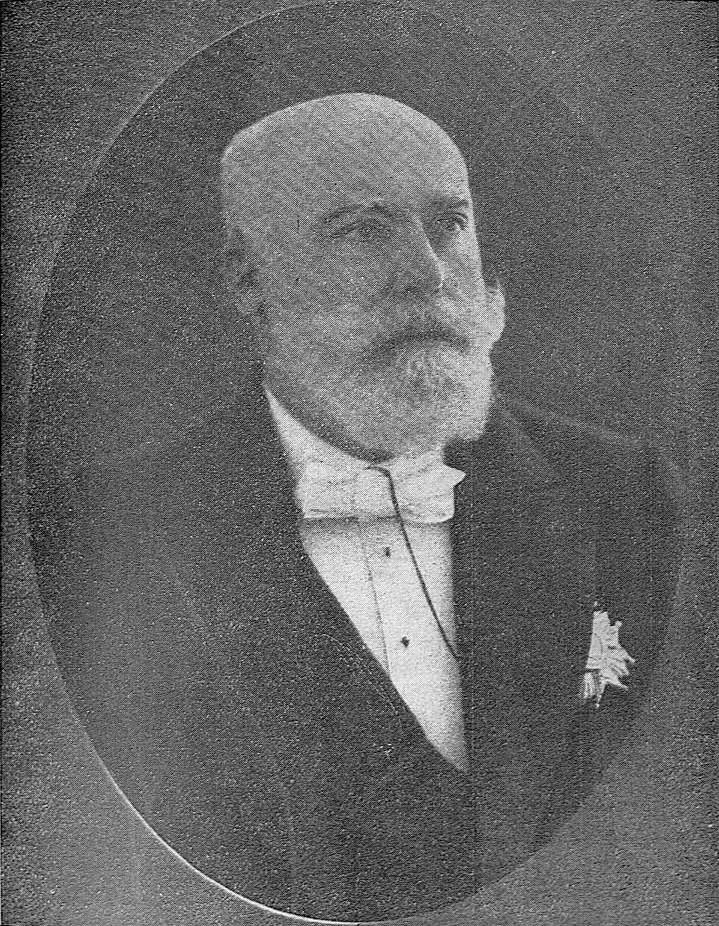

Prime Minister of Luxembourg
- In office 22 September 1888 – 11 October 1915
- Monarchs: William III; Adolphe; William IV; Marie-Adélaïde
- Preceded by: Édouard Thilges
- Succeeded by: Mathias Mongenast

Personal details
- Born: 9 September 1841 Diekirch, Luxembourg
- Died: 11 October 1915 (aged 74) Luxembourg City, Luxembourg
- Party: Independent

Paul Eyschen (9 September 1841 – 11 October 1915) was a Luxembourgish politician, statesman, lawyer, and diplomat. He was the longest-serving prime minister of Luxembourg, serving for twenty-seven years, from 1888 until his death in 1915.

== Early life ==
The son of Charles-Gérard Eyschen, a former Director-General for Justice, Eyschen was born in Diekirch, in northern Luxembourg, on 9 September 1841. Eyschen graduated in 1860 from the Athénée de Luxembourg. Eyschen became a lawyer after studying Law in Bonn and Paris. He was admitted to the bar on 9 November 1865.

== Career ==
At the elections of 12 June 1866, Eyschen was elected to Chamber of Deputies, representing the canton of Wiltz. However, he was not yet 25 years old on the day of the vote, as required by the constitution. His election victory was first annulled by the Chamber on the initiative of Félix de Blochausen, but when the now-vacant seat was put up again for election on 10 November, he won it back and, being 25, he kept it.

In 1875, he was appointed Chargé d'Affaires to the German Empire, in which capacity he served until 1888.

== Prime minister ==
On 7 July 1876, Eyschen emulated his father by becoming Director-General for Justice, a position he held until 1888, when, upon the resignation of Édouard Thilges, Eyschen was appointed Prime Minister. For the following 27 years, Eyschen dominated Luxembourgish political life, holding sway over a succession of monarchs and overseeing an era of economic resurgence and the end of the personal union with the Netherlands.

=== Education ===
Towards the late 19th century, it appeared clear that the traditional education system in Luxembourg was no longer fit to serve the new society as it was since the Industrial Revolution. Economic developments brought forth new social and professional classes. A middle class of employees and civil servants emerged from the growth of state services and administration. Manufacturing and trade were transformed by industrial and commercial progress. Through a far-reaching reform of the education system, Eyschen's government attempted to respond to these changes in society. Eyschen advocated the idea of a specialisation of schools: the Athénée de Luxembourg for those intending to later pursue university studies, an industrial school for those destined for a technical occupation, an agriculture school for farmers' sons, and a craftwork school for the sons of craftsmen. Particular attention was given to vocational education.

The law of 1892 split off the industrial school from the Athénée and added to it a commercial section; the law of 1896 created an artisanal school. These efforts were accompanied by an increase in students attending secondary school under the Eyschen government: 875 in 1879–1880 compared to 2500 in 1919–1920.

The government also tackled primary education through the Education law of 1912. This abolished school fees and made school mandatory for seven years. Most controversially, it rolled back the Church's position in schools: teachers no longer needed a certificate of morality from their priest to be employed and were no longer obliged to teach religious education. The law of 1912 was the subject of bitter arguments between the Left Bloc (socialists and liberals) and the clerical Right.

=== Economic and social policy ===
As in other countries at the time, the social question was being raised by the development of modern industry. The neighbouring German Empire under Bismarck had, in the 1880s, started expanding the role of the state through the enactment of laws introducing health insurance, accident insurance and old age and invalidity insurance. Eyschen had been chargé d'affaires in Berlin and had been friends with the Chancellor's son, and was well aware of this legislation. When he became prime minister, he set about introducing something similar in Luxembourg. The government had long been reluctant to intervene in economic affairs, dominated as it was by liberals, but Luxembourg was to follow the model of its neighbour to the East.

The law of 1891 gave a legal basis to mutual aid societies. In the early 20th century, a series of laws introduced obligatory insurance for workers: health insurance in 1901, accident insurance in 1902, and invalidity and old age insurance in 1911. The inspectorate of work and mines was established in 1902. The emergence of large steelworks brought the question of workers' accommodation. The law of 1906 created financial aid for the purchase or construction of small homes.

=== Language ===
Eyschen was a great lover of the Luxembourgish language, which was then still regarded as a dialect, and was one of its earliest advocates. In 1903 he had the Dicks–Lentz Monument built, to honour the two national poets of Luxembourg Michel Lentz (1820–1893) and Edmond de la Fontaine (1823–1891), a.k.a. "Dicks".

== Death ==
Eyschen died, whilst still in office, on 11 October 1915, one year into the German occupation during the First World War. He was succeeded by his long-term Director-General for Finances and ally, Mathias Mongenast. For a long time, due to the unexpected nature of his death at a difficult time for him, there were rumours that he had taken his own life.

After Eyschen's death, the country faced a series of government crises. For a long time, his strong personality had masked the deep divisions in the Luxembourgish political world. From the turn of the century, political debates became more and more obstinate. In 1908, liberals and socialists had formed the Left Bloc, an alliance between representatives of industry and of the workers, bound together by anti-clericalism. The Bloc had a solid majority in the Chamber. However, the power ratio was changed by the war and its various hardships. Faced with social tensions due to the poor food supply situation and price increases, the left-wing alliance crumbled, while the Party of the Right gained in popularity.

== See also ==
- Eyschen Ministry

== Footnotes ==
Political offices
Preceded by Alphonse Funck	Director-General for Justice; 1876–1915	Succeeded by Victor Thorn
Preceded by Édouard Thilges	Prime Minister of Luxembourg; 1888–1915	Succeeded by Mathias Mongenast
Preceded by Édouard Thilges	Director-General for Foreign Affairs; 1888–1915	Succeeded by Mathias Mongenast
Preceded by Victor Thorn	Director-General for Public Works; 1892–1896	Succeeded by Charles Rischard
