= Mathias Mongenast =

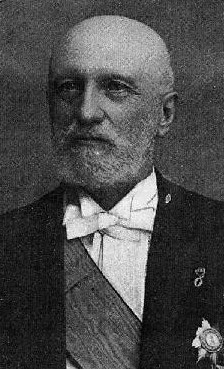

Prime Minister of Luxembourg
- In office 12 October 1915 – 6 November 1915
- Monarch: Marie-Adélaïde
- Preceded by: Paul Eyschen
- Succeeded by: Hubert Loutsch

Personal details
- Born: 12 July 1843 Diekirch, Luxembourg
- Died: 10 January 1926 (aged 82) Luxembourg City, Luxembourg
- Party: Independent

Mathias Mongenast (12 July 1843 – 10 January 1926) was a Luxembourgish politician. He was the shortest-serving prime minister of Luxembourg, serving for twenty-five days, from 12 October 1915 until 6 November 1915. He was the director-general (Minister) of Finance from October 1882 to November 1915.

== See also ==
- Mongenast Ministry

Political offices
Preceded by Baron de Blochausen	Director-General for Finances; 1882–1915	Succeeded by Edmond Reiffers
Preceded by Paul Eyschen	Prime Minister of Luxembourg; 1915	Succeeded by Hubert Loutsch
Preceded by Paul Eyschen	Director-General for Foreign Affairs; 1915	Succeeded by Hubert Loutsch
Preceded by Victor Thorn	President of the Council of State; 1916–1917	Succeeded by Victor Thorn
