= Luxembourgish art =

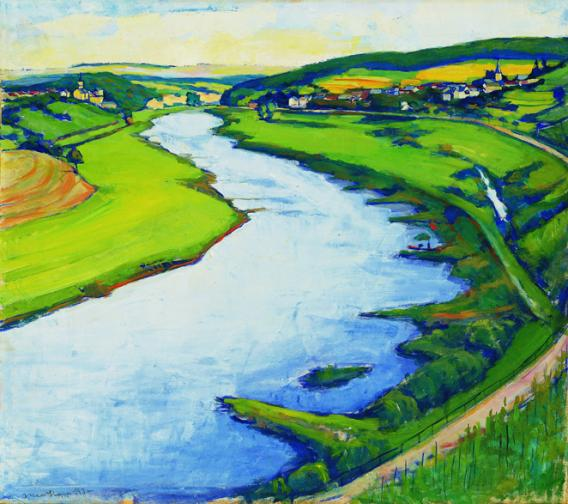
Nico Klopp: Stretch of the Moselle at Greiveldange with Stadtbredimus (1930)

Luxembourgish art can be traced back to Roman times, especially as depicted in statues found across the country and in the huge mosaic from Vichten. Over the centuries, Luxembourg's churches and castles have housed a number of cultural artifacts but these are nearly all ascribed to foreign artists. The first examples of art with a national flavour are paintings and maps of the City of Luxembourg and its fortifications from the end of the 16th until the beginning of the 19th century, although these too were mostly created by foreign artists. Real interest in art among the country's own citizens began in the 19th century with paintings of Luxembourg and the surroundings after the country became a grand duchy in 1815. This was followed by interest in Impressionism and Expressionism in the early 20th century, the richest period in Luxembourg painting, while Abstraction became the focus of art after the Second World War. Today there are a number of successful contemporary artists, some of whom have gained wide international recognition.

== Antiquity ==
A considerable number of sculptures and statues have been found in the ruins of Roman villas in various parts of Luxembourg, but the outstanding artistic treasure of the period is the Vichten mosaic which depicts the ancient Greek muses. It used to adorn the reception hall of a Roman villa in Vichten but can now be seen in Luxembourg's National Museum of History and Art. Other notable artefacts from the second century include a terracotta goblet decorated with a relief of a hunting scene found in a tomb near Mamer, a statue and a relief of the Romano-Celtic goddess Epona found at Dalheim Ricciacum, as well as bronze statues of Jupiter and Mercury.

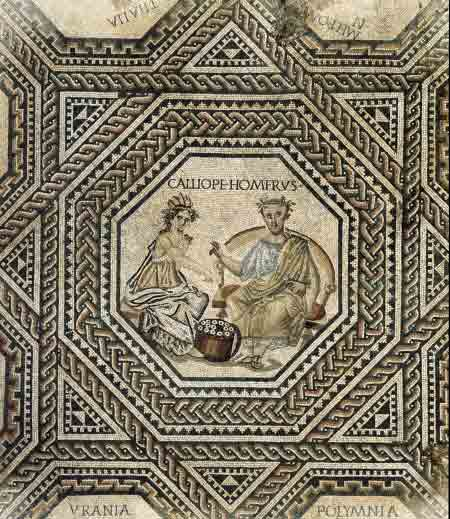
Vichten mosaic showing Calliope and Homer (c. 270 AD)

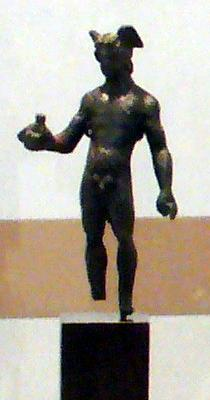
Bronze statue of Mercury

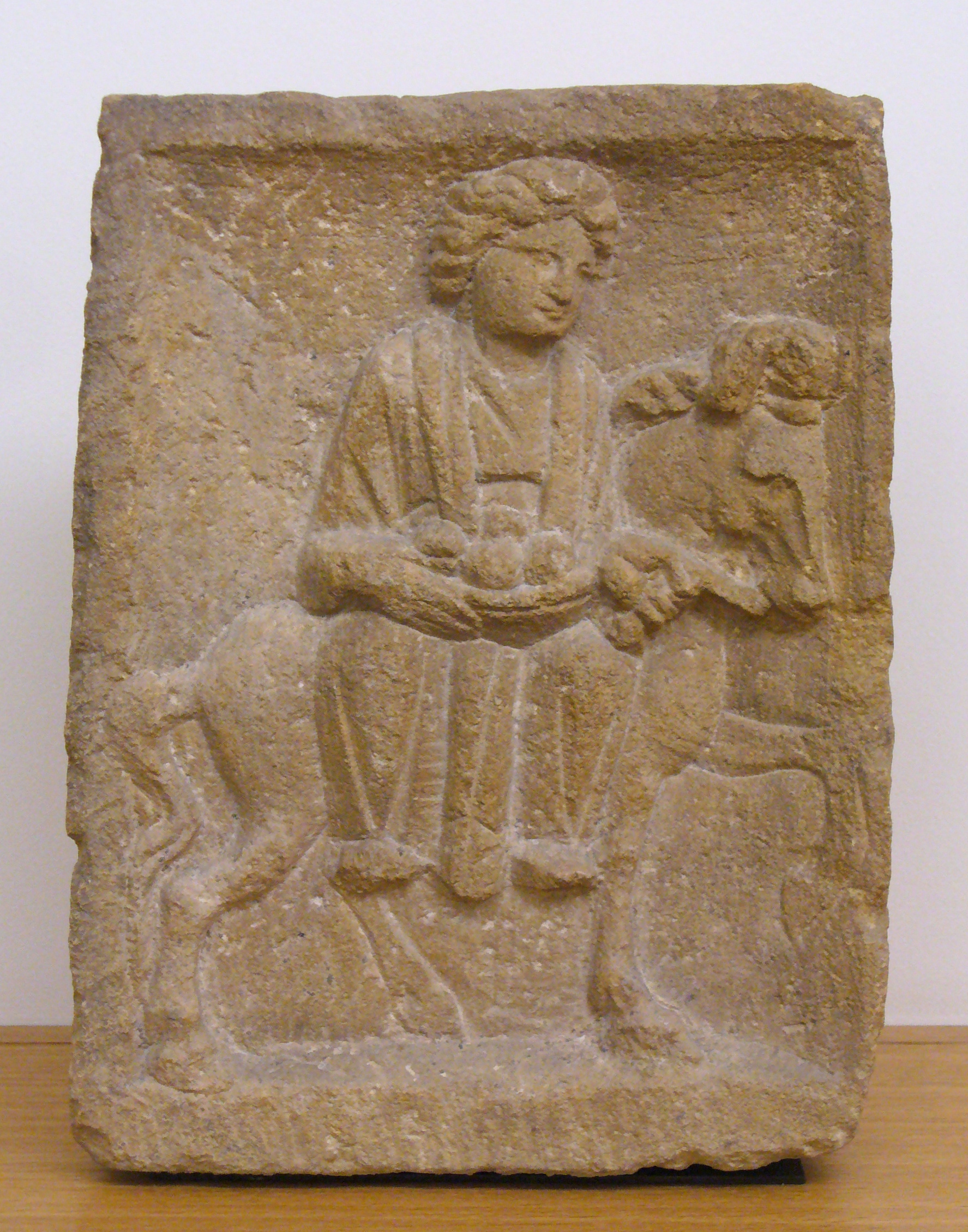
Relief of the Gallo-Roman goddess Epona, protector of livestock

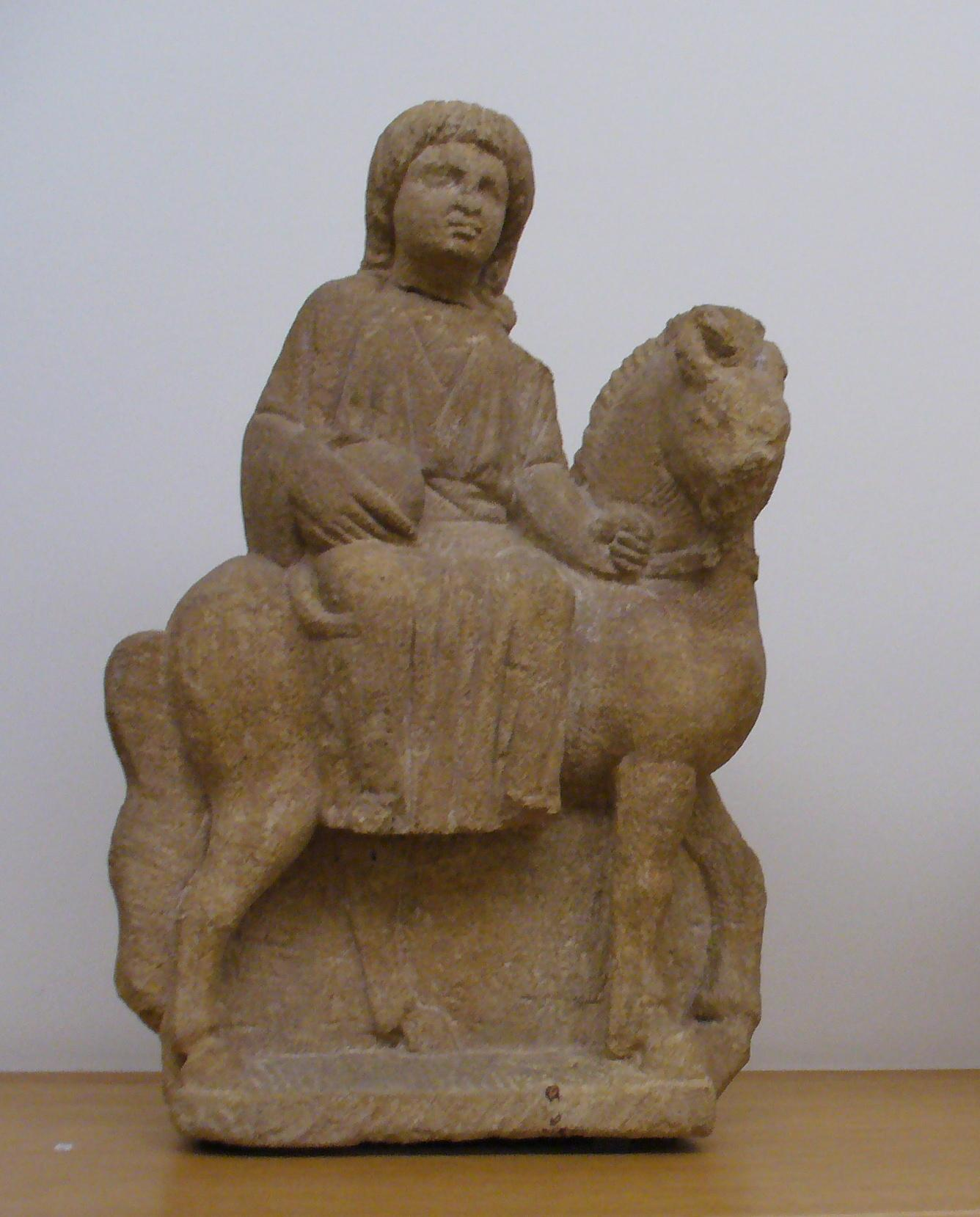
Statue of Epona

== Echternach illuminated Gospel Book ==
The Codex Aureus of Echternach is an early 11th-century illuminated Gospel Book containing the Vulgate versions of the four gospels. One of the most lavishly illustrated Ottonian manuscripts, it was produced at the Abbey of Echternach under the direction of Abbot Humbert. The refined Echternach style of painting is characterized by rich colouring, clear shapes and careful accentuation of the figures, interpreting the art of the Master of Trier with considerable originality. The Echternach illuminators drew on the style and iconography of much older works found in the libraries of Trier and Reichenau. The Codex Aureus is one of just two manuscripts which was kept at Echternach over the centuries, most of the others being produced for the Holy Roman Emperor Henry III. It is now in the German National Museum in Nuremberg.

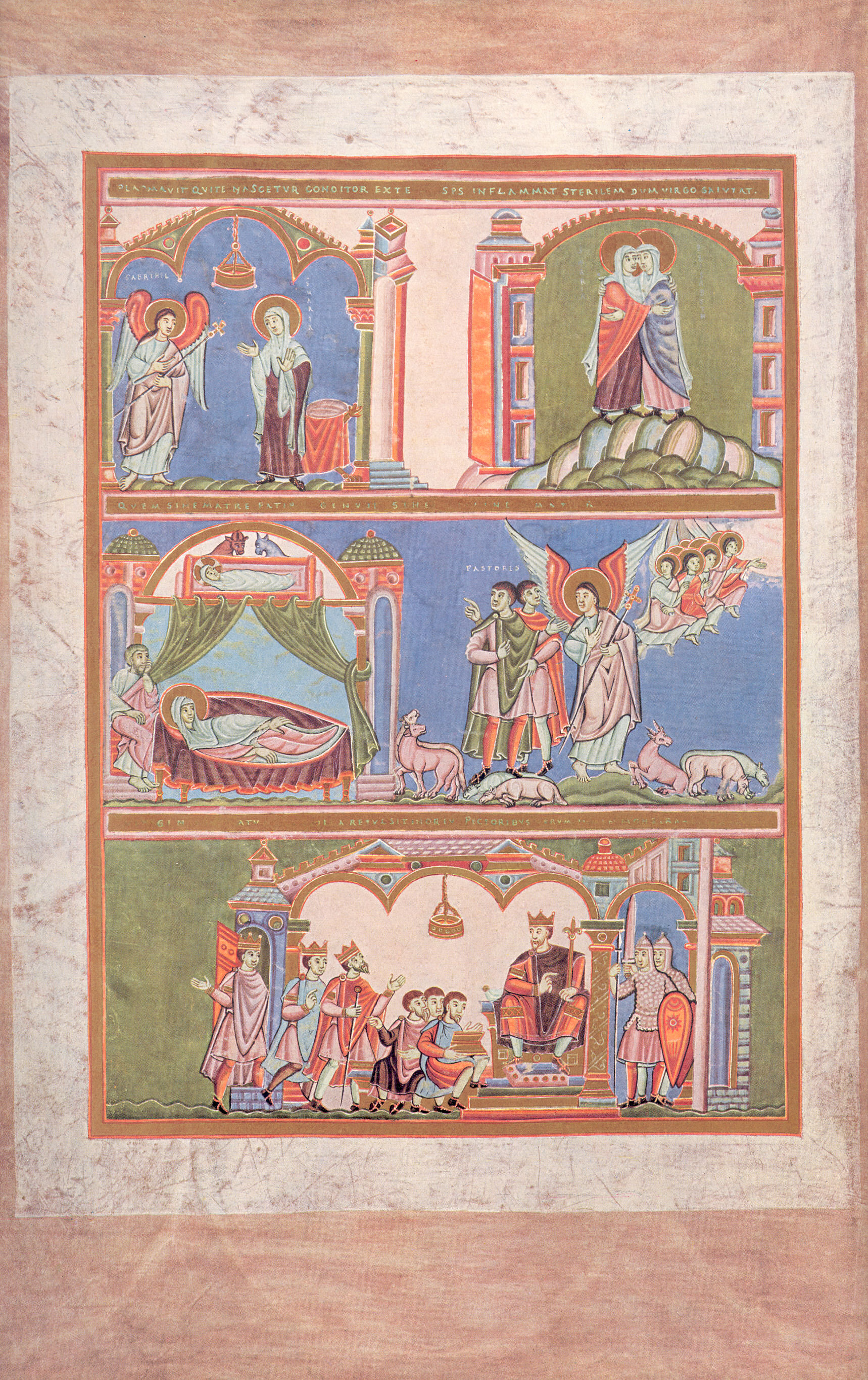
Codex Aureus of Echternach: Folio 18 verso

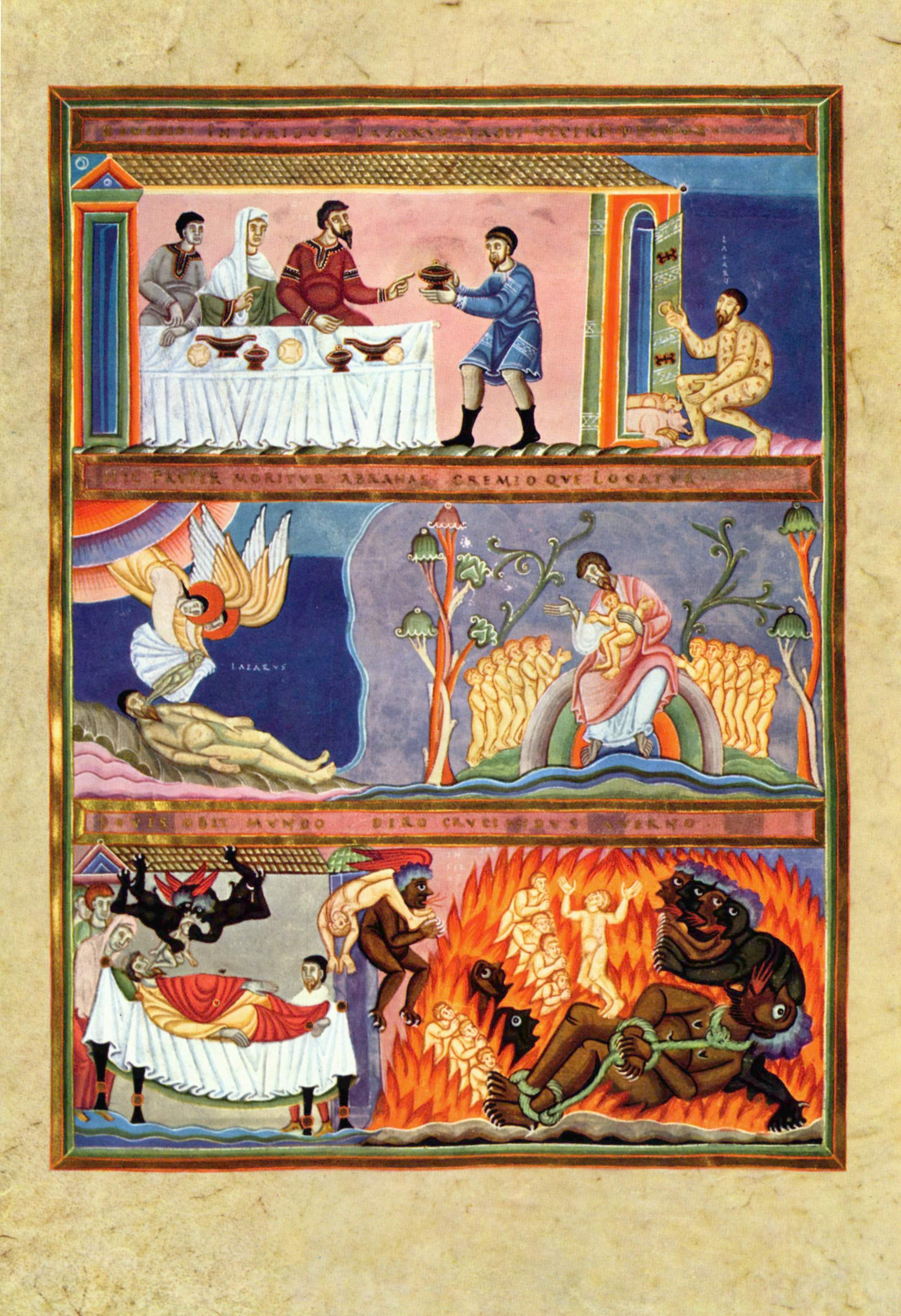
Codex Aureus of Echternach: Folio 78 recto

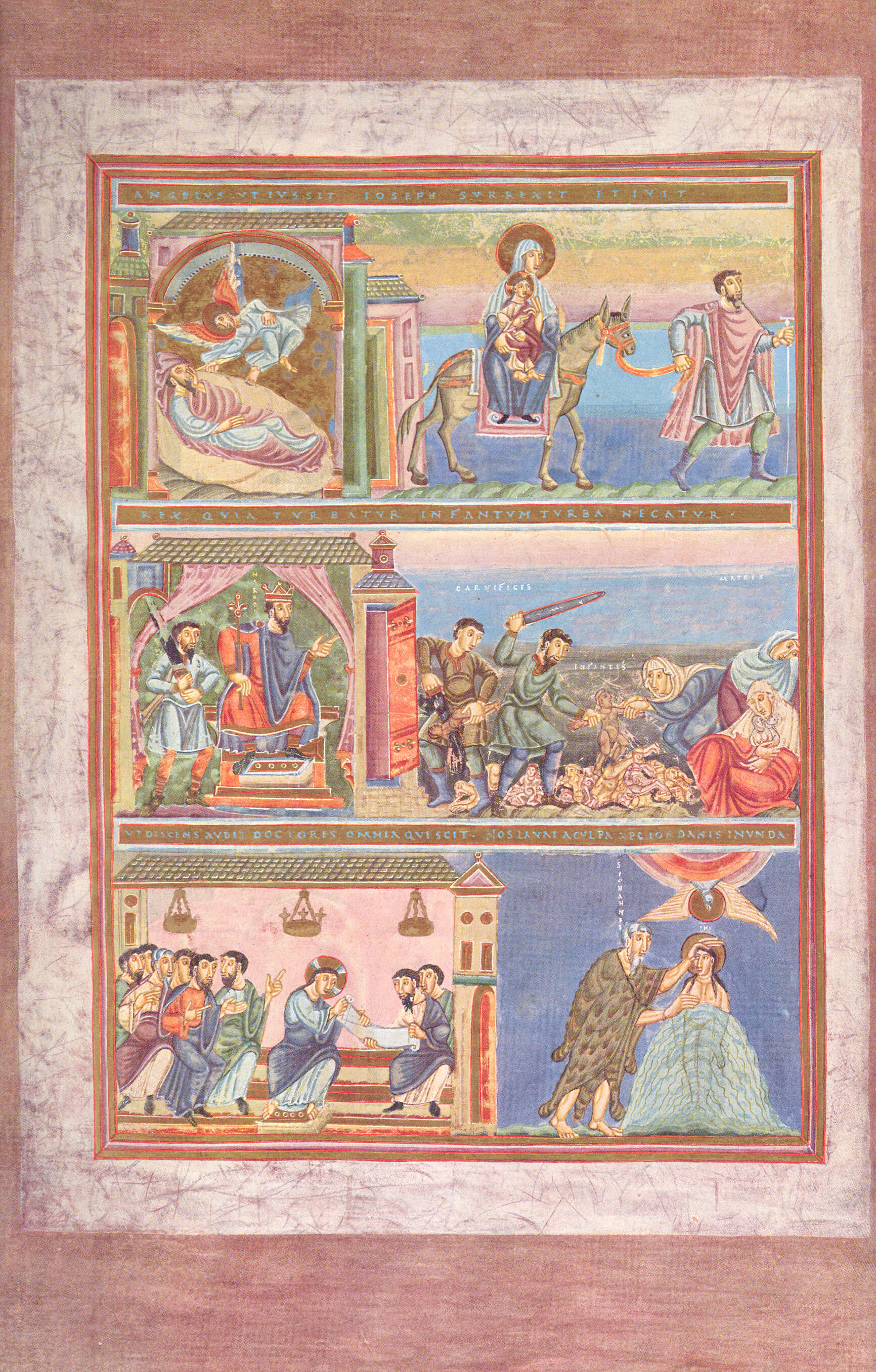
Codex Aureus of Echternach: Folio 19 verso

== Old views of Luxembourg ==
Mikal Nelson. One of the oldest works relating to the City of Luxembourg is a tinted pen-and-ink drawing of the Château Mansfeld or, more correctly, the Château de la Fontaine. The 16th-century work is attributed to the Flemish artist Tobias Verhaecht (1561–1631). Mansfeld was governor of Luxembourg from 1545 until his death in 1604. In 1598, Georg Braun and Franz Hogenberg published the oldest known view of Luxembourg City, a copper engraving that appeared in Civitates orbis terrarum (Cologne, 1598). Half a century later, the Dutch cartographer Joan Blaeu, drawing on Braun's work, published his "Luxemburgum" in the second volume of his Stedeboek (Amsterdam, 1649). Van der Meulen provides another view of Luxembourg from Limpertsberg where he depicts French troops taking the city in 1649.

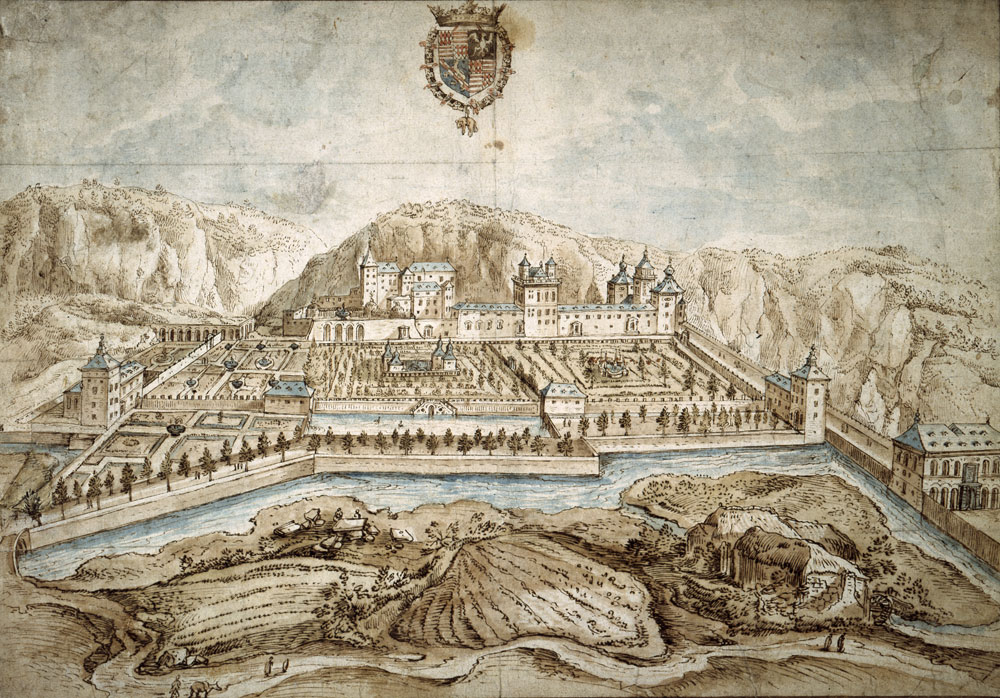
Tobias Verhaecht: La Fontaine (16th century)

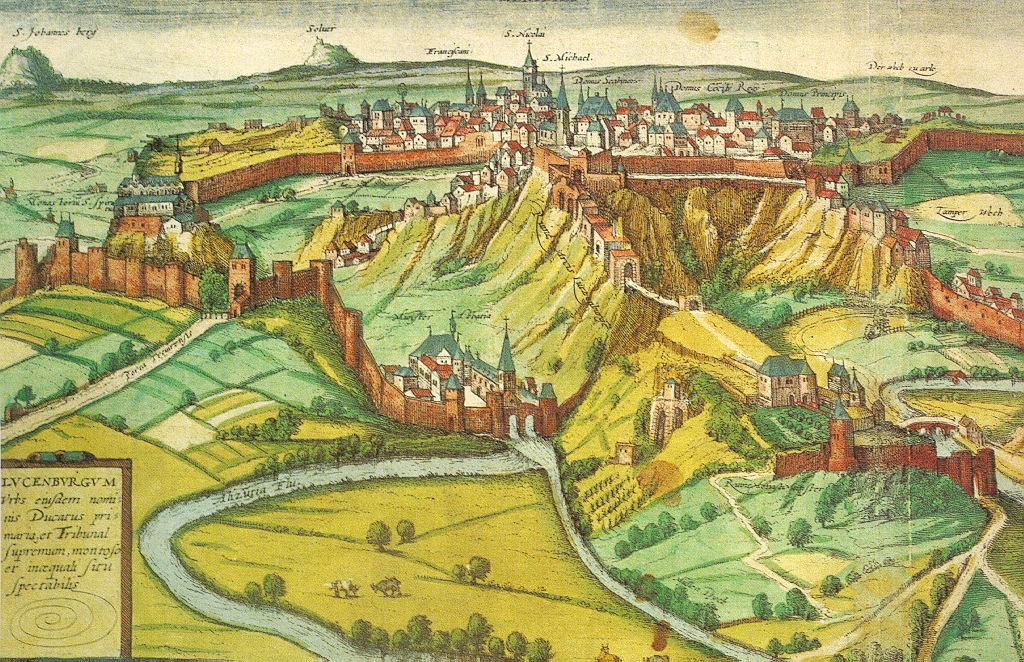
Georg Braun, Franz Hogenberg: Luxembourg City (1598)

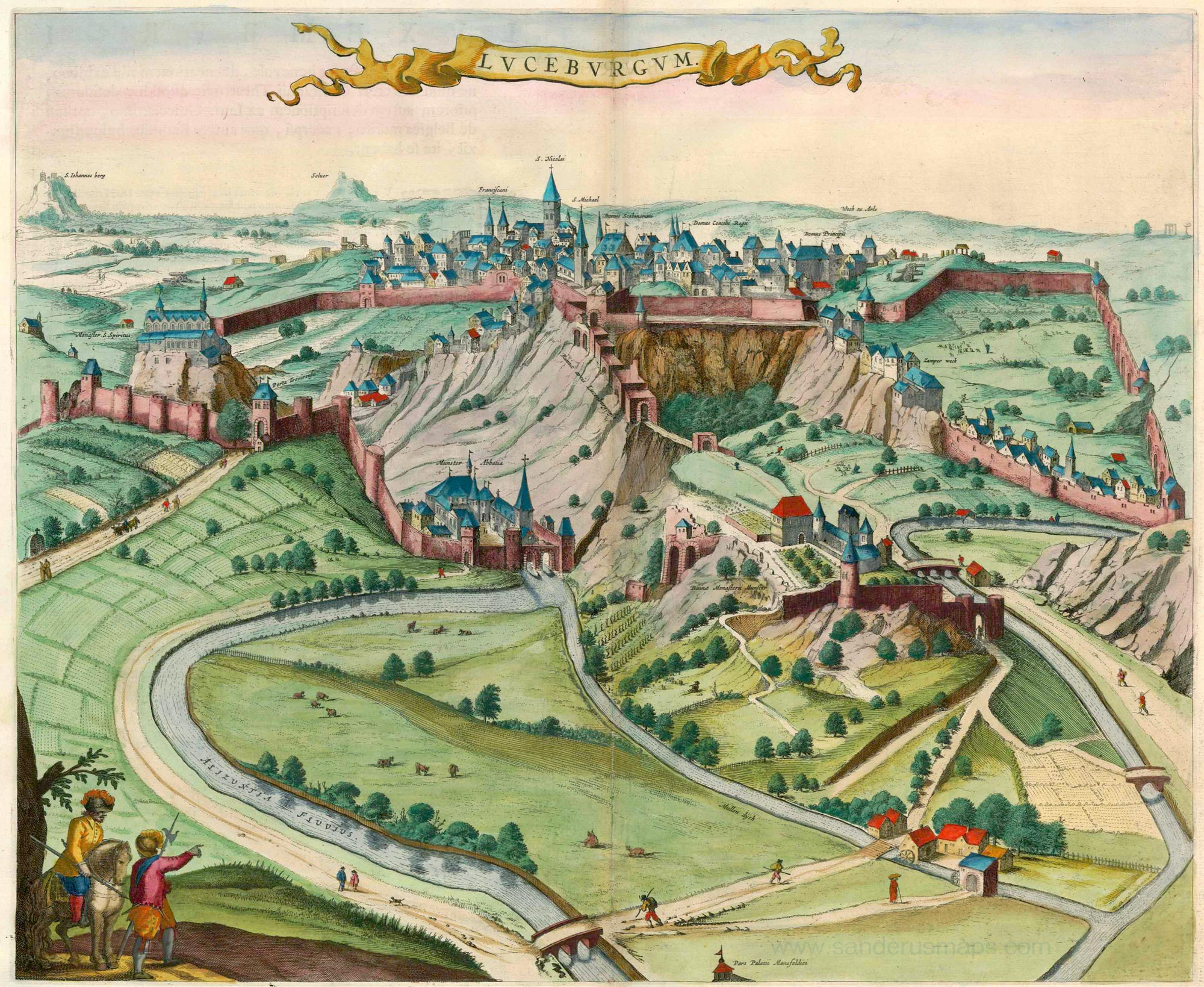
Joan Blaeu: Luxembourg City (1649)

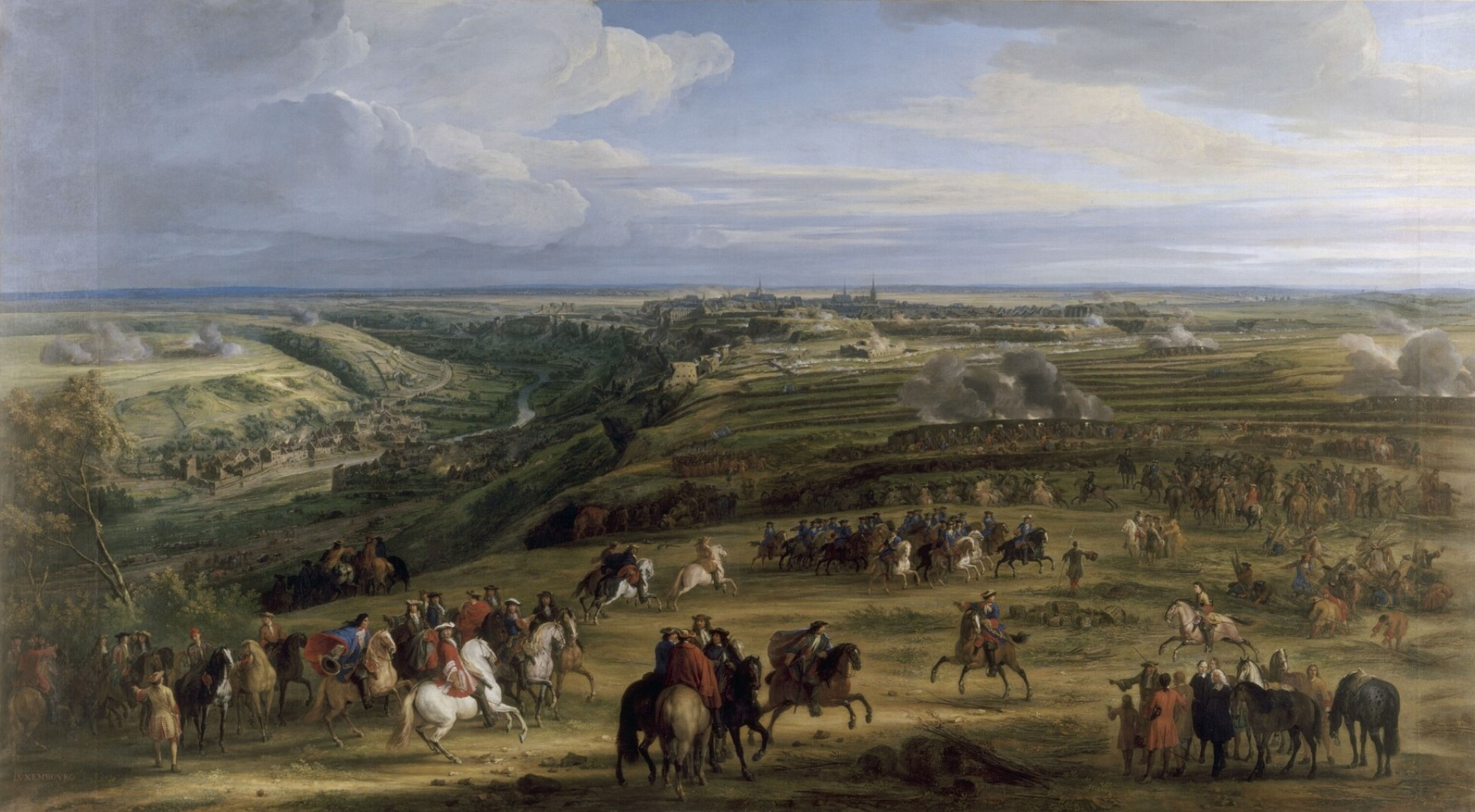
Van der Meulen: Prise de Luxembourg (1649)

== Early Luxembourgish artists ==
It was at the beginning of the 19th century that Luxembourgish artists finally began to acquire a spirit of nationalism resulting in works emphasizing the beauty of the city and the country as a whole. Jean-Baptiste Fresez (1800–1867) was the most important artist of the period, remembered above all for his almost photographic images of the City of Luxembourg. Fresez also produced portraits clearly depicting not just lively facial features but also the figure's clothing including, for example, the transparency of the lace. His landscapes, which he began to publish as early as 1826, were also of considerable artistic merit. In 1855, he published his famous Album pittoresque du Grand-Duché de Luxembourg containing extremely detailed compositions, many of them depicting Luxembourg's most beautiful views. His works are of great documentary value, especially those of the fortress of Luxembourg before it was dismantled.

Nicolas Liez (1809–1892), who had been one of Fresez' students, was a painter, sculptor and architect. He is remembered above all for his lithographs of scenes throughout the Grand Duchy and for his oil painting of the City of Luxembourg. His collection of lithographs published in "Voyage pittoresque à travers le Grand Duché de Luxembourg" (1934) contains some of his very best work. His most famous work is his view of the City of Luxembourg from the Fetschenhof, which he drew, painted and lithographed in 1870. It shows the city when the demolition of the fortress had just begun. Despite his attempt to emphasise the fortifications by exaggerating the height of the cliffs and the railway bridge, the painting is a good representation of the city and its skyscape.

Michel Engels (1851–1901) was an illustrator, painter and art teacher who is principally remembered for his sketches of the fortifications of Luxembourg City although he also painted a few watercolours.

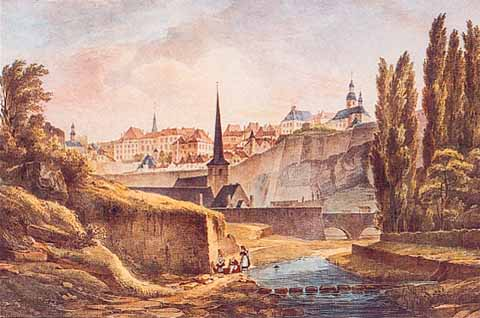
Jean-Baptiste Fresez: Luxembourg from the Alzette River (c. 1828)

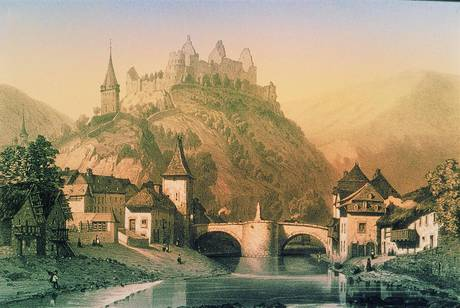
Jean-Baptiste Fresez: Vianden near the Bridge (c. 1857)

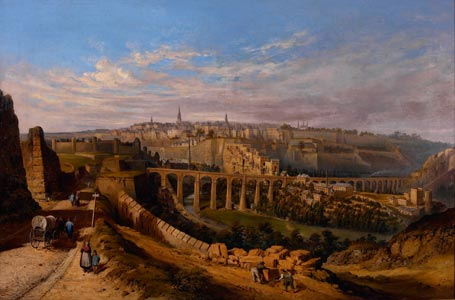
Nicolas Liez: View of Luxembourg from the Fetschenhof (1870)

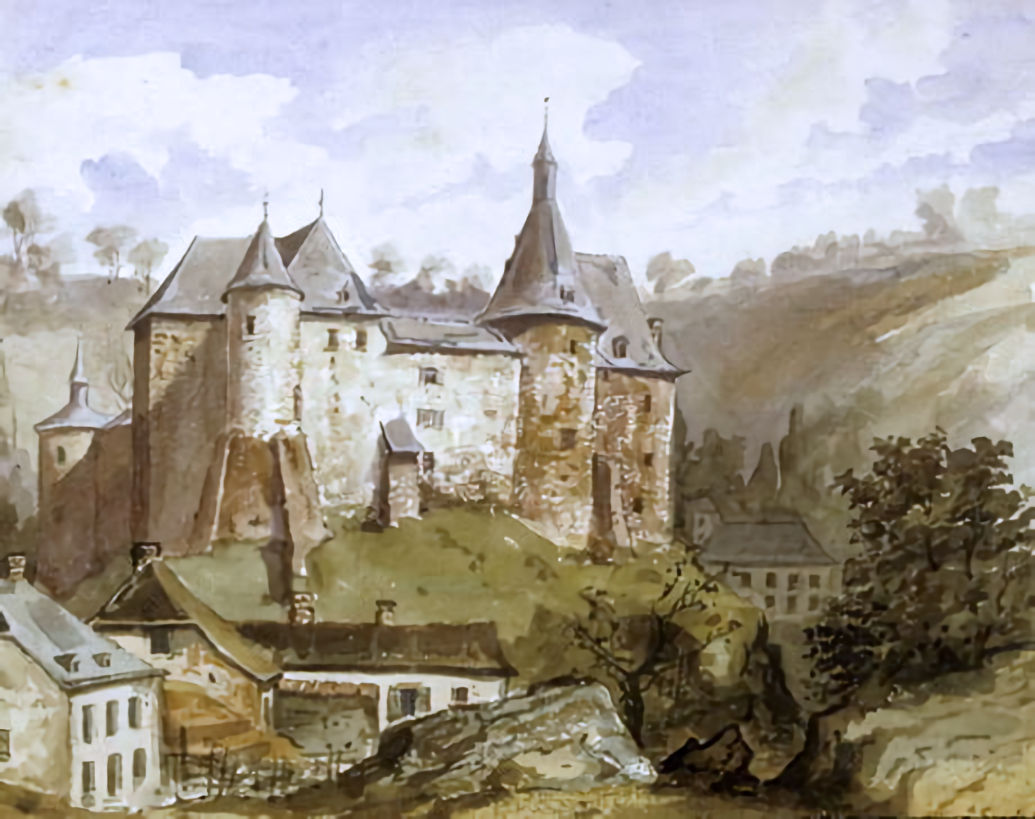
Michel Engels: Clervaux Castle (1886)

== Artistic visitors ==
In the 19th century, two well-known foreigners made important contributions to the art of Luxembourg. The first was the English Pre-impressionist painter J. M. W. Turner (1775–1851) who visited Luxembourg during extended study trips in 1825 and 1834 leaving many watercolours of the city and the surroundings. Victor Hugo (1802–1885), the French author, visited Luxembourg on several occasions. In 1871, he made a number of drawings of Luxembourg's castles, including Larochette, Schengen and especially Vianden.

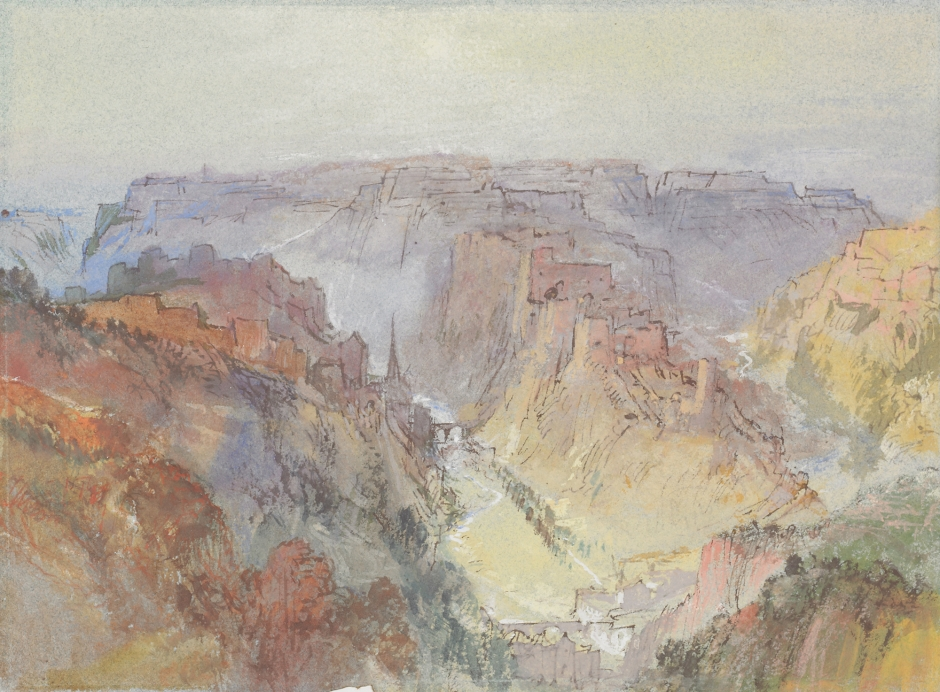
J. M. W. Turner: Luxembourg (1834)

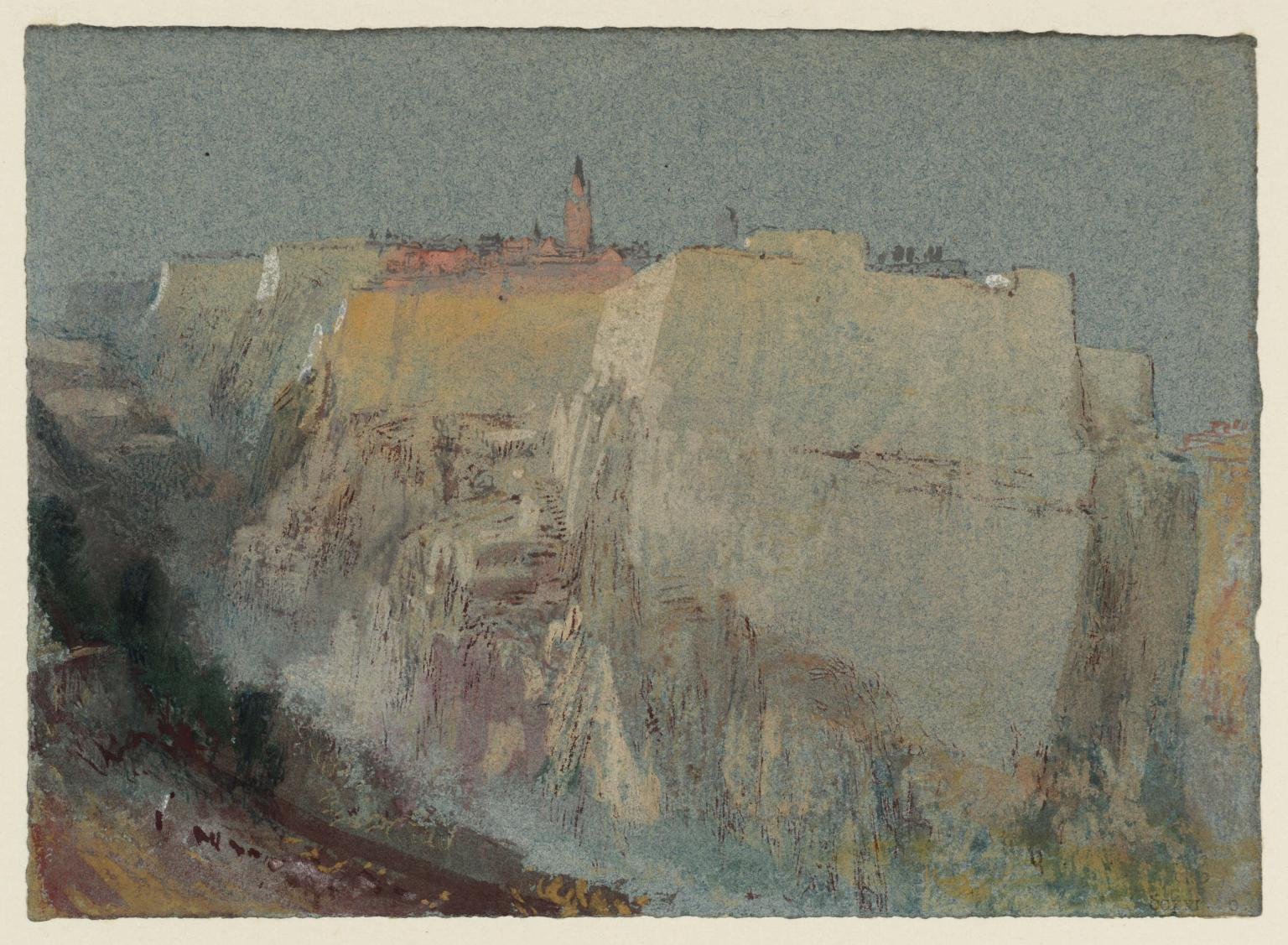
J. M. W. Turner: Citadel of St Esprit, Luxembourg (c. 1839)

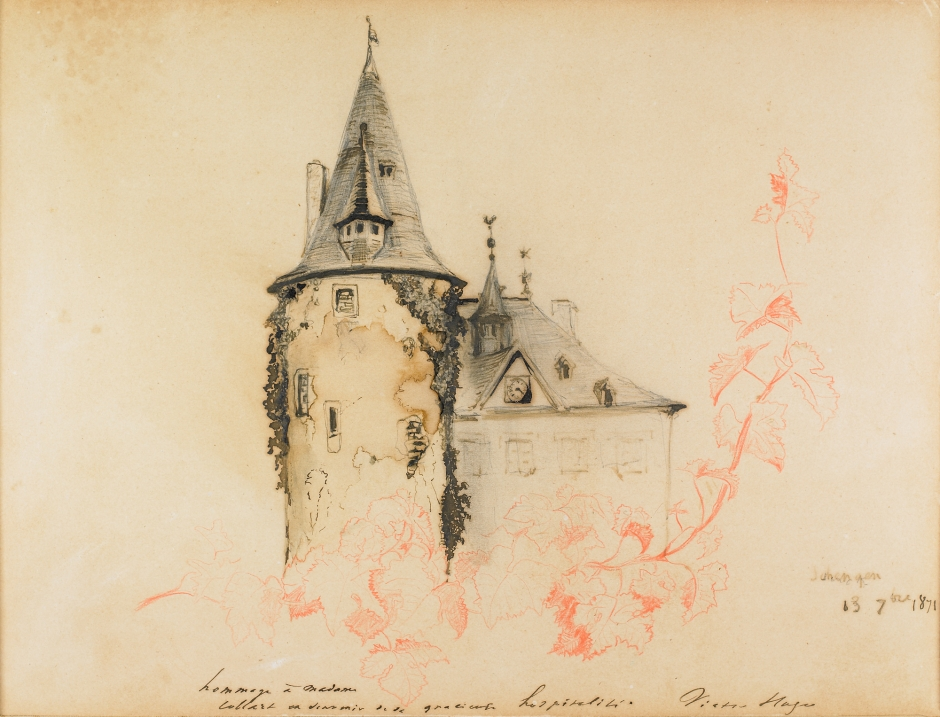
Victor Hugo: Schengen Castle (1871)

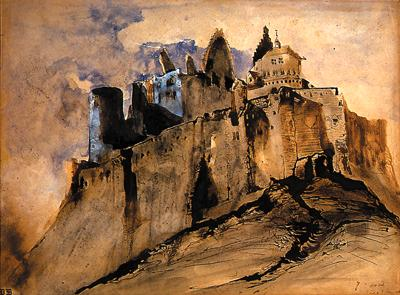
Victor Hugo: Ruins of Vianden Castle (1871)

== The 20th century ==
The first half of the 20th century was a rich period for Luxembourgish art. Joseph Kutter (1894–1941), considered Luxembourg's most successful painter, was influenced by the Impressionists but developed his own distinctive Expressionist style. In his paintings, the subjects often stand in the foreground as if photographed. His portraits, painted with strong brushstrokes, typically show figures with excessively large noses, sometimes looking like despairing clowns, but always attracting attention. From 1918, Kutter's landscapes and floral works began to present increasingly Expressionist motifs, with intense lines and strong colours. His painting of "Luxembourg", commissioned for the 1937 World Exposition in Paris is a good example of his Expressionist style with the houses stacked behind one another, the cubic form of the buildings and the exaggerated strength of the fortifications, so different from J. M. W. Turner's representation of almost the same scene. Although Kutter spent a number of years in Germany, his work was most influenced by trends in France and Belgium. He was one of the founders of the Luxembourg secessionist movement.

Another notable painter was the Impressionist Dominique Lang (1874–1919) whose paintings became increasingly uplifting, full of bright light and often depicting a young woman clothed in white. Using short brushstrokes, he would make abundant use of blues and greens. In 1912–13, he began to adopt the pure colouring favoured by Monet, Renoir and Pissarro. He would venture out along the banks of the River Alzette, painting scenes of orchards, flower picking and fruit harvesting or of peasants' houses in the area where he lived. His painting of Dudelange en 1917 is an excellent illustration of his characteristic aversion to industrialization. There is no sign of factories or workmen's housing in the idyllic countryside surrounding the town.

Claus Cito: Gëlle Fra (1923)

Nico Klopp (1894–1930) is remembered above all for his post-Impressionist paintings of scenes on the River Moselle. Klopp lived in Remich, where he painted many pictures of the bridge over the river. Both his landscapes and his still lifes are distinctive in their bright colouring and their solid strokes focusing firmly on the main subjects.

Frantz Seimetz (1858–1934) was a prolific artist who painted portraits and landscapes in the Impressionist style. His most fruitful period was in Echternach, where he painted numerous scenes of the surroundings including the Mullerthal. His pictures are generally realistic and slightly romantic, bordering on Impressionism. Especially after 1900, his style became brighter and more colourful, reflecting the happiness and beauty of the moments he experienced. Today Seimetz is remembered as a conscientious artist who dominated the Luxembourgish art scene for a considerable time. He was the first Luxembourger to delve into Impressionism and the first, after Nicolas Liez, to paint in the open air. He was also the first who managed to live from art alone.

Sosthène Weis (1872-1941) painted over 5,000 watercolours, mostly of Luxembourg and its surroundings. He also worked as an architect, designing some of Luxembourg's most imposing buildings including the central post office and the Arbed building. His earlier paintings, up to 1900, show the influence of his architectural interests, as buildings are depicted with accurate but rather boring precision. Thereafter, his own romantic post-Impressionist style begins to emerge, especially in his work from 1915 to 1945. His warm colours predominate with an abundance of violets, blues and ochres. Weis mastered the art of capturing the moment, poetically reproducing the misty light of the early morning, the heat of noon or the haze gathering in the valleys at sunset. Little by little reality gave way to less precise, more suggestive images as he concentrated ever more on the essentials. He would rapidly fill out the main lines of his scenes, interpreting them more and more freely until finally his pictures revealed a world of dreams and fantasy.

The sculptor Claus Cito (1882–1965) is remembered above all for the Gëlle Fra (Golden Woman) sculpture crowning the Monument of Remembrance obelisk (1923), raised in memory of the Luxembourg soldiers who died for their country in the First World War. His finest work is however considered to be the marble bust of Grand Duchess Charlotte which was completed in 1939 and now stands in the former town hall in Differdange.

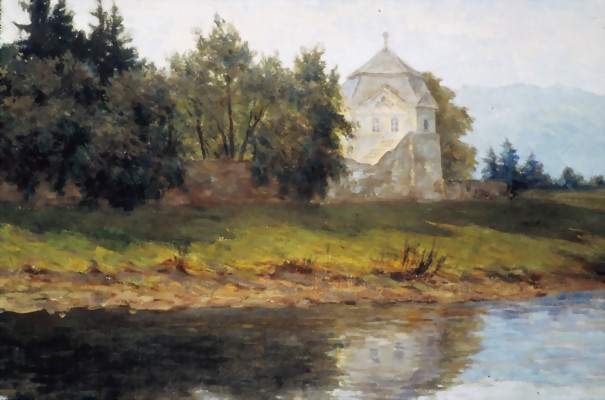
Frantz Seimetz: Pavilion at Echternach (c. 1904)

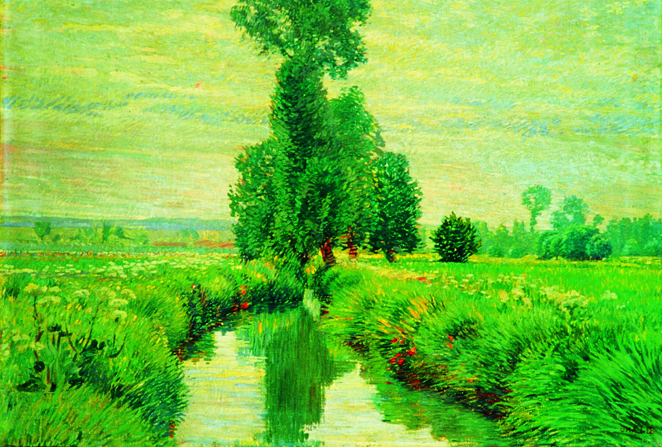
Dominique Lang: Banks of the Alzette (1915)

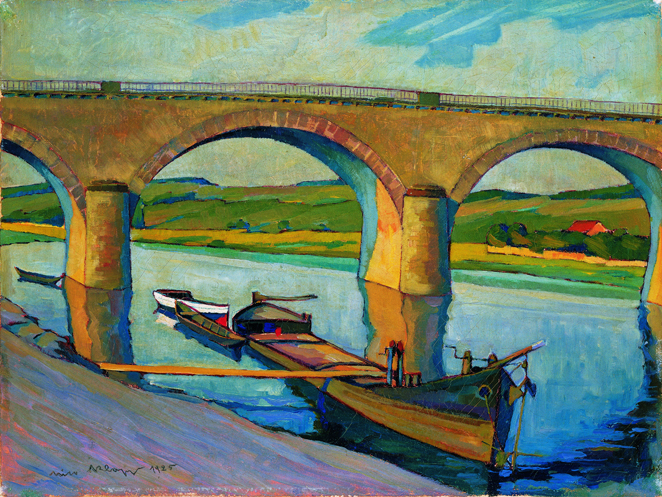
Nico Klopp: The Bridge at Remich (1925)

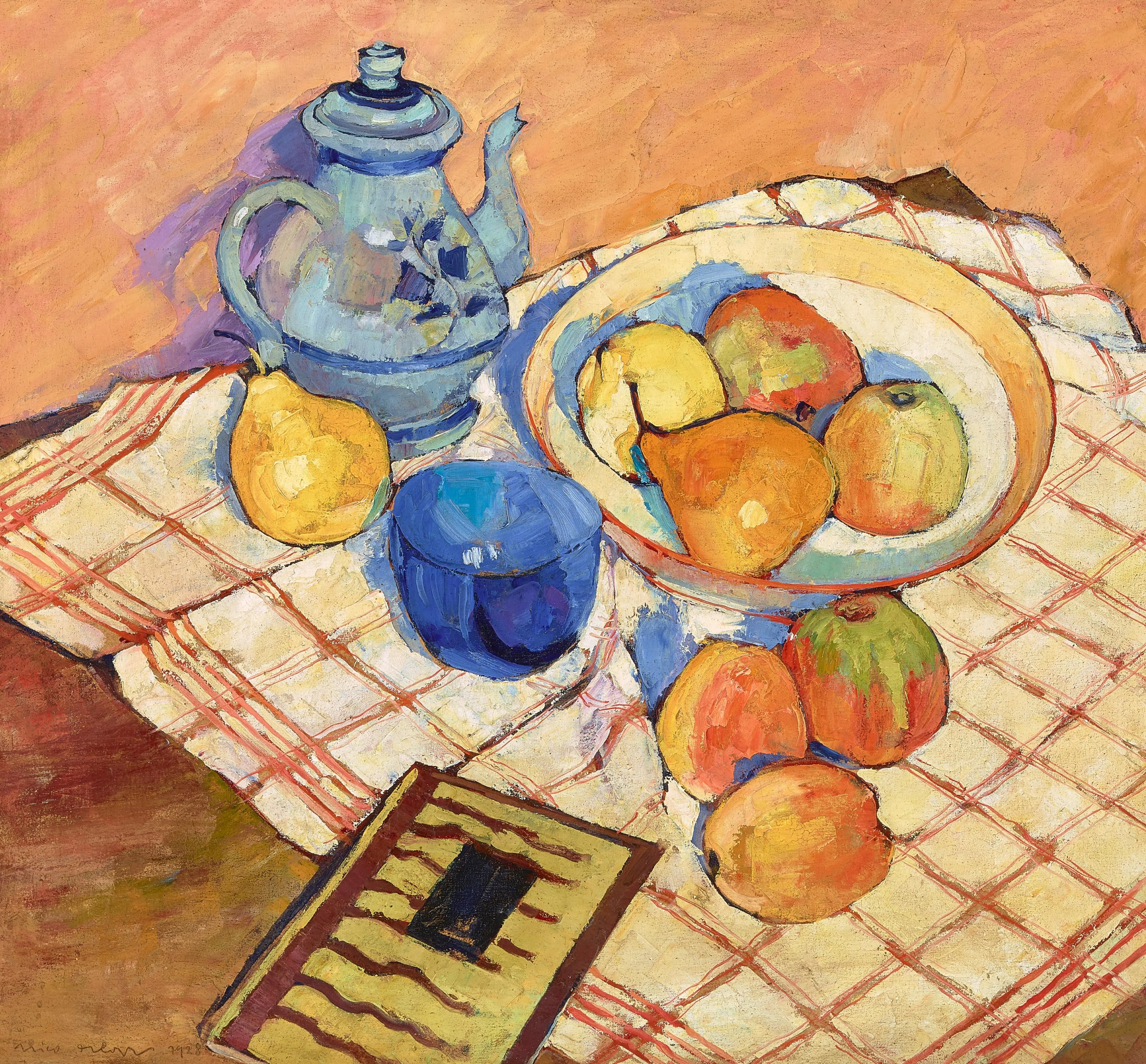
Nico Klopp: Still Life with Fruit (1930)

== Post-war contributors ==
Emile Kirscht (1913–1994) worked with acrylics and gouache on paper. In 1954, he was a co-founder of the Iconomaques group of abstract artists in Luxembourg. Although Kirscht turned to abstract painting in the 1950s with works such as Composition and Automnal, it was not until the early 1960s when he substituted acrylics for oils that he truly mastered the style. One of his most notable works, Village (1959), makes use of geometrical forms to represent the internal lines and structures of the topic.

Michel Stoffel (1903–1963), together with Joseph Kutter, is considered one of Luxembourg's most prominent painters. It was in 1950 that he first started to paint in the geometric style of abstract art, leading him in 1954 to be one of the founding members and spokesman of the Iconomaques, a group of Luxembourgish artists devoted to abstract art. In 1956, he received an honorable mention at the fourth São Paulo Art Biennial. He completed two mosaics for Luxembourg's Nouvel Athénée in 1962 and became a member of the arts and literature section of Grand Ducal Institute.

Foni Tissen (1909–1975) is remembered principally for his hyperrealistic, darkly humorous paintings, many of which were self-portraits. Tissen aimed to spread art to all parts of society in order to "elevate the spirit of man" as he put it. While his postage stamps, posters and the logo for the emergency services have become part of Luxembourg's collective memory, his close attachment to his native Rumelange and the area's Red Rocks can be seen in his landscapes and engravings. The most typical part of his work is however the surrealist series of paintings he referred to as his Maennerscher or little men, many of them self-portraits constituting a one-man comedy. The symbols he uses guide the spectator to the extensive workings of his imagination. All in all, his work reveals his search for what he called "the truth which is beauty and sincerity".

Gust Graas (1924-2020) was a Luxembourgish businessman and painter who has not only played a major role in the development of Luxembourg-based radio and television concern RTL but is also a talented abstract painter. Graas has always taken an active interest in art, producing paintings and works of sculpture. When studying in Paris, he met several Impressionist painters from the Paris School with whom he maintained contact. In 1970, he was awarded the Prix Grand-Duc Adolphe. Since his retirement in 1989, he has lived in Pollença on Majorca, where he continued to paint. His exhibition Mis años en España (1989-2003) clearly shows how the sun and colour of the island had influenced his work.

Closely associated with the post-war artists was the sculptor Lucien Wercollier whose impressive abstract works in bronze and marble can be found not just in public places in Luxembourg but in the surrounding countries too.

One of the country's most successful contemporary artists is Su-Mei Tse who, in 2003, won the Golden Lion, a prize awarded to the best national participant at the Venice International Exhibition of Contemporary Art. Les balayeurs du désert (The Desert Sweepers), her video projection there, shows street sweepers in their distinctive Paris uniforms pointlessly sweeping away at the desert sand to the soft sound of brooms against asphalt. The second major work, "The Echo", also a video, depicts an Alpine scene in which a tiny figure plays the cello, the simple sounds of the instrument being reflected by the mountains.

== Art societies ==
Luxembourg's principal society for art is the Cercle artistique de Luxembourg, which was founded in 1893 and still thrives today. It brings together artists of all types with a view to supporting artistic work and art education. In 1926, a number of avant-gardists including Joseph Kutter and Nico Klopp founded the Luxembourg secessionist movement which presented their Expressionist works at the annual exhibitions of the Salon de la Sécession until their aspirations were reconciled with the Cercle in 1930. In 1954, a group of Abstract artists including Emile Kirscht, Michel Stoffel and Lucien Wercollier founded Iconomaques which brought modern art to Luxembourg through the important exhibitions they arranged in 1954 and 1959.

== See also ==
- Architecture of Luxembourg
- Photography in Luxembourg
