= Joseph Probst =

Joseph Probst (1911–1997) was a Luxembourgish painter who, in 1954, was one of the founder members of the Iconomaques group of abstract painters who opposed figurative art.

== Early life and education ==
Probst was born on 18 November 1911 in Vianden in the north of Luxembourg. After a classical education in Luxembourg from 1924 to 1931, he spent a year studying art at the Ecole des Artisans in Luxembourg City. He then went to Brussels where he attended the Académie Royale des Beaux-Arts before completing his studies at the École nationale supérieure des arts décoratifs in 1940.

== Career ==
After the Second World War, Probst began to work as an artist under the influence of Expressionism. Initially he concentrated on portraits of nudes and, especially mother-and-child paintings, but moved ever closer to abstract art under the influence of Michel Stoffel and Lucien Wercollier with whom he became one of the founding members of the Nouvelle Equipe.

In 1954, together with his wife Colette Würth and Will Dahlem, Henri Dillenburg, François Gillen, François Kinnen, Emile Kirscht, Wenzel Profant, Michel Stoffel und Lucien Wercollier, he became a co-founder of the Iconomaques, a group bent on abstract art. Thereafter, Probst was recognized as one of Luxembourg's classic artists, not just through local interest in his works but through exhibits at the Musée National d'Art Moderne in Paris and at the Universal Postal Union in Bern. In 1960, he was awarded the Italian Marzotto Prize, indicating the extent of foreign interest in his work.

== Style ==
His abstract style developed slowly from the early effects of his dark, subdued colours on form until his oils and guaches became ever more geometrical. From 1955, he moved even further into complex, interwoven forms with an extended spectrum of colour, making him a true proponent of lyrical abstract art. From 1972, he developed a new clarity of form which he also applied to stained-glass windows, murals and mosaics. The spiral took on special importance in his work, revealing his growing depth of interest in abstraction. Representing variations on a theme, his mosaics depict visual versions of musical compositions such as Franz Schubert's Winterreise cycle. In later life, Probst returned to figurative painting which can be seen in his 1994 and 1995 exhibits.

== Bibliography ==
- Nic Weber, "Joseph Probst: 1911 Vianden, + 1997 Junglinster", Les Cahiers Luxembourgeois, 1997, No 3, pp. 1–17.
- "Joseph Probst, peintures 1992–1995", exposition nr.230, Galerie Kutter, Luxembourg: Editions Edouard Kutter, 1995.
- "Joseph Probst, La Figure Humaine, pastels à l'huile", exposition nr.217, Galerie Kutter, Luxembourg: Editions Edouard Kutter, 1994.
- "Joseph Probst, dessins 1953–1990", exposition nr.190, Galerie Kutter, Luxembourg: Editions Edouard Kutter, 1990.
- "Joseph Probst, pastels à l'huile 1986–1998", exposition nr.177, Galerie Kutter, Luxembourg: Editions Edouard Kutter, 1989.
- Joseph Probst, "Exh. Österreich-Haus, Vienna, 10 Januar − 5 Februar 1984", Luxembourg, Impr. Saint-Paul, 1984.
- "Joseph Probst", texte par Joseph-Emile Muller, Luxembourg: Editions Edouard Kutter, 1979.
