= Rumelange =

Rumelange Rëmeleng (Luxembourgish) Rümelingen (German)
- Commune
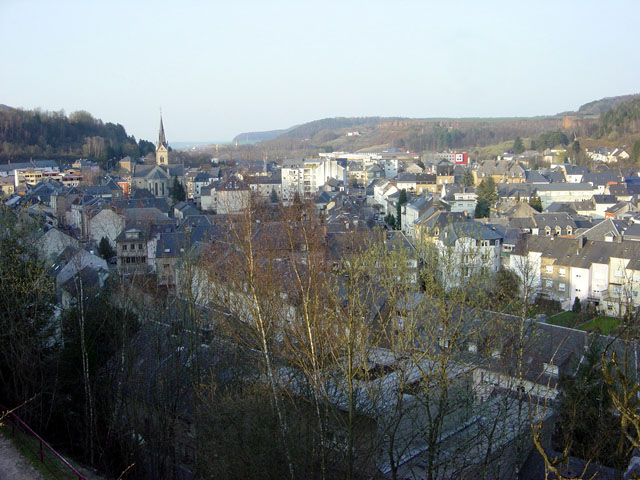

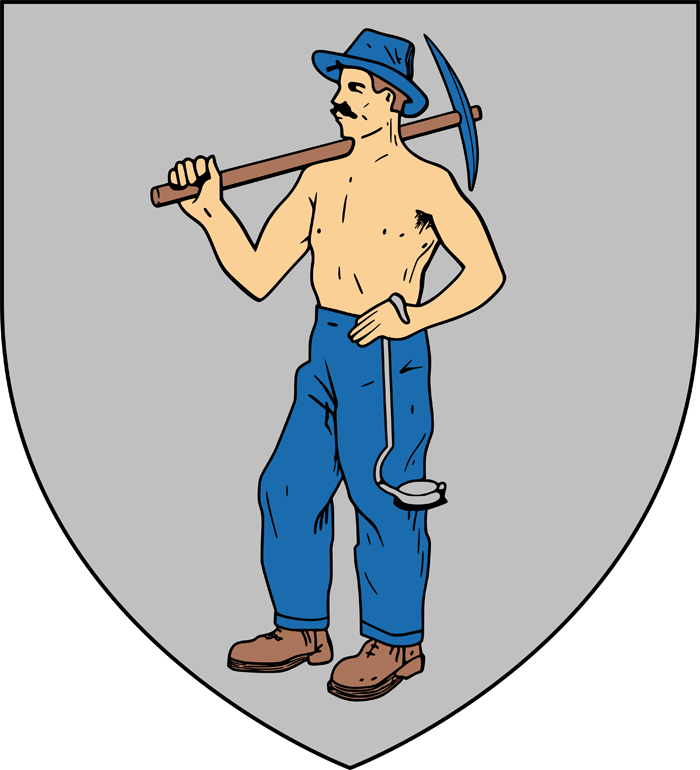
- Coat of arms

- Map of Luxembourg with Rumelange highlighted in orange, and the canton in dark red
- Coordinates: 49.4597°N 6.0306°E
- Country: Luxembourg
- Canton: Esch-sur-Alzette

Government
  - Mayor: Henri Haine (LSAP)

Area
  - Total: 6.83 km^{2} (2.64 sq mi)
  - Rank: 101st of 100
- Highest elevation: 432 m (1,417 ft)
  - Rank: 27th of 100
- Lowest elevation: 287 m (942 ft)
  - Rank: 88th of 100

Population (2025)
  - Total: 5,735
  - Rank: 28th of 100
  - Density: 840/km^{2} (2,170/sq mi)
  - Rank: 9th of 100
- Time zone: UTC+1 (CET)
  - Summer (DST): UTC+2 (CEST)
- LAU 2: LU0000212
- Website: rumelange.lu

Rumelange (French pronunciation: [ʁymlɑ̃ʒ]; Luxembourgish: Rëmeleng [ˈʀəməleŋ]; German: Rümelingen [ˈʁyːməlɪŋən]) is a commune with city status in southern Luxembourg, on the border with France.

== Populated places ==
The commune consists of the following villages:

- Rumelange
- Haut-Tétange (lieu-dit)

== Population ==
Historical population

Year	Pop.	±%
1821	401	—
1851	578	+44.1%
1900	4,601	+696.0%
1910	5,296	+15.1%
1922	4,534	−14.4%
1935	4,198	−7.4%

Year	Pop.	±%
1947	4,072	−3.0%
1960	4,271	+4.9%
1970	3,935	−7.9%
1981	3,711	−5.7%
1990	3,460	−6.8%
2000	4,080	+17.9%

Year	Pop.	±%
2005	4,500	+10.3%
2010	5,029	+11.8%
2015	5,338	+6.1%
2020	5,604	+5.0%
2021	5,613	+0.2%

Source data

== History ==
Rumelange was formed on 25 September 1891, when it was detached from the commune of Kayl. The law forming Rumelange was passed on 27 June 1891.

== Population ==
As of 1 January 2023, the commune had a population of 5,692.

== Museum ==
It is the site of some of the underground iron mines no longer in operation. Rumelange is home to Luxembourg's National Mining Museum.

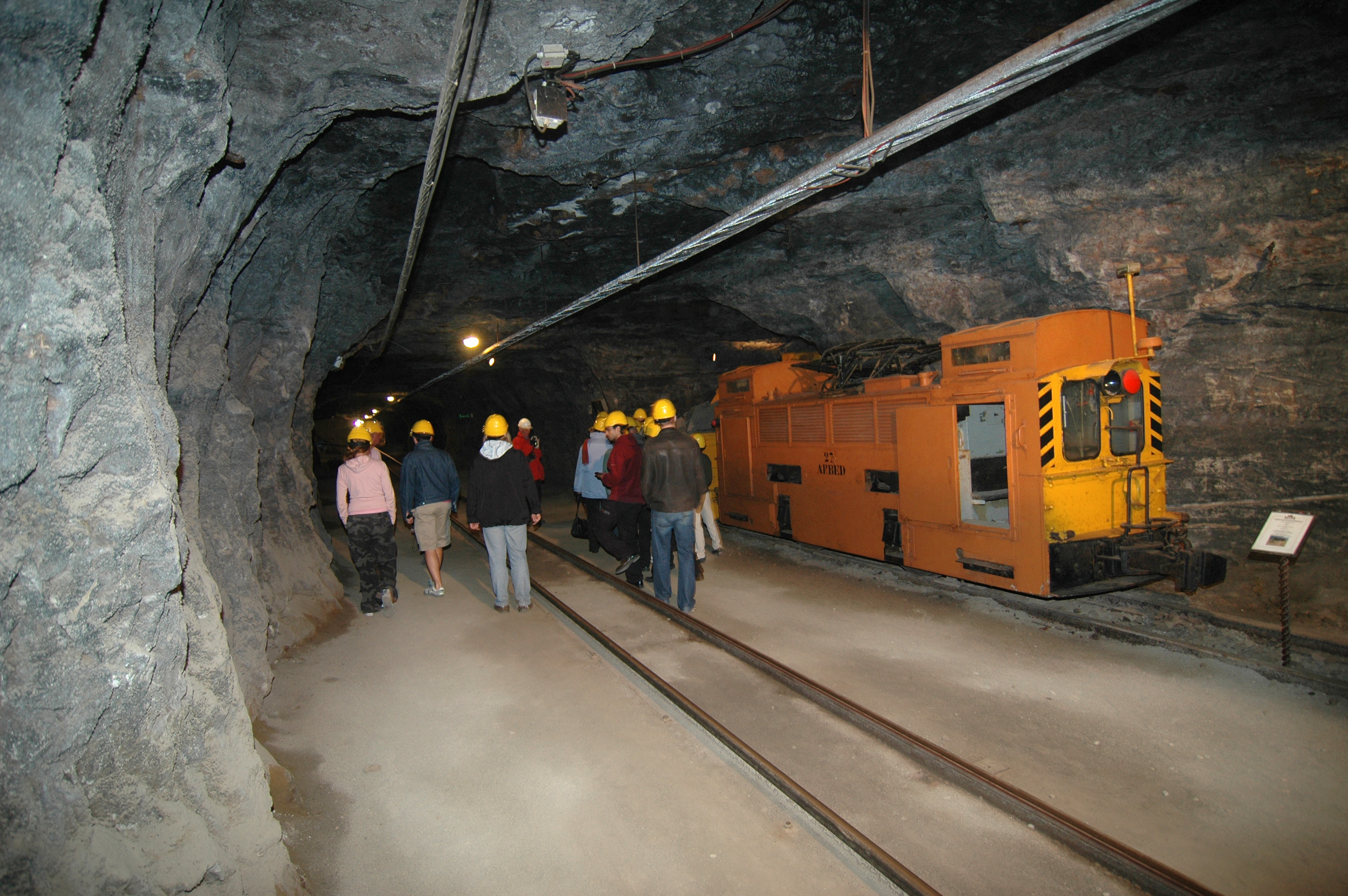
Inside the National Mining Museum

== Notable people ==
- Batty Weber (1860–1940) an influential journalist and author
- Alfred Kieffer (1904–1987) a Luxembourgish footballer, competed in the 1924 Summer Olympics
- Foni Tissen (1909–1975) a Luxembourg schoolteacher and artist of hyperrealistic, darkly humorous paintings
- Ernest Toussaint (1908–1942) boxer, competed in the 1936 Summer Olympics; resistance member
- Emile Kirscht (1913–1994) a Luxembourg painter and a co-founder of the Iconomaques group of abstract artists in Luxembourg
- Raymond Vouel (1923–1987), a Luxembourg politician and Deputy Prime Minister, 1974/1976

== Twin towns ==
Rumelange is twinned with:

- Petnjica, Montenegro
