= National Resistance Museum, Luxembourg =

World War II museum in Luxembourg

Coordinates: 49.4924°N 5.9760°E

National Museum of Resistance and Human Rights
- Musée National de la Résistance et des Droits Humains
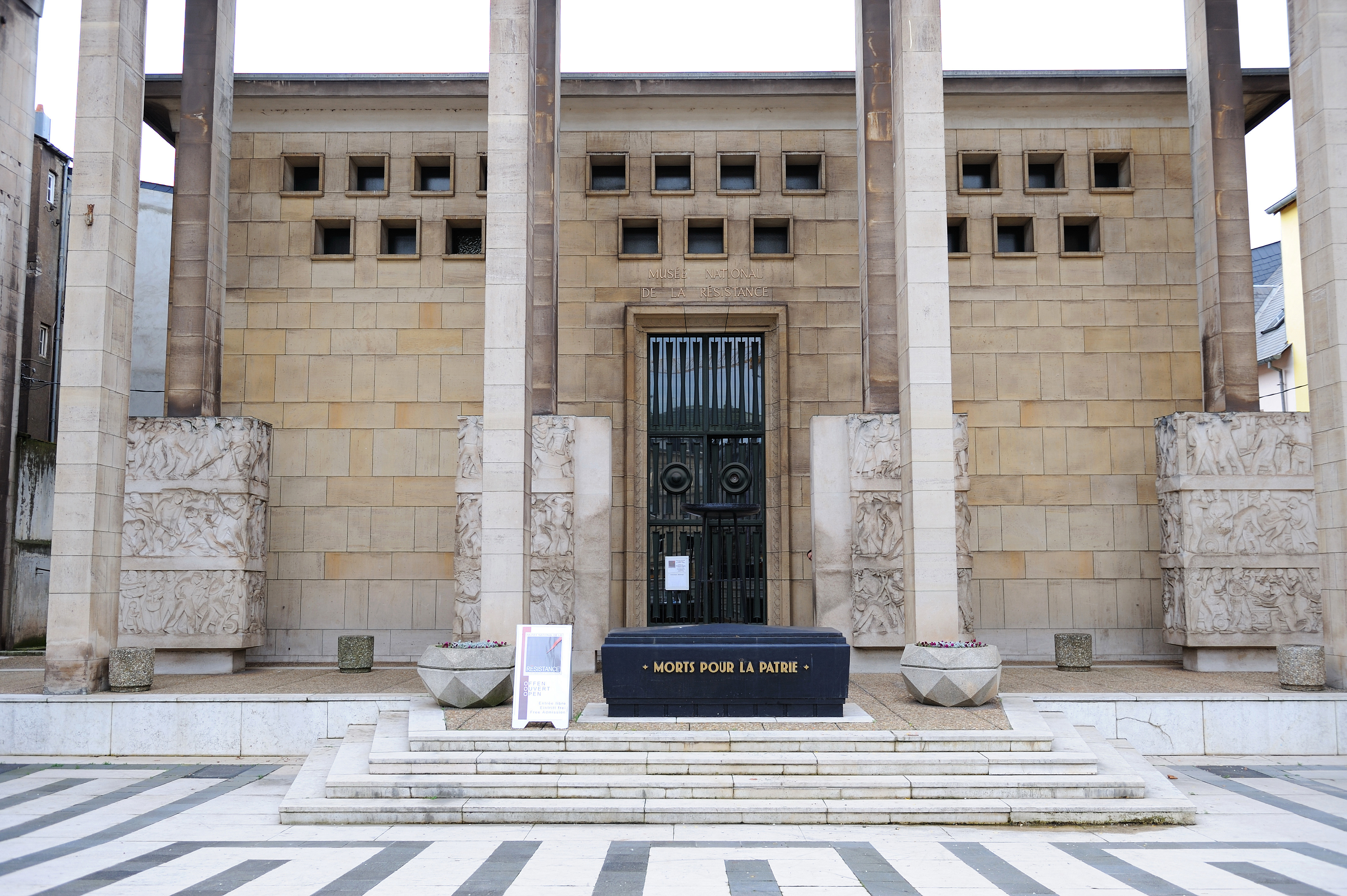
- Established: July 22, 1956; 69 years ago
- Location: Esch-sur-Alzette, Luxembourg
- Type: World War II Museum
- Website: mnr.lu

The National Museum of Resistance and Human Rights (Luxembourgish: Nationale Resistenzmusée; French: Musée National de la Résistance et des Droits Humains; German: Nationales Museum des Widerstands und der Menschenrechte) is located in the centre of Esch-sur-Alzette in the south-west of Luxembourg. The specially designed building (1956) traces the history of Luxembourg from 1940 to 1945 under the Nazi oppression, through the reactions of the people (passive resistance, resistance movements, forced enrolment, strike, refractory, Luxembourger in the maquis and in the Allied forces), until liberation, by photos, objects and works of art. There is also an exhibition of the Nazi concentration camps and the treatment of Luxembourg's Jews.

== History ==
From the late 1940s, those involved in the resistance and political deportees began to plan a national resistance museum in order to preserve the memory of Luxembourg's victims of the Nazi occupation. A committee made up of the City of Esch-sur-Alzette, unions and representatives of resistance movements under the presidency of Ed Barbel, undertook a fund-raising exercise which led to the opening of the Resistance Museum on 22 July 1956. The building was designed by the architects Nicolas Schmit-Noesen and Laurent Schmit.

In 1984, the Minister of Culture, Robert Krieps, had the collection renewed and the museum renovated. The museum re-opened in 1987, and through ministerial authority was now dubbed a "National" museum. Since 2008 Frank Schroeder, a former art teacher, manages the museum.

== The collection ==
The exhibition on the ground floor describes the fate of the Luxembourg people from the German invasion on 10 May 1940, the beginning of the Nazi regime, until the liberation in September 1944 with the arrival of the Americans or in January 1945 after the Battle of the Bulge. The first floor is devoted to artefacts from the concentration camps and the treatment of Luxembourg's Jews.

Works of art include the reliefs by Emile Hulten and Claus Cito outside the museum to sculptures by Lucien Wercollier and René Weyland inside. The large fresco by Foni Tissen and his canvas of the Hinzert concentration camp as well as Yvonne Useldinger's drawings of the Ravensbrück camp are also of note.

== Exhibitions ==
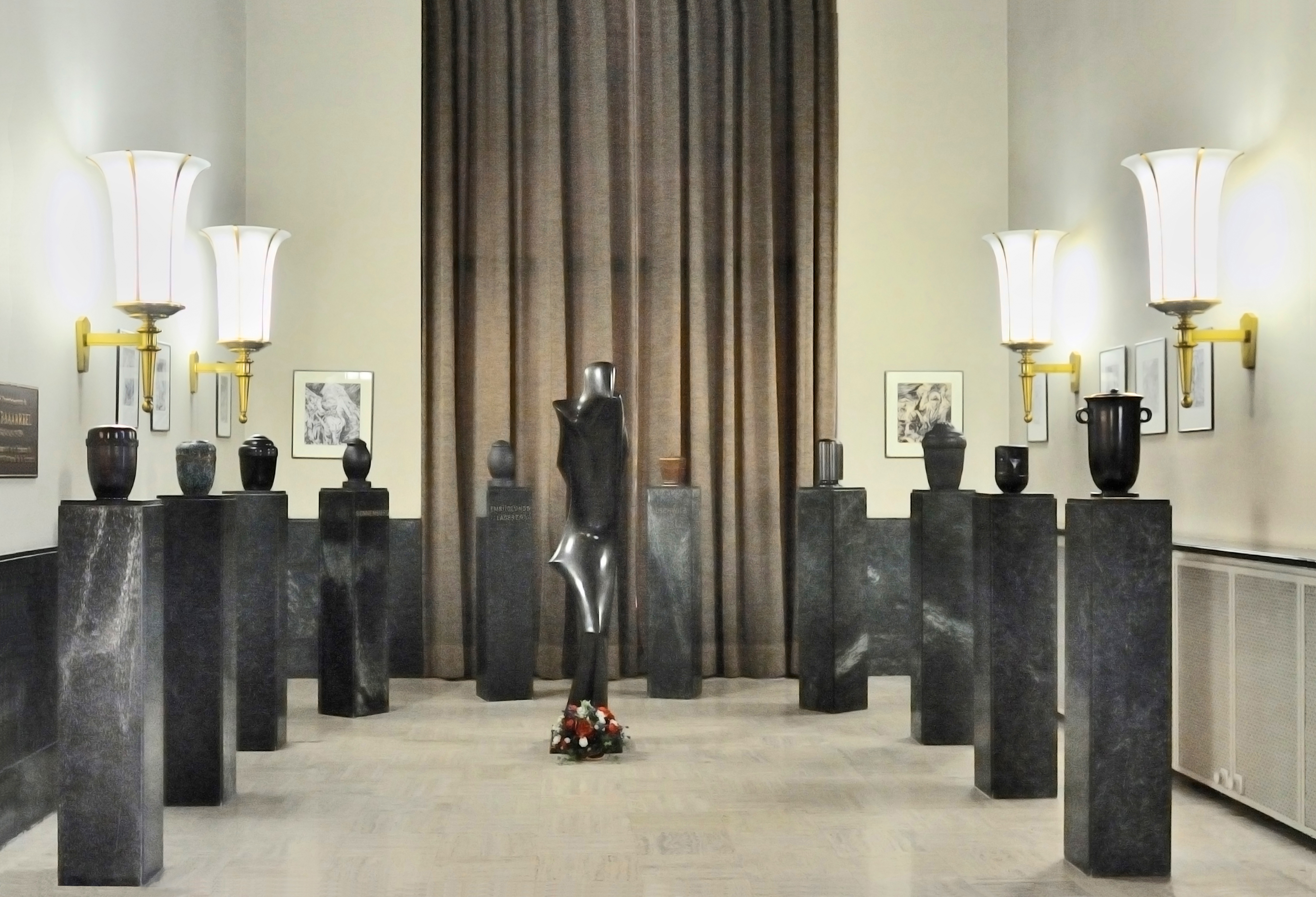
Wercollier's Le prisonnier politique

Since September 2009, temporary exhibitions have been displayed in the museum. Approximately every six months a new exhibition is shown:

- Lebensbilder, with oil paintings by Madeleine Weis-Bauler, a former resistance member and political deportee, from 4 September 2009 to 3 October 2009.
- Spott dem Naziregime - Karikaturen in Luxemburg vor, während und nach dem Krieg, the first exhibition produced by the museum itself, from 4 June 2010 to 5 September 2010.
- Témoins / Zeugen, with photos by the Luxembourgish artist Tom Hermes, who portrayed contemporary witnesses, from 28 January 2011 to 1 May 2011.
- Kunst/KZ - Art/camps with works by the artists Yvonne Useldinger, Lily Unden, Lucien Wercollier, Edmond Goergen and Foni Tissen, from 6 May 2011 to 16 October 2011.
- Peuple européen, peuple étranger - Le Luxembourg et les Roms, with photos by Patrick Galbats, from 10 February 2012 to 6 June 2012.
- Between Shade and Darkness - Le sort des Juifs du Luxembourg de 1940 à 1945, from 29 May to 24 November 2013.
- Nelson Mandela - From Prisoner to President, from 29 April to 28 September 2014.
- Gestapo-Terror in Luxemburg, from 17 October 2015 to 8 May 2016.
- Je me souviens, from 15 October 2016 to 25 June 2017.
- Memento, a presentation of Albert Kaiser's complete works from the homonymous series of 80 linocuts, from 13 January 2018 to 15 April 2018.

== See also ==
- List of museums in Luxembourg

== Bibliography ==
- Bernard Thomas, Bruchstellen - Chronik des Escher Resistenzmuseums; in: forum, Nr. 299 (September 2010), pp. 12–18.
- Musée national de la Résistance, "Luxemburg im 2. Weltkrieg" ISBN 2-9599670-1-1
