= Cercle artistique de Luxembourg =

The Cercle artistique de Luxembourg (CAL), originally the Cercle artistique luxembourgeois, is an association founded in 1893 which brings together artists of all types with a view to supporting artistic work and art education in the Grand Duchy of Luxembourg.

Its founding members were Michel Engels, Pierre Blanc, and Franz Heidenstein, who was also the association's first president, serving from 1893 to 1899.

The organisation's Salon du CAL exhibition has been held annually since 1896. Among Luxembourg's prominent artists who have exhibited at the salon are Dominique Lang, Emile Kirscht, Michel Stoffel, and Claus Cito.

== Presidents ==
- Franz Heldenstein (1893–1899)
- Michel Engels (1899–1901)
- Antoine Hirsch (1901–1904)
- André Thyes (1904–)
- Pierre Blanc
- Ferdinand d'Huart (1910–1919)
- Pierre Blanc (1920–1927)
- Alphonse Nickels (1928–1936)
- Paul Wigreux (1937–1939)
- Michel Stoffel (1939–1949)
- Alphonse Weicker (1950–1958)
- Victor Engels (1959–1961)
- Jemp Michels (1962–1968)
- Robert Lentz (1969–1970)
- Camille Frieden (1972–1982)
- Albert Dondelinger (1983–1993)
- Jean Hamilius
- Jean Petit (2009–2016)
- Marc Hostert (2016–present)

== See also ==
- Art of Luxembourg
- Iconomaques
