= Casino Luxembourg =

Contemporary art museum in Luxembourg

Coordinates: 49.6098°N 6.1271°E

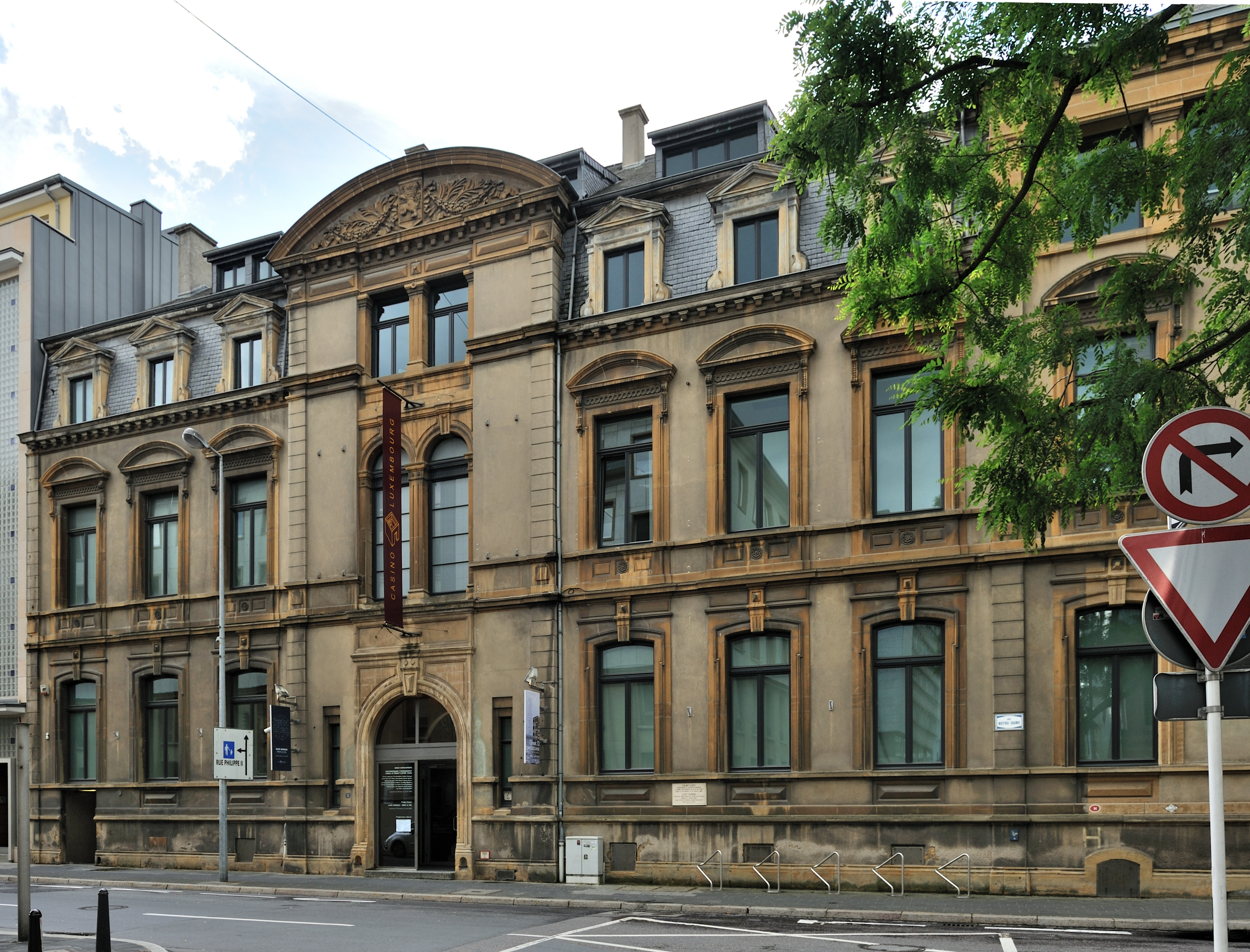
Casino Luxembourg from rue Notre-Dame

The Casino Luxembourg is a forum for contemporary art which was adapted and renovated in 1995 to fit its new role of housing temporary exhibitions of Luxembourg art. It opened in 1882 as the Casino Bourgeois, and was a centre for cultural and social events in addition to its gaming functions.

== History ==
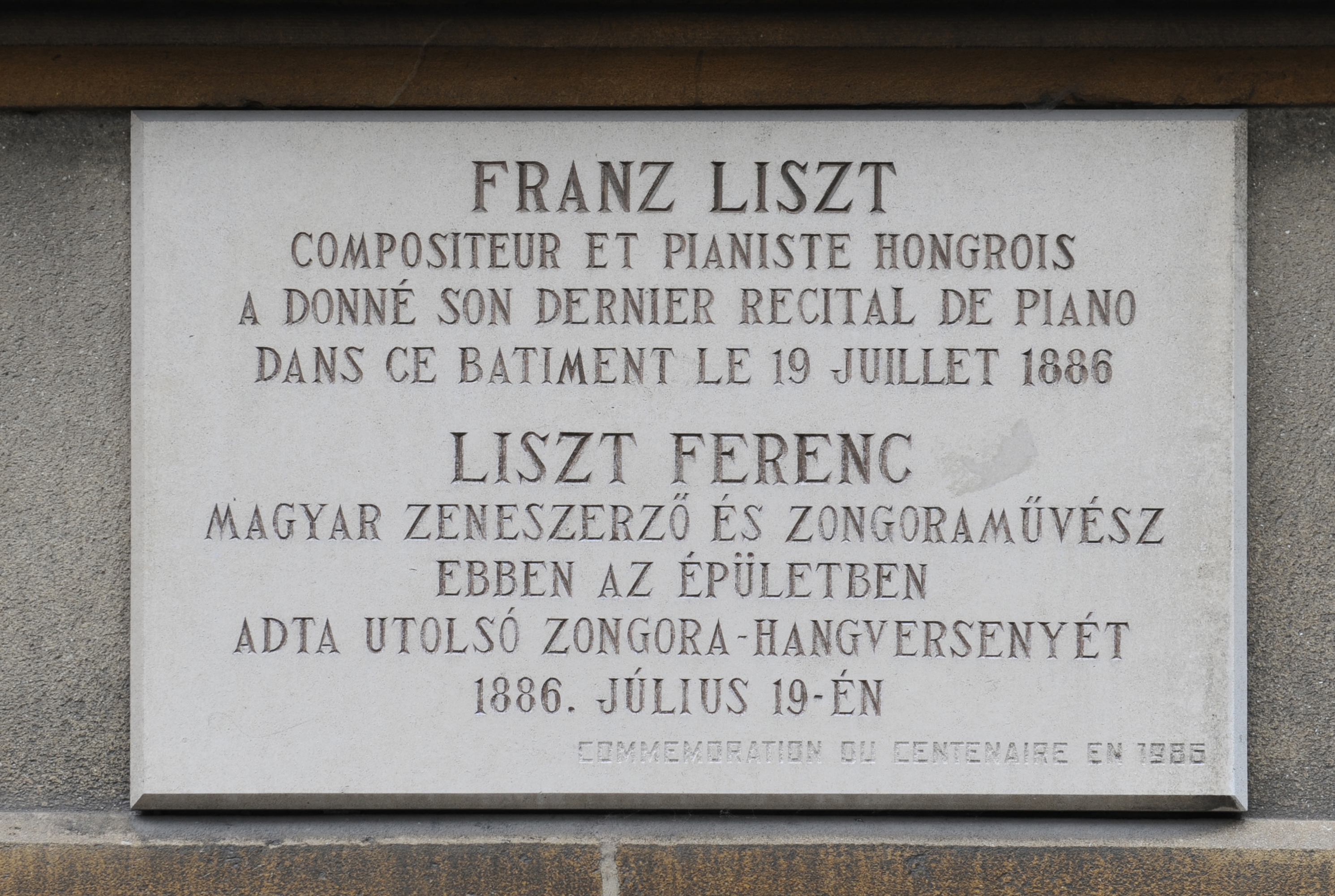
Plaque commemorating Liszt's last concert

The Casino Bourgeois, designed by Luxembourg architects Pierre and Paul Funck, was completed in 1882. In addition to its gaming activities, the casino also had a reading room, a restaurant and a number of large halls which were used for lectures, balls, plays, shows, concerts and art exhibitions. Franz Liszt gave his last piano recital at the casino on 19 July 1886. During the First World War, the building served as the Kaiser's headquarters. In 1959, after being purchased by the State, the building was rented out to the Cultural Circle of the European Communities and became known as the Foyer Européen. In 1959, a large glass and steel pavilion designed by René Maillet was added to the south side of the building.

With a view to use the building for art exhibitions during Luxembourg City's year as European Cultural Capital in 1995, the Swiss artist Urs Raussmüller of Schaffhausen's Hallen für Neue Kunst was charged with adapting the casino into an exhibition space for a limited period by creating substantially more hanging space than could be provided by the walls in the various rooms. This was achieved by installing open-top white-walled cubes throughout the building except in the entrance hall which became a reception and information centre. In March 1996, shortly after the end of the European year of culture, the building took on its present function of serving as a forum for contemporary art.

== The Infolab ==
The casino also houses a public library and reading room. Known as the Infolab, it contains some 7,000 publications on the history of art since the 1960s, 50 portfolios on Luxembourg artists and 40 international magazines on contemporary art and culture. Information is also provided on current exhibitions with videos, periodicals and books on the exhibiting artists.<

== Location ==
Located close to the city centre in the Ville Haute at 41 rue Notre-Dame, the Casino Luxembourg is open to the public every day except Tuesdays from 11 am.

== See also ==
- Art of Luxembourg
