= Nouvelle Équipe =

Nouvelle Équipe is the name of a group of Luxembourg artists after World War II who focused on innovation in art.

After the war, a number of young Luxembourg artists were looking for a new design in art; they wanted to do away with all conventional concepts and traditional forms. Four of them, painters François Gillen, Victor Jungblut, Joseph Probst and sculptor Lucien Wercollier, united to form a "New Group" (Nouvelle Équipe). They organised the first Salon de la Nouvelle Équipe in 1948, held at the Cercle Municipal in Luxembourg City from 20 May to 3 June 1948. Among those present at the opening were Nicolas Margue, minister of education, agriculture and culture, Lambert Schaus, minister of economy, and the Belgian ambassador. The artists displayed 50 works: stained glass, paintings and sculptures. The exhibition was well received and the art critics of the Escher Tageblatt and the Luxemburger Wort were enthusiastic. The latter wrote: "In this Salon there is nothing shabby, nothing conventional, nothing lowly. I am not saying that all conventions are outdated and that every element of every work is vintage. Certain formulas, both in the choice of subject, in his vision, and in the technique of representation, are given by others. Though recent, clichés are no less clichés. But the artists exhibiting here are emerging powerfully from them and are in the process of finding, each for himself, their mode of expression."

Two years later, the second salon took place. From 13 May to 5 June 1950, the State Museum in Luxembourg City displayed works by the Nouvelle Èquipe, complemented by ceramics by Colette Probst-Wurth and canvases by sixteen artists from Lyon. The opening took place in the presence of Pierre Frieden, Minister of Education, Culture and Science, Marcelle Campana, Vice-Consul of France and Alphonse Arend, president of Amitiés françaises, among others. This salon was also well received. Art critic Joseph-Émile Muller on the exhibition: "One finds there, above all, researchers, artists who, rejecting routine, laziness and easy success, endeavour to translate their emotions and their ideas into the language of our time with a personal touch." The exhibition was extended for a week and then the work of the Nouvelle Équipe was on display at the town hall of Esch-sur-Alzette (10 June to 25 June 1950).

Although it remained at two salons for the Nouvelle Équippe, the renewal of Luxembourg art was underway. During the 1950s, influenced by the Iconomaques, the focus shifted further from traditional figurative art to abstract art. Gillen, Probst and Wercollier also played a role in this.
