= Michel Engels =

Luxembourgish illustrator and art teacher (1851-1901)

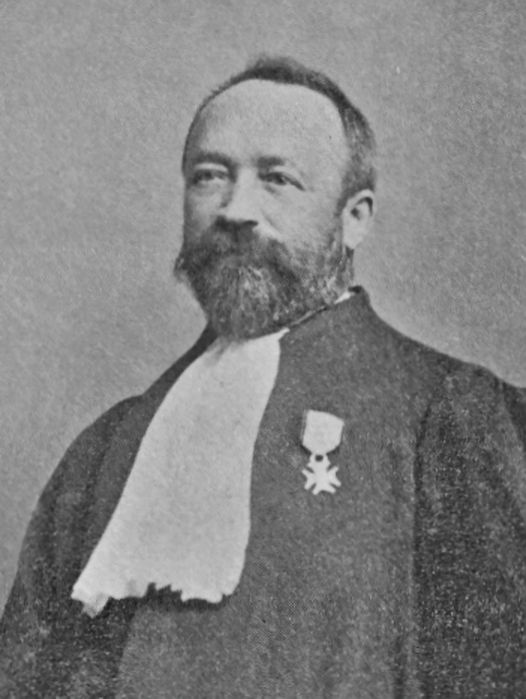
Michel Engels

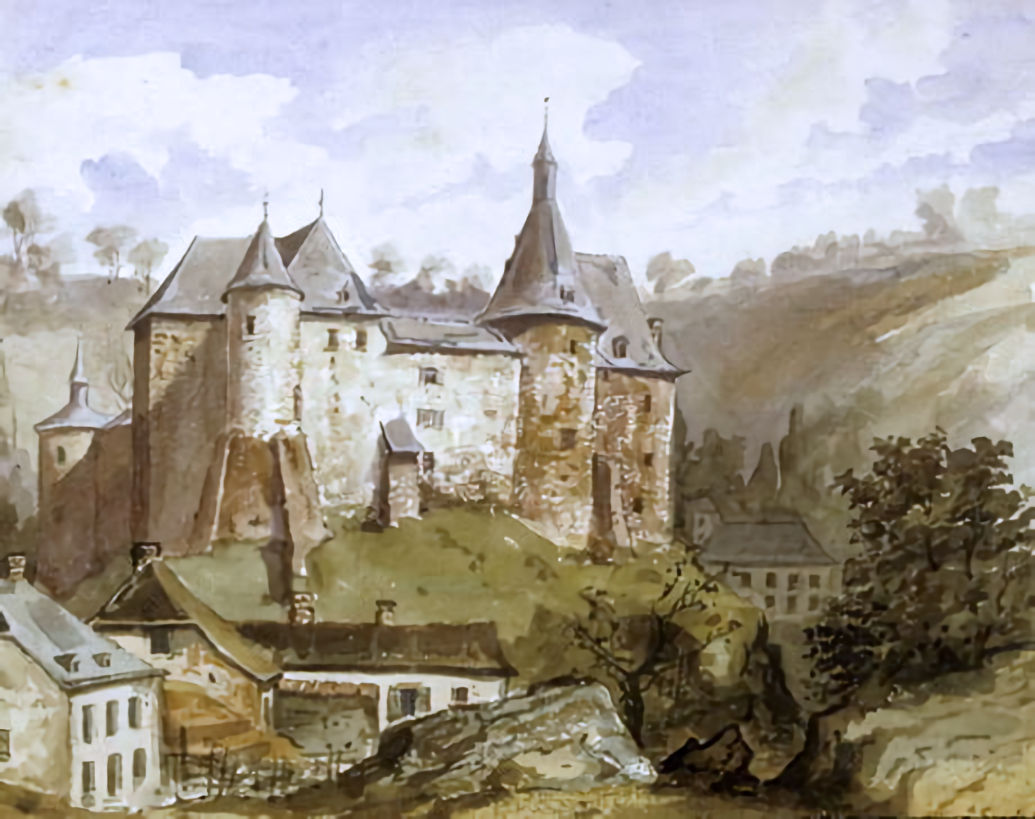
Michel Engels: Clervaux Castle (1886)

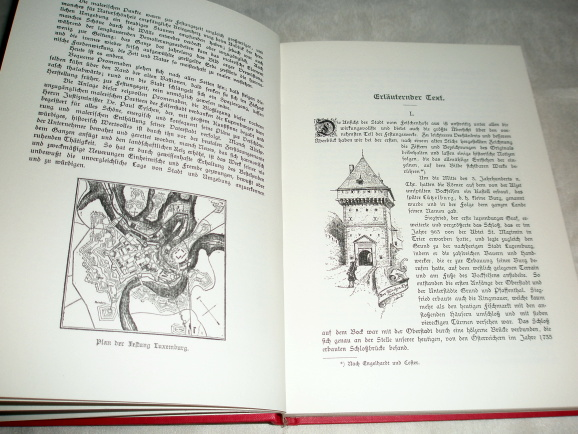
lIllustrated book by Michel Engels (1887)

Michel Engels (1851–1901) was a Luxembourgish illustrator, painter and art teacher who is remembered principally for his sketches of the fortifications of Luxembourg City and for cofounding the Cercle artistique de Luxembourg.

== Early life ==
Born in the Rollingergrund district of Luxembourg City on 6 June 1851, Engels studied art at the Athénée where he was one of the last students instructed by Jean-Baptiste Fresez, considered to be Luxembourg's greatest 19th-century artist. Benefitting from a State grant, he then went on to study at the Munich Academy of Fine Arts.

== Career ==
On his return to Luxembourg, Engels became an art teacher at the Athénée, gaining the status of professor in 1895. He was popular among his students who he would often take down to the Rollingergrund to practice sketching. In 1889, he published a set of 20 drawings of scenes in Luxembourg City, encouraging his students to use them as a guide. He also stimulated their interest in art by giving lectures and publishing papers, opening up a new approach to art teaching in the Grand Duchy.

Side by side with his academic career he became a highly appreciated creative artist, sketching in pencil or pen and ink, sometimes adding colour. He was less interested in painting although he has left a large picture of the Holy Family in the Rollingergrund Church. A stickler for detail, he was nicknamed "The Meticulous Engels". Specialising in religious and historical scenes, he published a number of albums including "Bilder aus der ehemaligen Bundesfestung" (Scenes of the Former Fortifications), "Le Luxembourg pittoresque" (Picturesque Luxembourg) and "Stadt und Festung Luxemburg ehemals und heute" (The City and Fortress of Luxembourg Yesterday and Today) as well as 31 sheets illustrating the closing procession during the city's national Octave festival. His scenes are depicted with fine lines but, in the absence of any figures, have a rather cold appearance. They do however faithfully represent the city's past, based as they are on lithographs by Jean-Baptiste Fresez or Nicolas Liez or early photographs by pioneers such as Pierre Brandebourg.

In addition to his own historical drawings, he illustrated books and magazines and wrote accounts of his travels to Budapest, Munich and Vienna or to Italy and Switzerland. His account of his stays in Paris tells how he met the famous Hungarian painter Mihály Munkácsy who subsequently invited him to the Château de Colbach and gave him an album of his sketches. He also published several illustrated works on art and contributed articles to the German press. Finally, he also painted a few watercolours including those of the castles of Bourscheid and Clervaux.

== Awards and affiliations ==
- Knight of the Order of Adolphe of Nassau
- Member of the Grand Ducal Institute
- Cofounder of the Cercle artistique de Luxembourg (1893)
