= Le prisonnier politique =

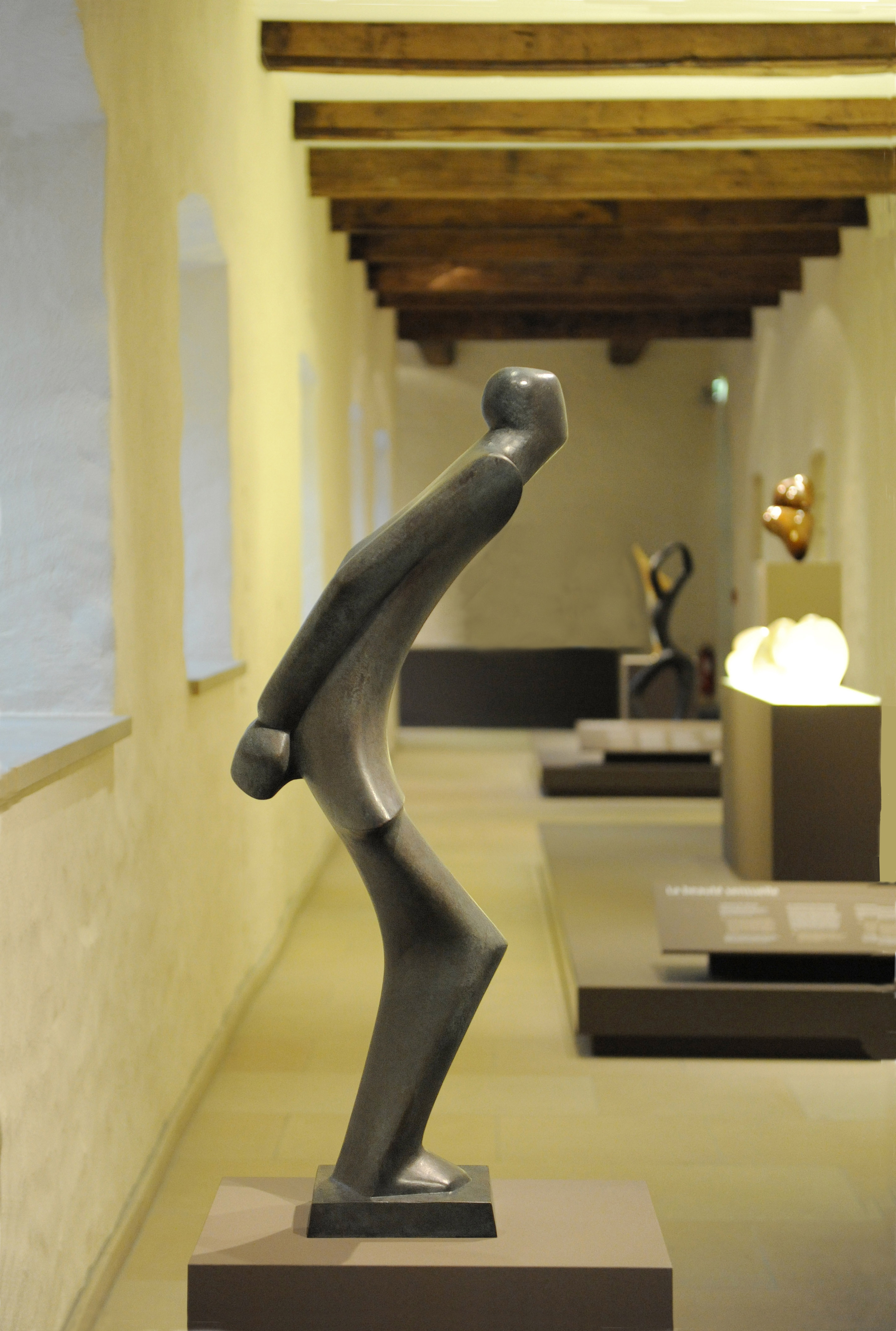
- Artist: Lucien Wercollier
- Year: 1949
- Type: Bronze
- Location: Esch-sur-Alzette, Limpertsberg and Luxembourg city

Le prisonnier politique (French; The Political Prisoner) is a bronze sculpture created in 1949 by Luxembourgish sculptor Lucien Wercollier. It exists in three different versions.

== History ==
During the Second World War, from September 1942 to November 1943, Lucien Wercollier was a prisoner in the Nazi Hinzert concentration camp, where he witnessed other prisoners being tortured. SS officers took two of them, roped their hands together and then tied their backs together. After this, they had to stay outside for days, in winter.

It was in the Hinzert concentration camp that Wercollier met Jean Daligault, a French Resistance fighter, priest and artist, who was kidnapped and brought to Hinzert after the Nacht und Nebel directive.

In December 1942, Wercollier shared food out of his Christmas package with Daligault, who was not allowed to receive anything from his family. As a thank-you gift, Daligault gave Wercollier a small sculpture that he had made out of old pieces of wood. It represented two prisoners with their hands tied together and roped together back to back. Wercollier hid this sculpture under his things, to bring it home to Luxembourg in November 1943. After the war, Wercollier made his own sculpture, Le prisonnier politique, using one of Daligault's prisoners as model.

Today, Daligault's original sculpture is still owned by the Wercollier family.

== Versions ==
Today, three versions of Lucien Wercollier's Le prisonnier politique exist. All three of them are made of bronze.

- A first version was put up in 1956 in the Musée national de la résistance (National Resistance Museum) in Esch-sur-Alzette.
- In 1969, a second version, made in 1954, was erected at the Notre-Dame Cemetery in Limpertsberg, as a part of the Monument national de la résistance et de la déportation (Monument of the national resistance and deportation).
- After his death, the state of Luxembourg ordered a third version of the sculpture, cast from the artist's original gypsum model. This version is exhibited with a part of the artist's private collection in Neimënster Abbey.

== Gallery ==
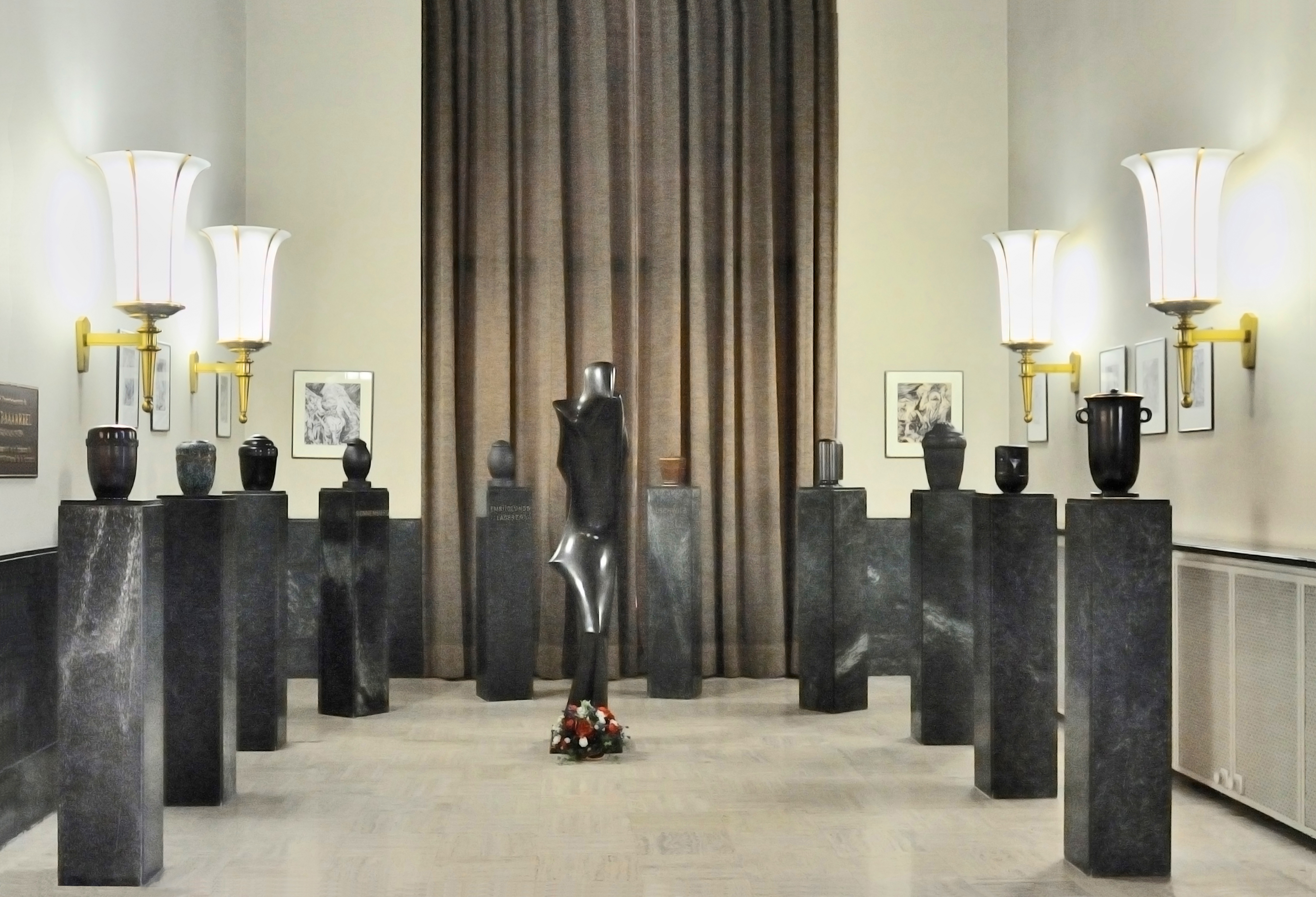
Le prisonnier politique in the Musée national de la résistance
