= Ascension (Wercollier) =

Sculptures by Lucien Wercollier

Coordinates: 49°37′N 6°04′E

- Artist: Lucien Wercollier
- Year: 1978 (1st version); 1986 (2nd version)
- Type: Marble (1st version); Bronze (2nd version)
- Location: Kennedy Center, Washington, D.C. (1st version); Strassen, Luxembourg (2nd version)

Ascension is the name of two sculptures created in 1978 and 1986 by Luxembourgish sculptor Lucien Wercollier.

== First version ==
A first version of the sculpture was completed in 1978. It had been ordered by the government of Luxembourg as a gift to the Kennedy Center in Washington, D.C. It is sculpted from pink marble and can be found in the concert hall.

== Second version ==
Eight years later, in 1986, a second version made of bronze was erected in front of the city hall in Strassen, Luxembourg, on a granite pedestal inscribed ASCENSION/ Lucien Wercollier sculpteur. The sculpture itself is signed LW 1986.

== See also ==
- List of public art in Washington, D.C., Ward 2
