= Ferdinand d'Huart =

Luxembourgish painter

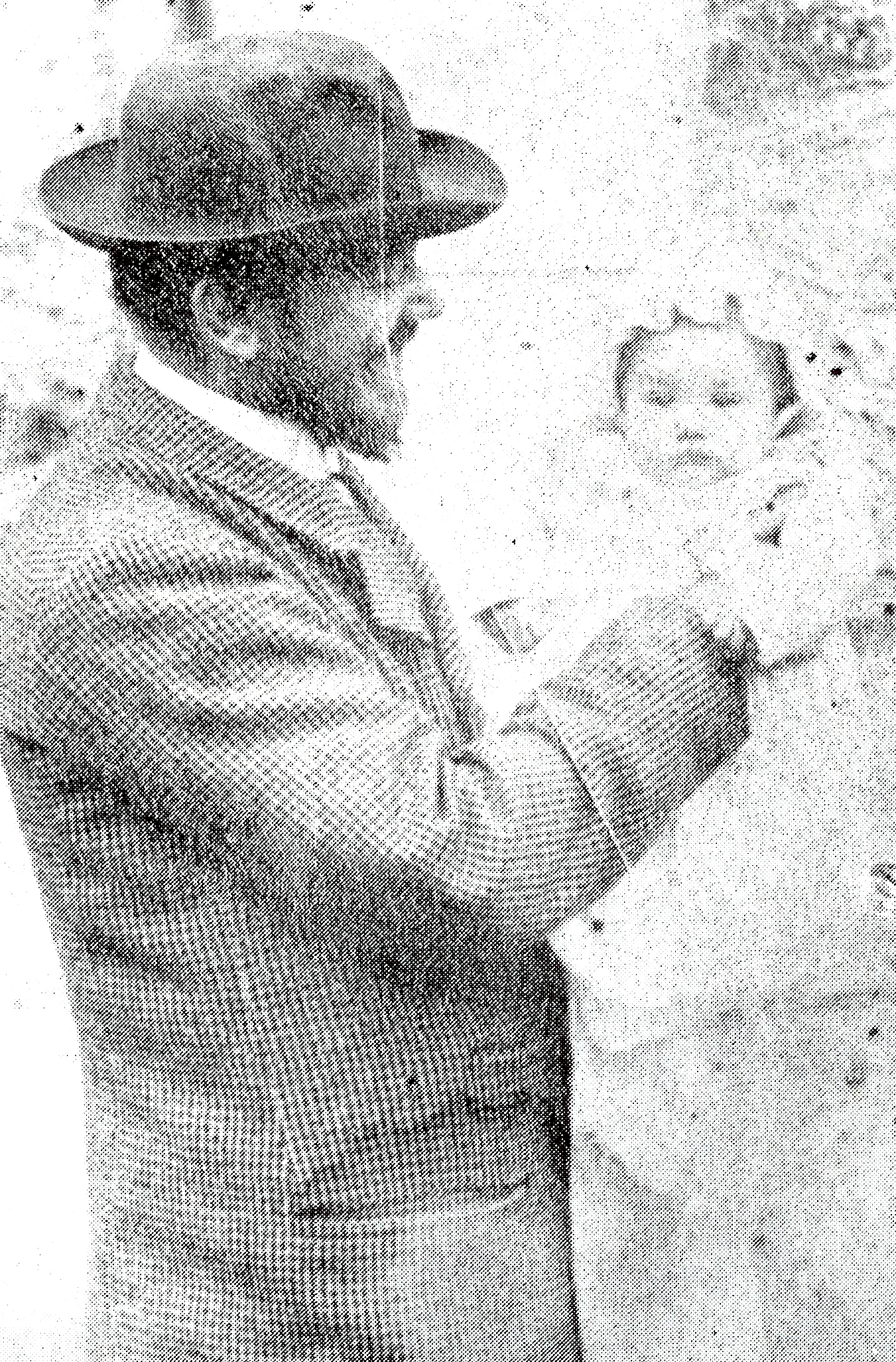
Ferdinand d'Huart

Ferdinand d'Huart (13 April 1857 – 27 January 1919) was a painter from Luxembourg.

== his life ==
He was born into an upper-class family. Ferdinand d'Huart was also known by his nickname Fenny. He studied at the art academies of Munich and Paris. He became a student of the French painter Alexandre Cabanel. He worked for a while in the Collège des Oratoriens school in Juilly-sur-Seine, but later on he returned to Luxembourg. Here he became a teacher at the Athénée de Luxembourg. He gained a reputation on painting the grand-ducal family of Luxembourg. From 1910 until 1919 Ferdinand d'Huart was the president of the Cercle artistique de Luxembourg.

His daughter, Adrienne d'Huart (1892–1984) was a painter as well.

In Bonnevoie a street was named after him: rue Fernand d'Huart.

Examples of his art

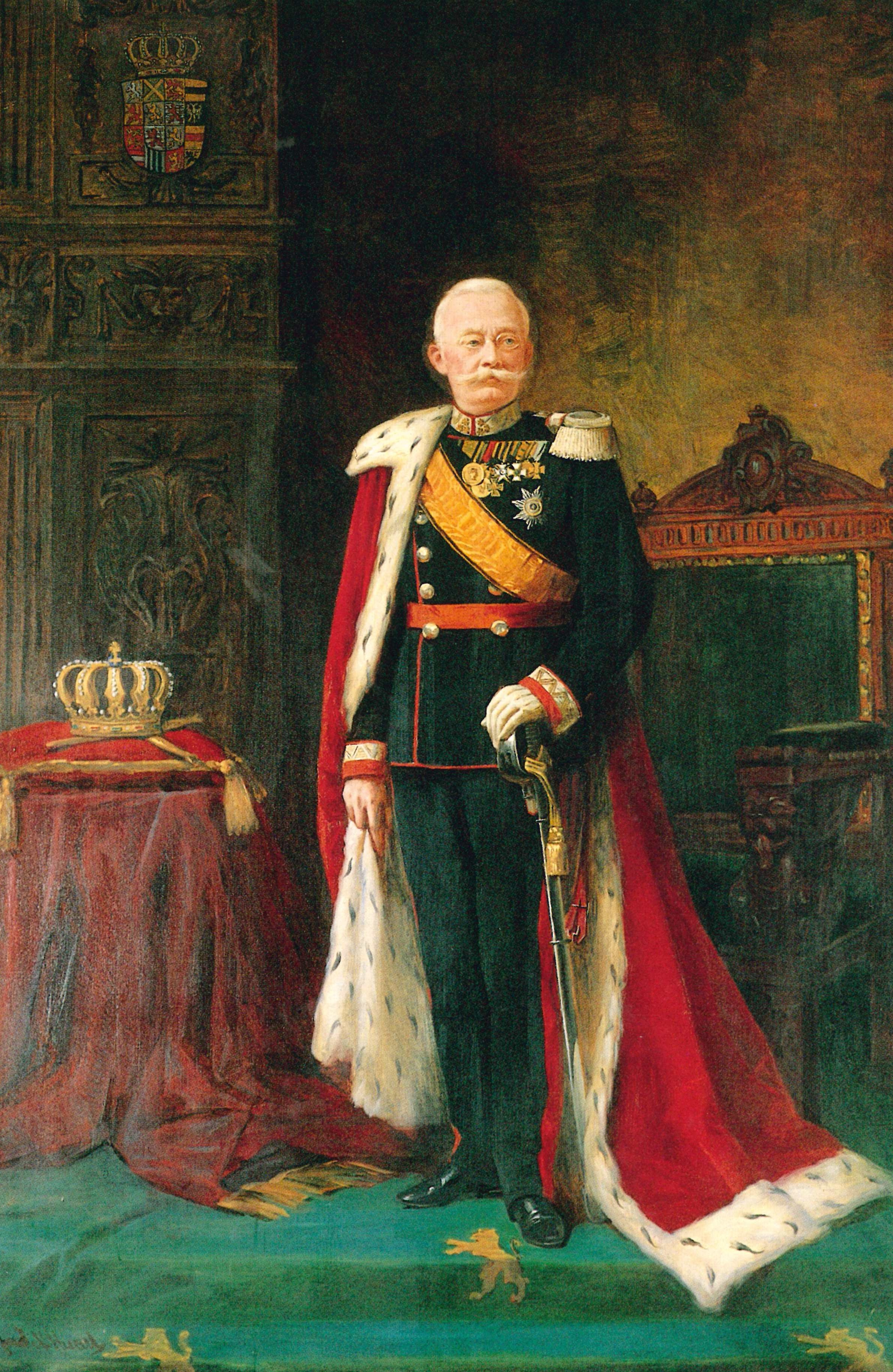
Grand-duke Adolphe of Luxembourg

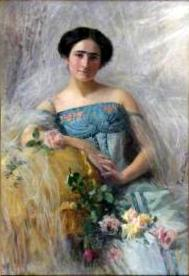
L'Élégante aux roses

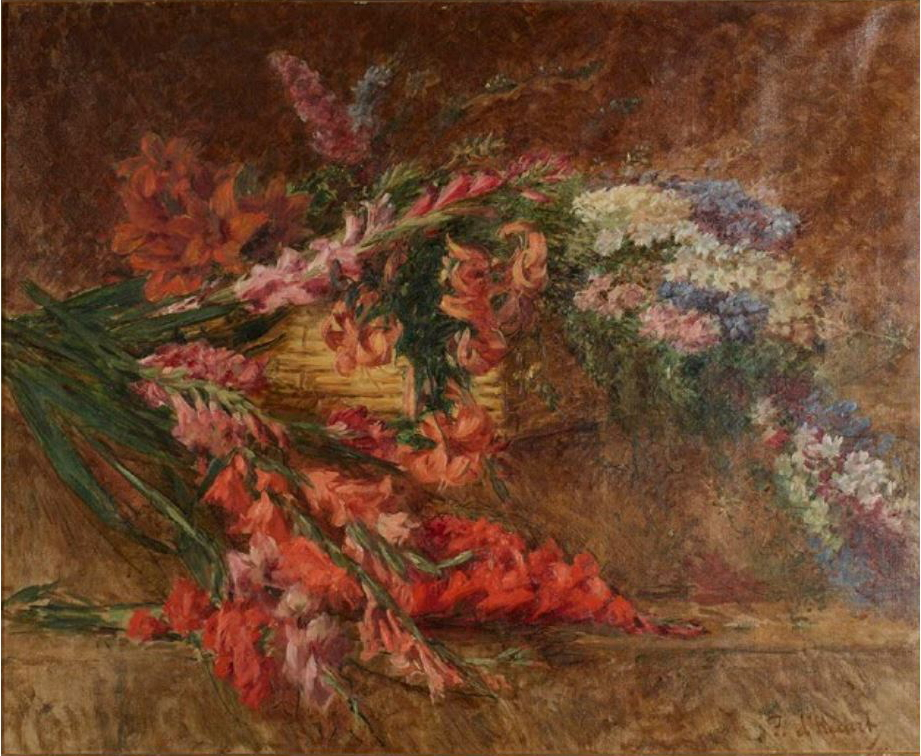
Bouquet de fleurs

== Literature ==
- APEA: Regard, an album published by the Association des Professeurs d'Education Artistique de l'Enseignement Secondaire et Supérieur, 1987, Editions St.-Paul
- Friedrich, E.: Ferdinand d'Huart, Porträt- und Blumenmaler, Revue Nr. 52, 1979
- Profile of Ferdinand d'Huart on the website of the communer of Winseler
