= Alfred Kieffer =

Luxembourgish footballer

Personal information
- Date of birth: 11 January 1904
- Place of birth: Rumelange, Luxembourg
- Date of death: 11 October 1987 (aged 83)
- Place of death: Differdange, Luxembourg

International career
Years	Team	Apps	(Gls)
- Luxembourg

Alfred Kieffer (11 January 1904 – 11 October 1987) was a Luxembourgish footballer. He competed in the men's tournament at the 1924 Summer Olympics.
