= Michel Stoffel =

Luxembourgish artist and author

Michel Stoffel (1903–1963) was a Luxembourgish artist and author. He also worked for a time in the insurance sector. Together with Joseph Kutter, he is considered to be one of Luxembourg's most prominent painters.

== Early life and education ==
Stoffel was born on 24 March 1903 in Bissen, central Luxembourg. In 1913, his family moved to Liège where he attended primary and secondary school, although he completed his schooling in Luxembourg at the Lycée de Garçons in Limpertsberg. From 1919, he took a correspondence course at the Ecole Universelle de Dessin in Paris and, after working in the insurance business for a few years, he completed his studies at the Weimar Academy of Fine Art in 1933.

== Artistic career ==
While working in the insurance sector, founding a company of his own in 1934, he also continued to paint, winning the Prix Grand-Duc Adolphe in 1936 and becoming president of the Cercle artistique de Luxembourg in 1939. After the Second World War, together with other Luxembourg artists, he exhibited in the Salon d'Automne des Artistes lorrains in Nancy (1945) and also held an exhibition of his own paintings at the Galerie Bradtké in Luxembourg (1946). In 1948, he participated in the Salon d'Art moderne et contemporain in Liège.

It was in 1950 that he first started to paint in the geometric style of abstract art, leading him in 1954 to be one of the founding members and spokesman of the Iconomaques, a group of Luxembourg artists devoted to abstract art. In 1956, he received an honorable mention at the fourth São Paulo Art Biennial. He completed two mosaics for Luxembourg's Nouvel Athénée in 1962 and became a member of the arts and literature section of Grand Ducal Institute.

Michel Stoffel died in Luxembourg City on 29 March 1963, five days shy of his 60th birthday. To mark the centenary of his birth, in 2003 Luxembourg's National Museum of History and Art held an exhibition of his work: Rétrospective Michel Stoffel 1903–1963.

== Bibliography ==
- "Rétrospective - Michel Stoffel - 1903–1963", Musée national d'histoire et d'art, Luxembourg. Catalogue. ISBN 2-87985-048-7.
- Joseph-Émile Muller & Joseph Funck, "Michel Stoffel". Publication de la Section des arts et lettres de l'Institut grand-ducal|Institut Grand-Ducal, 91 pp., 1971, Luxembourg.
- Nic Weber, Michel Stoffel, in: Les Cahiers luxembourgeois 2003/1.
