= Emile Kirscht =

Luxembourgish abstract painter (1913–1994)

Emile Kirscht (1913–1994) was a Luxembourgish painter who worked with acrylics and gouache on paper. In 1954, he was a co-founder of the Iconomaques group of abstract artists in Luxembourg.

== Early life ==
Born on 11 June 1913, he was the sixth of seven children in a working-class family in Rumelange, south of Luxembourg. His father died when he was only four, forcing him to earn a living in a steel mill from an early age. During the Second World War, the Germans deported him after his refusal to join the Volksdeutsche Bewegung but they later brought him back to work in the Belval steel factory where he remained for the rest of his working life. Without any formal education, he started to paint as a child using a paintbox he had found in a dustbin. He developed his own abilities in the 1940s, soon to be influenced by the lyrical abstract imagery of the Paris School after he went to the 1947 exhibition of French art in Luxembourg City.

== Style ==
Kirscht first exhibited at the Cercle artistique de Luxembourg in 1947 where he met Joseph-Emile Muller who, together with other Luxembourg painters, encouraged him to exhibit at the 1950 Salon de la Nouvelle Equipe in Esch-sur-Alzette and the 1954 Salon des Iconomaques. By 1959, his abilities were fully recognized when he was awarded the Prix Grand-Duc Adolphe. Although Kirscht turned to abstract painting in the 1950s with works such as Composition and Automnal, it was not until the early 1960s when he substituted acrylics for oils that he truly mastered the style. One of his most notable works, Village (1959), makes use of geometrical forms to represent the internal lines and structures of the topic.

The interaction of the different yet harmonious colours are the basis of the structures in his works. In each painting, there is an underlying colour, the proportion of white diminishing ever more as his approach matures.

== Bibliography ==
- Guy Wagner, "Emile Kirscht. Monographie d’un peintre", 1987, Editions le Phare ISBN 2-87964-000-8
- Marc Theis, Elisabeth Vermast, "Artistes luxembourgeois d'aujourd'hui", Edition Marc Theis, Luxembourg / Hannover, 1995, pp. 42–43
