= Iconomaques =

Iconomaques is the name of a group of Luxembourg artists who moved away from figurative art in order to promote abstract art. Created in 1954, the founding members were Will Dahlem, Henri Dillenbourg, François Gillen, Emile Kirscht, Joseph Probst, Wenzel Profant, Michel Stoffel and Lucien Wercollier. Some of them were previously part of Nouvelle Équipe. Iconomaque held its first exhibition on 19 June 1954 at the National Museum in Luxembourg City. The commentator Lucien Kayser saw the 1954 Iconomaques exhibition as the definitive sign that modern art had arrived in Luxembourg.

After a second exhibition in 1959, the group did not arrange any further activities. The various artists of the Iconomaques played a dominant role in Luxembourg's art landscape until the 1970s.
