= Lucien Wercollier =

Luxembourgish sculptor

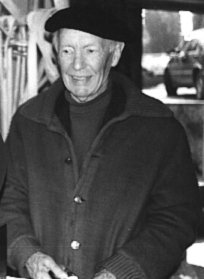
- Wercollier in 1995
- Born: Jean-François Lucien Wercollier; 26 July 1908; Hollerich, Luxembourg
- Died: 24 April 2002 (age 93); Luxembourg City, Luxembourg
- Education: Académie Royale des Beaux-Arts (1927–1931); École nationale supérieure des beaux-arts in Paris (1931–1933)
- Known for: sculpting

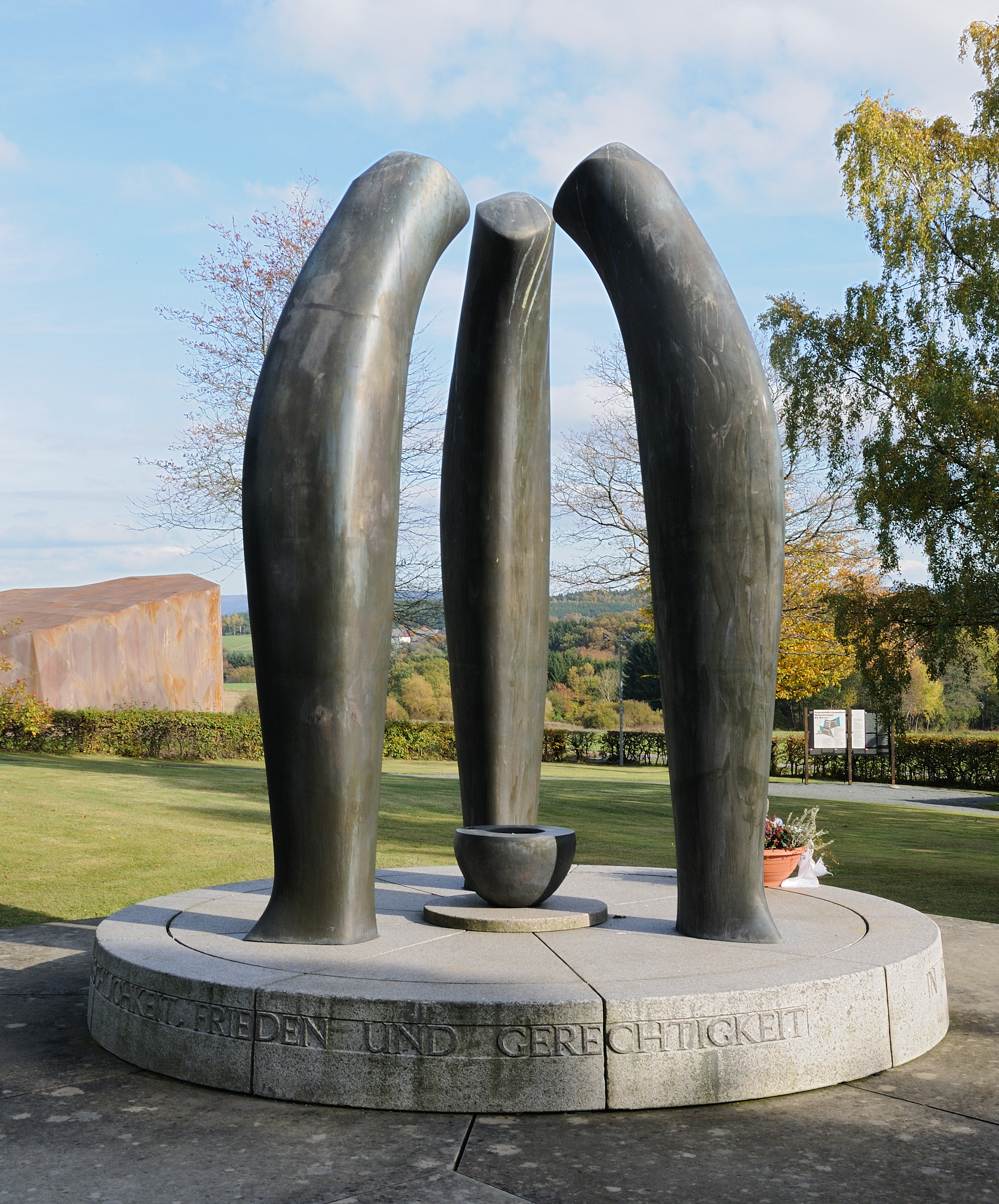
Bronze monument by Wercollier at the Hinzert Concentration Camp near Trier and the Luxembourg border

Jean-François Lucien Wercollier (26 July 1908 – 24 April 2002) was a Luxembourgish sculptor. While he worked primarily in bronze and marble, some of his work is sculpted in wood, alabaster, stone and onyx. His public monuments in bronze and marble are of particular importance. Works by Wercollier can be found in public places and museums in Belgium, France, Germany, Israel, Luxembourg, Switzerland and the United States.

== Early life ==
During the German occupation of Luxembourg in World War II, Wercollier refused to join the Reichskulturkammer, the Nazi organization that ensured all artists' works were of an acceptably "Aryan" spirit. This refusal put him at odds with the Nazi occupiers, and when he participated in the 1942 nationwide strike, he was arrested on 4 September 1942. Wercollier was first imprisoned in the Neimënster Abbey in Luxembourg City. Today, the Abbey is home to the Lucien Wercollier Cloister, where many works from his private collection are permanently displayed. In 1965 when the lighthouse-shaped National Monument to the Strike was opened in Wiltz (which won the title of the "martyred city" for the Germans' particularly strong vehemence leveled against it in response), Wercollier created the two reliefs on the lighthouse displayed there.

Wercollier was later transferred to the Hinzert concentration camp in Germany. The camp, located just 30 kilometers from the Luxembourg border, was one of the main sites where Luxembourger resistance leaders were sent. Today, one of his best-known bronze sculptures is on the grounds of the Hinzert concentration camp where it honors the prisoners and those murdered there.

Later Wercollier was moved to Lublin in German-occupied Poland, returning to Luxembourg after he was freed at the end of the war. In 1948 he became part of the Nouvelle Équipe, a group of four Luxembourg artists that wanted to break with traditional art and sought innovation. In 1954, he was one of the founding members of Iconomaques, a new group of Luxembourg artists keen to promote abstract art.

== Career ==
His bronze monument Interpénétration stands at the Palace of Europe in Strasbourg. Wercollier's sculpture that stands in front of the European Court of Justice in Luxembourg City was featured on Luxembourg's eight-franc postage stamp in 1974. Another well-known work is his marble monument La Vague ("The Wave"), located on the grounds of the Neuro-Psychiatric Hospital (Centre hospitalier neuro-psychiatrique) in Ettelbruck, Luxembourg.

When nations around the world gave gifts of art works for display at the Kennedy Center in Washington, D.C., the government of Luxembourg donated Wercollier's sculpture Ascension as its gift to honor John F. Kennedy. Another notable work of Wercollier is his sculpture Altius ("Higher")—a tribute to the sport of pole vaulting—which stands in the Olympic Sculpture Garden at the Olympic Museum in Lausanne, Switzerland.

Among his best-known works are sculptures dealing with the Nazi occupation of Luxembourg during World War II. For example, his bronze The Political Prisoner stands at the National Monument to the Resistance and to the Deportation at the Notre-Dame Cemetery in Limpertsberg, Luxembourg City. It is also exhibited at the National Resistance Museum in Esch-sur-Alzette.

Lucien Wercollier also designed the sculpture that is given to recipients of the Vision for Europe Award.

== Personal life ==
In 1937, Wercollier married the pioneer dentist, Yvonne Schmit. She was the daughter of the judge and Cabinet minister, Étienne Schmit.

== Bibliography ==
- Joseph-Émile Muller, 1976. Lucien Wercollier. Collection: Les Maîtres de la Sculpture Contemporaine. Arted, Éditions d'Art, Paris. 49 pages. ISBN 2-85067-038-3.
- Joseph-Émile Muller, 1983. Lucien Wercollier. Publication de la Section des arts et lettres de l'Institut grand-ducal. Imprimerie Saint-Paul, Luxembourg. 132 pages. Sans ISBN.

Other publications:

- Paul Bertemes (coord.), 2005. Lucien Wercollier au cloître de l'Abbaye Neumünster. Catalogue édité à l’occasion de l’installation des sculptures de la collection privée de l’artiste au Centre culturel de rencontre Abbaye de Neumünster. 64 pp. ISBN 2-9599867-2-5.
- Linda Eischen (coord.), 2003. Wercollier et ses amis peintres Gillen, Stoffel, Trémont. Exposition à la Villa Vauban. Catalogue de l’exposition du 30 avril au 7 septembre 2003. (Sans indication du nom de l’imprimeur). ISBN 2-919878-48-4.
- Josée Kirps, 2001. Lucien Wercollier. In Robert Theisen (coord.) : Luxembourg sculptures. Skulpturen - Sculptures. Éditions Îlôts, Steinsel, Luxembourg. ISBN 2-87996-932-8. (See the pp. 123–127 for L. Wercollier).
- Joseph-Émile Muller, 1988. Lucien Wercollier pour son 80e anniversaire. Les Cahiers luxembourgeois no 2: 17-24.
- Ragon M. & M. Seuphor, 1974. Wercollier Lucien. L'art abstrait 1945-1970. Biographie des artistes. Ed. Maeght, Paris.
- Joseph-Émile Muller, 1954. Lucien Wercollier et la sculpture moderne. Les Cahiers luxembourgeois, no 3.

== External sources ==
- Lucien Wercollier on the Website of the National Museum of History and Art (Musée national d'histoire et d'art), Luxembourg
- Picture of the sculpture Altius in Lausanne
- Review of the Wercollier book by J.-E. Muller
