= Wenzel Profant =

Luxembourgish sculptor (1913–1989)

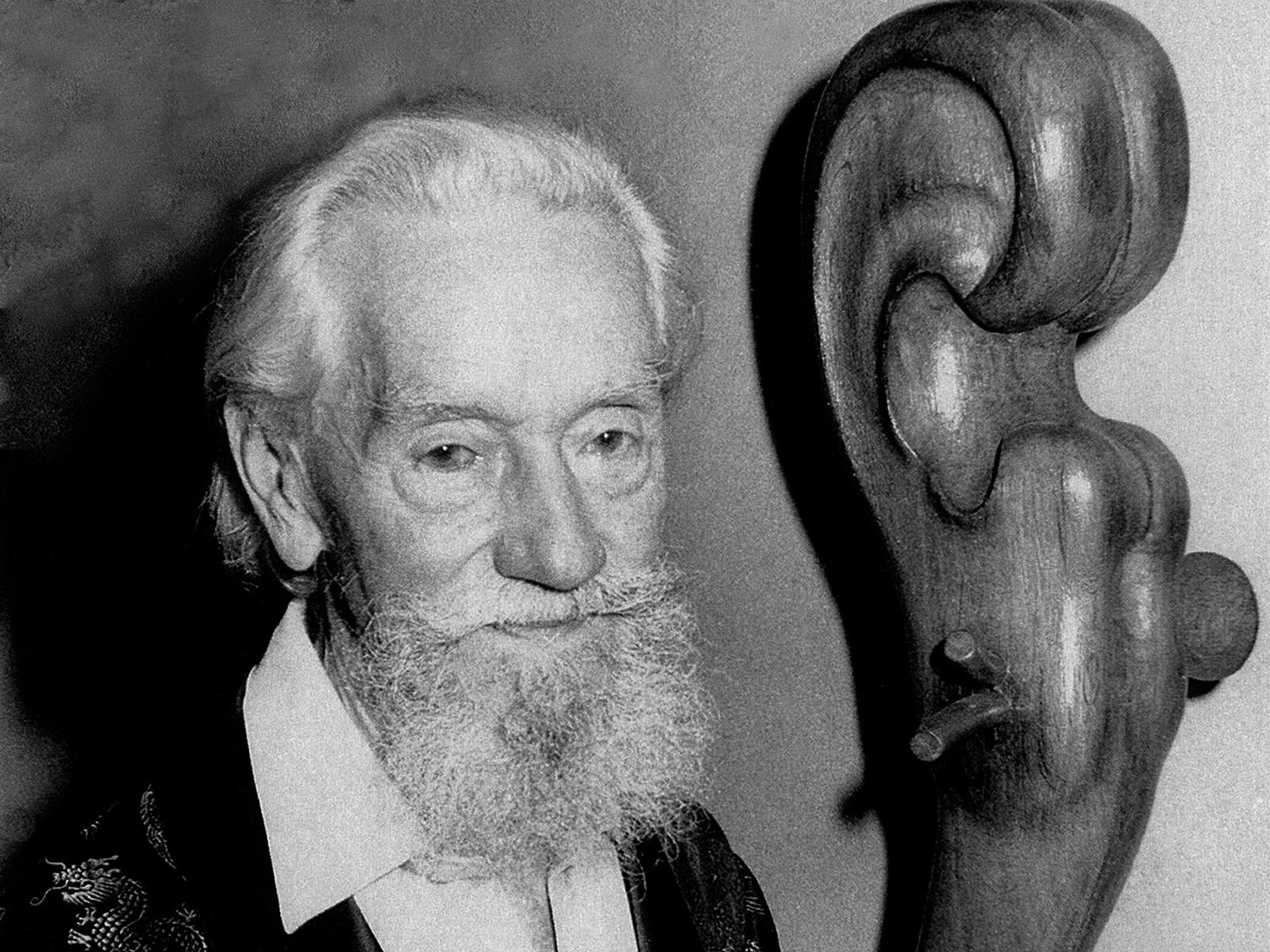
- Born: 21 July 1913; Dudelange, Luxembourg
- Died: 20 January 1989 (aged 75); Luxembourg, Luxembourg
- Occupation: Sculptor

Wenzel Profant (21 July 1913 – 20 January 1989) was a Luxembourgish sculptor. His work was part of the sculpture event in the art competition at the 1936 Summer Olympics.
