= Foni Tissen =

Foni (Alphonse) Tissen (1909–1975) was a Luxembourgish schoolteacher and artist who is remembered principally for his hyperrealistic, darkly humorous paintings, many of which were self-portraits.

== Early life and education ==
Tissen was born on 3 June 1909 in Rumelange in the south of Luxembourg. After primary school in Rumelange, he attended the Lycée Poincaré in Nancy before studying painting and architecture at the Ecole des Beaux-Arts in Paris. There he met the Luxembourg sculptor Auguste Trémont who not only became a key advisor but a close friend for the rest of his life. In 1929, he embarked on a lengthy world trip on a passenger liner before continuing his studies a few years later in Munich and Brussels.

== Career ==
In 1939, together with other artists, he represented Luxembourg at the 1939 New York World's Fair. Back in Luxembourg where he wanted to be a teacher, he discovered that his French qualifications were not valid and he had to resit his school leaving certificate before he could be appointed. In September 1942, after taking part in the strike against the German occupation, he was deported together with seven other teachers to the Hinzert concentration camp where the inhuman conditions were to exert a profound influence on his work, calling for an ironic level of introspection.

Returning to Luxembourg after the war, he taught at the lycée for boys in Esch-sur-Alzette where he deeply impressed his students. His art was not confined to painting but extended to mosaics, frescos, stained glass windows and ceramics, convinced as he was that art in all its forms could contribute to social consolidation. In his workshop, posters, plaques, flags, logos, medals and stamps were produced, some still in use today. An effective public speaker, he also became an active member of several art associations including Art Vivant in Differdange and Amitiés Françaises du Val de Kayl.

== Artistic work ==
Tissen aimed to spread art to all parts of society in order to "elevate the spirit of man" as he put it. While his postage stamps, posters and the logo for the emergency services have become part of Luxembourg's collective memory, his close attachment to his native Rumelange and the area's Red Rocks can be seen in his landscapes and engravings.

He illustrated the 1972 Luxembourg postage stamp commemorating the 100th anniversary of the publication of Renart.

The most typical part of his work is however the series of paintings he referred to as his Maennerscher or little men, many of them self-portraits constituting a human one-man comedy. The symbols he uses guide the spectator to the extensive workings of his imagination. All in all, his work reveals his search for what he called "the truth which is beauty and sincerity".

When he died in Luxembourg City on 5 February 1975, Tissen left an extensive collection of paintings and other artistic artifacts, most of which are presented in the commemorative book Rétrospective Foni Tissen 100 Joer.
