= Grand Ducal Institute =

National Academy of Luxembourg

Grand Ducal Institute (French: Institut Grand-Ducal) is the national academy of Luxembourg. It is based in Luxembourg City, in the south of the country.

The Institute incorporates six subsections, each dedicated to a separate field of academic research:

- History (Section Historique), established in 1868
- Linguistics, ethnology, and onomastics (Section de Linguistic, d'Ethnologie, et d'Onomastique), established in 1935
- Natural sciences, physics, and mathematics (Section des Sciences Naturelles, Physiques, Mathématiques), established in 1868
- Medicine (Sciences médicales), established in 1868
- The arts and literature (Section des Arts et Lettres), established in 1962
- Philosophy, law, and political science (Section des Sciences Morales et Politiques), established in 1966

== History ==
The "Royal Grand Ducal Institute" was created on 24 October 1868 from the merger of three organisations, the Société archéologique, the Société des sciences naturelles and the Société des sciences médicales. The Royal Grand Ducal Institute was divided into three sections:

- Historical section (Section des sciences historiques)
- Natural science and mathematics section (Section des sciences naturelles et mathématiques)
- Medical science section (Section des sciences médicales)

After William III's death in 1890, the Royal Grand Ducal Institute became the Grand Ducal Institute.

The Société luxembourgeoise d'études linguistiques et dialectologiques à Luxembourg became the fourth Institute section in 1935, the Section de linguistique, de folklore et de toponymie. In 1962, a fifth was added, the Section des arts et lettres. The sixth was added in 1966: the Section des sciences morales et politiques.
