= List of Luxembourgers =

This is a list of people from Luxembourg.

== Politics ==
- Jean (1921–2019), Grand Duke of Luxembourg (1964-2000)
- Henri (born 1955), Grand Duke of Luxembourg (2000-2025)
- Guillaume V (born 1981), Grand Duke of Luxembourg (since 2025)
- Victor Bodson (1902–1984), Minister for Justice (1940-1947; 1951-1959), Righteous Among the Nations
- Félicie Erpelding-Schlesser (1883–1970), municipal politician
- Jean-Claude Juncker (born 1954), Prime Minister of Luxembourg (1995-2013), EC president (2014-2019)
- Jacques Santer (born 1937), Prime Minister of Luxembourg (1984-1995), EC president (1995-1999)
- Xavier Bettel (born 1973), Prime Minister of Luxembourg (2013-2023)
- Luc Frieden (born 1963), Prime Minister of Luxembourg (since 2023)
- Robert Schuman (1886–1963), French prime minister, founding father of the European Union
- Gaston Thorn (1928–2007), Prime Minister of Luxembourg (1974-1979), EC president (1981-1985)
- Pierre Werner (1913–2002), Prime Minister of Luxembourg (1959-1974; 1979-1984), EEC figure

== Arts and culture ==
- Pol Albrecht (1874–1975), composer
- Jana Bahrich (born 2002), musician
- Louis Beicht (1886–1943), composer
- Charles Bernhoeft (1859–1933), photographer
- Emile Boeres (1890–1944), composer
- Pierre Brandebourg (1824–1878), painter and photographer
- Josy Braun (1938–2012), writer
- Elisabeth Calmes (born 1947), painter
- Sandrine Cantoreggi (born 1969), violinist
- Sophie Carle (born 1964), singer and actress
- Claus Cito (1882–1965), sculptor
- Jim Clemes (born 1957), architect
- Simone Decker (born 1968), artist
- Michel Engels (1851–1901), illustrator, painter
- Tatiana Fabeck (born 1970), architect
- Batty Fischer (1877–1958), amateur photographer
- Jean-Baptiste Fresez (1800–1867), artist
- Johny Fritz (born 1944), composer
- Patrick Galbats (born 1978), photographer
- Hugo Gernsback (1884–1967), writer, editor, publisher
- Thérèse Glaesener-Hartmann (1858–1923), painter
- Gust Graas (1924–2020), artist and businessman
- Françoise Groben (1965–2011), cellist
- Ernie Hammes (born 1968), trumpeter
- Georges Hausemer (born 1957), writer
- Guy Helminger (born 1963), writer
- Nico Helminger (born 1953), writer
- Max Jacoby (born 1977), filmmaker
- Pierre Joris (1946–2025), poet
- Gustave Kahnt (1848–1923), composer
- Jean-Pierre Kemmer (1923–1991), composer, conductor, choir master
- Mariette Kemmer (born 1953), opera singer
- Théo Kerg (1909–1993), artist
- Camille Kerger (born 1957), composer, opera singer
- Will Kesseler (1899–1983), painter
- Jean-Marie Kieffer (1960–2023), composer
- Emile Kirscht (1913–1994), painter
- Nico Klopp (1894–1930), painter
- Anise Koltz (1928–2023), poet
- Vicky Krieps (born 1983), actress
- Jean Krier (1949–2013), poet
- Leon Krier (1946–2025), architect
- Edouard Kutter (1887–1978), photographer
- Edouard Kutter (1934–2022), photographer
- Joseph Kutter (1894–1941), painter
- Paul Kutter (1863–1937), photographer
- Yvon Lambert (born 1955), photographer
- Dominique Lang (1874–1919), painter
- Claude Lenners (born 1956), composer
- Georges Lentz (born 1965), composer
- Michel Lentz (1820–1893), poet
- Nicolas Liez (1809–1892), lithographer, painter
- Hana Sofia Lopes (born 1990), actress
- Marianne Majerus (born 1956), photographer
- Michel Majerus (1967–2002), artist, victim of Luxair Flight 9642
- Laurent Menager (1835–1902), composer
- Antoine Meyer (1801–1857), poet and mathematician
- Bady Minck (born 1960), artist and filmmaker
- Alexander Mullenbach (born 1949), composer
- Jean Muller (born 1979), pianist
- Joseph-Alexandre Müller (1854–1931), composer
- Désirée Nosbusch (born 1965), actress
- Joseph Probst (1911–1997), artist
- Harry Rabinger (1895–1966), painter
- Michel Reis (born 1982), jazz pianist
- Jérôme Reuter (born 1981), musician
- Guy Rewenig (born 1947), writer
- Nathalie Ronvaux (born 1977), poet, playwright
- Pol Sax (born 1960), writer
- Lambert Schlechter (born 1941), writer
- Francesco Tristano Schlimé (born 1981), pianist
- Arlette Schneiders (born late 1950s), architect
- Bettina Scholl-Sabbatini (born 1942), sculptor
- Pascal Schumacher (born 1979), jazz musician
- Frantz Seimetz (1858–1934), painter
- Edward Steichen (1879–1973), photographer
- Marie Henriette Steil (1898–1930), writer
- Michel Stoffel (1903–1963), painter
- Félix Thyes (1830–1855), writer
- Foni Tissen (1909–1975), artist
- Su-Mei Tse (born 1973), musician, photographer, sculptor
- Nora Wagener (born 1989), writer
- Gast Waltzing (born 1956), jazz musician, composer
- Batty Weber (1860–1940), writer
- Sosthène Weis (1872–1941), painter, architect
- Marcel Wengler (born 1946), composer
- Lucien Wercollier (1908–2002), sculptor

== Academia ==
- Emil Hirsch (1851–1923), rabbi
- William Justin Kroll (1889–1973), metallurgical engineer
- Christiane Linster (born 1962), neuroscientist
- Gabriel Lippmann (1845–1921), physicist (Luxembourg-born)
- Arno J. Mayer (1926–2023), historian
- Félicien M. Steichen (1926–2011), surgeon

== Sports ==
- Josy Barthel (1927–1992), athlete, Olympic gold in 1952
- François Faber (1887–1915), cyclist
- Nicolas Frantz (1899–1985), cyclist
- Charly Gaul (1932–2005), cyclist
- Marc Girardelli (born 1963), skier
- John Grün (1868–1912), strongman
- Bob Jungels (born 1992), cyclist
- Ryan Kees (born 1986), NFL player
- Kim Kirchen (born 1978), cyclist
- Mike Krack (born 1972), Formula One team principal
- Anne Kremer (born 1975), tennis player
- Christine Majerus (born 1987), cyclist
- Gilles Müller (born 1983), tennis player
- Ni Xialian (born 1963), table tennis player
- Andy Schleck (born 1985), cyclist
- Fränk Schleck (born 1980), cyclist
- Michel Théato (1878–1919), runner
- Fiona Steil-Antoni (born 1989), chess player, Woman International Master and gold medalist at the Women's Chess Olympiad

== Other ==
- Jean-Claude Biver (born 1949), watchmaker, cheese maker and businessman, currently president of LVMH watch division
- Katell Guillou (born 1972), French-born restaurateur running two Michelin-starred restaurants in Luxembourg
- Wilhelm von Knyphausen (1716–1800), general during the American Revolution (Luxembourg-born)
- Norbert von Kunitzki (1934–2005), businessman and economist
- René Arend (1928–2016), chef
- Léa Linster (born 1955), chef
- Susanna van Tonder (born 1988), disability rights activist, patient advocate and blogger
- Henri Tudor (1859–1928), inventor and industrialist
