= Photography in Luxembourg =

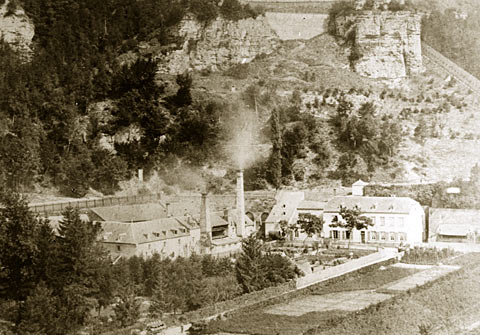
Pierre Brandebourg: Brewery in Clausen, Luxembourg (c. 1865)

Photography in Luxembourg is often associated with two figures who were born in Luxembourg but left when very young: Edward Steichen (1879–1973) was an American who made outstanding contributions to fashion and military photography during the first half of the 20th century; while Gabriel Lippmann (1845–1921), a Frenchman, was awarded the Nobel prize in physics for his achievements in colour photography. There are however many Luxembourg nationals who are remembered for recording the development of the city of Luxembourg and the country as a whole from the 1850s to the present.

== Early contributions ==
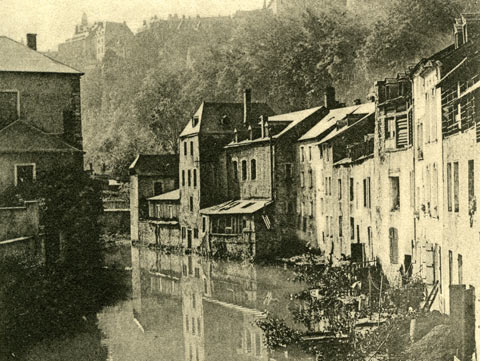
Charles Bernhoeft: Pfaffenthal, Luxembourg (c. 1904)

Pierre Brandebourg (1824-1878), who established the first photographic studio in Luxembourg City, had studied art at the academies in Paris, Antwerp and Munich before turning to photography to supplement his income. Thanks to his careful composition and lighting, having one's portrait taken "chez Brandebourg" became increasingly popular. Brandebourg also took a number of photographs of Luxembourg's evolving industries in the 1860s, some of which are stored in the publicly accessible archives at Luxembourg's Photothèque.

Paul Kutter (1863–1937) was one of Luxembourg City's early photographers. Born in Flums, Switzerland, he opened his first studio in 1883, close to Luxembourg's Bock. Both his son Edouard and his grandson, also called Edouard, continued to run the family business in Luxembourg City for many years.

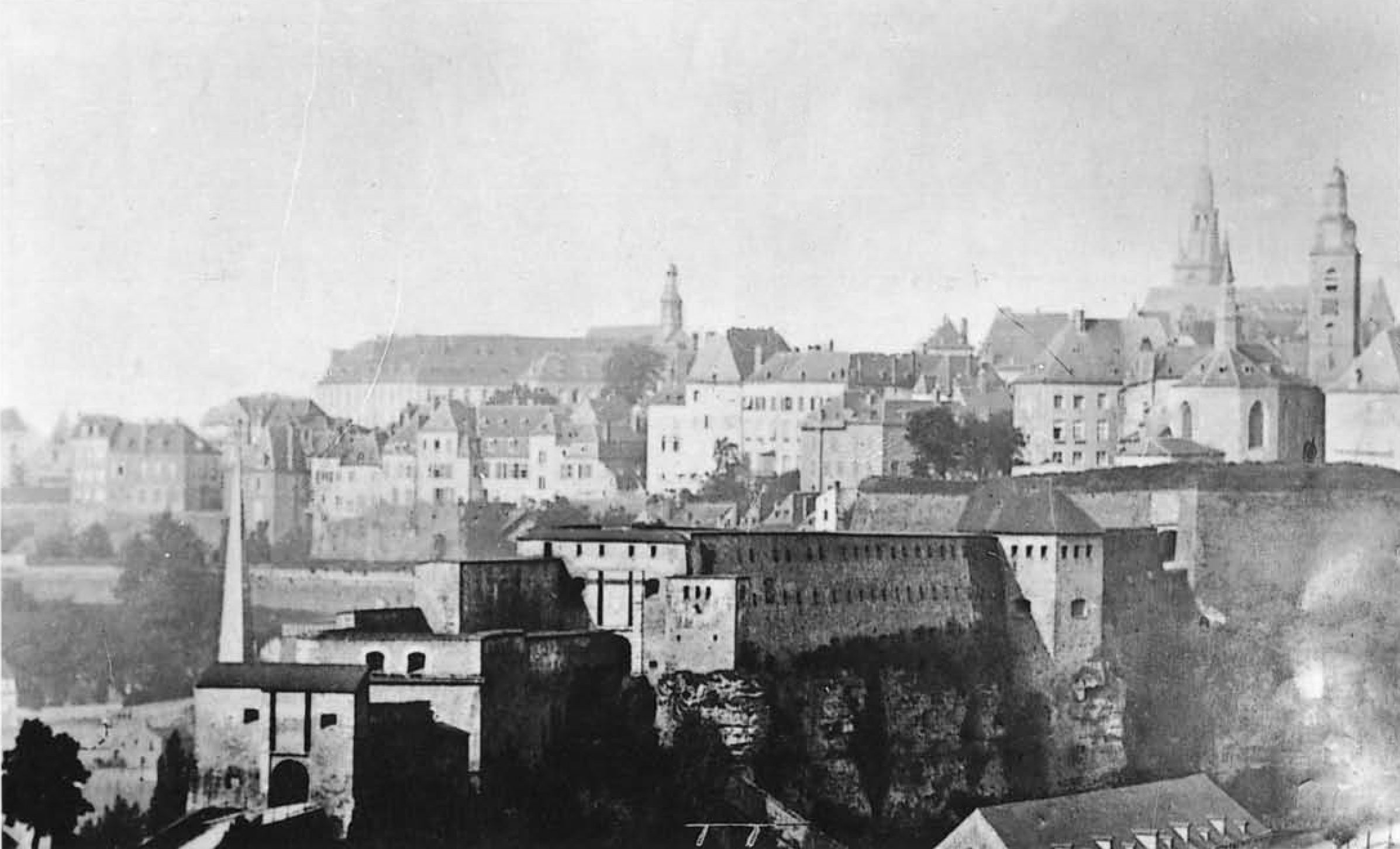
Early photograph of the Bock fortifications (c. 1867), author unknown

Charles Bernhoeft (1859–1933) took portraits of the Grand Ducal court as well as numerous landscapes, which he turned into postcards. In 1895, he was instrumental in launching Luxembourg's first illustrated weekly magazine, Das Luxemburger Land in Wort und Bild, which however could only publish nine issues. He has left a number of luxurious photo albums, illustrated magazines and above all several series of postcards, one of which contains 1,600 different images. An advertisement indicates that some 20 people were employed by his firm, Editions photographiques Bernhoeft. Much of his commercial success resulted from his appointment as court photographer in 1891. His degree of success meant that by 1900 he was in a position to construct impressive new three-storey premises for what he called Atelier Bernhoeft at the corner of rue de l'Arsenal (Grand-Rue) and boulevard Royal. For his portraits, he used the widely available carte de visite and cabinet card formats.

== A dedicated amateur ==
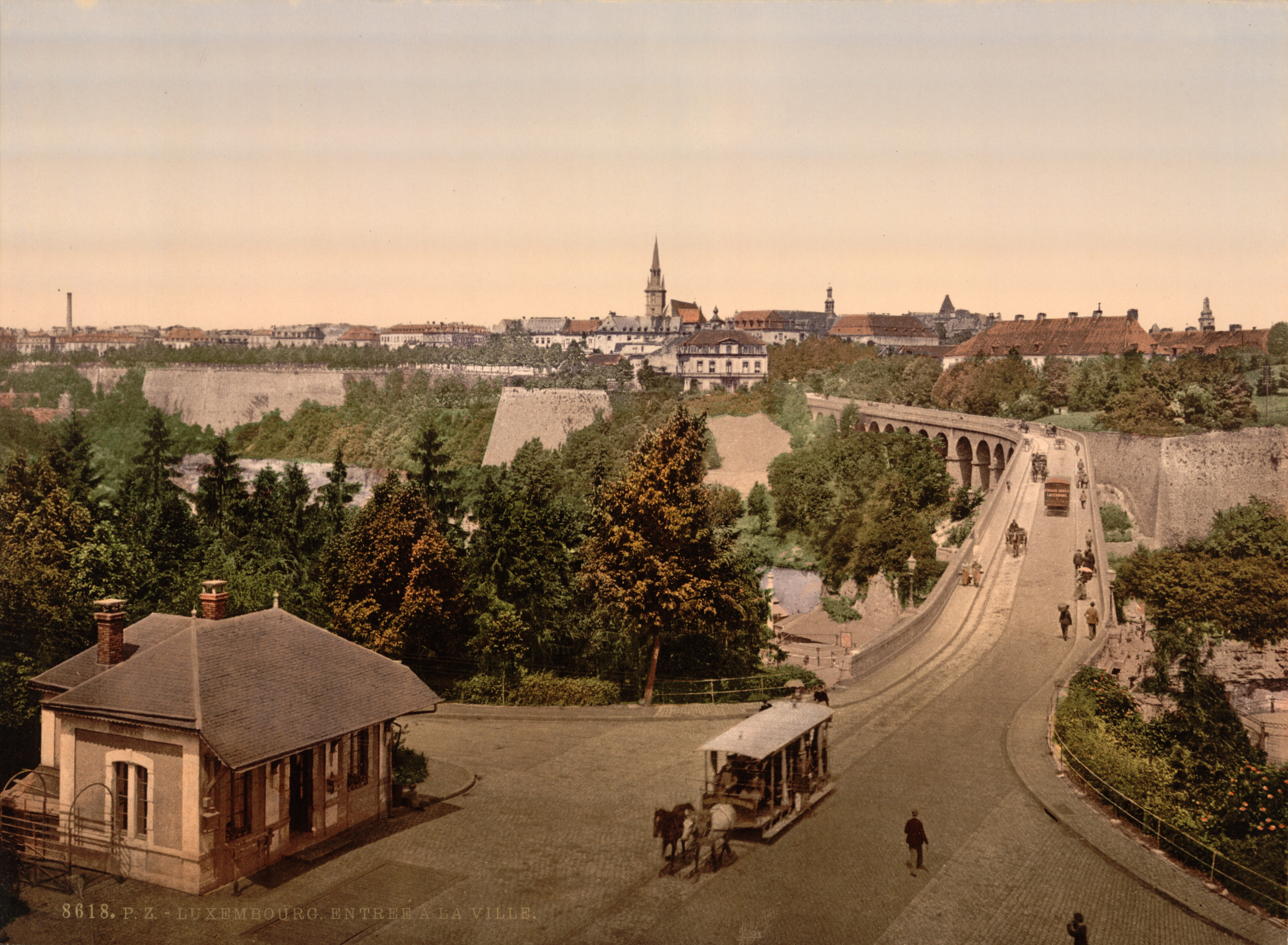
An early Photochrom colorized image of Luxembourg, author unknown (c. 1895)

Batty Fischer (1877–1958) was a dentist in Luxembourg City, but he is best remembered for his collection of some 10,000 photographs that richly document the development of the town from the end of the 19th century until the 1950s. Many of these document the development of the city's buildings, particularly facades and artistic finishings, in which he took a special interest. His shots often convey an unusual liveliness as he managed to catch his subjects in the course of their normal activities, sometimes amusingly portraying their leisure moments. Unlike other extant photographs of Luxembourg from the same period, those taken by Fischer are unusual in their number and continuity. Every weekend when he was free to walk around the town, Fischer would take the most recent examples of his work to the local authorities and receive a few hundred francs on condition he wrote a short description of the historical context on the back. In this way, Fischer left a full record of how the town evolved over a lengthy period, from the Belle Époque to the post-war years.

== Contemporary photographers ==
Yvon Lambert (born 1955) has both worked as a freelance photojournalist and completed a number of international reportages on societal issues. In 1990 and 1991, he spent long periods in Naples, which led to his first book, Naples, un hiver (1993). From 1993, he travelled to several Central European countries. In 1995, under the project: D'est en ouest, chemins de terre et d'Europe (From east to west, roads through Europe's farmlands) organized by the Centre Georges Pompidou in Paris, he was responsible for photographing rural scenes in Romania. His work was subsequently presented at the Pompidou Centre. The same year, participating in the Grand Prix de la Ville de Vevey, he received the Prix du Grand Format for his Histoires de Frontières. In the autumn of 2004, Lambert spent five weeks in New York photographing life in the city streets. This led to an exhibition at the Maison du Luxembourg à New York titled Chroniques New-Yorkaises.

Marianne Majerus (born 1956), now based in London, specializes in portrait and garden photography. She has contributed to a number of books on gardening and has received several awards. In 2010, Majerus was one of three people named "International Garden Photographer of the Year" for her picture "Layered landscape: a moment captured".

Patrick Galbats (born 1978) is a freelance photographer and photojournalist who has completed a number of artistically presented reportages. From 2002 to 2006, he worked for the Luxembourg weekly magazine Revue. Since 2007, he has been a freelance photographer.

In 2001, Galbats took a series of photographs at Luxembourg's Centre Pénitentiaire. In 2003, he completed an assignment on street people and drug addicts which was exhibited at the main railway station. In 2004, the National Audiovisual Centre published his work DOïNA, a collection he created during three trips to Romania (2001–2003). In 2004, he presented the reportage Un autre regard sur Haïti for Objectif Tiers Monde which reveals the conditions in Haiti after the departure of Jean-Bertrand Aristide.

== Photothèque ==
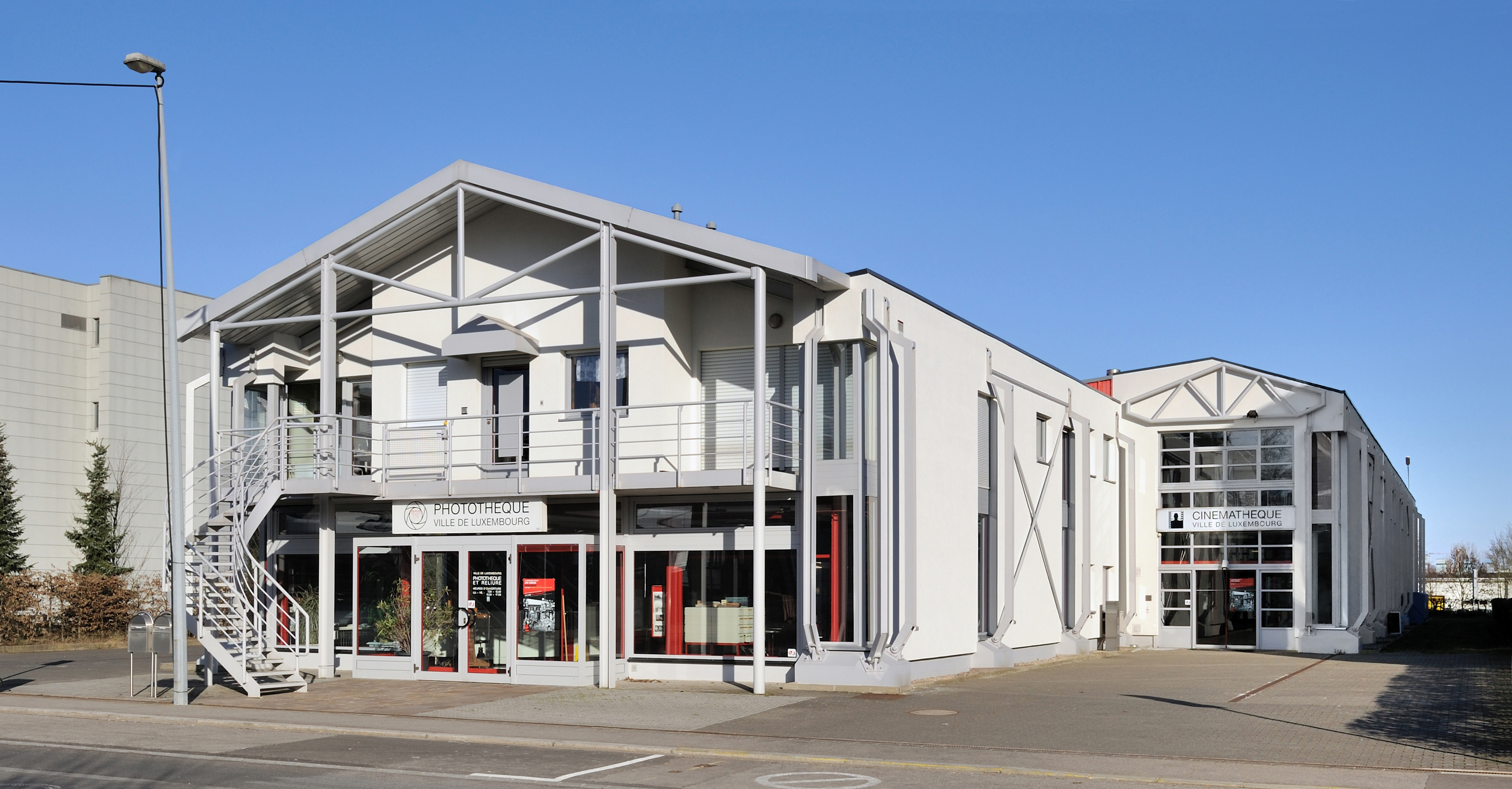
Photothèque de la Ville de Luxembourg in the Cloche d'Or district (201)

Luxembourg City's Photothèque in the Cloche d'Or district houses several large collections of photographs of the city taken between 1855 and today, comprising a total of some four million images. The first acquisitions (1985), considered the most important, consist of Bernard Wolff's collection with historic views taken by various photographers during the final period of Luxembourg's fortifications, Batty Fischer's collection of photographs documenting the city's development in the 19th and 20th centuries, and a precious series of originals taken by Edward Steichen. All the archives in the Photothèque are freely accessible to the public on weekdays during office hours, and paper copies of the images are available.
