= Edouard Kutter =

Edouard Kutter may refer to:

- Edouard Kutter (1934) (born 1934), Luxembourg photographer and publisher
- Edouard Kutter (1887) (1887–1978), Luxembourg photographer
