= Ena Lucía Portela =

Cuban novelist, essayist, and short story writer (born 1972)

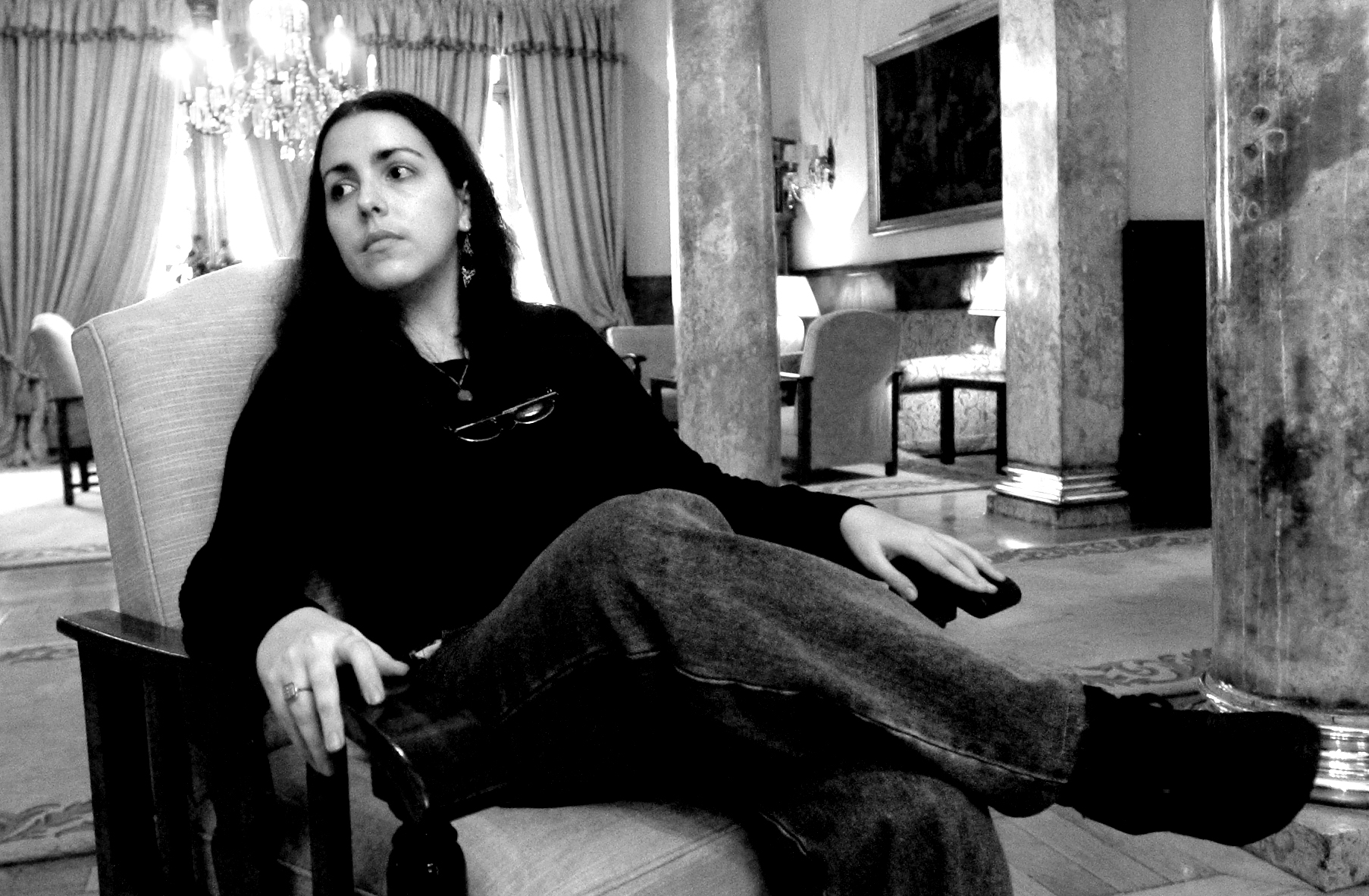
Ena Lucia Portela (2004)

Ena Lucía Portela (born 19 December 1972) is a Cuban novelist, essayist, and short story writer. She focuses on lesbian subjects.

== Biography ==
Ena Lucía Portela was born in Havana, 19 December 1972. She graduated from the University of Havana with a degree in Classical Languages and Literature. Part of the generation known as "novísimos", her first story, "La urna y el nombre, un cuento jovial" was included in the anthology, Los últimos serán los primeros. Her first novel, El pájaro: pincel y tinta china, was awarded the Cirilo Villaverde Prize in 1997 by the National Union of Writers and Artists of Cuba, and was published in 1999 by Ediciones Unión, Cuba, and by Casiopea Publishing House, Spain. In 2002, she was awarded the Premio Jaén for One Hundred Bottles. Her contemporaries include Anna Lidia Vega Serova and Karla Suárez.

Her book of short stories Una extraña entre las piedras was published by Editorial Letras Cubanas, Cuba, in 1999. In 1999, she was awarded the Juan Rulfo Prize for her short story, El viejo, el asesino y yo, which was published by Editorial Letras Cubanas, Cuba, in 2000. Her novel La sombra del caminante was published by Ediciones Unión (Cuba) in 2001, by Editorial Kailas (Spain) in 2006, and then by Bokeh press (The Netherlands) in 2016. Her work has been published in more than twenty countries and has appeared in numerous anthologies, both in Cuba and abroad. In 2007, she was selected by the Bogotá Book Fair as one of the most important thirty-nine Latin American writers under thirty-nine.

== Selected works ==
- 1999: El pájaro: pincel y tinta china
- 1999: Una extraña entre las piedras
- 2000: El viejo, el asesino y yo
- 2001: La sombra del caminante
- 2002: Cien botellas en una pared
- 2008: Djuna y Daniel
- 2017: Con hambre y sin dinero

== See also ==
- Bogotá39
