= Anna Lidia Vega Serova =

Cuban writer (born 1968)

Anna Lidia Vega Serova (born 1968, Leningrad, Soviet Union) is a Cuban writer, poet, painter and translator. She was born in Leningrad, USSR. Of Russian-Ukrainian and Cuban parentage, she has lived in Havana since 1989 and is regarded as one of the most distinctive voices in contemporary Cuban literature. A versatile writer, she has published more than a dozen books in multiple genres including novels, short story collections, poetry collections, and children's books.

She is associated with the current generation of women writers in Cuba consisting of writers such as Marilyn Bobes, Karla Suárez, Mylene Fernández Pintado, Ena Lucía Portela, Laidi Fernández de Juan, etc.

== Biography ==
Anna Lidia Vega Serova studied painting at the School of Fine Arts in Soligorsk, Belarus, graduating in 1983. She later settled in Cuba, where she developed a dual career as a visual artist and writer. Her early work was in the visual arts, with solo exhibitions in Cuba, Colombia, France, and Belarus, and participation in numerous collective exhibitions in Latin America and Europe.

She began writing in the 1990s and gained national recognition in 1997 when she won the Premio David from the Unión Nacional de Escritores y Artistas de Cuba (UNEAC) for her debut short story collection Bad Painting. She went on to receive several other literary awards, including the Premio Dador (2000), the Premio Farraluque (2000), and the Distinción por la Cultura Cubana (2006).

Vega Serova is a member of UNEAC. Her work has been the subject of academic study in Cuba, Puerto Rico, and the United States, and she has given lectures and creative writing workshops at US universities.

== Literary Work ==
Vega Serova has published more than fifteen books of fiction, poetry, and children’s literature in Cuba, Spain, Italy, Puerto Rico, Mexico, Slovenia, and the United Kingdom. Her writing frequently explores themes of identity, hybridity, memory, and the intimate conflicts of daily life, often blending irony, sensuality, and elements of “dirty realism.”

The translator of Anima Fatua into English, Robin Munby, has commented: “As a translator, I am always drawn to books that feel as though they could never have been written in English. This book feels like it could have been written by no one else. It is not just the dizzying story itself, which lurches from fairytale to nightmare in the blink of an eye, but Anna Lidia’s twisted, playful approach to language. Anima Fatua is a book that resists interpretation at every turn.”

== Selected works ==
=== Short stories ===
- Bad painting (1998)
- Catálogos de mascotas (1999),
- Limpiando ventanas y espejos (2001),
- Imperio doméstico (2005, 2000 Dador Prize winner - an English translation is being published by Amaurea Press),
- Legión de sombras miserables (2006),
- El día de cada día (2006. Also published in Italian, 2007)
- Mirada de reojo (2010; an English translation, Sideways Glance, was published by Amaurea Press in 2021)
- Estirpe de papel (2012/13; forthcoming English edition, Amaurea Press, 2026)
- Tres pasos para un pez (2014)
- Tribade brez plemena (Slovenia, 2025)

=== Poetry ===
- Retazos de las hormigas para los malos tiempos (2004).
- Eslabones de un tiempo muerto (2006, reissued in Puerto Rico 2013)
- Un jardín en miniatura / A Miniature Garden (bilingual Spanish/English edition, Amaurea Press, 2021)

=== Novels ===
- Noche de ronda (2002/2003)
- Ánima fatua (2007; subsequent editions in Puerto Rico and Mexico; an English edition, translated by Robin Munby, was published by Amaurea Press in 2025, and was the recipient of an English PEN Translates award)

=== Children's books ===
- Adiós, cuento triste (2006)

== Translations ==
Vega Serova has translated works from Russian into Spanish, including children’s stories by Andrei Kurkov and Larissa Bilevitch, Russian Silver Age poetry (A ti, dentro de cien años, forthcoming), and Dmitri Lijanov’s award-winning novel La estrella y la cruz (forthcoming, 2025). She also translated screenplays for Russian films shot in Cuba, including El oro del Gloria (2012) and El culto (2013).

== Visual Art ==
Alongside her literary career, Vega Serova has exhibited her paintings internationally since the 1980s. Her work has been shown in Cuba, Colombia, France, Belarus, Spain, Mexico, and Belgium. Notable solo exhibitions include Anna en el cielo con diamantes (Havana, 1996), Mediodía (Bordeaux, 2008), and Medialuna marina (Barranquilla, 2019).

== Recognition ==
Her novel Ánima fátua was awarded the English PEN Translates Award in 2025 and submitted for the 2026 International Booker Prize.

Anima Fatua has been featured in Latin American Literature Today.

Critical acclaim for Anima Fatua:

“An evocative portrait of displacement and desire, tracing a life shaped by exile, revolution, and emotional rupture.” (Leo Boix, Morning Star)

“A journey to the Soviet Union, around it, and back to Cuba in the 1980s that is fraught with disunion and sorrow, but also joy and desire.” (Jacqueline Loss, Dreaming in Russian)

Critical acclaim for Anna Lidia Vega Serova's writing in general

“Vega Serova’s fiction reads like a gallery of anti-heroines.” (Mabel Cuesta, Cambridge History of Cuban Literature)

“Her writing is seductive. Sometimes it provokes tenderness and sometimes pain. A novel of harsh beauty, it gets under your skin.” (Karla Suárez, author of Havana Year Zero)
