= Théo Mey =

Luxembourgish photographer (1912-1964)

Théo Mey (1912–1964) was a Luxembourgish photographer who worked as a photojournalist for various national and foreign newspapers and magazines. He also participated in motorsports, handball and athletics. His collection of some 400,000 images is archived in Luxembourg City's Photothèque. A selection of these is to be found in "Théo Mey: Trésors de la Photothèque" published in 2002.
