= Paul Kutter =

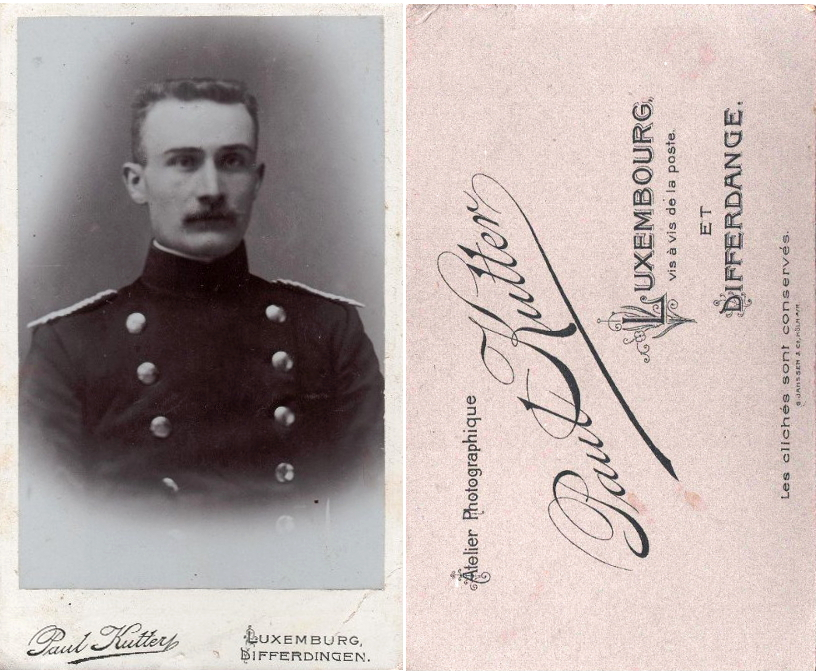
CdV by Paul Kutter

Paul Robert Kutter (1863–1937) was one of Luxembourg City's early photographers. Born in Flums, Switzerland, he opened his first studio in 1883 at 6, rue Wiltheim, close to Luxembourg's Bock. In 1904, Kutter moved his business to 3, rue du Génie, (now avenue Monterey), where Charles Bernhoeft had worked as a photographer until 1903.

Kutter's first son, Edouard Frédéric Henri, (1887–1978), joined his father as an apprentice in 1898. Paul Kutter had three other sons: Joseph Kutter (1894–1941), one of Luxembourg's foremost painters; Bernard (1889–1961) who also became a photographer; and Paul Kutter jr. (1899-1941). There was also a daughter, Catherine Louise Marie (1891–1958). Both his son Edouard and his grandson, also called Edouard, continued to run the Kutter photographic business in Luxembourg City for many years.

Examples of Paul Kutter's photographs can be seen at Luxembourg's Photothèque.
