= Lippmann plate =

Early color photography method

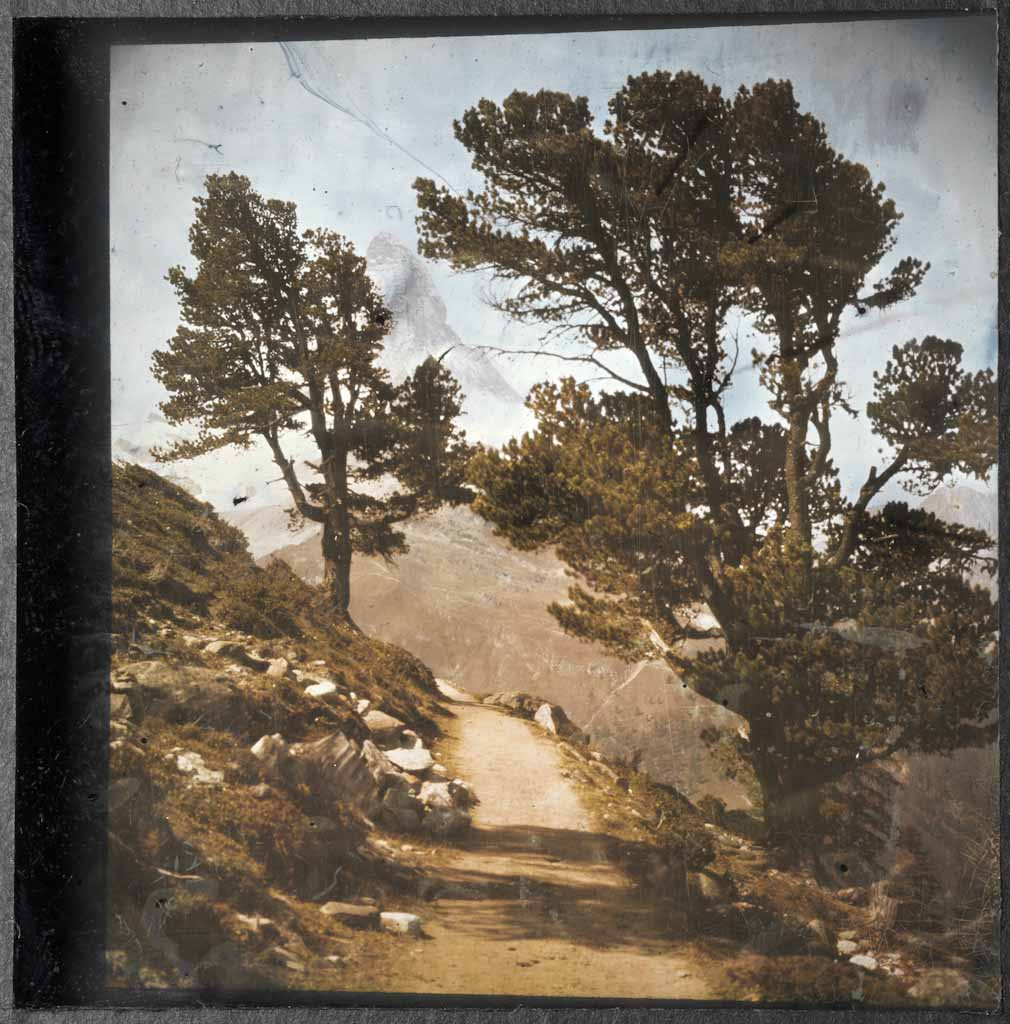
Early colour photograph (c. 1891–1899) by Lippmann of the Matterhorn

Lippmann process photography is an early color photography method and type of alternative process photography. It was invented by French scientist Gabriel Lippmann in 1891 and consists of first focusing an image onto a light-sensitive plate, placing the emulsion in contact with a mirror (originally liquid mercury) during the exposure to introduce interference, chemically developing the plate, inverting the plate and painting the glass black, and finally affixing a prism to the emulsion surface. The image is then viewed by illuminating the plate with light. This type of photography became known as interferential photography or interferometric colour photography and the results it produces are sometimes called direct photochromes, interference photochromes, or Lippmann photochromes (distinguished from the earlier so-called "photochromes" which were merely black-and-white photographs painted with color by hand). In French, the method is known as photographie interférentielle and the resulting images were originally exhibited as des vues lippmaniennes. Lippmann won the Nobel Prize in Physics in 1908 "for his method of reproducing colours photographically based on the phenomenon of interference".

Images made with this method are created on a Lippmann plate: a clear glass plate (having no anti-halation backing), coated with an almost transparent (very low silver halide content) emulsion of extremely fine grains, typically 0.01 to 0.04 micrometres in diameter. Consequently, Lippmann plates have an extremely high resolving power exceeding 400 lines/mm.

== Method ==
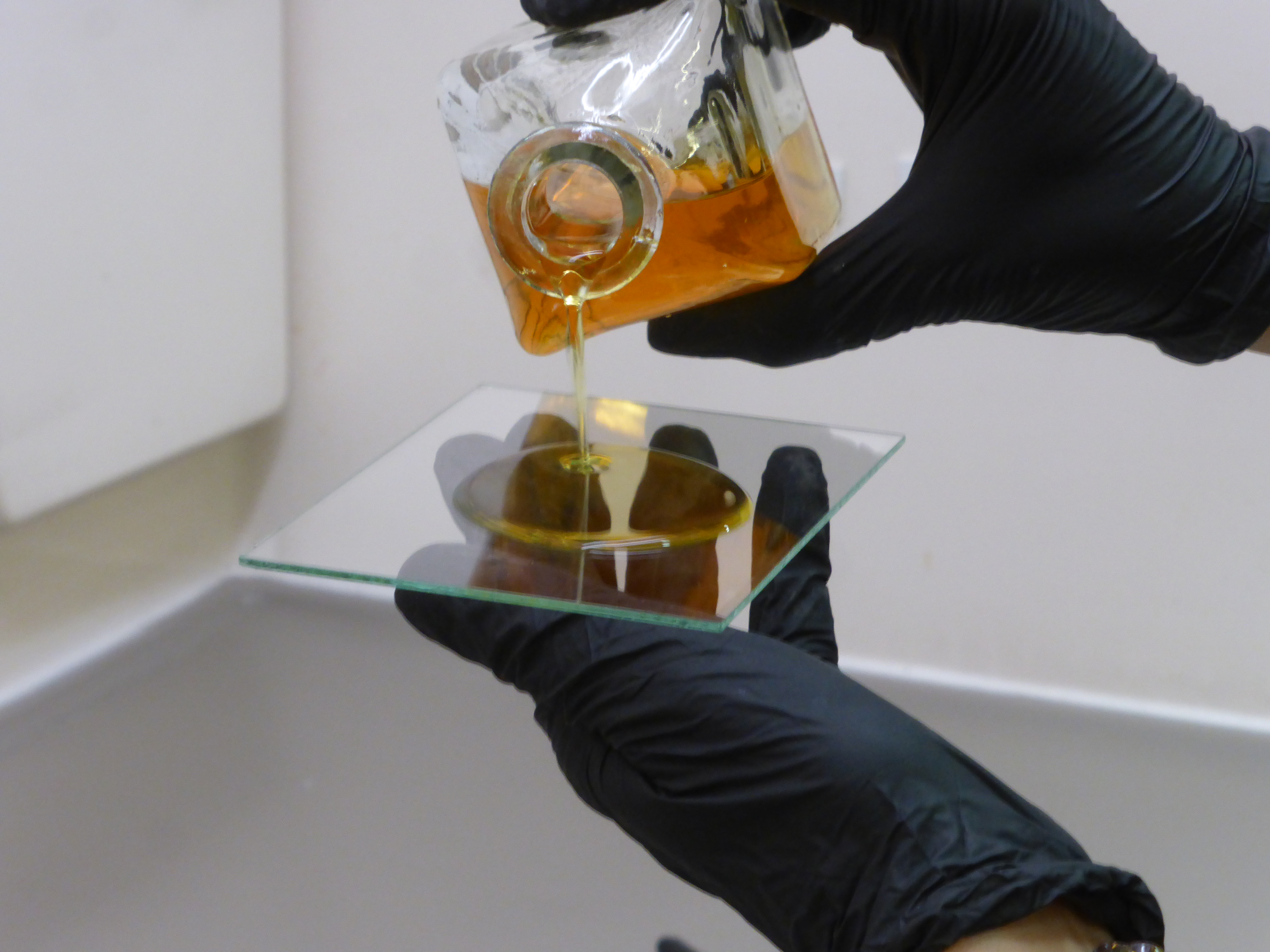
To create a Lippmann plate, a light-sensitive emulsion of silver halide dispersed in gelatin is coated onto a glass photographic plate (Shown here: collodion solution). Later, the back is painted black and a prism is glued to the front to control reflection.

In Lippmann's method, a glass plate is coated with an ultra fine grain light-sensitive film (originally using the albumen process containing potassium bromide; later and primarily using silver halide gelatin), then dried, sensitized in the silver bath, washed, irrigated with cyanine solution, and dried again. The back of the film is then brought into optical contact with a reflective surface. This originally was done by mounting the plate in a specialized holder with pure mercury behind the film. When it is exposed in the camera through the glass side of the plate, the light rays which strike the transparent light-sensitive film are reflected back on themselves and, by interference, create standing waves. The standing waves cause exposure of the emulsion in diffraction patterns. The developed and fixated diffraction patterns constitute a Bragg condition in which diffuse, white light is scattered in a specular fashion and undergoes constructive interference in accordance to Bragg's law. The result is an image having very similar colours as the original using a black and white photographic process.

For this method Lippmann won the Nobel Prize in Physics in 1908.

The colour image can only be viewed in the reflection of a diffuse light source from the plate, making the field of view limited, and therefore not easily copied with conventional techniques. The method was very insensitive with the emulsions of the time and it never came into general use. Another reason Lippmann's process of colour photography did not succeed can be found in the invention of the autochrome plates by the Lumière brothers. A technique derived from the Lippmann technique has been proposed as a method of producing images which can easily be viewed, but not copied, for security purposes.

== Gallery ==
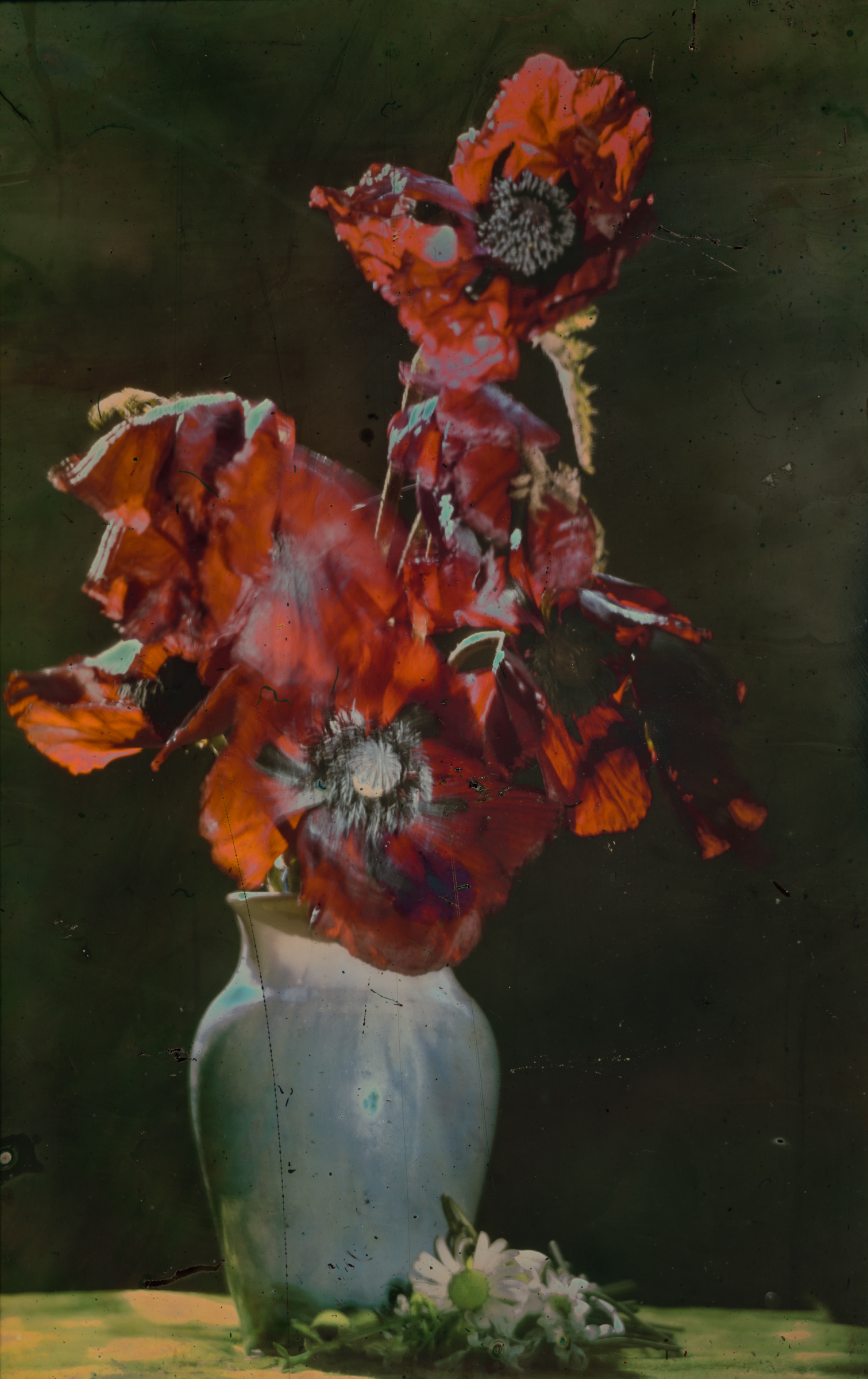
A still life by Lippmann

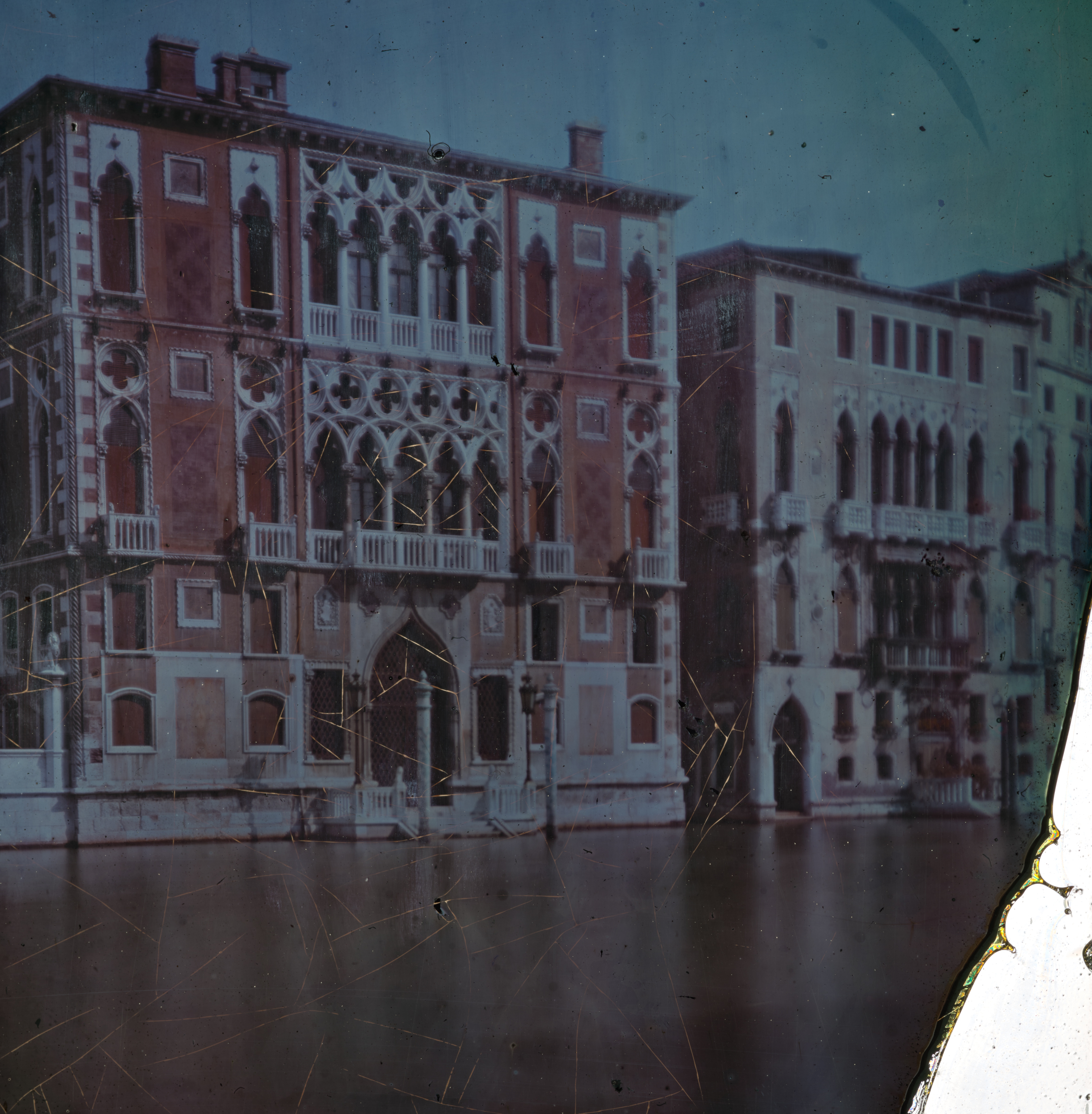
Venice by Lippmann

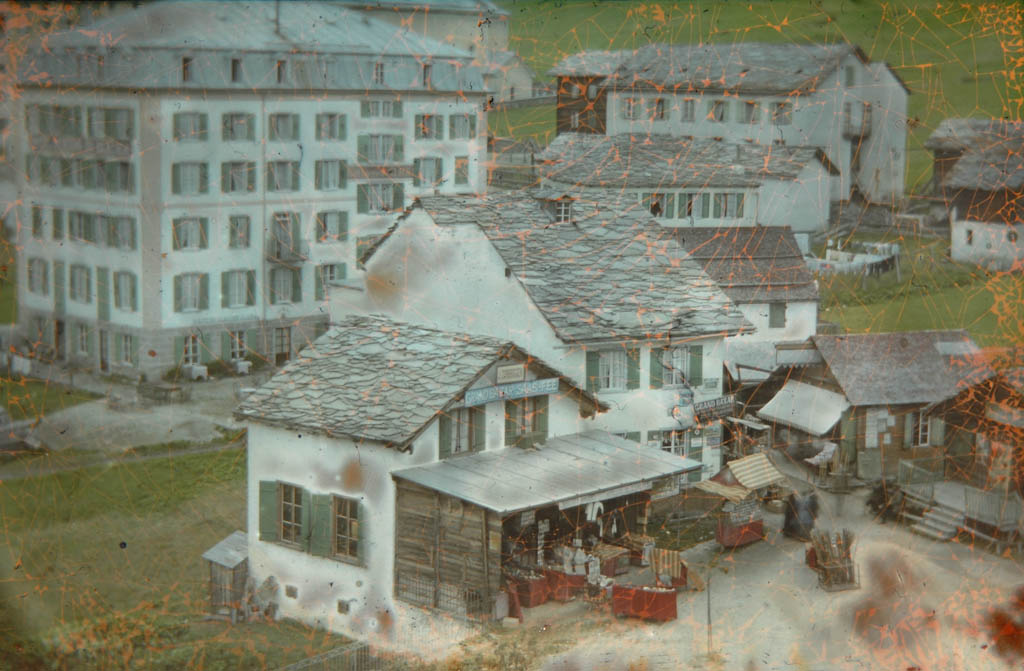
Saas-Fee by Lippmann

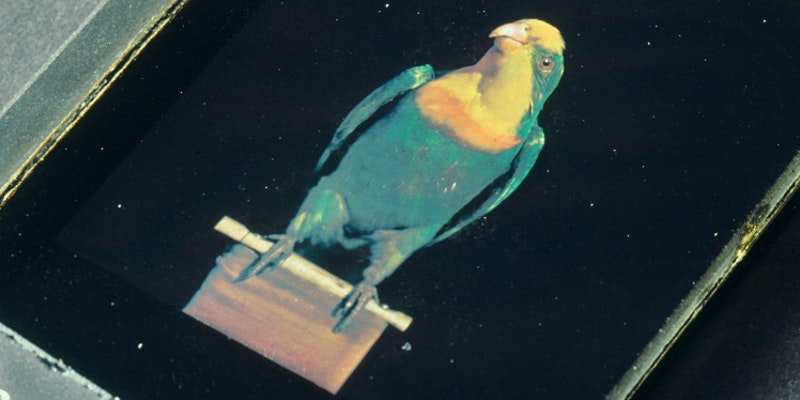
An 1899 interferential photograph of a stuffed parrot made by Richard Neuhauss

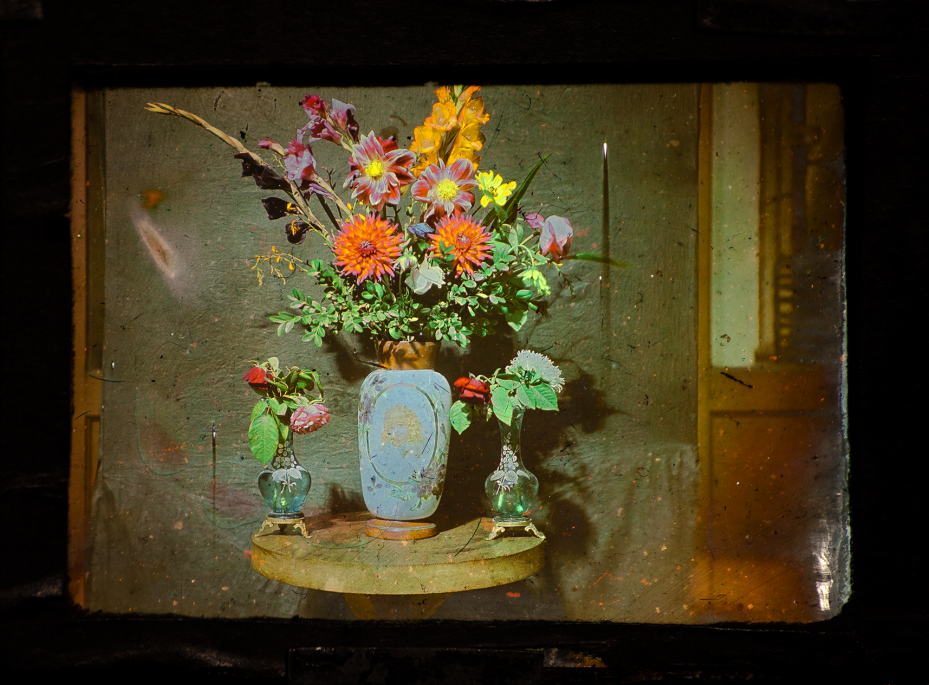
A 1906 interferential photograph by Auguste Ponsot, Lippmann's student and colleague

== Other sources of Lippmann plates ==
- The Kodak Spectroscopic Plate Type 649-F is specified with a resolving power of 2000 lines/mm.
- A diffusion method for making silver bromide based holographic recording material was published.

== Durable data storage utility ==
Because the photographs are so durable, researchers have reworked Lippmann plates for use in archival data storage to replace hard drives. Work began on the project after they were made aware data storage on the International Space Station (ISS) requires daily maintenance because it can be damaged by cosmic rays and they recalled that silver halide would not be significantly affected by astroparticles (or even electromagnetic pulses from nuclear explosions). 150 standing-wave storage samples placed on the ISS during 2019 showed no signs of data degradation after exposure to cosmic rays for nine months.

== See also ==
- Photochromy
- Holography
