= Photochromy =

Photochromy is the art or process of reproducing colors by photography.^{[Note]} Photochromy is not to be confused with photochromism (photochromics), a reversible color change induced by light energy (previously termed "phototropy"). Furthermore, a so-called photochrom–a black-and-white photograph colored by hand using an 1880s method–is not the result of the photochromy process (although the more specific and later 1890s method of Lippmann color photography to create what was sometimes termed a "direct photochrome" or "Lippmann photochrome" is such a result).

== History ==
- Colored images by direct exposure from nature using a Lippmann plate
- Color printing method by the bleach-out process. See Utocolor and Cibachrome

== See also ==
- Color photography

== Notes ==
In the original publication in 1891, Lippmann reports on photochromy in which he describes his famous method of photography in colors, the so-called "interference" method, based on the action of stationary waves.
