= Jean-Baptiste Fresez =

Luxembourgish painter

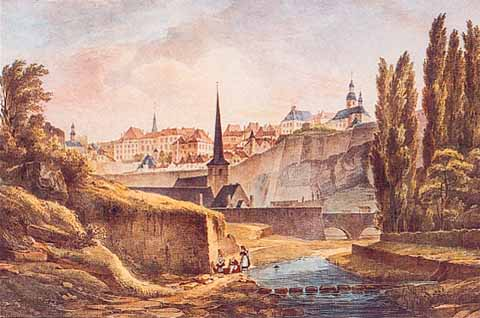
Jean-Baptiste Fresez: Luxembourg from the Alzette River (c. 1828)

Jean-Baptiste Fresez (1800–1867) was Luxembourg's most important 19th-century painter. He is remembered above all for his almost photographic images of the City of Luxembourg.

== Early life ==
Born in Longwy on 10 July 1800, Fresez came to Luxembourg City with his parents in 1802 when his father started to work at the Sept-Fontaines porcelain factory in the Rollingergrund. He attended the Luxembourg Drawing School where he was awarded the first prize when he was just 14, before continuing his art studies at the Royal Academy in Brussels. In 1848, Fresez acquired Luxembourg nationality.

== Career ==
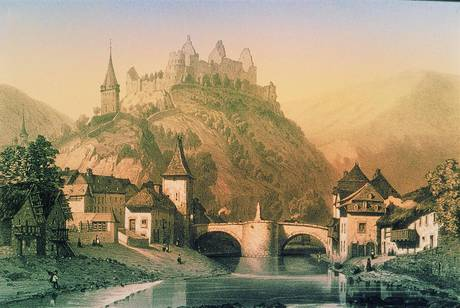
Jean-Baptiste Fresez: Vianden near the Bridge (c. 1857)

After graduating, he worked as an engraver and painter at the Villeroy and Boch porcelain factory in Mettlach on the River Saar. There he was also charged with giving art lessons to François Boch's children. When his father died in 1817, he returned to Luxembourg where he obtained employment in an architect's office. This allowed him to save up for his education in painting and sculpture at the Royal Academy in Brussels where he received a diploma allowing him to become an art teacher. From 1824, he taught first at the Luxembourg Drawing School, then at the prestigious Athénée. Among his most notable students were the painter and photographer Pierre Brandebourg and the illustrator Michel Engels. He spent all his holidays in Antwerp, studying the grand masters leading in 1826 to a diploma from the Royal Academy of Fine Arts. At the Athénée he developed an innovative method of art teaching which, welcomed by the school, became a compulsory course for most of the students.

Fresez published views of Luxembourg City, helped Nicolas Liez with his album and, in 1857, published his own Album pittoresque du Grand-Duché dedicated to Prince Henry of the Netherlands. The album contains a collected of lithographs based on 30 of his finest drawings, all considered to be of great documentary value. As a result, Fresez became a member of the Grand-Ducal Archeological Society (Société archéologique du Grand-Duché) and of the Brussels Institute of Fine Arts (Institut des Beaux-Arts de Bruxelles). He died on 31 March 1867 in Luxembourg City.

== Artwork ==
Fresez not only produced fine landscapes but also portraits clearly depicting not just lively facial features but also the figure's clothing including, for example, the transparency of the lace. They represent mainly members of the grand-ducal family and other notable local figures. In 1841, he presented a series of watercolour portraits to King William II who was visiting Luxembourg. It was so highly appreciated that the king asked for a copy for his wife. His landscapes, which he began to publish as early as 1826, were also of considerable artistic merit. A similar publication followed in 1833 and in 1855, he published his famous Album pittoresque du Grand-Duché de Luxembourg. The landscapes are extremely detailed, many of them depicting Luxembourg's most beautiful scenes which can usually still be easily identified today. As a result, the works are of great documentary value, especially those of the fortress of Luxembourg before it was dismantled.

== Gallery ==
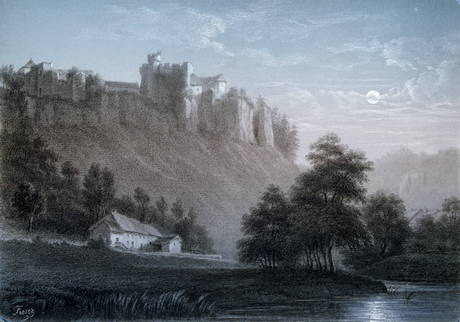
Jean-Baptiste Fresez: Ruins of Ansembourg Castle

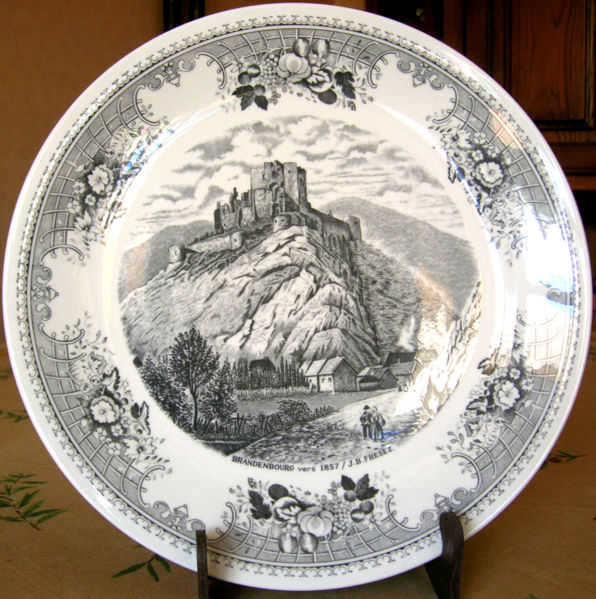
Plate with drawing of Brandenbourg by Fresez

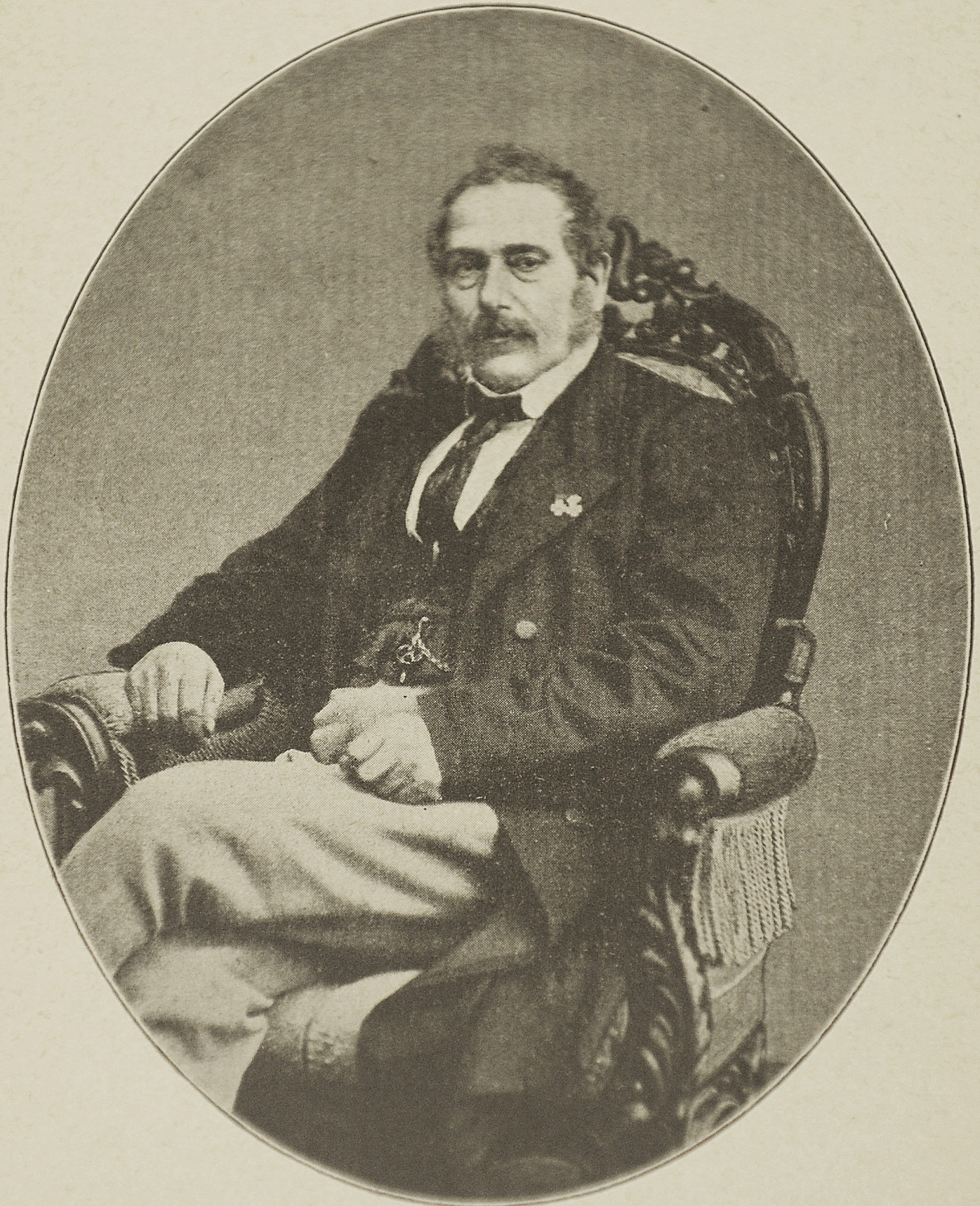
Historic photograph of Jean-Baptiste Fresez

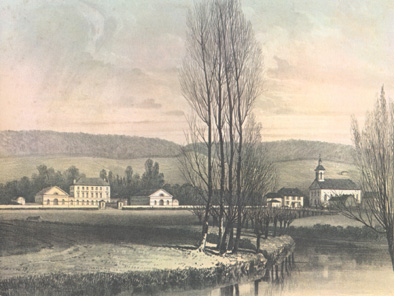
Jean-Baptiste Fresez: Walferdange

== Bibliography ==
- Jean-Baptiste Fresez: "Album pittoresque du Grand-Duché de Luxembourg", Reprint of the 1857 edition, Editions Kutter, 1968, 66 pp.
- P. Blanc: "J.-B Fresez, portraitiste", Annuaire de la Société des amis des musées, 1928
- Gilles Genot: "Der Familiennachlass von Jean-Baptiste Fresez (1800–1867)", ons stad, no. 124 (2021), pp. 52–55
- M. Noppeney: "Fresez, paysagiste et son époque", Linden & Hansen, 1932
- J. Mersch: "Vues anciennes 1598-1825", Editions P. Bruck, Luxembourg, 1977
- A. Namur: "Notices sur feu J.-B. Fresez", Imprimerie V. Buck, 1867
