= Simone Decker =

Luxembourgish artist

Simone Decker (born 1968) is a Luxembourgish artist who works mainly with photography and installations. In 1999, her photographic series Chewing and folding in Venice depicting huge chewing gum sculptures in the streets of Venice, was one of Luxembourg's contributions to the 48th Venice Biennale. Her sculptural works have included the exhibit Ghosts (2004) which consisted of seven yellow figures on the roof of the Casino Luxembourg art gallery.

== Biography ==
Born in Esch-sur-Alzette on 9 April 1968, Simone Decker completed her school education in Luxembourg before studying at the École des Arts Décoratifs in Strasbourg from 1988. She then earned a scholarship to study for a short period at the Städelschule in Frankfurt until February 1993. After a study trip to Paris, in October 1995 she graduated in plastic art from the Université des Sciences Humaines, Strasbourg.

From 1995 until 2008, under a series of scholarships, she worked in Frankfurt, New Delhi, Paris and New York City. She then taught at the Academy of Fine Arts, Nuremberg, covering both art and public space and artistic design, until May 2015.

Decker is known in Luxembourg for her exhibitions at the Casino Luxembourg in 1998 and 2004 and for her contribution to the Venice Biennale in 1999, consisting of 15 colour photographs depicting chewing gum sculptures in the streets of Venice. Many of her works are inspired by the place in which they are created, often in an architectural context. Decker seeks to provide the spectator with a new perception of the spaces she addresses. In 2002, her Chewing in Venice series was acquired by Mudam, Luxembourg's modern art museum.
