= Karla Suárez =

Cuban writer (born 1969)

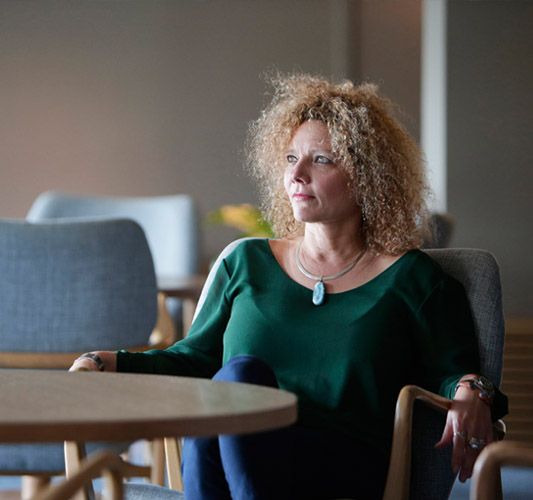
Cuban writer Karla Suárez

Karla Suárez (born October 28, 1969) is a Cuban writer.

== Biography ==
Suárez was born on October 28, 1969, in Havana, Cuba. She studied electronic engineering while remaining interested in literature.

Her career as a writer began with the publication of some of her short stories in several anthologies and magazines. The tale Aniversario (Anniversary) was adapted for the stage in 1996. Her first collection, Espuma (Foam) was published three years later, and two of its short stories were made into TV scripts for Cuban television.

Her debut novel Silencios (Silences) won the Lengua de Trapo Prize in 1999 and has been translated into several languages. In 2010, this novel was adapted for the stage in France and, in 2013, the University choral ensemble of Montpellier, Ecume, created "Cubana soy", a creation for the musical theatre.

In 2003, she won the Italian award for international short stories I Colori delle Donne and in both 2006 and 2007 was a member of the jury for the International Literature (Short Stories) Award Juan Rulfo, sponsored by Radio France International in Paris.

In 2007, the Hay Festival and the organizers of the Bogotá World Book Capital selected Karla Suárez as part of the Bogotá39 for the most promising Latin American writers under the age of 39.

In 2012, her novel Habana, año cero (Havana, Year Zero) won the Prix Carbet de la Caraïbe et du Tout-Monde and the Salon du livre insulaire award.

In 2019, her short story "El pañuelo" ("The Handkerchief") won the 18th annual Julio Cortázar Award for Best Iberoamerican Story, awarded by the Cuban Book Institute, Casa de las Américas, and the National Union of Writers and Artists of Cuba.

She also wrote the stories for a books of photos collections with the Italian photographer Francesco Gattoni: Cuba les chemins du hasard; Rome, par-delà les chemins; and Grietas en las paredes with the Luxembourgish photographer Yvon Lambert.

She earned scholarships in Cuba (Razón de Ser) and France (Centre national du livre, Paris) Maison des Ecrivains Etrangers et Traducteurs, Saint-Nazaire; Agence Régionale pour l'Écrit et le Livre en Aquitanie, Bordeaux; and Clermont Communauté, Clermont-Ferrand.

In 1999, she moved to Rome and then in 2004 to Paris. She has lived in Lisbon since 2010. She coordinates the Reading Club of Lisbon at El Instituto Cervantes and she is also Professor of Creative Writing at the Escuela de Escritores in Madrid.

== Bibliography ==
=== Novels ===
- 1999: Silencios (t: Silence). Spain, Lengua de Trapo, ISBN 84-89618-39-9 / RBA, 2002 / Punto de Lectura, 2008, ISBN 978-84-663-2233-1. Cuba, Letras Cubanas, 2008. (Premio Lengua de Trapo, 1999).

- 2005: La viajera (t: The Traveller). Spain, Roca Editorial, ISBN 84-96284-82-4.

- 2011: Habana año cero. Cuba, Editorial UNION, ISBN 978-959-308-204-4. (Premio Carbet del Caribe, 2012 and Gran Premio del Libro Insular, 2012. Francia)

- 2017: El hijo del héroe. Spain, Editorial COMBA ISBN 978-84-947203-3-8.
- 2021: Havana Year Zero. Charco Press (English translation by Christina MacSweeney) ISBN 9781913867003

=== Stories ===
- 1999: Espuma (Foam). Cuba, Letras Cubanas, ISBN 959-10-0485-0. Colombia, Norma, 2001, ISBN 958-04-7014-6.

- 2001: Carroza para actores (A Carriage for Actors). Colombia, Norma, ISBN 958-04-6278-X.

- 2007: Grietas en las paredes (Photos: Yvon Lambert) (Cracks in the Walls). Belgium, Husson, ISBN 978-2-916249-22-3.

=== Book travel ===
- 2007: Cuba les chemins du hasard (Photos: Francesco Gattoni) (Cuba, The Paths of Chance). France, Le bec en l'air, ISBN 978-2-916073-26-2.

- 2014: Rome, par-delà les chemins (Photos: Francesco Gattoni). France, Editorial Le bec en l'air, ISBN 978-2-36744-061-3

== Sources ==
- Editorial Lengua de Trapo
- Roca editorial
- Editions Métailié
