= Susanna van Tonder =

Luxembourgish activist and blogger

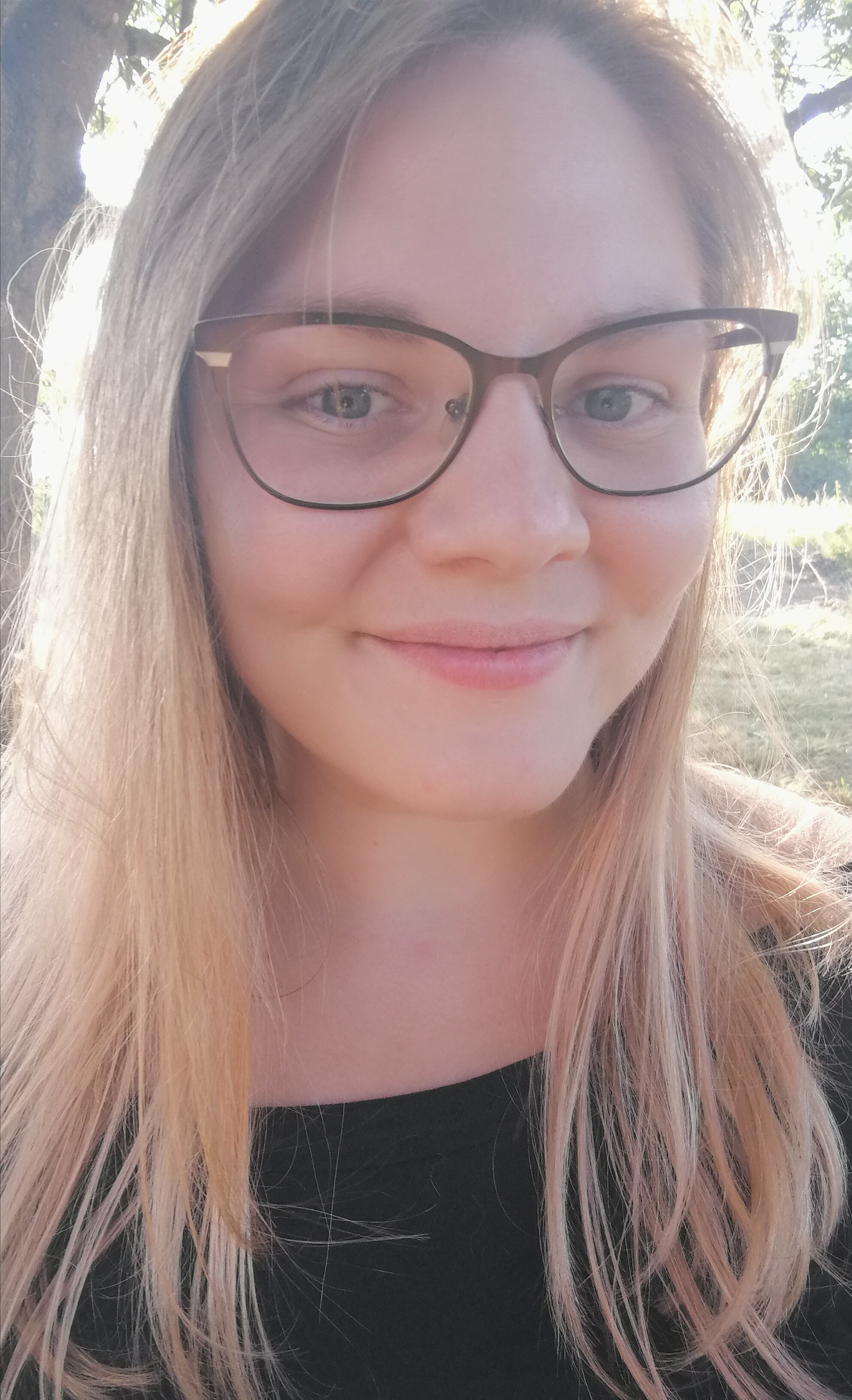
- Education: Combined Social Sciences (The Open University)
- Known for: Disability Rights Activism & Patient Advocacy
- Term: 2019–present
- Board member of: Multiple Sclérose Lëtzebuerg

Susanna van Tonder is a Luxembourgish disability rights activist, patient advocate and blogger.

Van Tonder's first obvious symptoms of multiple sclerosis caused her to have a Grand Mal seizure in 2015. In 2016, exactly a year later, she was diagnosed with multiple sclerosis. This experience of being diagnosed with an incurable disease in her early adult years led van Tonder to work on inclusion and wider understanding of the needs for people with disabilities and patients affected by chronic conditions.

After attending an event in 2017 organised by the European Multiple Sclerosis Platform (EMSP) and Shift.ms for Young People affected by Multiple Sclerosis she started being involved in the patient community. In 2017, she joined Shift.ms' volunteer team called 'The Energy'. In 2018, she became a member of the board of the non-profit association Multiple Sclérose Lëtzebuerg and a member of the EMSP's Young People's network. As the youngest board member of Multiple Sclérose Lëtzebuerg, youth engagement and reducing isolation are her main focus areas.

In early 2019 she joined the Higher Council for People with Disabilities (CSPH) in Luxembourg to complete Tilly Metz term on behalf of Multiple Sclérose Lëtzebuerg and those affected by multiple sclerosis.

In 2019, van Tonder created the M.S Brainy Campaign to "raise awareness of multiple sclerosis, and the diversity of those affected by MS. The campaign features the stories, and faces of those living with MS and what it may mean to live with MS. It operates under the hashtag #MoreThanBrain #MultipleSclerosis. Van Tonder maintains a blog describing her journey as a patient advocate.

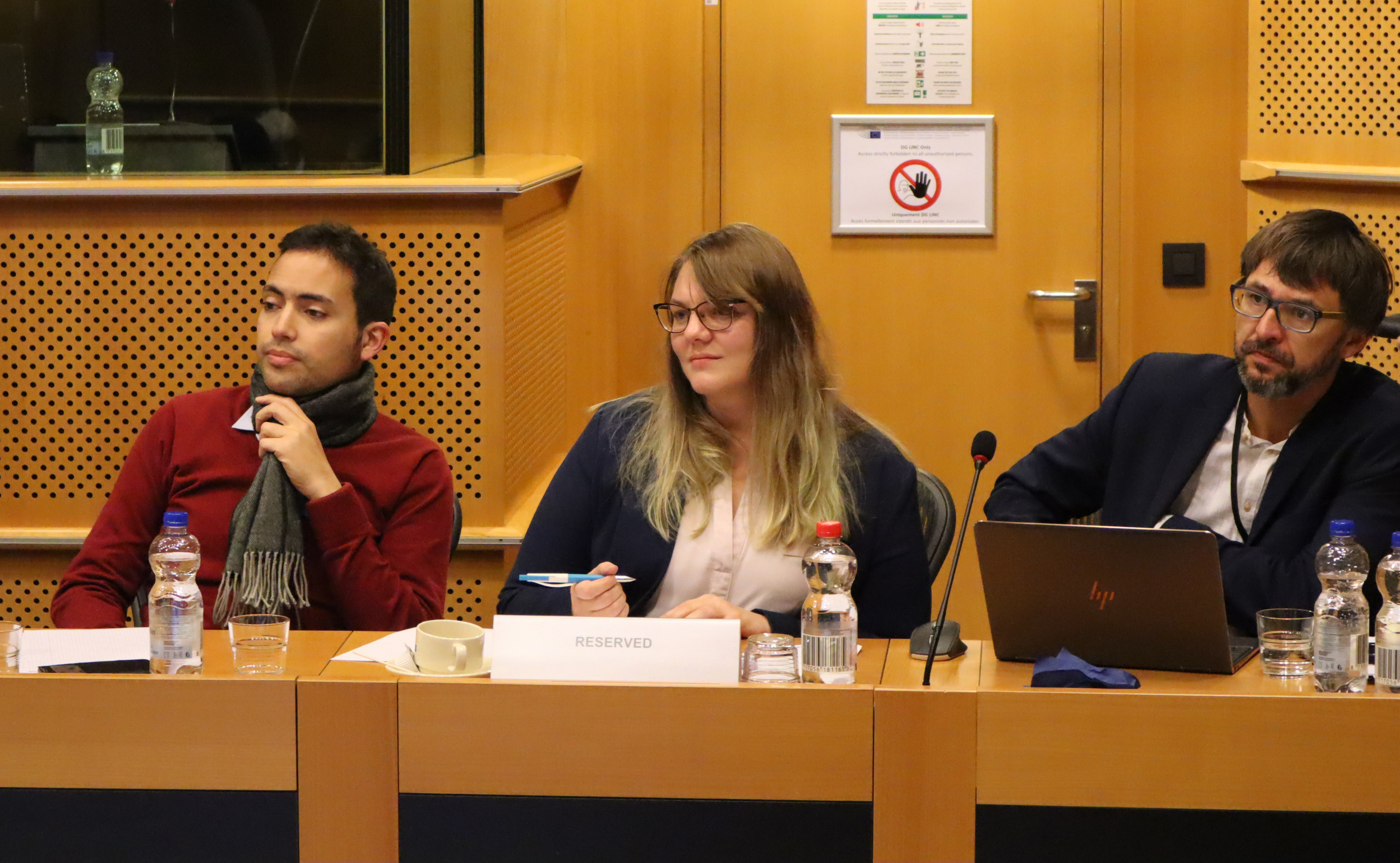
Susanna van Tonder at the Brain, Mind and Pain Meeting at the European Parliament in November 2018.

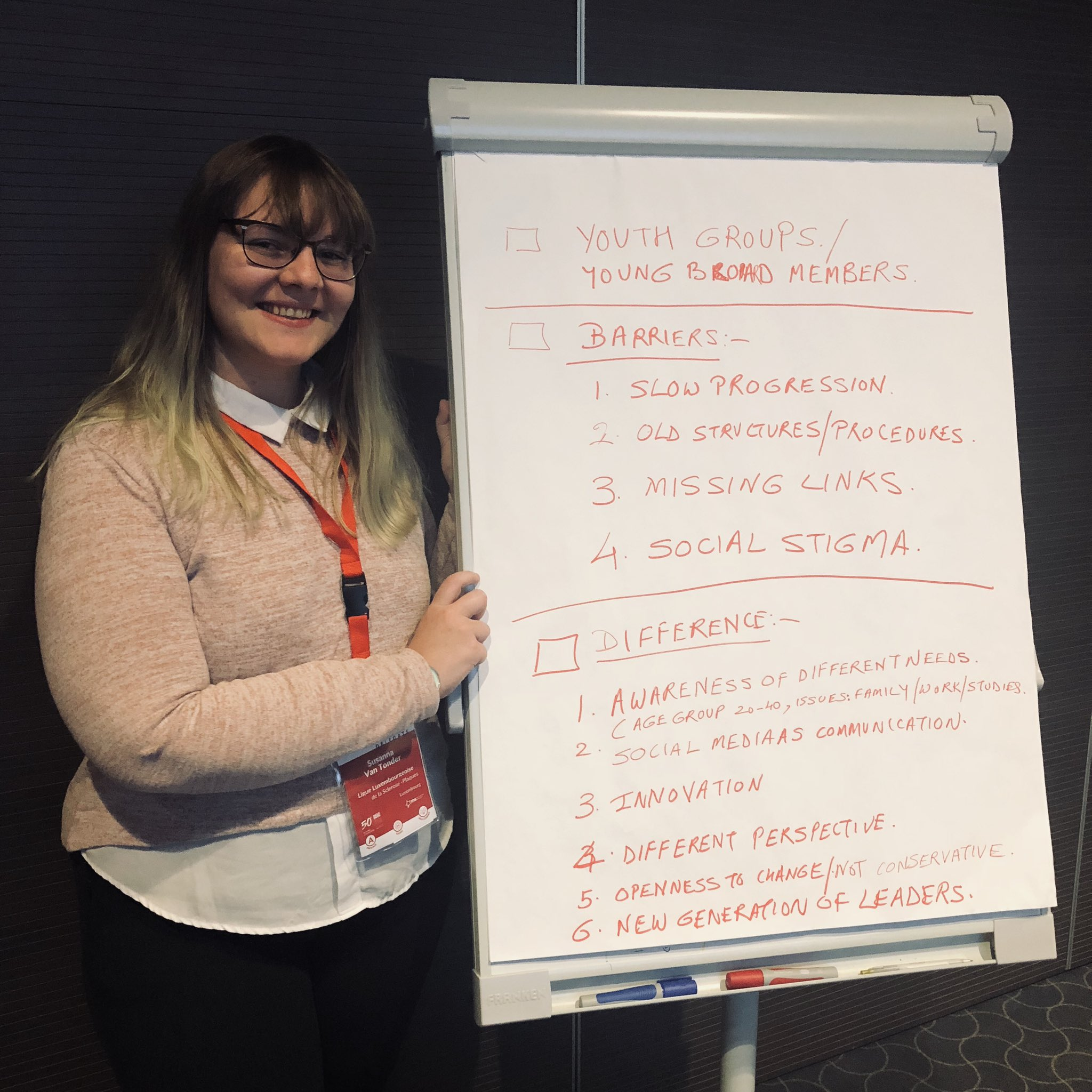
Susanna van Tonder presenting group findings at MSIF World Conference Young People's Workshop

== Recognition ==
For her work in the multiple sclerosis field, van Tonder won the youth award De Jugendpräis Wooltz 2019 in the category 'particular achievement'.
