= National Audiovisual Centre =

Coordinates: 49.474710°N 6.082883°E

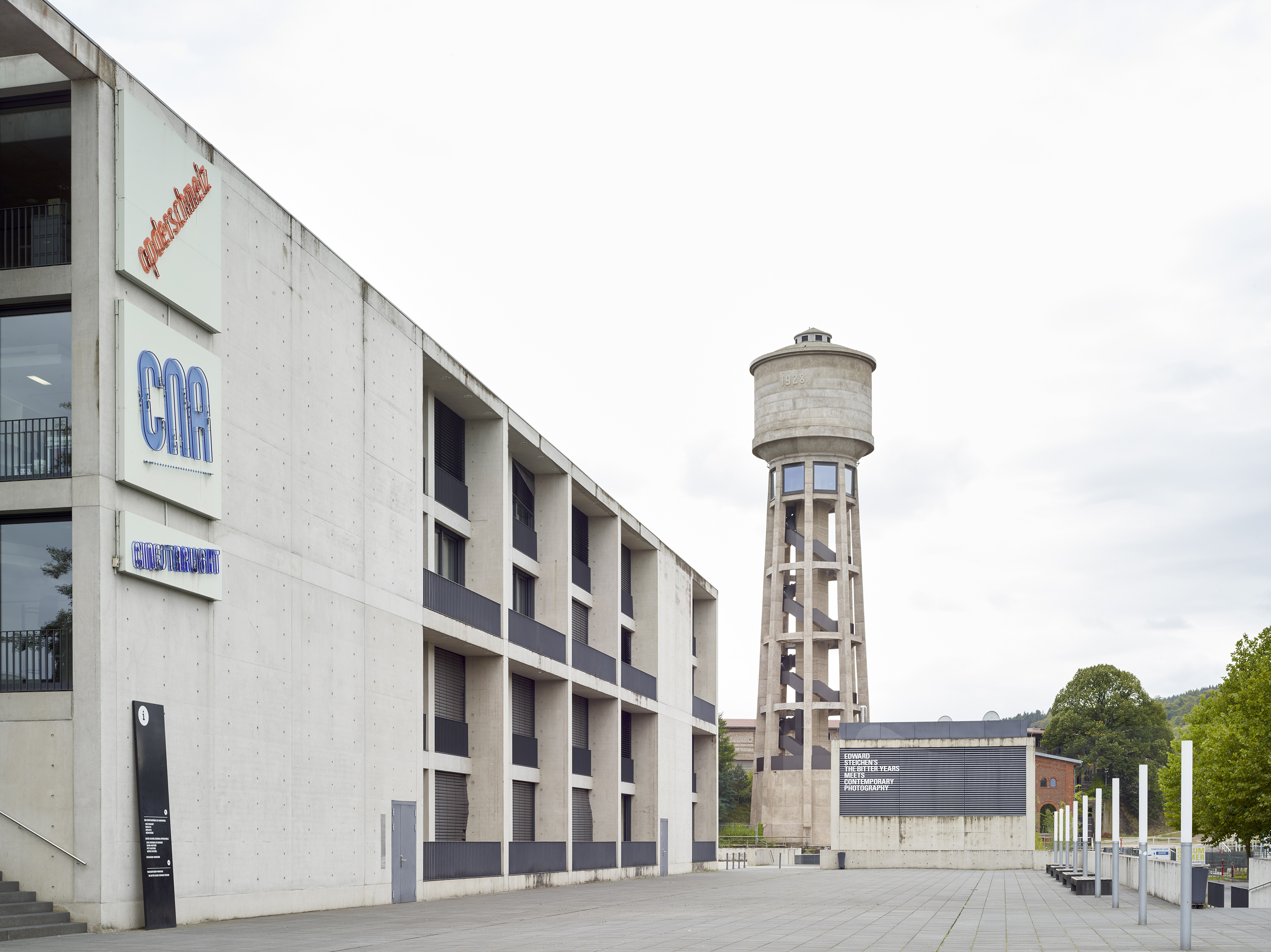
National Audiovisual Centre building

The National Audiovisual Centre (French: Centre national de l'audiovisuel or CNA) was created in 1989 and is based in Dudelange, Luxembourg. Its function is to safeguard and promote Luxembourgish audiovisual art. More specifically, it is concerned with photographic, audio and film work created by Luxembourgers or in Luxembourg. The centre also serves as a general exhibition and performance venue.

== Examples of works ==
- Ray Tostevin's film "Léif Lëtzebuerger";
- Marianne Majerus's photographs.
