= Photothèque (Luxembourg) =

Photography gallery in Luxembourg City

Coordinates: 49°35′07″N 06°06′51″E

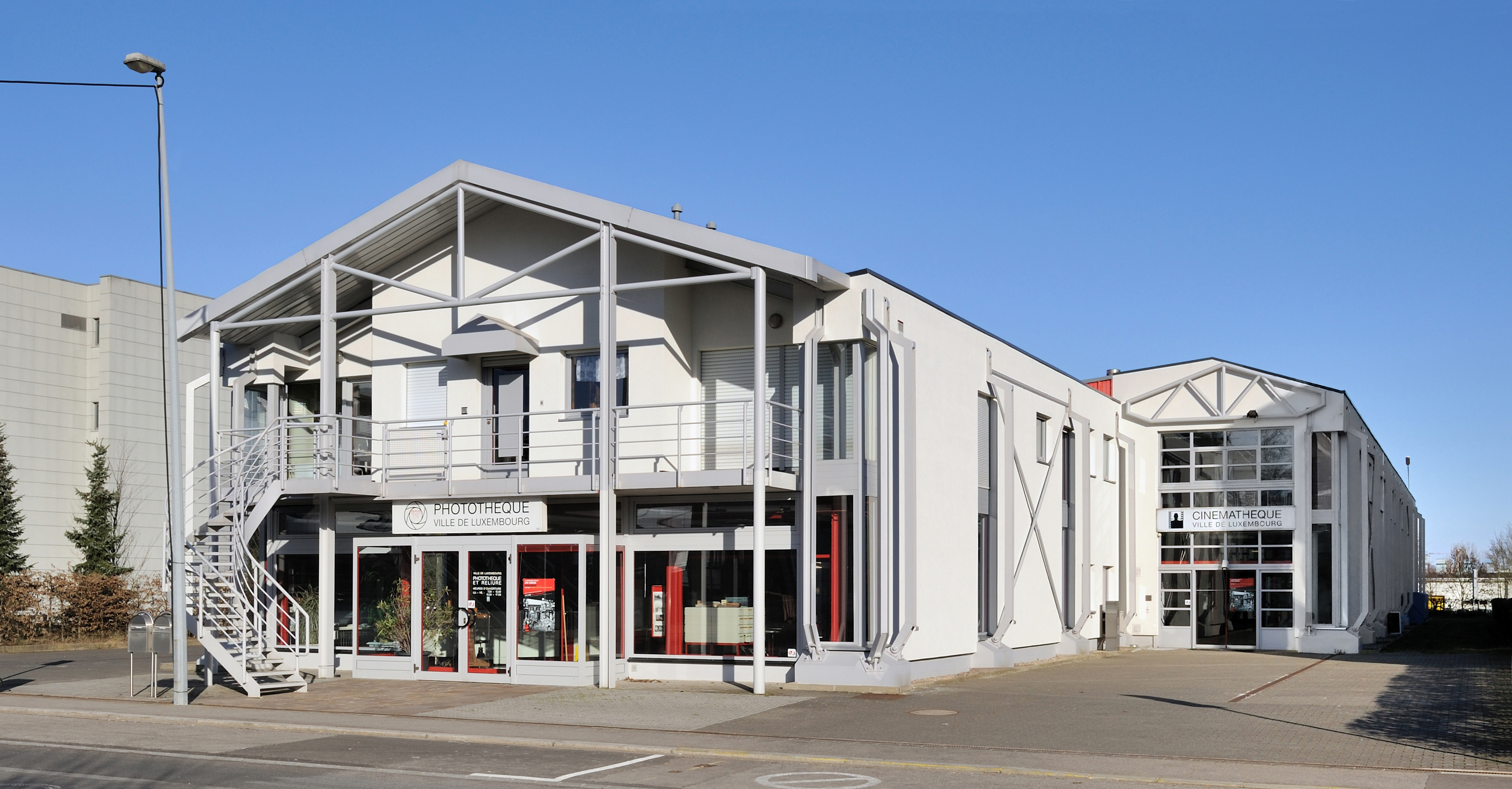
Photothèque de la Ville de Luxembourg in the Cloche d'Or district (2011).

The Photothèque (officially Photothèque de la Ville de Luxembourg) in Luxembourg City in the Grand Duchy of Luxembourg houses several large collections of photographs of the city taken between 1855 and today. Open to the public, it is modelled on the photothèque at the Centre Georges Pompidou in Paris and has adopted the same classification system.

== History ==
The Photothèque was opened in 1984 in order to display photographic collections previously stored in the municipal archives. Its objective was to provide a permanent showcase for photographs documenting the look of the city over the various periods of its urban development. Its design, equipment and method of operation were based on experience in France, specifically from Documentation française and the photothèque at the Centre Georges Pompidou in Paris. After operating for a period as part of the city's binding department at 63, rue du Fort Neipperg, in 1992 the increasingly popular Photothèque moved into specially built premises at the Cloche d'Or in the south of Luxembourg City.

The holdings acquired in 1985 are still considered the most important. They consist of Bernard Wolff's collection with historic views taken by various photographers during the final period of Luxembourg's fortifications, Batty Fischer's collection of photographs documenting the city's development in the 19th and 20th centuries, and a series of originals taken by Luxembourg-born photographer Edward Steichen.

== Location ==
Situated at 10, rue Eugène Ruppert, in the Cloche d'Or district of Luxembourg City, the Photothèque is open to the public on weekdays.

== Collections ==
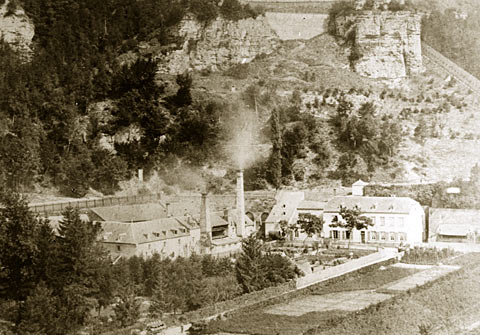
Pierre Brandebourg: The brewery in Clausen, Luxembourg (1865). One of the Photothèque's oldest photographs

The holdings comprise some four million photographs taken between 1855 and the present day. They have been built up over the years through donations and bequests as well as by works specifically funded by the city. Most of the archives are on the ground floor while the first floor is occupied by the city's binding service as well as by the remaining archives.

Among the most important collections are those of Batty Fischer (some 10,000 documents showing the look of the city between 1890 and 1958); Théo Mey (some 400,000 photographs of the Grand Duchy in the 1950s and 1960s); the archives of Edouard Kutter and his son of the same name (comprising some 200,000 photographs of the Grand Ducal family and of news items from 1950 to 1980); Tony Krier (400,000 images of Luxembourg City, the Grand Duchy and events from 1939 to 1967); as well as a collection of some 500,000 negatives from Camille and Pol Aschman covering news items from 1935 to 1988.

In 1992, Remo Raffaelli — who had worked together with Jacques Bohler, a photographer with Républicain Lorrain and Tageblatt — donated 40,000 negatives related to newspaper articles on sport and culture between 1976 and 1988. In 1994, Pierre Bertogne enriched the holdings with a further 16,000 images taken during the 1930s and 1940s which include photographs of Luxembourg's occupation during the Second World War and its subsequent liberation.

Martine Theisen, who has been at the Photothèque since 1989 and has held the post of director since 1998, explains that most people come to see the older pictures which remind them of the city as it was when they were children. Efforts are still being made to build up the collection in order to ensure wider coverage of the city and its history. Among the ten people working at the Photothèque, there is also a photographer who is regularly assigned to keep abreast of changes in the city's development. In relation to digitization, Ms Theisen explains that it has not yet been possible to find a firm capable of handling such a large assignment under suitable conditions. Efforts will however continue in this direction in the future.

== Classification ==
Each photograph is initially registered with a numerical code showing the year of acquisition, the number of the album where it is held and its sequential number in the acquisition records. In addition, catalogue cards give a detailed description of the work, its origin and author, the date when the photograph was taken, as well as information about the negative and applicable copyright. These details are kept together with the corresponding photograph in metal-backed albums, each containing between 25 and 30 documents. The negatives are stored separately in chronological order with codes identifying the album in question. Works of special historical value are removed from the collection for safekeeping and replaced with copies. The alphabetical index is based on pertinent items from the description of the photograph.

== Publications and copying service ==
Since 2000, four books in the series "Les trésors de la photothèque" have been published. Each volume presents the work of one of the Photothèque's best represented photographers. Those published to date cover Pol Aschman (photojournalism from 1935 to 1988), Marcel Schroeder (local history up to 1999), Théo Mey (photojournalism from 1950 to 1980), Tony Krier (reportages from 1939 to 1972). All are available at the Photothèque. Visitors are also able to purchase paper copies of the archived photographs, usually for less than €10 per copy for standard size. Owing to copyright regulations, digital copies are not available.

== See also ==
- Photography in Luxembourg
