= Thérèse Glaesener-Hartmann =

Luxembourgish painter

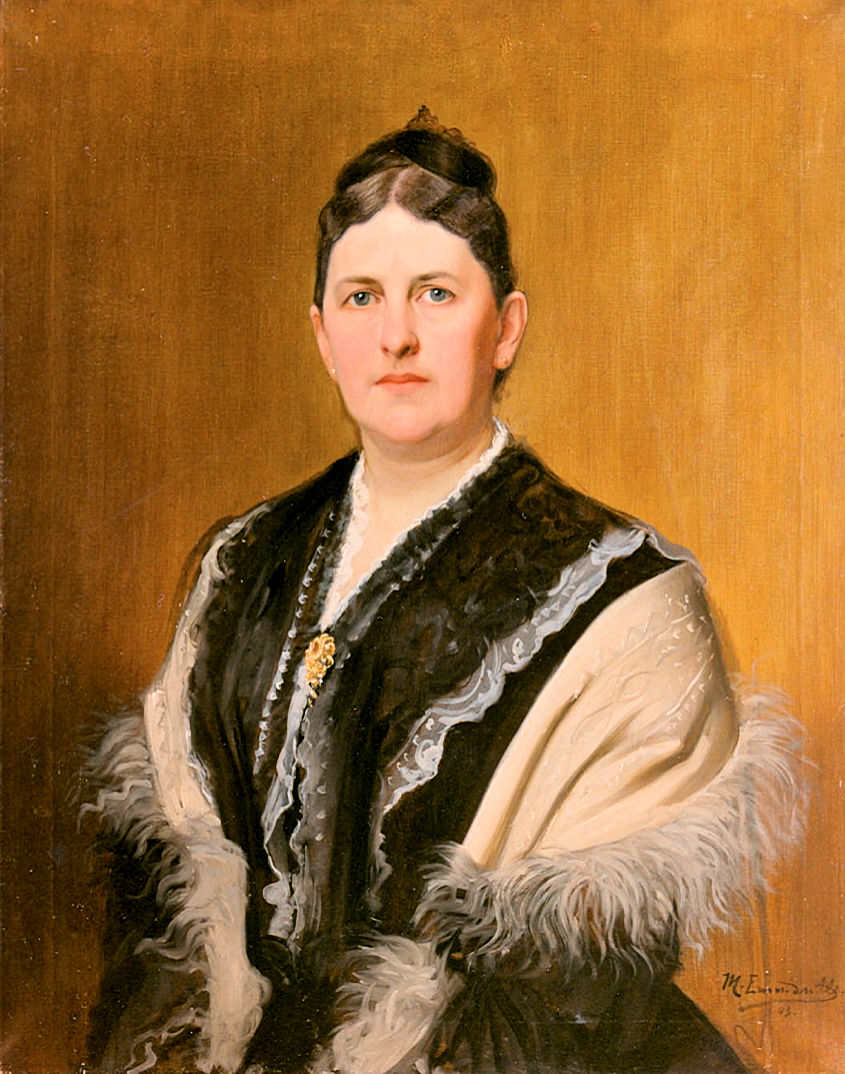
Thérèse Glaesener-Hartmann painted by Michael Emonds-Alt

Marie-Thérèse Glaesener-Hartmann (1858–1923) was a Luxembourgish painter. She is remembered for painting the portraits of prominent figures of the times, including Prime Minister Paul Eyschen (1841–1915) and Mayor of Luxembourg City Alphonse Munchen (1850–1917). She exhibited at the Cercle artistique from 1894 to 1912.

== Biography ==
Born on 18 April 1858 in Luxembourg City, Marie-Thérèse Hartmann was the daughter of the architect Antoine Hartmann (1817–1891). Encouraged by her father who introduced her to painting, she became one of the first women from Luxembourg to study abroad. In 1877, when she was only 19, she spent a year in Düsseldorf studying privately under Gustav Süs. She then continued her studies in Munich for a further two years under Sándor Liezen-Mayer. Finally, she spent two years in Paris where she was the pupil of Emile Carolus-Duran and Jean-Jacques Henner who had opened a school for female artists. It was unusual for a young woman from Luxembourg to receive such expert training in art at the time and to spend so many years abroad. The Luxembourg academy did not admit women until the end of the 19th century which possibly explains why her Portrait de S.A.R. Madame la Princesse Henri des Pays-Bas (1879) was not considered worthy of inclusion in Luxembourg City's collection.

Shortly after returning from Paris, she married the jurist and state councillor Mathias Glaesener (1858–1924). Even after her daughter was born in 1886, she continued to paint. While still a student she began to exhibit in Luxembourg at the Galerie Louis Segers. Her works, particularly her portraits of men, were considered to be of a high quality. From 1894 to 1912, she exhibited at the Cercle artistique.

Thérèse Glaesener-Hartman died in Luxembourg City on 19 February 1923. A street in the city bears her name. Some of her works can be seen in Luxembourg's National Museum of History and Art and in the Luxembourg City History Museum.

== Gallery ==
The following oil paintings are examples of the work of Glaesener-Hartmann:

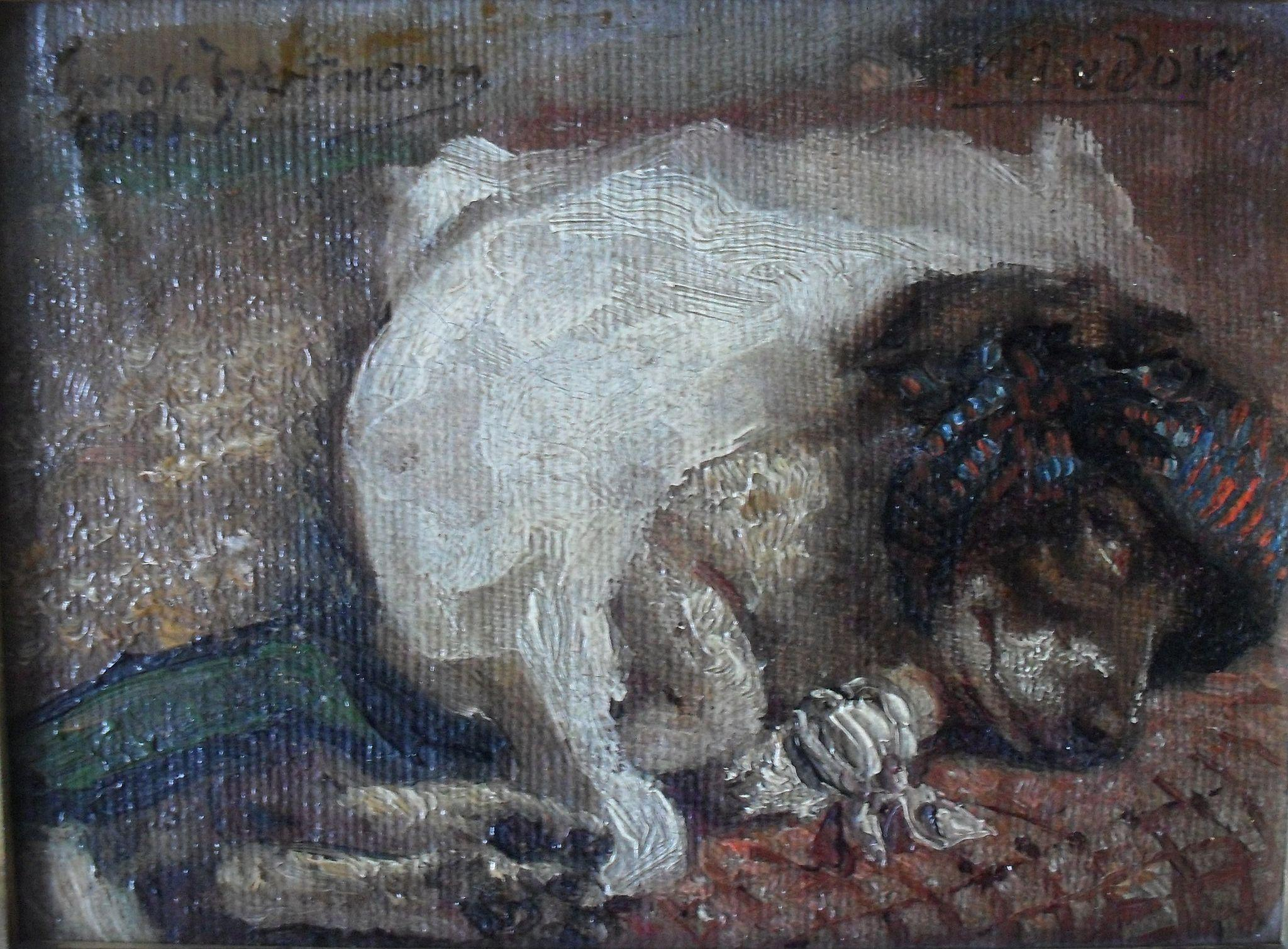
Médor (1886)

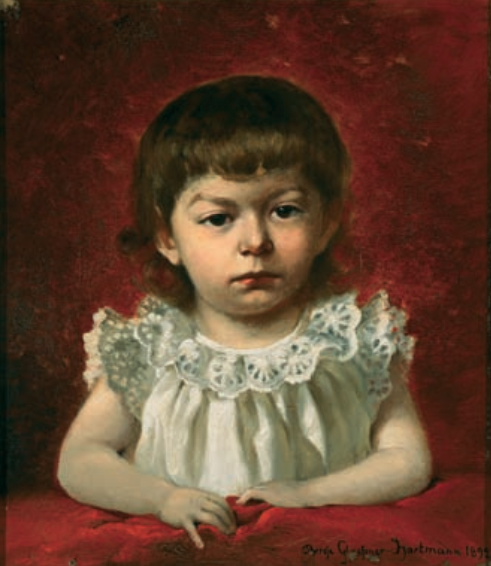
Jules Ulveling (1892)

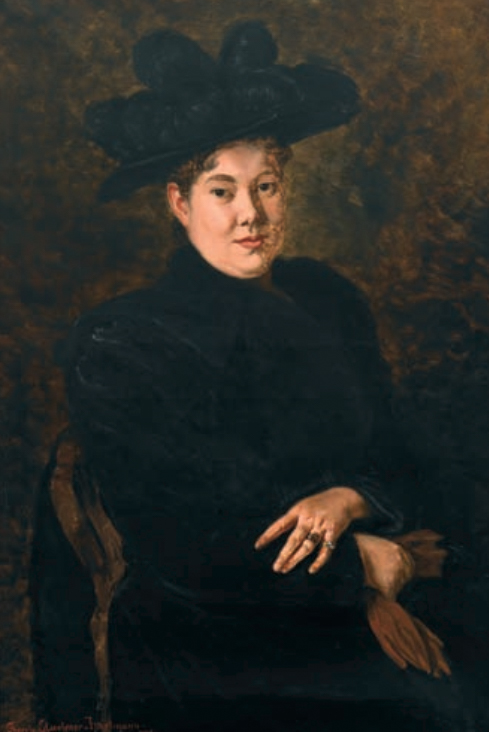
Paule Ulveling (1895)

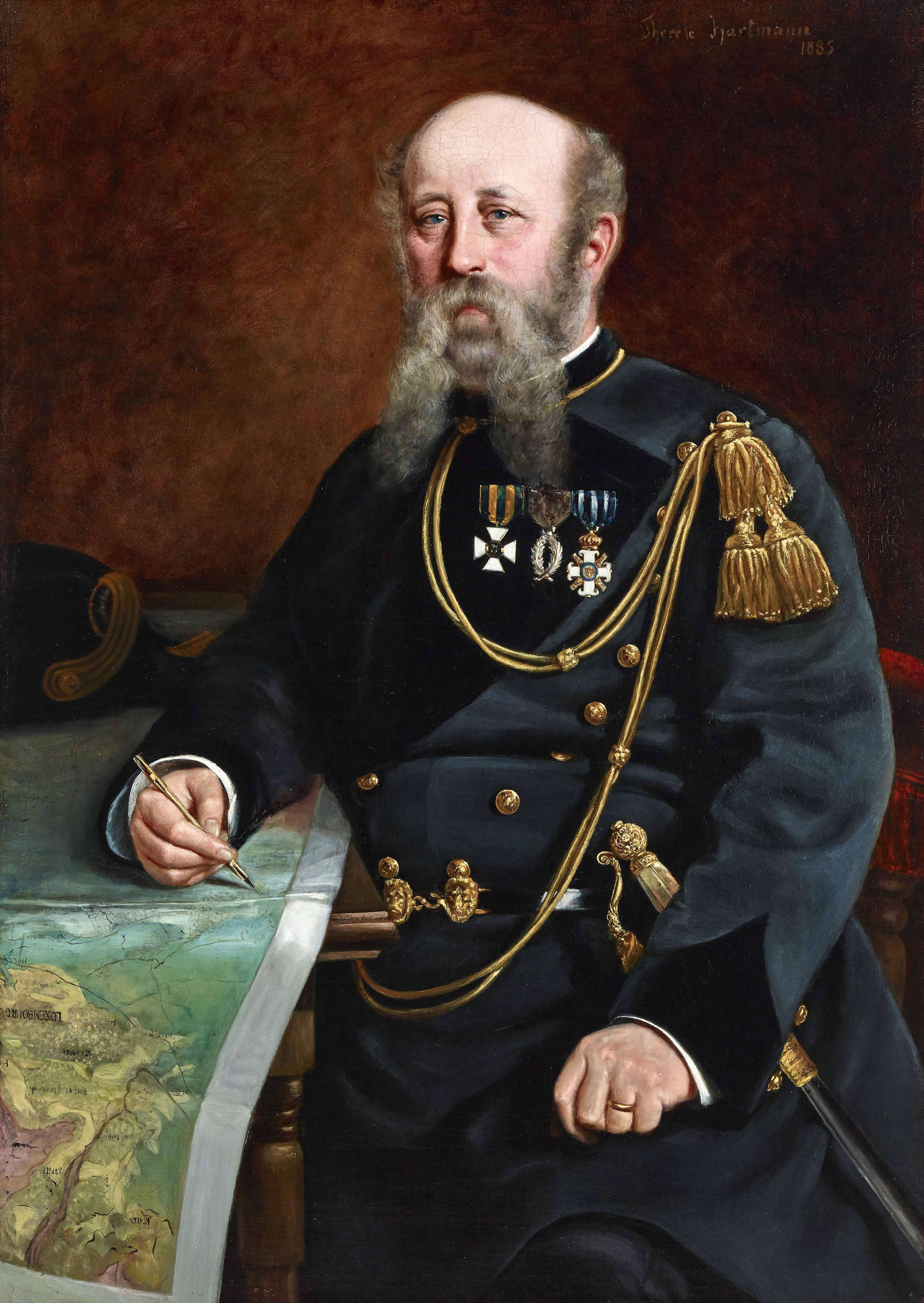
The geologist Pierre Mathias Siegen (1896)

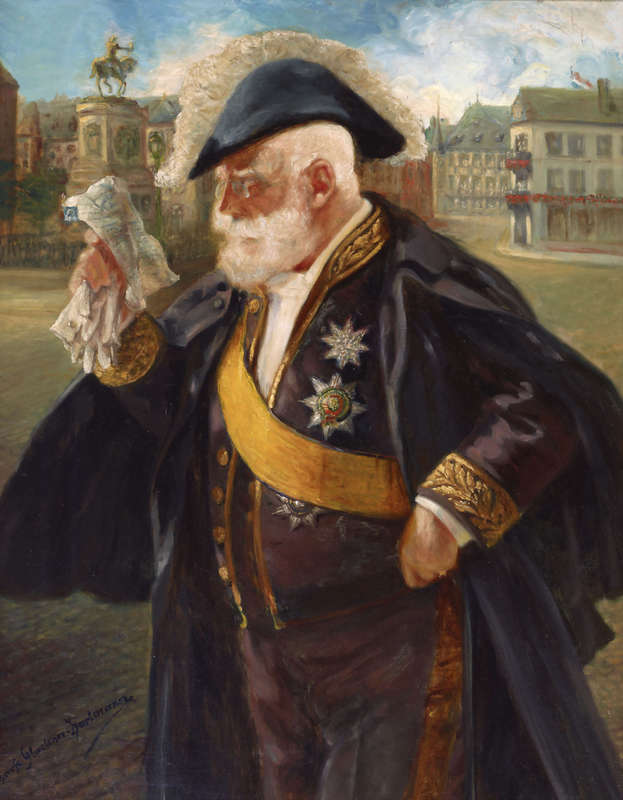
Prime Minister Paul Eyschen (not dated)

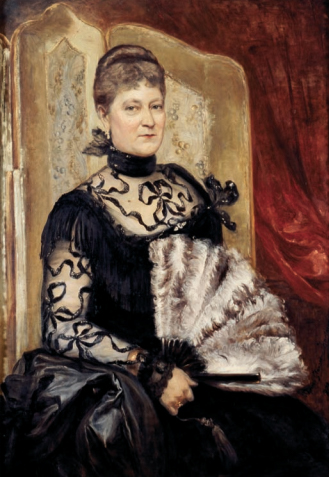
Madame Salentiny (1902)

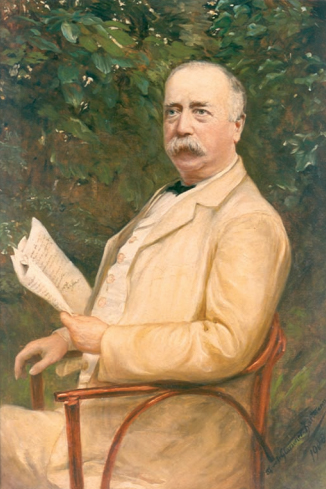
Dr J.-P. Glaesener (1908)
