= Katell Guillou =

French restaurateur

Katell Guillou (born 1972) is a French restaurateur who runs two one-star Michelin restaurants in Schouweiler, Luxembourg: Toit pour Toi and Guillou Campagne.

== Biography ==
Born on 15 December 1972 in Bastogne, Belgium, Katell Guillou is the daughter of Lysiane and Pierrick Guillou who have operated Michelin-starred restaurants in Luxembourg since the 1970s. They first opened the Saint Michel in Luxembourg City in 1972 and then the La Table des Guilloux in Schouweiler in 1993 which went on to earn two Michelin stars. After matriculating from the Institut Pilatre des Roziers in Moulins-lès-Metz with a literary baccalauréat, Katell Guillou entered the restaurant business, managing the catering business her parents had established in the centre of Luxembourg City.

Thereafter she spent ten years working for the caterer Pascal Brasseur, adding to the knowledge of gastronomy she had already acquired from her father. In 1999, she heard from her mother that the property adjoining the Table des Guilloux was for sale. She immediately decided she could open her own restaurant there. Her father took care of the major renovation work while she completed the interior. After almost a year's work, the Toit pour Toit was opened on 31 December 1999. Six years later the restaurant was awarded a Michelin star.

Following the closure of La Table des Guilloux on her parents' retirement, Katell Guillou acquired the property, undertook substantial renovation work and opened Guillou Campagne in 2009. In 2015, the restaurant was granted a Michelin star.
