= Utocolor =

Light-sensitive paper for color photography

Utocolor or Uto paper was a light-sensitive paper for color photography manufactured by Dr. J.H. Smith of Zurich, Switzerland and available by early 1907.

== Overview ==
Improved versions appeared in later years. It used the direct bleach-out method of color reproduction first proposed by Louis Ducos du Hauron and Charles Cros in the late 1860s and based on the fact that a substance can only be affected by exposure to light if it absorbs some of that light. Unstable coloring matter is therefore bleached by light of its complementary color, which it strongly absorbs, but little affected by light of its own color, which it mostly transmits or reflects.

The Uto paper came coated with a mixture of cyan, magenta and yellow dyes which appeared nearly black. It was sensitized with a catalyst that greatly increased the susceptibility of the dyes to fading. Where the coating was exposed to red light, that light was absorbed by the cyan dye and therefore bleached it, leaving the magenta and yellow dyes, which together appeared red; yellow light was absorbed by both the cyan and magenta dyes, bleaching them to leave only the yellow; green light bleached only the magenta, leaving cyan and yellow, which appeared green; blue light bleached only the yellow dye, leaving the cyan and magenta dyes, which in combination absorbed all colors of light except blue. Less strongly colored light bleached all three dyes to differing degrees, and white light bleached all three equally, leaving only a grayish dye mixture or the bare white paper. After exposure, the catalyst was rinsed out of the coating.

In practice, an hours-long exposure to direct sunlight was required to completely bleach the dyes, making Utocolor paper useless in a camera. It was suitable only for reproducing transparent colored originals, such as stained or "art" glass, paintings on glass, and early photographic color images on glass such as Autochromes. Although rinsing out the catalyst stabilized the prints and made them much less sensitive to light, it did not actually "fix" them by removing all sensitivity, so they were unfit for prolonged open display and were best kept in the protective darkness of a closed album when not being examined.
