= Pierre Brandebourg =

Luxembourgish painter and photographer (1824–1878)

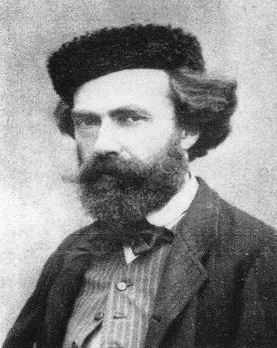
Pierre Brandebourg.

Pierre Paul Brandebourg, also Peter Brandenbourg (1824-1878) was a Luxembourgish painter and photographer. He was the first to open a photographic studio in the city of Luxembourg.

== Early life and family ==
Brandebourg's parents were Charles Brandebourg, a gardener, and Anne Lambert. After completing high school at Luxembourg's Athénée, he first studied art under the Luxembourg painter Jean-Baptiste Fresez before spending terms at the academies of Paris, Antwerp and Munich. Returning to Luxembourg, on 4 May 1850, he married Catherine Kranenwitter from Rollingergrund. Both his son Charles (Carl) (1851–1906) and his grandson Emile followed in his footsteps, working as photographers in Luxembourg.

== Career ==
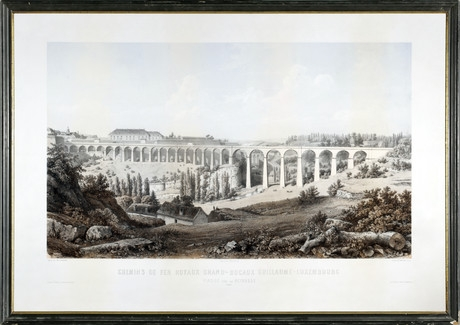
Pierre Brandebourg: Lithographic drawing of Viaduc de Luxembourg (c. 1861)

Although Brandebourg was recognized as a competent artist with his paintings of men at work and scenes of the harbour in Antwerp or the steel factories of Luxembourg, he had difficulty in making a living from art alone. He therefore turned to photography, opening Luxembourg's first photographic studio on the Fish Market. As a result of the care he took with composition and lighting, having one's portrait taken "chez Brandebourg" became increasingly popular.

Brandebourg died in 1878 at his home on Avenue Amélie in Luxembourg. Most of his paintings and photographs are still privately owned. Some can be seen in Luxembourg's Photothèque. Charles Bernhoeft took over his photographic business.
