= Marianne Majerus =

Specialist garden photographer

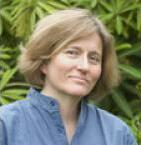
Marianne Majerus

Marianne Majerus (born 1956) is one of Europe's leading specialist garden photographers.

== Biography ==
Majerus was born in 1956 in Clervaux, Luxembourg. After finishing secondary education in Luxembourg, she took a degree in English at the University of Essex and a degree in Economics at the University of East Anglia. Her first exhibition of landscape photographs was held in 1979 at the Minories Art Gallery in Colchester. Her second, "East Coast", was sponsored by Eastern Arts and toured in 1982. Her portraits of writers, notably those of Doris Lessing, Malcolm Bradbury and Tom Sharpe, are held in the National Portrait Gallery Collection.

Having illustrated a number of studies of historical culture, as well as food and travel books, Majerus specialised in the photography of plants and gardens. Her company, Marianne Majerus Garden Images, provides garden images to the media in the United Kingdom and worldwide. Majerus is currently a member of the Royal Horticultural Society Photographic Advisory Committee and in 2013 joined The Garden Media Guild's panel of award judges. During the London 2012 Cultural Olympiad Majerus was photographed to represent her native Luxembourg in The World in London exhibition in Victoria Park and on Oxford Street.

== Works ==
Four portraits by Majerus are exhibited by the National Portrait Gallery (London): of Doris Lessing, Hugo Williams, Malcolm Bradbury and Raffaella Barker. Other works are held by the Arts Council of Great Britain and the Centre National de l'Audiovisuel in Luxembourg. Other portraits include those of J. G. Ballard, Andrew Motion, Tony Harrison and Baroness Ludford.

Her photographs appear regularly in Country Life, The Times, The Sunday Times Magazine, The Daily Telegraph, The Sunday Telegraph Magazine, House & Garden, Homes and Gardens, The Evening Standard (London), The RHS Garden Journal, The English Garden, Gardens Illustrated, as well as many garden magazines in Germany, France, Italy, the Netherlands, Russia, Poland, Slovenia, the United States, Australia and Japan.

== Honours, prizes and awards ==
In 2025, Majerus won the Garden Media Guild Features Photographer of the Year Award.

In 2023, Majerus took the first prize for the European Garden Photography Award taking in the International Garden Photographer of the Year 16 competition

In 2018, Majerus took the first prize for the European Garden Photography Award taking in the International Garden Photographer of the Year 11 competition

In 2015, Majerus won the Garden Media Guild Book Photographer of the Year Award for Garden Design: A Book of Ideas (Mitchell Beazley).

In 2014, Majerus won first place in the 'Greening the City' category of the International Garden Photographer of the Year Award 2014

In 2013, Majerus won the Garden Media Guild Features Photographer of the Year Award

In 2012, during the London Cultural Olympiad, a photograph of Marianne Majerus was included in "The World in London" exhibition at Victoria Park and on Oxford Street.

In 2011, Marianne Majerus won the Garden Media Guild Photographer of the Year Award and, earlier in the year, won first place in the 'Garden Views' category of the International Garden Photographer of the Year Award 2011. Majerus also won the 'Luxembourg Book Prize' for her book Die geheimen Gärten Luxemburgs (The Secret Gardens of Luxembourg) in the 'Art and Images' category The same title also made her a finalist in the 2011 Garden Media Guild 'Book Photographer of the Year' category.

In 2011, Marianne Majerus was awarded Silver Gilt by the Royal Horticultural Society (RHS) for a portfolio of six images of the Sussex Prairie Garden.

In 2010, Marianne Majerus was named 'International Garden Photographer of the Year' for her picture 'Layered landscape: a moment captured'. The same image also won the 'People's Choice Award' as voted for by the public in the 'Garden Views' category.

In 2009, Majerus was a finalist in the Garden Media Guild's 'Photography Portfolio of the Year Award' category

In 2008, Marianne Majerus was awarded second place in the International Garden Photographer of the Year Competition in the "GPA Portfolio Category" and was a finalist in the "Portfolio Category".

She has won first prizes for Image of the Month from the Garden Photographer's Association (part of the Garden Media Guild) for September 2008, December 2008, June 2009, July 2009, August 2009, October 2009, August 2010 and October 2010. Second prize in September 2009, July 2010 and September 2010. From January 2011 Marianne Majerus ceased to enter the Image of the Month competitions.

In 2002, she was voted "Photographer of the Year" by the Garden Media Guild (then the Garden Writers' Guild).

In 2000, alongside George Carter(Garden Designer) she won the "Inspirational Book of the Year" award from the Garden Writers' Guild for the book The New London Garden

== Books as principal photographer ==
| Publication year | Title |
|---|---|
| 2026 | Cottage Gardens (Rizzoli, 2026) |
| 2026 | Small Garden Beauty (GU, 2026) |
| 2026 | Small Garden Envy (Skittledog, 2026) |
| 2025 | Marianne Majerus - In the Garden: The Art of the Ephemeral (Editions Guy Binsfeld, 2025) |
| 2024 | Die geheimen Gärten von Cornwall (Bassermann Verlag, 2024) |
| 2023 | Garden Style: A Book of Ideas (Mitchell Beazley, 2023) |
| 2023 | Jardins - Le livre de toutes les inspirations (Ulmer, 2023) |
| 2023 | Garden Style: A Book of Ideas (Rizzoli, 2023) |
| 2023 | Estilos de Jardin (Blume, 2023) |
| 2022 | Die geheimen Gärten von Cornwall. Aktualisierte Sonderausgabe: Die schönsten Refugien an Englands Südküste (Bassermann Verlag, 2022) |
| 2022 | Die geheimen Gärten von England. Aktualisierte Sonderausgabe: Entdeckungen im Gartenparadies (Bassermann Verlag, 2022) |
| 2021 | Stourhead (Apollo, 2021) |
| 2020 | Luxemburg - Land der Rosen : Schätze von gestern für Gärten von heute (Editions Schortgen) |
| 2020 | Luxembourg - Pays de la rose : Les roses d'hier inspirent les jardins d'aujourd hui (Editions Schortgen) |
| 2020 | Luxembourg - Land of roses : Yesterday's roses inspiring today's gardens (Editions Schortgen) |
| 2020 | Grow Yourself Healthy: Gardening to transform your gut health all year round (Frances Lincoln) |
| 2020 | Petits jardins design - 35 projets contemporains pour vivre au jardin (Ulmer) |
| 2019 | RHS Design Outdoors: Projects & Plans for a Stylish Garden (Mitchell Beazley) |
| 2018 | Gardens of Corfu (Impress Publishing) |
| 2018 | Setting the Scene (Pimpernel Press) |
| 2017 | The Living Jigsaw: How to Cultivate a Healthy Garden Ecology (Royal Botanic Gardens) |
| 2016 | Gärten an den italienischen Seen (Gerstenberg Verlag) |
| 2016 | Gardens of the Italian Lakes (Frances Lincoln) |
| 2016 | RHS How to Plant a Garden (Mitchell Beazley) |
| 2015 | London – seine schönsten Gärten: Eine spektakuläre Entdeckungstour (DVA) |
| 2015 | Great Gardens of London (Frances Lincoln) |
| 2015 | Die geheimen Gärten von England (DVA) |
| 2015 | Das große Buch der Gartengestaltung (DVA) |
| 2015 | Créer son jardin (Larousse) |
| 2015 | First Ladies of Gardening (Frances Lincoln) |
| 2015 | Garden Design: A Book of Ideas (Mitchell Beazley) |
| 2015 | Mein City-Garten: Planen, pflanzen, gestalten (Dorling Kindersley) |
| 2014 | Englische Gartenikonen: Die Schöpferinnen des englischen Gartenstils und ihre Gärten (DVA) |
| 2014 | The Urban Gardener (Mitchell Beazley) |
| 2012 | Die geheimen Gärten von Cornwall: Die schönsten Refugien an Englands Südküste (DVA) |
| 2011 | Die geheimen Gärten Luxemburgs (Binsfeld) |
| 2010 | Venetian Gardens (Flammarion) |
| 2008 | Pots et jardinières (Gründ) |
| 2008 | Herbes et aromates (Gründ) |
| 2007 | Traumpaare (Callwey) |
| 2007 | Passion for Roses: Peter Beales' Comprehensive Guide to Landscaping with Roses (Rizzoli International Publications) |
| 2007 | Secret Gardens of Venice (Weidenfeld) |
| 2006 | Jardins Secrets de Venise (Flammarion) |
| 2006 | Projects for Small Gardens: 56 Projects With Step-by-step Instruction |
| 2006 | Neue Ideen für winzige Gärten |
| 2005 | Garden Spaces: Simple Solutions for Planning and Design |
| 2005 | 101 Ideas Gardens |
| 2005 | Die geheimen Gärten von London (DVA) |
| 2004 | Secret Gardens of London (Weidenfeld) |
| 2004 | Jardins Secrets de Londres (Flammarion) |
| 2004 | Shrubs for the Garden (Kyle Cathie) |
| 2004 | Trees for the Garden (Kyle Cathie) |
| 2004 | Herbs: Simple Projects for the Weekend Gardener (Ryland, Peters & Small) |
| 2004 | TopfKult: Über 200 Profitipps für schönere Kübelpflanzen (Callwey) |
| 2004 | Containers: Simple Projects for the Weekend Gardener (Ryland, Peters & Small) |
| 2004 | A Passion for Roses (Mitchell Beazley) |
| 2003 | House Beautiful Container Gardens (Hearst Communications) |
| 2003 | The German Ambassador's Residence in London (Revised Edition) |
| 2003 | Cool Containers |
| 2001 | The New Tech Garden (Mitchell Beazley) |
| 2001 | Foliage |
| 2001 | Seeds: The Ultimate Guide to Growing Successfully from Seed |
| 2000 | The New London Garden (Weidenfeld) |
| 2000 | Living with Plants |
| 1999 | Gardening with Herbs |
| 1997 | Gardening with Containers |
| 1996 | Alsace Gastronomique (Conran Octopus) |
| 1993 | The German Ambassador's Residence in London (German Embassy) |
| 1992 | English Manor Houses (Weidenfeld; Rizzoli) |
| 1991 | The Garden Wall (Johnson Editions) |
| 1990 | Provence: 12 Travels with a Gastronome (George Philip) |
| 1988 | The Rose Gardens of England (Collins) |
| 1988 | The French Revolution (Simon & Schuster) |
| 1987 | Chronicles of the Age of Chivalry (Viking Penguin) |
| 1986 | The Plantagenet Chronicles (Weidenfeld) |
| 1985 | The Domesday Book: England's Heritage Then and Now (Hutchison; Viking) |

== Books as featured photographer ==
| Publication year | Title |
|---|---|
| 2025 | Tough Plants: Garden gladiators that pack a punch in extreme weather (OH, 2025) |
| 2024 | Les jardins secs de James Basson (Editions Ulmer, 2024) |
| 2021 | The Naturally Beautiful Garden: Contemporary Designs to Please the Eye and Support Nature (Rizzoli, 2021) |
| 2021 | Gardens in My Life: The Favourite Gardens of World-famous Landscape Designer Arabella Lennox-Boyd (Apollo, 2021) |
| 2021 | Tom Stuart-Smith: Drawn from the Land (Thames and Hudson, 2021) |
| 2021 | Highgrove: Ein Jahr im königlichen Garten (BusseSeewald, 2021) |
| 2019 | English Gardens: From the Archives of Country Life Magazine (Rizzoli, 2019) |
| 2017 | Junges Gartendesign - Terrassen und Sitzplätze |
| 2017 | Sichtschutz und Raumteiler im Garten |
| 2016 | Wasser im Garten 2 - Das große Ideenbuch |
| 2016 | Gartenideen - Akzente für kleine und große Gärten |
| 2015 | Kleine Gärten vergrößern - So optimieren Sie Raumwirkung und Nutzwert |
| 2015 | Moderne Gartenkonzepte - Gartengestaltung passend zur Architektur |
| 2015 | Highgrove: Ein Jahr im königlichen Garten |
| 2014 | Highgrove: A Garden Celebrated |
| 2014 | Grüne Inseln - Kleine Gärten in der City |
| 2014 | Gartenhäuser, Wintergärten, Überdachungen - Das große Ideenbuch |
| 2014 | Junges Gartendesign - Kreativ, stylish, machbar |
| 2013 | Der Naturgarten. Planen - Gestalten - Pflegen |
| 2013 | Modernes Gartendesign - Das große Ideenbuch |
| 2012 | Design für pflegeleichte Gärten - Das große Ideenbuch |
| 2012 | Nutzgärten Gestalten - Pflanzen - Pflegen. Kreative Praxis rund um Gemüse, Kräuter und Blumen |
| 2012 | Naturstein im Garten: Das grosse Ideenbuch |
| 2012 | Projets pour petits jardins : 56 projets à réaliser pas à pas |
| 2011 | Landhaus-Gärten – Paradiese ohne Grenzen |
| 2011 | Sichtschutz im Garten - Das große Ideenbuch. Hecken, Mauern, Zäune |
| 2011 | Ideenbuch Sitzplätze |
| 2011 | International Garden Photographer of the Year: Collection 4 |
| 2010 | International Garden Photographer of the Year: Collection 3 |
| 2010 | Kleine Gärten – Das große Ideenbuch |
| 2010 | Neues Design für kleine Gärten |
| 2008 | International Garden Photographer of the Year: Collection 1 |
| 2008 | Gestaltung mit Rosen: Das große Ideenbuch |
| 2006 | Projets pour petits jardins : 56 Projets à réaliser pas à pas |
| 2005 | 101 Conseils Jardin |

== Exhibitions ==
| Date | Exhibition Name | Location 1 | Location 2 | Description |
|---|---|---|---|---|
| 2025 | Marianne Majerus - Garden Photographs | Luxembourg Embassy, Berlin. | | An exhibition of Marianne's photography. |
| 2025 | Marianne Majerus - In the Garden: The Art of the Ephemeral | Neumünster Abbey, Luxembourg. | | An exhibition in the cloisters of the Abbey showing a curated selection of Marianne's work as part of LUGA. |
| 2025 | Plant Portraits | Parc de Merl, Luxembourg. | | An open-air exhibition examining and celebrating the beauty of fleeting moments in the life of plants through a carefully chosen selection of intimate plant portraits displayed in large glass panels. |
| 2023 | International Garden Photographer of the Year 2023 | Royal Botanic Gardens, Kew, United Kingdom. | Various location within the United Kingdom. | Marianne Majerus's work features as the winning picture in the 'European Garden Photographer of the Year' of the International Garden Photographer of the Year Award 2023. |
| 2018 | International Garden Photographer of the Year 2018 | Royal Botanic Gardens, Kew, United Kingdom. | Various location within the United Kingdom. | Marianne Majerus's work features as the winning picture in the 'European Garden Photographer of the Year' of the International Garden Photographer of the Year Award 2018. |
| 2014 | International Garden Photographer of the Year 2014 | Royal Botanic Gardens, Kew, United Kingdom. | Various location within the United Kingdom. | Marianne Majerus's work features as the winning picture in the 'Greening the City' category of the International Garden Photographer of the Year Award 2014. |
| 2013 | Gartenfokus | Stiftung Schloss Dyck, Germany | | |
| 2011 | Royal Horticultural Society Photographic Exhibition | RHS London Autumn Harvest Show, London | | Exhibition of images from Sussex Prairie Garden. |
| 2011 | International Garden Photographer of the Year 2011 | Royal Botanic Gardens, Kew, United Kingdom. | Various location within the United Kingdom. | Marianne Majerus's work features as the winning picture in the 'Garden Views Category' of the International Garden Photographer of the Year Award 2011. |
| 2010 | International Garden Photographer of the Year 2010 | Royal Botanic Gardens, Kew, United Kingdom. | Various location within the United Kingdom. | As the winner of the International Garden Photographer of the Year Award, as well as the People's Choice Award, Majerus's winning photograph is the centrepiece of the exhibition. |
| 2008 | International Garden Photographer of the Year 2008 | Royal Botanic Gardens, Kew, United Kingdom. | Various location within the United Kingdom. | After gaining two citations in the 'Portfolio' categories from the International Garden Photographer of the Year Competition Majerus's photographs appeared in the year's exhibition. |
| 2005 | Private Places | Geffrye Museum, Shoreditch, London, United Kingdom. | N/A | Majerus's photographs appeared alongside other high-profile photographers as part of The Garden Photographers' Association exhibition of new work exploring the relationship between people and the personal havens they make in our cities and towns. |
| 2002 | Professional Women Gardeners | Museum of Garden History, Lambeth, London, United Kingdom. | N/A | This portrait collection of contemporary women gardeners appeared as part of an artistic season entitled How Does Her Garden Grow?, which followed the history of women professional gardeners since the first women's horticultural training colleges opened at the end of the 19th century. |
| 1997 | Collections and Reflections | Sainsbury Centre for Visual Arts, Essex, United Kingdom. | N/A | |
| 1997 | Visage Extérieur / The Face Outside | Galerie Clairefontaine, Luxembourg City. | N/A | A selection of portraits of famous Luxembourgers living throughout the world. |
| 1995 | Visage Extérieur / The Face Outside | La Galerie d'art d'Esch-sur-Alzette, Luxembourg. | The Church of Our Most Holy Redeemer, Clerkenwell, London, United Kingdom. | A selection of portraits of famous Luxembourgers living throughout the world commissioned by the Luxembourg Ministry of Culture during Luxembourg's year as European Capital of Culture. |
| 1995 | Fotofeis | International Festival of Photography, Scotland. | Musée de la Photographie, Brussels | |
| 1982 | East Coast | Travelling exhibition sponsored by the Arts Council of Great Britain. | N/A | Images of the East Anglian seaside. |

== Literature ==
- Raymond Reuter: 100 Lëtzebuerger ronderëm d'Welt (100 Luxembourgers Around the World), Page. 124: Marianne Majerus, 2003, Éditions Luxnews, ISBN 2-9599932-2-5
