= Batty Fischer =

Jean-Baptiste (Batty) Fischer (1877–1958) was a Luxembourgish dentist and amateur photographer. He is best remembered for his collection of some 10,000 photographs that richly document the development of Luxembourg City from the end of the 19th century until the 1950s.

== Early life and family ==
Batty Fischer was born on 24 July 1877 in the Marché aux Herbes opposite the Grand Ducal palace where his parents, Josef Fischer and Marguerite Marie Ferron, had a shop dealing in fashionable clothes and furs. Batty was the eldest of three children; his sister Marguerite and brother Fritz were later to take over the family business. After graduating from high school, Fischer studied dentistry at the Ecole Dentaire in Paris.

== Professional career ==
At the age of 20, Fischer returned to Luxembourg and started a practice on the Grand-Rue which he later moved to a building near the Brasserie Pôle Nord adjacent to the Pont Adolphe. In 1942, after being deprived of his licence by the occupying Nazis on the grounds that he was too supportive of the French, he practiced on the corner of Boulevard d'Avranches and Avenue de la Gare.

== Amateur photography ==
While dentistry was Fischer's profession, his real interest was photography. He could often be seen strolling around the town with his camera, waiting to take photographs of any interesting items which caught his eye. Indeed, always a bachelor, he devoted a great deal of his spare time to his hobby. Considered something of a dilettante, he showed considerable interest in art and music, associating with numerous local painters, writers and journalists. Fischer was also inventive in putting together his own telephoto lenses. After making all the calculations, he would order the necessary lens elements from a local optician and encase them in varnished home-made papier-mâché tubes, providing equipment of a type which at the time could not be obtained commercially.

While Fischer showed great interest in photographing buildings and items of physical interest in the town of Luxembourg and its surroundings, he was also adept at photographing local men, women and children in their natural surroundings, often at their place of work. His shots often convey an unusual liveliness as he managed to catch his subjects in the course of their normal activities, sometimes amusingly portraying their leisure moments. Unlike other extant photographs of Luxembourg from the same period, those taken by Fischer are rather special in their number and continuity. Every weekend when he was free to walk around the town, Fischer would take the most recent examples of his work to the local authorities and receive a few hundred francs on condition he wrote a short description of the historical context on the back. In this way, Fischer left a full record of how the town evolved over a lengthy period, from the Belle Époque to the post-war years.

Batty Fischer died in Luxembourg City on 27 December 1958. A half-used roll of film was found in his camera.

== Collection ==
Some 10,000 photographs taken by Fischer between 1890 and 1958 can be viewed at the Photothèque in Luxembourg City.
