= Yvon Lambert (photographer) =

Luxembourgish photographer (born 1955)

Yvon Lambert (born 9 March 1955) is a Luxembourgish photographer who has both worked as a freelance photojournalist and completed a number of international reportages on societal issues.

== Biography ==
After studying photography in Brussels in the 1980s, Lambert worked as a freelance photographer. In 1990 and 1991, he spent long periods in Naples under the framework of Pépinières européennes pour jeunes artistes in support of young artists. This led to his first book: Naples, un hiver (1993). From 1993, he travelled to several Central European countries. In 1995, under the project: D'est en ouest, chemins de terre et d'Europe (From east to west, roads through Europe's farmlands) organized by the Centre Georges Pompidou in Paris, he was responsible for photographing rural scenes in Romania. His work was subsequently presented at the Pompidou Centre. The same year, participating in the Grand Prix de la Ville de Vevey, he received the Prix du Grand Format for his Histoires de Frontières.

In Luxembourg, he also published reportages on the last days of a steel production plant and on the decline of Luxembourg's mining district (2000). Other projects he has completed include Derniers feux (1998), Retours de Roumanie. Photographies 1992–2003 (2004), and Brennweiten der Begegnung (2005).

In the autumn of 2004, Lambert spent five weeks in New York photographing life in the city streets. This led to an exhibition presented by the Luxembourg authorities at the Maison du Luxembourg à New York titled Chroniques New-Yorkaises.
