= Edouard Kutter (1887) =

Édouard Frédéric Henri Kutter (1887–1978) was a Luxembourgish photographer, the son of Swiss-born Paul Kutter, who had established a studio in Luxembourg City in 1883.

== Early life and family ==
Edouard Kutter was the eldest of four children. His brother, Joseph Kutter (1894–1941), became one of Luxembourg's foremost painters, while Bernard (1889–1961) also became a photographer. His third brother was Paul Kutter Jr. (1899–1941) and his sister Catherine Louise Marie (1891–1958). Edouard began working as an apprentice with his father in 1898 before studying photography at some of the most highly developed studios in Germany and Austria.

== Career ==
Kutter returned to Luxembourg shortly before the First World War. After managing a branch of his father's business for a few months in 1917, he opened his own studio at 4, avenue de la Liberté, in 1918. The same year, Grand Duchess Marie-Adélaïde gave him the title of court photographer. As a result, he took many photographs of the Grand Ducal family, which can be viewed today in Luxembourg's Photothèque.

Edouard Kutter died in Luxembourg City on 3 November 1978, leaving a son, Édouard Kutter Jr., who also became court photographer.
