= Edouard Kutter (1934) =

Luxembourgish photographer and publisher (1934–2022)

Édouard Kutter Jr. (5 November 1934 – 17 May 2022) was a Luxembourgish photographer and publisher. The son of the photographer Édouard Kutter Sr. (1887–1978), he was appointed court photographer in 1966. In 1963, he took over his father's photographic business. In 1986, with the agreement of the Court, he donated to Luxembourg's Photothèque some two thousand photographs of the Grand Ducal family taken by his father between 1896 and 1960. At the end of 1989, he also donated his own collection of images taken between 1960 and 1980 documenting the development of the city.

Kutter died on 17 May 2022, at the age of 87.

== Publications ==
- Luxembourg: paysages du Grand-Duché Édouard Kutter, Joseph Goedert, Nicolas Hein - 1970 - 27 pages
