= List of newspapers in Luxembourg =

The number of national daily newspapers in Luxembourg was five both in 1950 and in 1965. Until 2001 there were six dailies and it became eight when two more dailies were launched. This is a list of newspapers published in Luxembourg.

== List of newspapers ==
Name	Frequency	Publisher	Language	Website
Telecran	Weekly	Saint-Paul	German	www.telecran.lu/
Contacto	Weekly	Saint-Paul	Portuguese	www.jornal-contacto.lu
Lëtzebuerger Journal	Daily	Imprimerie Centrale	German	www.journal.lu/
D'Lëtzebuerger Land	Weekly	Imprimerie Centrale	German	www.land.lu/
Le Quotidien	Daily	Editpress	French	www.lequotidien.lu
Revue	Weekly	Editpress	German	www.revue.lu/
Tageblatt	Daily	Editpress	German	www.tageblatt.lu/
Luxemburger Wort	Daily	Saint-Paul	German	www.wort.lu/
Woxx	Weekly	Independent	German, French	www.woxx.lu/
Zeitung vum Lëtzebuerger Vollek	Daily	Independent	German	www.zlv.lu/
L'essentiel	Free daily	Edita SA (Editpress/Tamedia)	French, German (only online)	www.lessentiel.lu/fr/, www.lessentiel.lu/de/
Nachrichten - Der Nachrichten Channel	Free daily	Independent	German	www.haschcon.com/
Lëtzebuerg Privat	Weekly	Presse de Nicolas	German	http://www.luxprivat.lu/
PROMI	Weekly	Presse de Nicolas	German	http://www.promilux.lu/
Goosch.lu	Weekly		Luxembourgish	http://www.goosch.lu/
Lokal express				http://www.express.lu
Muselzeidung				http://www.muselzeidung.lu/
SIMOURQ news	Weekly	SIMOURQ asbl	Multilingual (French, English, Spanish, Turkish, Arabic, Persian, Urdu, Kurdish)	

=== Defunct newspapers ===
Name	Frequency	Date	Publisher	Language	Website
A-Z Luxemburger Illustrierte	weekly	(1933–1940)		German	
Courrier du Grand-Duché de Luxembourg		(29 June 1844 – 27 December 1868)		French	
Der Kampf	weekly	(18 November 1920 – 1922)	Communist Party of Luxembourg	German	
Journal de la ville et du Grand-Duché de Luxembourg		(1826–1844)		French	
La Clef du cabinet des princes de l'Europe					
Le Jeudi	weekly	(17 April 1997 – 6 June 2019)	Editpress	French	www.jeudi.lu
Luxemburger Volksblatt (1880–87)		(1880–1887)		German	
Luxemburger Volksblatt (1901–02)		(1901–1902)		German	
Luxemburger Volksblatt (1933–41)		(1933–1941)		German	
Luxemburger Wochenblatt					
Luxemburger Zeitung		(9 March 1868-29 September 1941)		German	
Obermosel-Zeitung		(2 July 1931 – 3 April 1948)		German	
De Peck-Villchen					
Der Proletarier (1919)	weekly	(1919–1940)			
Der Volksfreund (1848)					
La Voix du Luxembourg		(2001-30 September 2011)		French	www.voix.lu
D'Ro'd Wullmaus		(7 April 1848- 29 June 1849)		German	
