= Batty Weber =

Luxembourgish journalist, author (1860–1940)

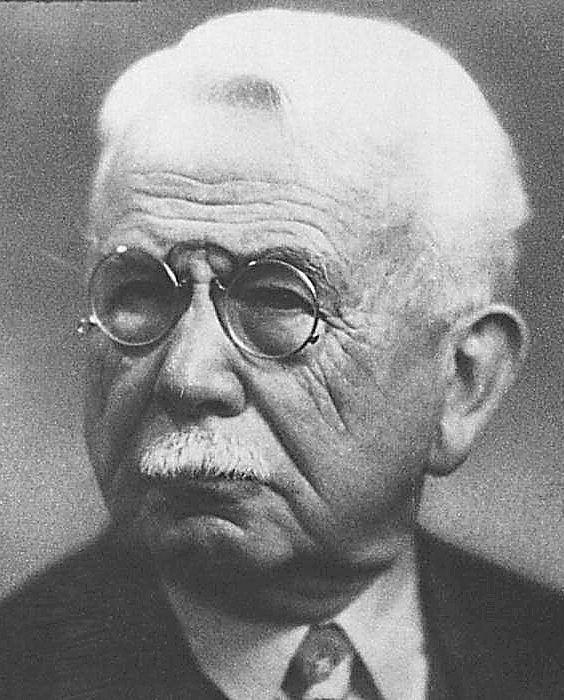
Batty Weber

Jean-Baptiste "Batty" Weber (1860–1940) is considered to have been one of Luxembourg's most influential journalists and authors, contributing much to the development of the country's national identity. His style is characterized by his sense of humour and skillful use of irony.

== Early life ==
Born on 25 November 1860 in Rumelange in south-western Luxembourg, he was the son of the local schoolmaster, Michel Weber, and his wife Marie-Catherine Klein. The family soon moved to Stadtbredimus on the Moselle where Weber spent much of his childhood. After attending the Athénée in Luxembourg City, he studied philology at the universities of Berlin and Bonn, developing an interest in the theatre. Batty Weber married Emma Brugmann on 23 July, 1904.

== Career ==
After his studies, Weber started to work in Luxembourg's civil service administration, developing his skills as a stenographer. Not satisfied with administrative work, he began to contribute to newspapers publishing his first short story "Mein Freund Günther" in Das Luxemburger Land in 1883. He was soon contributing both news articles and short stories to newspapers at home and abroad. After "Wolf Frank" (1887) was published in the Luxemburger Zeitung, Weber began to contribute to the Escher Zeitung with "Bella Ghitta" (1889), his first story about the mining area of the south, followed by "Hart am Abgrund" (1890), "Der Amerikaner" (1891) and "Die Verderberin" (1891). In 1893, he became editor in chief at the Luxemburger Zeitung.

Weber also began to write poems in Luxembourgish including "Dem Jabbo seng Kap" which is still popular in Luxembourg today. His once highly successful but now forgotten first novel Fenn Kass, Roman eines Erlösten draws on his schooldays in Luxembourg. It was serialized in the Kölnische Zeitung in 1912 before being published in book form the following year. While his novels were written in German, most of the numerous light-hearted plays from 1895 to 1922 were in Luxembourgish although A Mondorf (1900) and Le couscous de la belle-mère were in French.

In 1923, in connection with Dicks' 100th anniversary, he published his "Erënnerongen un den Dicks". Weber also did much to promote Luxembourg's budding cultural talents including authors such as Alex Weicker, Marie-Henriette Steil, Albert Hoefler, and Emile Marx and the painters Joseph Kutter, Harry Rabinger, Jean Schaak and Nico Klopp. One of Weber's most important contributions to Luxembourg's identity was his "Abreisskalender", a daily column he contributed from 1913 to 1940 to the Luxemburger Zeitung, commenting on items of local cultural interest.

In 1904 (23 July 1904), he married Emma Brugmann. Batty Weber died in Luxembourg City on 14 December 1940, and was buried in the Notre-Dame Cemetery.

== Batty Weber Prize ==
Since 1987, the Batty Weber Prize, Luxembourg's national literary prize, has been awarded to a Luxembourgish writer for their entire literary work.

== Selected works ==
- 1882: Mein Freund Günther
- 1889: Bella Ghita
- 1890: Hart am Abgrund
- 1891: Der Amerikaner
- 1891: Verderberin
- 1909: Über Mischkultur in Luxemburg
- 1912: Fenn Kaß
- 1922: Nick Carter auf dem Dorf
- 1923: Der Inseltraum
- 1926: Hände
