= Albert Simon =

Luxembourgish caricaturist (1901–1956)

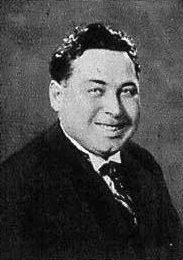
- Born: 3 July 1901; Sanem, Luxembourg
- Died: 13 March 1956 (aged 54); Esch-sur-Alzette, Luxembourg
- Occupation: Painter

Albert Simon (3 July 1901 – 13 March 1956) was a Luxembourgish cartoonist and caricaturist.

== Biography ==
Simon was born into a peasant family in Sanem (otherwise Suessem or Sessenheim). His artistic ability was recognised early and he received training firstly in Luxembourg, in the Lycée des arts et métiers (Luxembourgish: déi fréier Handwierkerschoul), and then in Munich, where his talent was soon recognised and he was taken on by the prestigious satirical journal Simplicissimus. He then moved to Paris for further experience. His work was part of the painting event in the art competition at the 1924 Summer Olympics.

He returned to Luxembourg in the late 1920s. From 1930 he worked for the Tageblatt and from 1934 for the A-Z Luxemburger Illustrierte. Because of the political stance of his work and his mockery of Hitler he was twice condemned to death by the Nazi government. In 1940 when the Germans invaded he was obliged to flee the country and spent the rest of the war working under a false name in France. After the end of the war in 1945 he returned to Luxembourg and resumed his work for the Tageblatt. He also founded a satirical journal, De Peck-Villchen, which he directed until his death.

He died in Esch-sur-Alzette and was buried in Sanem, where a street is named after him, as also in Contern.
