= Luxemburger Volksblatt =

Luxemburger Volksblatt may refer to:

- Luxemburger Volksblatt (1880–87), a newspaper published in Luxembourg between 1880 and 1887
- Luxemburger Volksblatt (1901–02), a newspaper published in Luxembourg between 1901 and 1902
- Luxemburger Volksblatt (1933–41), a newspaper published in Luxembourg between 1933 and 1941
