= D'Lëtzebuerger Land =

Luxembourgish newspaper

d'Lëtzebuerger Land
- Type: Weekly newspaper
- Founded: 1 January 1954
- Language: German, French and Luxembourgish.
- Circulation: 19,400 (2023)
- Website: www.land.lu

d'Lëtzebuerger Land (Luxembourgish pronunciation: [ˈdlətsəbu̯əjɐ ˈlɑnt], (lit. 'The Luxembourgish Country') is a weekly newspaper published in Luxembourg. It is in German, French and Luxembourgish.

== History and profile ==
d'Lëtzebuerger Land was established in 1954. The founders were a group of financiers.

It was created as a liberal weekly newspaper by Carlo Hemmer, as a targeted response to the party newspapers' monopoly on public opinion (the Luxemburger Wort and Tageblatt), and the disappearance of a liberal press. The first edition appeared on 1 January 1954. Throughout the following decades, the Lëtzebuerger Land argued in favour of free trade, business, European integration, environmental protection, and the left-liberal coalition. It tried to differentiate itself from the daily press through its detailed analytical articles and by providing a forum of high-level discussion.

Léo Kinsch (1926-1983) studied journalism in Paris and worked for L’Écho de l'industrie; he was first mentioned as editor of the Land on 26 June 1958, after Hemmer was named as director of the European Commission in Brussels. Kinsch had bought the newspaper from Hemmer. On 22 December 1982, it passed into the hands of Éditions d’Letzeburger Land s.à r.l., and finally, on 28 June 1986, into the hands of the Fondation d’Lëtzebuerger Land. Through its financial stake in 1986 in the Revue and in 1992 in the Eldoradio radio station, the Land took part in the short-lived attempt to create a liberal media group as a counterweight to the group Saint-Paul Luxembourg, as well as Editpress.

The newspaper received €259,954 in annual state press subsidy in 2009. By 2022, that subsidy had risen to €419,972.

In 2004 the circulation of d'Lëtzebuerger Land was 7,000 copies. In 2023, the circulation was almost 20,000 copies.
