= Press subsidy in Luxembourg =

A press subsidy (Luxembourgish: Staatlech Pressehëllef) is given by the government to newspapers in Luxembourg under the Law of 13 August 1998 on the Promotion of the Printed Press. They are awarded automatically to all general-interest newspapers appearing at least once a week that have full-time staffs of at least five journalists and of which advertisements constitute less than 50% of the newspaper.

The total programme amounted to €7,754,499 in 2009. One-third of the total subsidy is spread evenly between qualifying newspapers, with the other two-thirds being proportional to the number of pages. All newspapers except the dominant Luxemburger Wort depend on the press subsidy for survival.

In addition, newspapers received indirect subsidy by a preferential postal rate, a ceiling on television and radio advertising, and a reduced value added tax rate of 3%.

== 2009 subsidies ==
Newspaper	Subsidy (€)
Tageblatt	1,659,554
Luxemburger Wort	1,524,658
Le Quotidien	1,197,239
La Voix du Luxembourg	933,221
Lëtzebuerger Journal	540,421
Télécran	375,763
Le Jeudi	358,005
Zeitung vum Lëtzebuerger Vollek	353,281
Revue	321,984
D'Lëtzebuerger Land	259,954
Woxx	230,417
Total	7,754,499
Source: Service Information et Press
