= Lux-Post =

- Type: Free weekly newspaper
- Publisher: Editpress
- Language: French and German
- Headquarters: Differdange
- Circulation: 135,000

Lux-Post is a free weekly newspaper published in Luxembourg. It is published by Editpress. Lux-Post has the largest circulation of any newspaper in the country, with over 135,000 copies distributed a week.
