= Joseph Dinouart =

French priest and writer (1716–1786)

Abbé Dinouart
- Born: Joseph-Antoine-Toussaint Dinouart; November 1, 1716; Amiens, France
- Died: April 23, 1786 (aged 69); Paris, France
- Occupations: Roman Catholic priest of the Diocese of Amiens, writer, preacher, polemicist, compiler of sacred sciences
- Era: Age of Enlightenment
- Known for: Apology for French feminism
- Notable work: The Art of Keeping Silent (1771)
- Title: Abbé (Abbot)

Joseph Antoine Toussaint Dinouart (November 1, 1716 – April 23, 1786) was a preacher, polemicist, compiler of sacred learning, and apologist for French feminism.

== Biography ==
Born in Amiens, he was ordained as a priest in there in 1740. In his youth, he showed a talent for Latin poetry, but soon neglected this in favor of his religious studies. After writing a short essay on women's rights, he had a falling out with his bishop and moved to Paris, where he joined the Saint-Eustache parish. He soon left, however, to tutor the son of a police lieutenant. This position gave him a stable yearly income and allowed Dinouart to devote himself to the study of literature.

As early as 1755, Dinouart collaborated on Abbé Joannet's Journal chrétien; however, having reiterated in that publication the accusation of deism—and even atheism—against Sainte-Foix, he and his associate faced a criminal lawsuit brought by the latter at the Grand Châtelet, and both were ordered to retract their statements.

In 1760, he founded the Journal ecclésiastique, which he edited until his death. The collected work of this journal numbers more than 100 volumes. It contains extracts from sermons, treatises on morality and piety, and research on ecclesiastical law and councils.

Dinouart had been admitted as a member of the Pontifical Academy of Arcadia in Rome.

== Written works ==
- Lettre à l'abbé Gouget, au sujet des hymnes de Santeuil, adoptées dans le nouveau Bréviaire. Arras.
  - Bibliographic note: The author complains about changes made to some of the Latin poet's hymns. The Abbé de Laverde took issue with this criticism, and Dinouart retorted that same year with a vitriolic piece titled, Le Camouflet. (1748, quarto).
- Le Triomphe du sexe. Amsterdam, 1749, in-12. Dedicated to la marquise du Châtelet. Digitized on gallica.
  - Bibliographic note: Abbé Dinouart sought to prove—if not, as Antoine-Alexandre Barbier put it, the superiority of women over men, then at least their equality. It was this work that displeased the List of Bishops of Amiens.
- Éloquence du corps dans le ministère de la chaire. 1754 [Privilège royal, 1752], in-12, 2nd edition, corrected and enlarged, ibid., 1761, same format.
- Manuel des pasteurs, 1764, 2 vol. in-12; reprinted, Lyon, 1768, 3 vol. in-12. Bibliographic note: This is a selection from the best rituals, and it could prove useful to country priests.
- Exercitium diurnum, seu Manuale precum in usum et gratiam sacerdotum; nunc denuo editum a sacerdote gallicano exsule, Vienna en Austria, 1797, in-8°, posthumously published.
- Hymns and other Latin poems, an indication of which can be found in the "France littéraire" section of the Journal ecclésiastique de 1780 et dans l'Histoire littéraire d'Amiens du P. Dairé, 347p.

== Works translated ==
Abbot Dinouart is also credited with a large number of translations, including:

- La Rhétorique du Prédicateur (The Rhetoric of the Preacher), translated from the Latin of Augustin Valerio, Bishop of Verona and cardinal, Paris, duodecimo (in-12).
- La Sarcothée, translation of the Latin poem by the Jesuit Masétrius, Paris, Barbou, duodecimo (in-12).
- Oraisons de Cicéron contre Verres et Oratio pro Murena (Cicero's Orations against Verres and Oratio pro Murena), with facing text, Paris, Barbou, 1757, duodecimo (in-12).
- Histoire d'Alexandre le Grand (History of Alexander the Great), by Quinte-Curce, with the supplements of Johann Freinshémius, Paris, Barbou, 1759, 2 vols., duodecimo (in-12).
- Abrégé de l'embryologie sacrée, ou traité des devoirs des prêtres, des médecins, des chirurgiens et des sages-femmes, sur le salut éternel des enfants qui sont dans le ventre de leur mère (Abridgment of Sacred Embryology, or Treatise on the Duties of Priests, Doctors, Surgeons, and Midwives, regarding the Eternal Salvation of Children in their Mother's Womb), translated from the Latin of Doctor Francesco Emanuele Cangiamila, Paris, 1762, duodecimo (in-12), and ibid., 1766, same format. The physician Augustin Roux contributed to this translation.
- La République des jurisconsultes, précédée d'une notice sur la vie et les écrits de l'auteur Gennaro, célèbre avocat napolitain, suivie de l'analyse d'un traité italien du même auteur sur l'Abus de l'éloquence dans le barreau, et d'un poème latin sur la loi des Douze Tables (The Republic of Jurisconsults, preceded by a notice on the life and writings of the author Gennaro, a famous Neapolitan lawyer, followed by the analysis of an Italian treatise by the same author on the Abuse of Eloquence at the Bar, and a Latin poem on the Law of the Twelve Tables), Paris, 1768, duodecimo (in-12).

== Works edited ==
- L'Art de se taire. Originally published in Paris, 1771, petit in-12, almost verbatim reprint of the Conduite pour se taire et pour parler, principalement en matière de religion, anonymously published work of priest Jacques Du Rosel, Jesuit, printed in Paris, 1696, in-12. Bibliographic note: Regarding this latest instance of plagiarism, see a letter from the abbé Jean-Baptiste Grosier, inserted into l'Année littéraire, 1772, t. 8, p. 268). Finally, Dinouart worked with Abbé Jaubert on the drafting of Anecdotes ecclésiastiques, Paris, 1772, 2 vol. in-12; he inserted several pieces of literature into the Journal de Verdun, and left a few manuscript works. Barbier, in his Examen critique des Dictionnaires historiques, devoted a long article to it. One can also profitably consult the France littéraire de Quérard.
  - Editions:
1. 'L'Art de se taire. Éditions Payot, 2018. 145p. ISBN 9782228920957. French.
2. L'Art de se taire. Éditions Jérôme Millon, 1986. 192p. ISBN 2905614099. French.
3. L’arte di tacere. Edizioni Theoria, 2025. ISBN 9788854983991. Italian.
