= ZVL =

ZVL may refer to:

- Villeneuve Airport, Alberta, Canada, often abbreviated ZVL
- Zavalíaite, phosphate mineral, mineral symbol Zvl
- Zeitung vum Lëtzebuerger Vollek, Luxembourger newspaper
- Zoonotic visceral leishmaniasis, a disease that may be linked to lutzomyia longipalpis
- Zoster vaccine live, vaccine against shingles
- ZVL Leiden, Dutch water polo club
