= Volksblatt =

Volksblatt (German for "People's Journal") may refer to any of several newspapers:

- Giddings Deutsches Volksblatt, a German-American newspaper published 1899–1949 in Giddings, Texas
- Hermanner Volksblatt, a German-American newspaper published from around 1856 until 1928 in Hermann, Missouri
- Liechtensteiner Volksblatt, a daily newspaper in Liechtenstein
- Luxemburger Volksblatt (disambiguation), the title of multiple newspapers published in Luxembourg
- Mülhauser Volksblatt, a daily newspaper published 1892–1897 in Mülhausen (Mulhouse), Germany
- Neues Volksblatt, a newspaper published in Linz, Austria
- Ostrauer Volksblatt, a socialist newspaper published 1912–1922 in Austria-Hungary, later Czechoslovakia
- Pittsburger Volksblatt, a German-American newspaper published from 1859 to 1901 in Pittsburgh, Pennsylvania
- Tägliches Cincinnatier Volksblatt, a German-American newspaper published from 1836 until 1919 in Cincinnati, Ohio
