= A-Z Luxemburger Illustrierte =

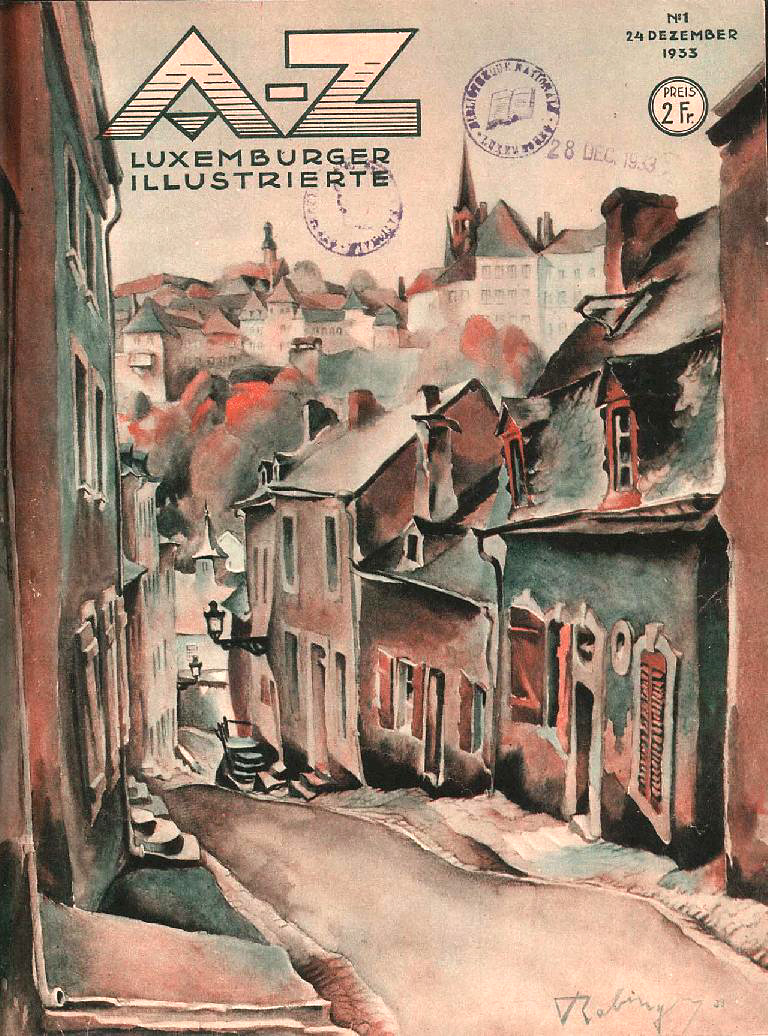
- The first issue of AZ (1/1933)
- Frequency: weekly
- Founded: 1933
- First issue: Christmas Day, 1933
- Country: Luxembourg
- Language: German language

The A-Z Luxemburger Illustrierte was a German-language newspaper published in Luxembourg between 1933 and 1940. The paper was published weekly.

== History ==
The first issue, published on Christmas Day, 1933, featured a tableau by Henri Rabinger on the title page. Page five featured artwork by Sosthène Weis. Contributions included a short story by Émile Marx, an interview with Batty Weber about dialect theater, and an article by Tony Jungblut about the city's soup kitchens, where about 800 people were fed every day. The editor was Franz Stoltz.

In the summer of 1934, the then Tageblatt director Hubert Clément acted as editor. The illustrated edition was then produced in the cooperative printing house.
