= Águas Claras, Salvador =

Neighborhood in Salvador, Bahia, Brazil

Coordinates: 12°53′16.69″S 38°26′3.84″W

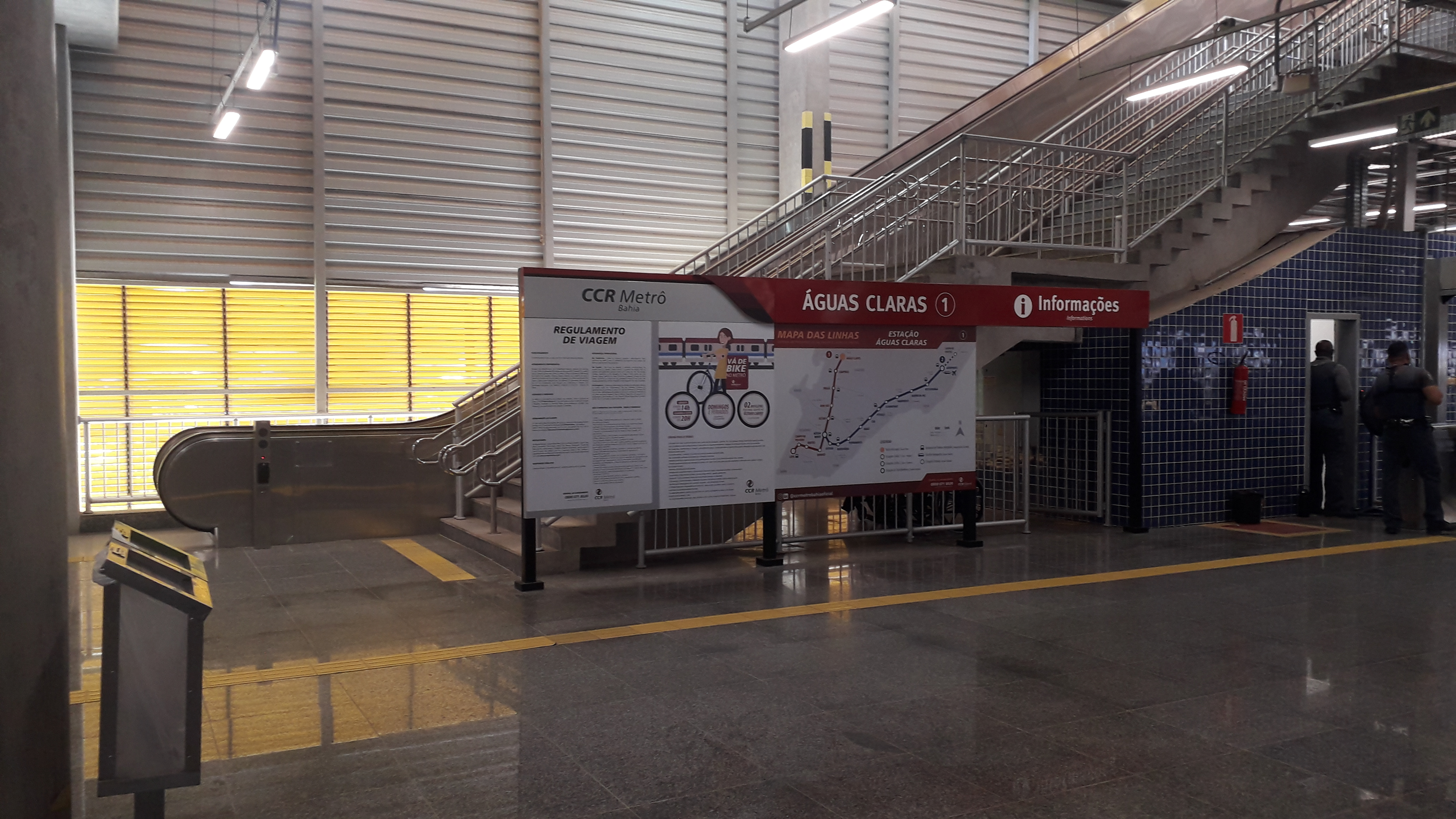
Interior of the Águas Claras Station of the Salvador Metro.

Águas Claras (lit. 'Clear Waters') is a neighborhood located in Salvador, Bahia, Brazil, on the BR-324 highway, near the city limits to the northwest. Like most neighborhoods in the city center, it faces problems such as insufficient basic infrastructure. Various voluntary and government initiatives have helped to alleviate this situation. The neighborhood has public schools, container storage warehouses, and other facilities.

Due to public transportation projects in the neighborhood, real estate speculation has increased the price per square meter of land along BR-324, despite it still being one of the areas most lacking in urban infrastructure in Salvador. The neighborhood belongs to Administrative Region XIV (Fourteen) - "Cajazeiras".

== Demographics ==
It was listed as one of the most dangerous neighborhoods in the city, according to data from the Brazilian Institute of Geography and Statistics (IBGE) and the Secretariat of Public Security (SSP) published in the neighborhood-by-neighborhood violence map by the newspaper Correio in 2012. It was among the most violent as a result of the homicide rate for every hundred thousand inhabitants per year (with UN reference) having reached the second most negative level, with the indicator of "61-90", being one of the worst neighborhoods on the list. In May 2018, it was among the neighborhoods with the highest rate of car theft in Salvador.
