= Revue (disambiguation) =

A revue is a theatrical act with music, dance, and sketches.

Revue may also refer to:

- Revue (album), 1982 album by the World Saxophone Quartet
- Revue (magazine), a Luxembourgish weekly magazine
- Revue (typeface), a typeface created by Stephenson Blake
- Revue (Twitter), a discontinued newsletter service owned by Twitter, Inc.
