= Lëtzebuerger Journal =

Luxembourgish online newspaper

- Type: Digital magazine
- Owner: Editions Lëtzeburger Journal S.A.
- Publisher: Editions Letzeburger Journal
- Editor-in-chief: Melody Hansen
- General manager: Daniel Nepgen (Managing director); Lynn Warken (Content director)
- Staff writers: Christian Block, Camille Frati, Lex Kleren, Misch Pautsch, Sarah Raparoli, Audrey Somnard, Pascal Steinwachs
- Founded: 5 April 1948
- Language: German, French, English
- Headquarters: Luxembourg City
- Price: 168€ per year
- Website: www.journal.lu

The Lëtzebuerger Journal (Luxembourgish pronunciation: [ˈlətsəbu̯əjɐ ˈʒuʁnɑl], lit. 'Luxembourgish Newspaper') is a Luxembourgish online magazine. It was formerly a daily newspaper published six times a week until 1 January 2021. The online magazine is currently managed by Daniel Nepgen (managing director), Lynn Warken (content director) and Melody Hansen (editor-in-chief).

== History and profile ==
Lëtzebuerger Journal was first published on 5 April 1948, replacing the Obermosel-Zeitung and l'Unio'n, which ceased publication the same year. Both of those newspapers were attempts to create a mass-circulation liberal newspaper, like the Luxemburger Zeitung of the pre-war era, which had a long tradition, but had been discredited politically. Although the paper was published in German it also had sections published in French.

Henri Koch-Kent was editor 1959–1963. Since around 1980, Rob Roemen edited for some 30 years, including 25 years as editor-in-chief till July 2005.

In 2004 the newspaper had a circulation of 5,150 copies, making it the fifth most widely circulated of the country's (then) six daily newspapers. However, due to its close ties to the Democratic Party, Luxembourg's third largest party and a regular coalition partner in government, the Journal's significance was much greater than this circulation would suggest.

The newspaper received €540,421 in annual state press subsidy in 2009.

The newspaper became independent from the Democratic Party (DP) in 2012 through a cooperation with Editpress and was no longer a party newspaper, but had an independent editorial board. It ceased its print publication on 31 December 2020 and became an Online magazine on 1 January 2021 with a focus on Slow journalism and all of its written articles published in German, French and English.
