= Luxembourgish Progressive Youth =

Defunct youth organization in Luxembourg

Luxembourgish Progressive Youth (French: Jeunesse progressiste luxembourgeoise, abbreviated JPL) was a youth organization in Luxembourg active from 1952 to 1977. It was the youth wing of the Communist Party of Luxembourg (KPL), and a member organization of the World Federation of Democratic Youth (WFDY).

== History ==
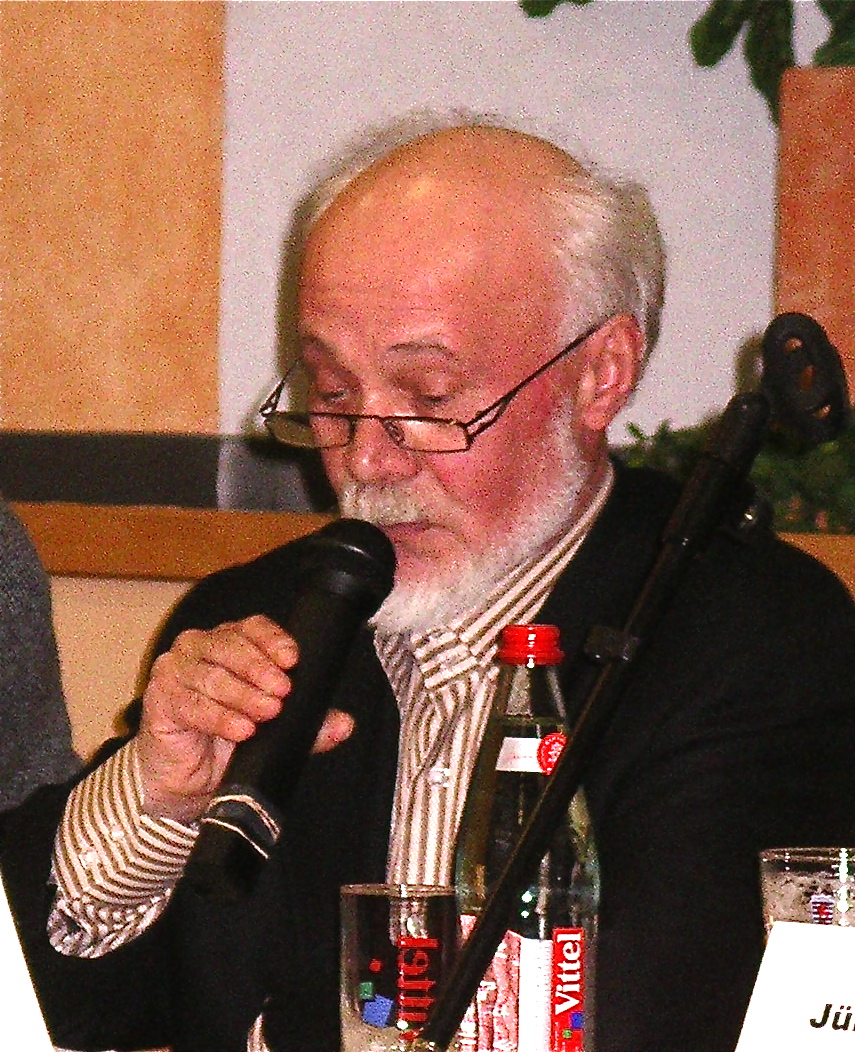
Future The Left founder André Hoffmann (pictured in 2008) was a member of the JPL.

The organization was founded at a meeting at Café du Commerce in 1952 under the name Luxembourg Youth Movement for Peace and Friendship, during the preparatory process ahead of the 4th World Festival of Youth and Students in Bucharest. The organization was commonly known as the Festival Youth (Festivaljugend). It was the youth wing of the Communist Party of Luxembourg (KPL).

The organization adopted the name Luxembourgish Progressive Youth in February 1967. As of the late 1960s, JPL had some 1,000 members. The organization membership included working youth and secondary school pupils. The highest decision-making body of JPL was the congress, at which the governing bodies are elected - a 19-member national committee and a seven-member secretariat. JPL published the monthly magazine Avant-garde. The Service de renseignement de l'État du Luxembourg (SREL, state intelligence agency) had infiltrators within the ranks of Festival Youth/JPL.

JPL advocated granting young people passive voting rights at the age of 18 years and active voting rights from the age of 21 years. It called for a shorter work-week, reductions in military spending, increase in appropriations for the social and cultural needs of young people, equal pay for equal work, the adoption of the Law on the Protection of Youth Labor, free distribution of educational materials, tax reductions, and free education in secondary and higher educational institutions. JPL campaigned for defense of national independence and sovereignty of Luxembourg, peaceful co-existence, disarmament, termination of military pacts (and Luxembourg withdrawing from NATO) and a peaceful solution to the German problem.

JPL was active in the Luxembourgish students movement. As of the late 1960s the chairman of the General Association of Luxembourgish Students (ASSOSS), André Hoffmann, was a JPL member.

JPL held its First Congress in Belvaux in January 1970. The congress outlined the tasks of the organization as the struggle for the abolishing of capitalist society and transition to socialism, the protection of the rights of youth, to propagate ideas of scientific communism among young people, and to fight against left-opportunist groups. Like its mother party KPL, JPL had an antagonistic relationship with the New Left movements emerging in the wake of May 68 - for example the JPL denounced CLAN-Independent Socialist Students, the publishers of D'Ro'd Wullmaus, as "nothing more than a sectarian clique of sad left-wing adventurers, incapable of developing a broad mass struggle, hostile to progressive forces and therefore – consciously or unconsciously – very useful to the bourgeoisie."

JPL was a member of the World Federation of Democratic Youth (WFDY). It had cooperation with the All-Union Leninist Young Communist League (VLKSM) of the Soviet Union. JPL was an active participant in the Vietnam solidarity movement, for example participating in the 'Million for Vietnam' campaign. JPL was active in solidarity campaigns supporting the struggle for democracy in Greece, Spain and Portugal. At the initiative of the JPL, an international meeting was convened in Luxembourg in October 1972 under the banner "Unity of the Left!". It was organized jointly by JPL and the Socialist Youth of Luxembourg (JSL). Representatives from socialist and communist youth organizations from Belgium, France, Italy, Scandinavian countries and West Germany participated in the event.

Since 1973 the JPL is no longer active. In 1975 young members of the KPL were organized in a Pupils Group of the KPL. In 1977 the Luxembourgish Communist Youth (JCL) was founded.
