= Mary Faltz =

Luxembourgish human rights' advocate

- Born: June 7, 1983. United Arab Emirates
- Occupations: Clinical researcher, pharmacist, author, children's rights advocate
- Employer: Luxembourg Ministry of Education
- Known for: Survivor advocacy, trauma-informed education, public speaking
- Notable work: Cruelly Betrayed (2021), My Father (2023), Match Aligned! (2026)
- Website: Official website

Mary Faltz is a clinical researcher, pharmacist, author, and advocate for children's rights from Luxembourg. She has contributed to public discussions on child protection and trauma-informed care, drawing on personal experience to inform her advocacy work.

== Early life and education ==
Faltz was born in the United Arab Emirates and moved to Luxembourg at the age of four. She is one of six siblings. She pursued higher education in Brighton, United Kingdom, studying pharmacy and clinical research.

== Career and public engagement ==
Faltz published her first book, Cruelly Betrayed in 2021, while undergoing cancer treatment. The memoir details her personal experience with prolonged childhood abuse and the legal process that preceded her father's conviction.

That same year, she delivered a TEDx talk addressing personal trauma and advocacy efforts.

In 2023, she published her second book, My Father, which discusses challenges within Luxembourg's child welfare system and the psychological effect of childhood trauma. The book advocates for policy changes and increased support for survivors.

Since 2022, Faltz has worked for Luxembourg's Ministry of Education, where she has contributed to initiatives focused on children's well-being.

Faltz has been featured in national and international media, including RTL, Paperjam, UK Health Radio, LAND, WORT, L'Essentiel and was profiled on the cover of Femmes magazine in 2024 for her work in education, survivor advocacy, and public speaking.

== Personal life ==
Faltz is a single mother to four children. She continues to be active in public education and advocacy related to child protection and mental health.
