= Correio =

Defunct Portuguese-language newspaper from Luxembourg

- Founder: Editpress
- Language: Portuguese
- Circulation: 6,000 (2004)
- Website: www.correio.lu/

Correio (Portuguese pronunciation: [kuˈʁɐju], lit. 'Post') was a Portuguese-language newspaper published in Luxembourg. It was published by Editpress.
