= Head of a Clown =

Painting by Joseph Kutter

- Tête de Clown (French)
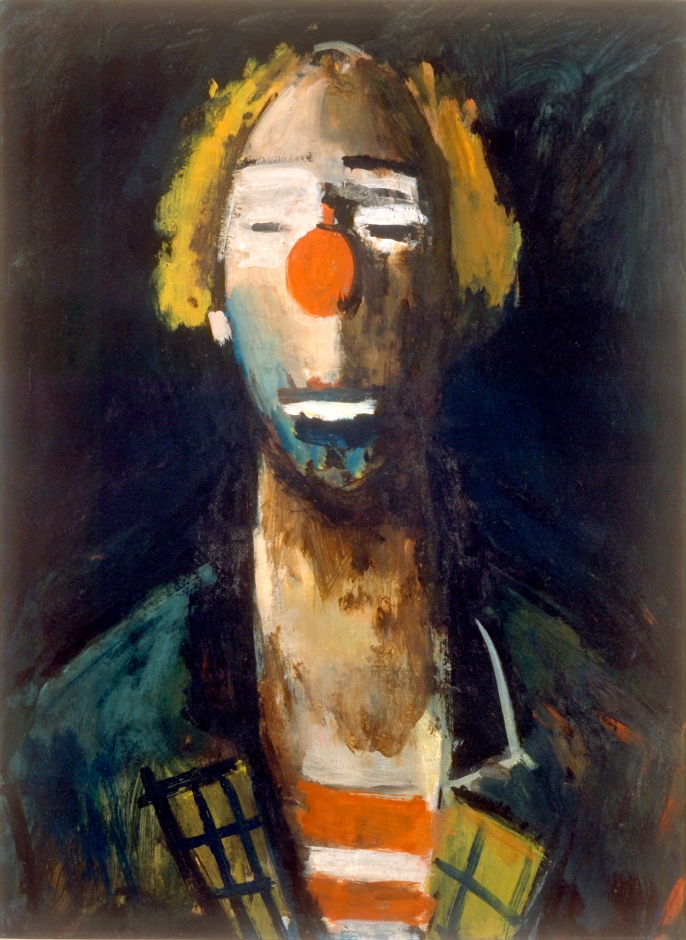
- Artist: Joseph Kutter
- Year: 1937
- Medium: oil on canvas
- Dimensions: 62.7 cm × 45.8 cm (24.7 in × 18.0 in)
- Location: National Museum of History and Art; Luxembourg

Head of a Clown (in French: Tête de Clown) is a painting by Luxembourg artist Joseph Kutter from about 1937.

== Description ==
The 62.7 x 45.8 cm. picture is part of the collection of the National Museum of History and Art in Luxembourg.

== Analysis ==
One of the most famous artists of Luxembourg in the first half of the 20th century was expressionist Joseph Kutter. From 1927, he is one of the significant names of the Luxembourg Secession. Human figures are central to his work and through them he expresses humanity and himself. He's able to combine different artistic influences of his time. Clowns appear in his works in 1935, as a result of their participation in the variety show in Luxembourg. Initially, his characters have a cheerful character, but after 1936–1937, he began to paint a series of clowns expressing worry and suffering. This was due to the painter's serious illness.
