= Courrier du Grand-Duché de Luxembourg =

Former Luxembourgish newspaper

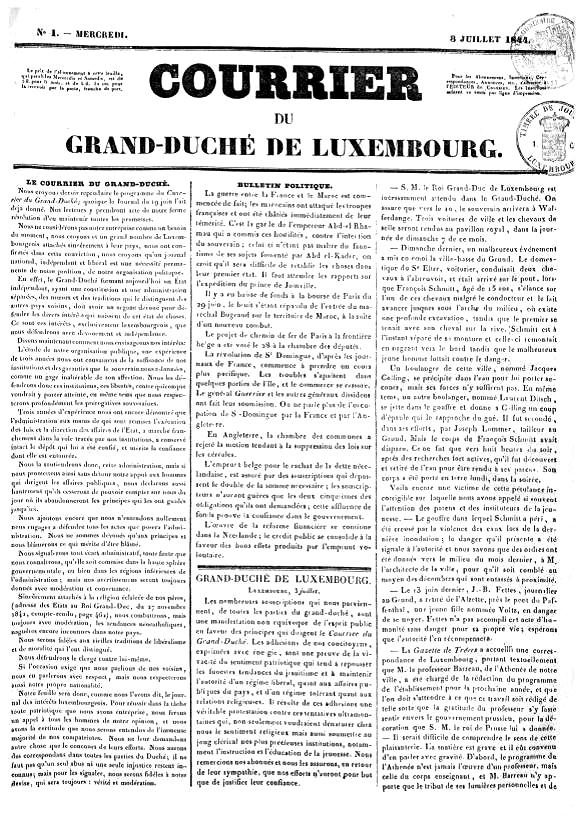
- The first edition, 3 July 1844
- Type: Daily newspaper
- Owner(s): Charles Metz, Norbert Metz
- Editor-in-chief: Mathieu-Lambert Schrobilgen
- Founded: 3 July 1844
- Language: French
- Ceased publication: 27 December 1868

The Courrier du Grand-Duché de Luxembourg was a French-language newspaper in Luxembourg published from 1844 to 1868.

On 3 July 1844, the Luxembourg printer Lamort released the inaugural edition of the Courrier du Grand-Duché de Luxembourg. Just three days previously, on 29 June 1844, he had discontinued the publication of the pro-government Journal de la Ville et du Grand-Duché de Luxembourg. For the Courrier, he even retained the same banner font as the Journal without alteration.

While the newspaper maintained its visual continuity from the Journal, there was a shift in its political orientation. Emphasising the autonomy of the state, administration, and customs as distinguishing factors for Luxembourg from its neighbors, the Courrier asserted the need for an organ to defend the country's interests. The Courrier saw itself as more sensitive to the needs of an independent Luxembourg, and closer to the people. However, since it was written in French, it still addressed itself to a relatively educated readership. Departing from the unpopular Orangist stance of its predecessor, the Journal de la Ville et du Grand-Duché de Luxembourg, the Courrier became the voice of industrial capital. Consequently, it played a significant role as a democratic newspaper during the 1848 Revolution, addressing the emerging "social question," that is, the concerns of the first industrial workers.

Before announcing the abolition of censorship on 18 March 1848, a topic openly criticized by editor Hoffmann in preceding months, the Courrier had consistently voiced its discontent with the Estates-General's indifference and the government's inaction on social deprivation. The newspaper featured articles on the escalating poverty, drawing parallels with the Irish famine, discussions on beggars, and the soaring costs of food staples. Special attention was given to the 1848 Paris Revolution, with detailed reports and comprehensive coverage of the sessions of the Estates-General during the 1848 Revolution in Luxembourg.

Owned by factory owner and politician Norbert Metz, who collaborated with his brother, lawyer, and factory owner Charles Metz, the Courrier underwent staffing changes in 1846. The newspaper announced the departure of Schrobilgen, the Journal writer, on 10 January of that year. Victor Hoffman served as the publisher, and the printing was initially done by the Lamort printing house, later taken over by Victor Bück until the Metz brothers established their printing house for the Courrier.

The early period of the Courrier was marked by the vigorous struggle against the Catholic newspaper, the Luxemburger Zeitung, founded in May 1844. In this matter the Courrier was supported by the Diekircher Wochenblatt.

Under the Restoration government (established in 1853) and after the 1856 coup d’État, which reintroduced press censorship, the Courrier transformed into an opposition newspaper. It criticized both the clergy and the government's "barons," vehemently opposing the policies of Apostolic Vicar Jean-Théodore Laurent.

Each edition typically began with a political bulletin summarising the international situation, followed by commentaries, correspondences, and news related to the Grand-Duchy. The arts section occupied the bottom third of the front page, featuring diverse content such as multi-part narratives, travel accounts, local history articles, and rare poems. International news was often sourced from foreign newspapers, and the fourth page was dedicated to advertisements.

Originally appearing on Wednesdays and Saturdays in 4 pages with 3 columns, the Courrier was accompanied by a 2 to 4-page supplement during periods of heightened political activity. The postal subscription cost 5 florins per semester. After January 1856, it appeared on Thursdays and Sundays, followed by a shift to Wednesdays, Fridays, and Sundays after January 1857. On 1 January 1860, it became the sole daily newspaper and adopted a large folio format in July, with pages divided into four columns. Described as an evening newspaper, it then cost 5,50 francs for a trimester's subscription and 7 francs for a subscription outside the fortress. The final preserved edition dates back to 20 December 1868, after its publishers established a new daily German newspaper, the Luxemburger Zeitung (unrelated to the previous paper of that name).
