= Salon de la Sécession =

Avant-gardist art exhibition held in Luxembourg from 1927 to 1930

The Salon de la Sécession was an Avant-gardist art exhibition which was held in Luxembourg each year from 1927 to 1930. It was the main event of the Luxembourg Secession movement which had been founded in 1926 by a number of artists including Claus Cito, Nico Klopp, Joseph Kutter and Auguste Trémont and Harry Rabinger who were unhappy with the academic approach of the Cercle artistique de Luxembourg and its support of Impressionism. Hoping to develop interest in Fauvism and Expressionism, they had been inspired by similar but substantially earlier secessionist movements in Munich (1892), Vienna (1896) and Berlin (1897). The Luxembourg movement folded in 1930 following the reconciliation of the Secession movement and the Cercle artistique.

The Salon's first exhibition was held in Luxembourg's city hall in 1927. The participating artists were Claus Cito, Nico Klopp, Joseph Kutter, Jemp Michels, Harry Rabinger, Jean Schaak, Jos Sünnen, Jean-Joseph Thiry and Auguste Trémont.
