= Goosch.lu =

Weekly News Paper

- Type: Weekly newspaper
- Language: Luxembourgish
- Website: http://www.goosch.lu/

Goosch.lu is a weekly newspaper published in Luxembourg which is sent electronically or in paper form on a Thursday and is also readable on the Internet. The newspaper says it has 3,500 electronic subscribers. A few hundred copies are printed every week. Goosch.lu is only written by volunteers.

It was first published on June 27, 2003. Since February, 2009, Goosch.lu uses a new layout.

== See also ==
- List of newspapers in Luxembourg
