= Gëlle Fra =

War memorial in Luxembourg City

Coordinates: 49°36′34″N 06°07′44″E

The Gëlle Fra monument commemorates the thousands of Luxembourgers that volunteered for service in the armed forces of the Allied Powers during the First World War.

The Monument of Remembrance (French: Monument du souvenir), usually known by the nickname of the Gëlle Fra (Luxembourgish for 'Golden Lady'), is a war memorial in Luxembourg City. It is dedicated to the thousands of Luxembourgers who volunteered for service in the armed forces of the Allied Powers during both World Wars and the Korean War as well as the Luxembourgers who volunteered in the International Brigades during the Spanish Civil War.

The Gëlle Fra is situated on Place de la Constitution, in the Ville Haute district of central Luxembourg City.

== Description ==
The centrepiece of the monument is a 21-metre-tall granite obelisk. Atop the obelisk stands a gilded bronze statue representing Nike, the Greek goddess of victory, or "Queen of Freedom" (Friddenskinnigin in Luxembourgish), holding out a laurel wreath as if placing it upon the head of the nation. At the foot of the obelisk are two (ungilded) bronze figures, representing those Luxembourgish soldiers that volunteered to serve for France; one lies at the base of the statue, having died in service of his country, whilst the other sits, mourning his dead compatriot.

The sculptor of the three bronze figures was Claus Cito, a native Luxembourger. The model for the Gëlle Fra is unknown. The monument was inaugurated in 1923.

The statue of a lady at the top of the monument

The inscriptions at the base of the monument include one in French, over the name of Foch, Marshal of France, Commander-in-Chief of Allied Forces, that honours the Luxembourgeois soldiers who took part in the 1914–18 war, on the battlefields of the Marne, the Aisne and the Somme, and in Artois, Champagne and at Verdun.

== History ==
=== First World War ===
Gëlle Fra, viewed from left profile

During the First World War, Luxembourg pledged itself to neutrality, but was occupied by Germany, which justified its actions by citing military necessity. However, most Luxembourgers did not believe Germany's good intentions, fearing that Germany would annex their country in the event of a German victory; these claims were substantiated by the Septemberprogramm authorized by German Chancellor Theobald von Bethmann Hollweg.

Although Luxembourgers left under German occupation at home could do little to aid the Allies, those overseas, outside Germany's control, could volunteer to serve against Germany. In total, 3,700 Luxembourgish nationals served in the French army, of whom, 2,000 died. As Luxembourg's pre-war population was only 266,000, this death toll amounted to more than 1% of the entire national population, which is a relatively greater percentage than many combatant nations (see: World War I casualties).

The monument aroused public controversy at the time it was proposed and installed. Opposition had come from the conservative Catholic majority of citizens, and at the inauguration ceremony Grand Duchess Charlotte and the Bishop of Luxembourg were absent.

=== World War II and after ===
Warrior seated beside corpse of another, with inscription, at base of "Gëlle Fra" war memorial obelisk supporting Nike (mythology)

When Luxembourg was occupied by Nazi forces in World War II, the Germans dismantled the memorial on 21 October 1940. Several portions of the memorial were rescued, and after the war, the monument was partially restored. The Gëlle Fra herself however remained unaccounted for until January 1980 when she was found hidden beneath the main stand of the national football stadium. Later additions were made to honor Luxembourger forces who had served in World War II and the Korean War.

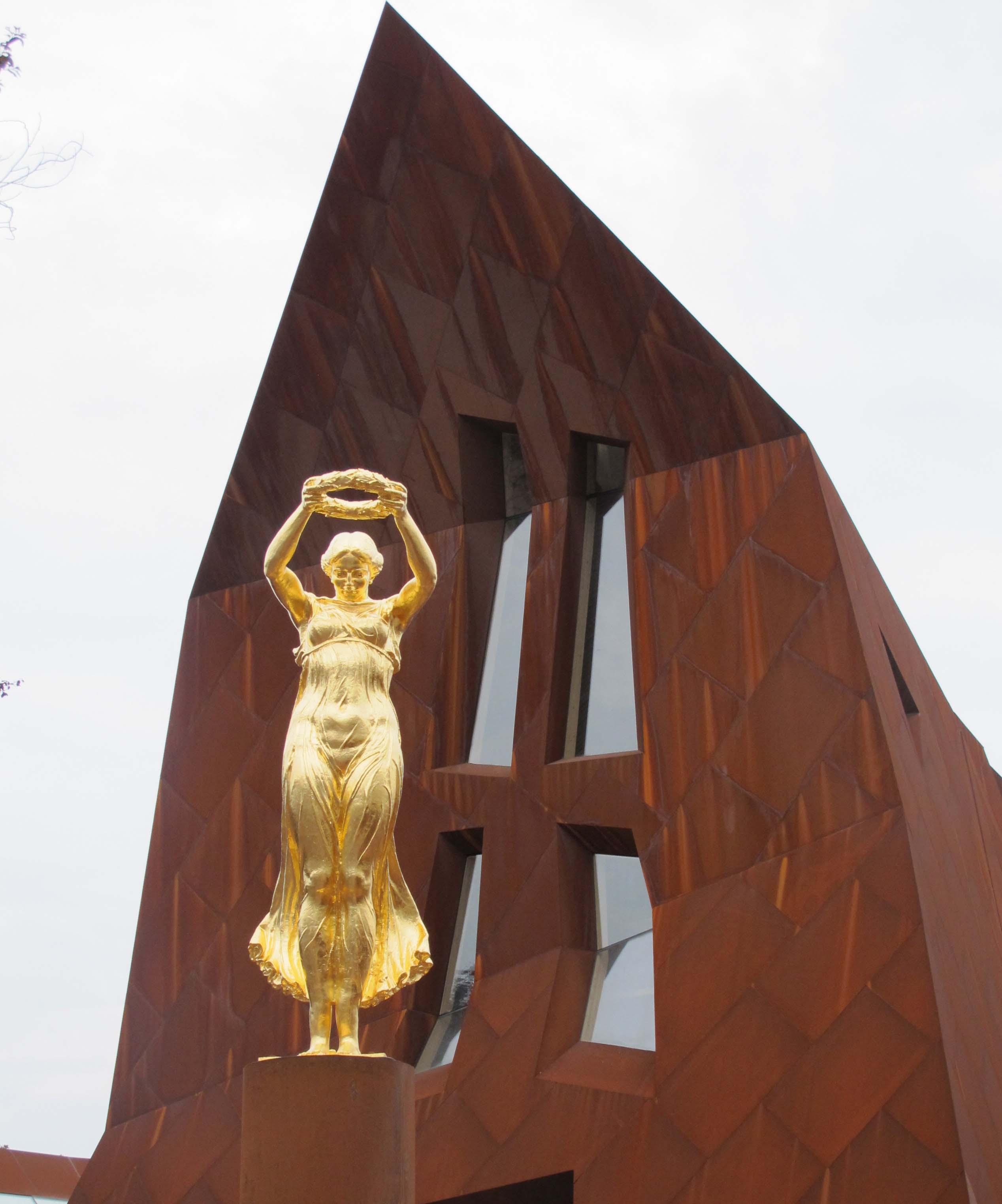
"Gëlle Fra" at Expo 2010, Shanghai

The monument was not fully reconstructed and restored to its original design until 1984 and then finally unveiled to the public in the presence of Grand Duke Jean on 23 June 1985, Luxembourg's national holiday.

The statue of the gilded lady was removed from the obelisk and exhibited at the entrance of the Luxembourg pavilion of the Expo 2010 world exhibition in Shanghai.

== "Gëlle Fra 2" ==
In 2001, a controversial version of the monument, showing the statue as visibly pregnant and with a different inscription, was created by Sanja Iveković and erected nearby. Named as "Lady Rosa of Luxembourg", it is now in the New York City Museum of Modern Art.

== Gallery ==
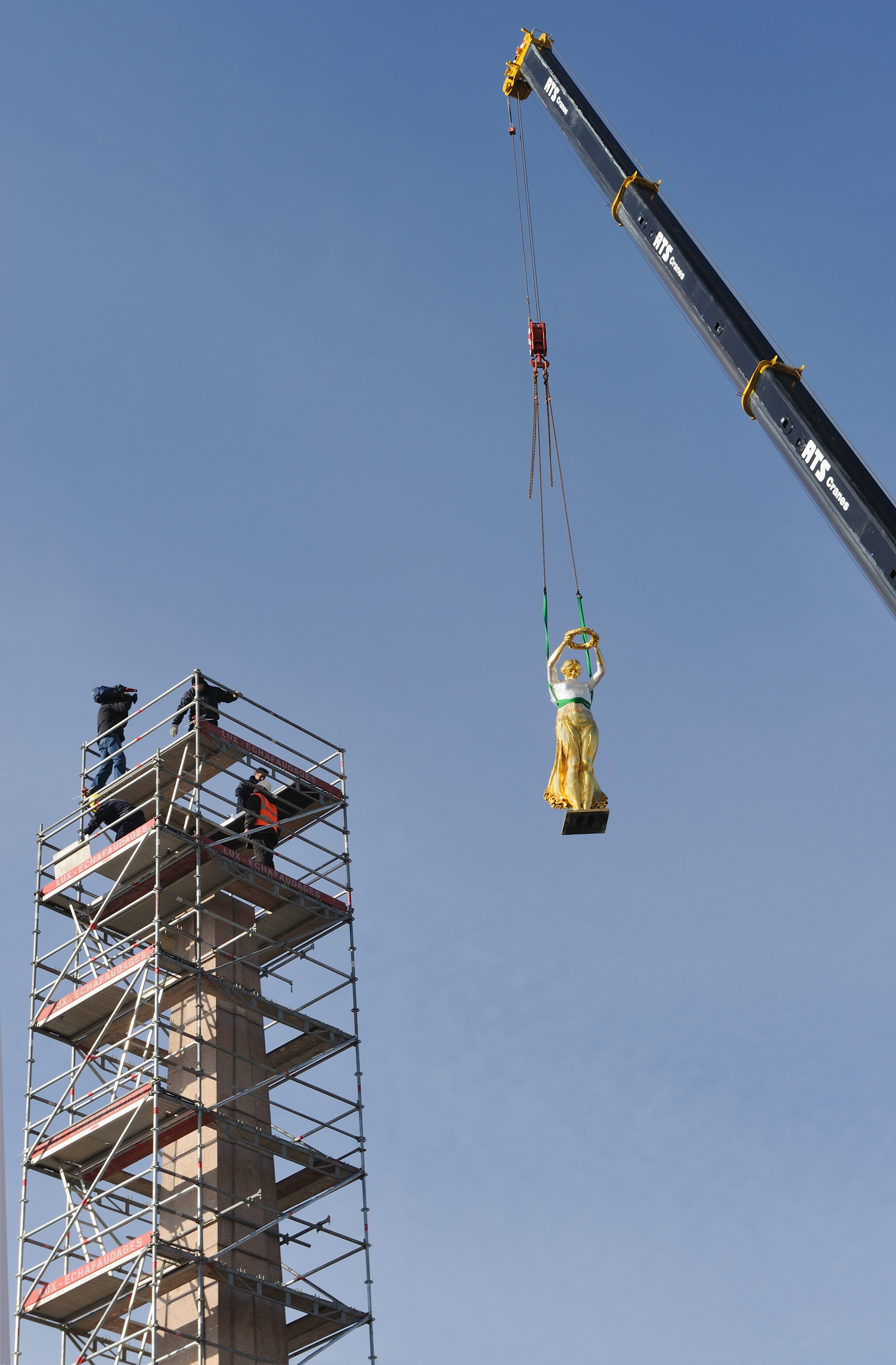
Gëlle Fra lowered by crane from the obelisk, March 2010, for removal to Expo 2010, Shanghai

Gëlle Fra removed from the obelisk, for Luxembourg pavilion at the Expo 2010, Shanghai

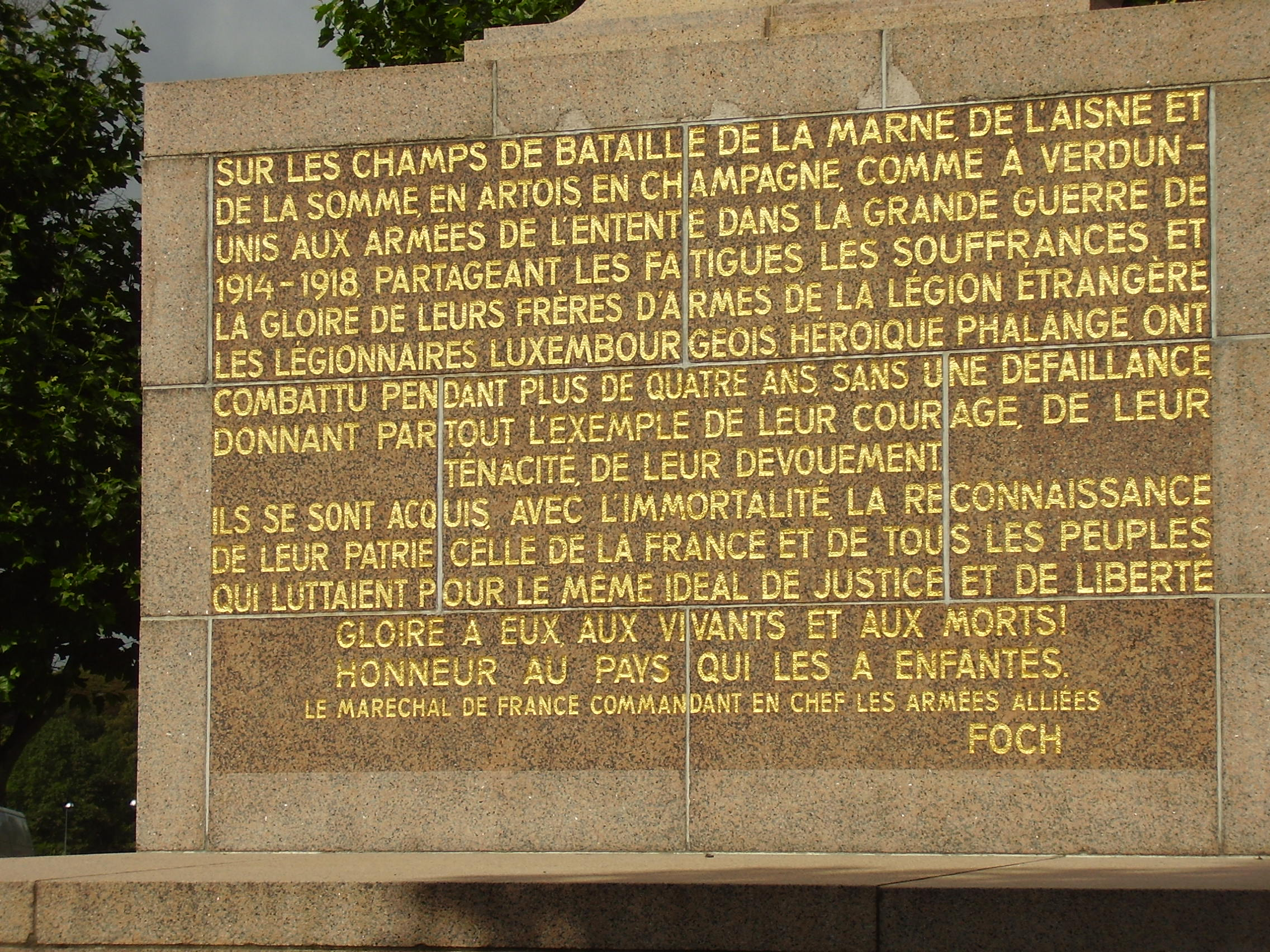
One of the inscriptions on the side of the memorial

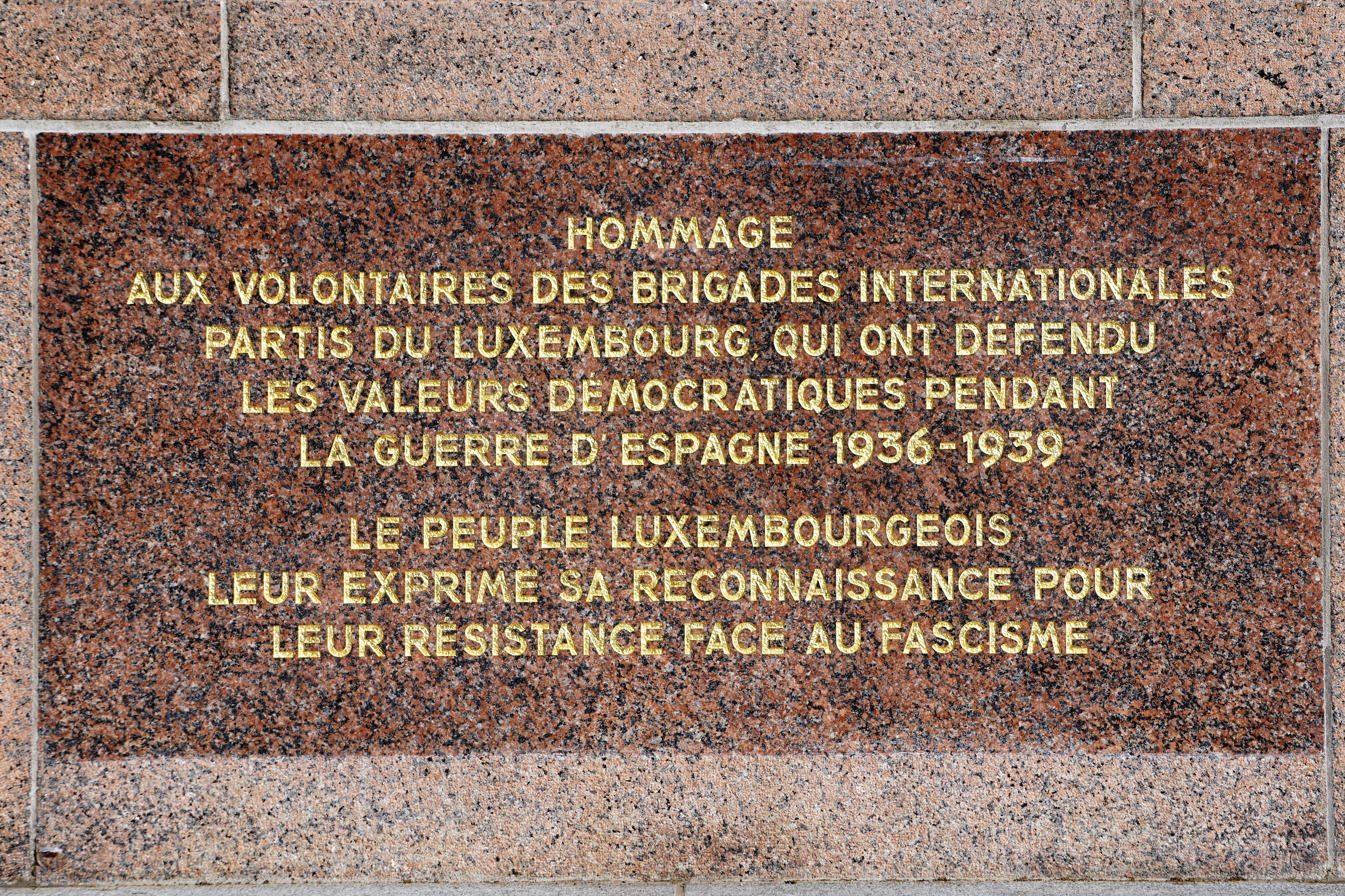
Plaque Spueniekämpfer – Brigadas Internacionales (101)

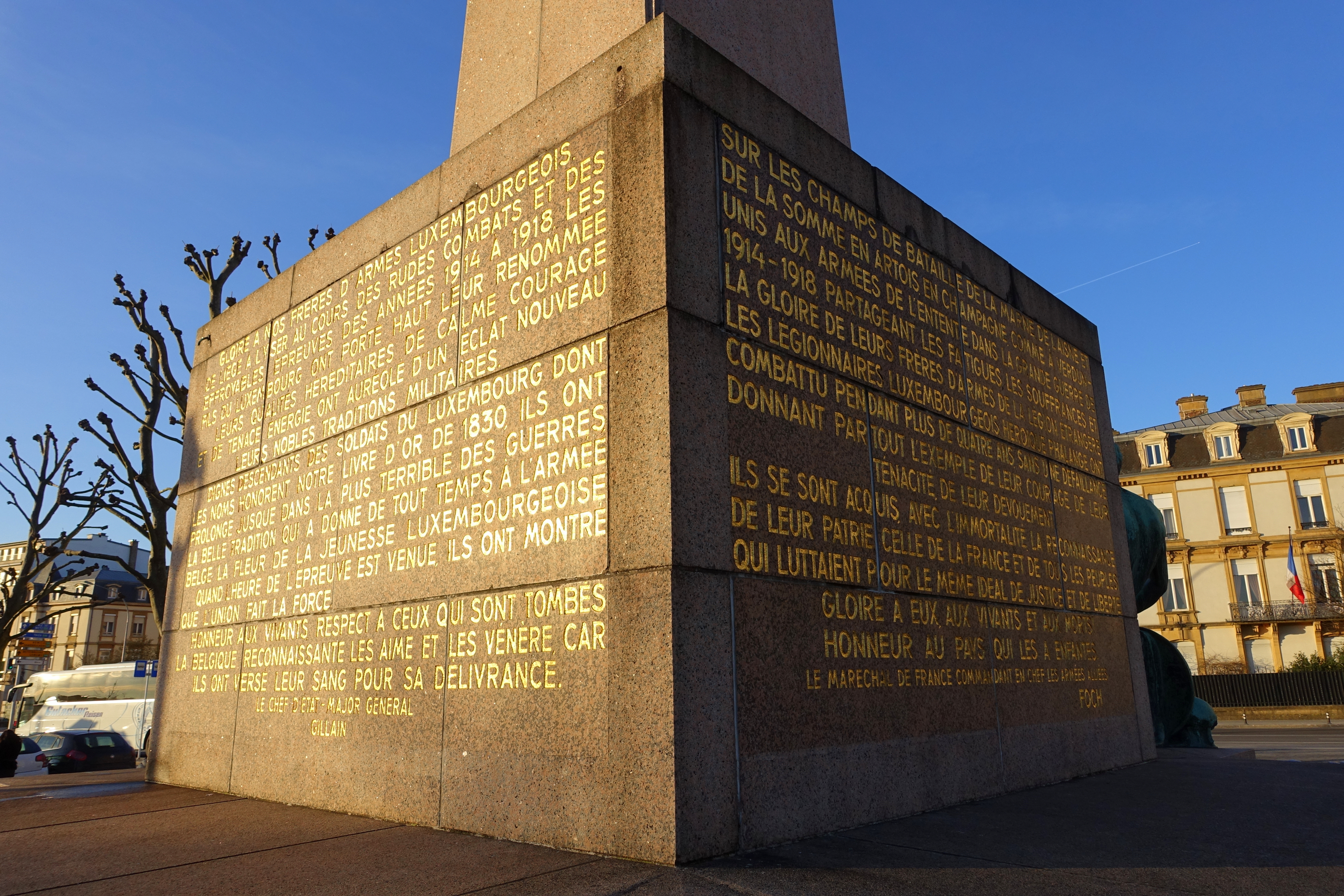
Inscriptions - Monument du souvenir Gëlle Fra - Luxembourg City - DSC06103

== Bibliography ==
- Beck, Henri; Baltzer, Bruno (April 1999). "Le Monument du Souvenir érigé sur l'emplacement d'un vieux bastion" (PDF). Ons Stad (in French). No. 60. p. 2-7.
- Braun, Josy (April 1999). ""Méng" Gëlle Fra..." (PDF). Ons Stad (in Luxembourgish). No. 60. p. 28-29.
- Braun-Beck, Lotty (April 1999). "Claus Cito, der Bildhauer aus Bascharage (1882-1965)" (PDF). Ons Stad (in German). No. 60. p. 22-27.
- Clesse, René (April 1999). "Die Geschichte eines Monuments im Spiegel der Presse" (PDF). Ons Stad (in German). No. 60. p. 19-21.
- Dostert, Paul (April 1999). "Die Zerstörung der Gëlle Fra am 21. Oktober 1940" (PDF). Ons Stad (in German). No. 60. p. 16-18.

- Media related to Gëlle Fra at Wikimedia Commons
