= Obermosel-Zeitung =

Former Luxembourgish newspaper

- Logo used until 1884
- Founded: 2 July 1881
- Ceased publication: 3 April 1948
- Language: German

The Obermosel-Zeitung (German pronunciation: [ˈoːbɐˌmoːzl̩ ˈtsaɪtʊŋ]; transl. "Upper Moselle Newspaper") was a German-language newspaper published in Luxembourg between 1881 and 1948. In 1948, it merged into the Lëtzebuerger Journal.

The Trier printer Josef Eßlen often read the two main party newspapers of Luxembourg City, the Catholic Luxemburger Wort and the liberal Luxemburger Zeitung, and decided that there was a market for a third newspaper. As a foreigner, he did not dare establish himself in the capital, and therefore set up business in a border town, close to Germany. He had initially considered Remich, but finally decided on Grevenmacher. The first edition of the Obermosel-Zeitung appeared on 2 July 1881.

Eßlen was not involved in the major political debates of Luxembourg, and tried to create an apolitical mass-market newspaper. He emphasised local news, and filled the paper with all the village gossip that he heard. This was an often profitable strategy for newspapers in other countries, but which many cultured readers viewed disdainfully as an example of modern press decadence.

As a foreigner, Eßlen lacked personal contacts, and went about constructing a network of local correspondents paid by the paragraph, who were to bring him the news as quickly as possible, whether highly important or quite trivial, from all the regions of the country as well as villages across the border.

According to Eßlen, the paper initially had 200 subscribers, who paid 1,30 francs. By 1884, circulation had reached 10,000 copies (again according to Eßlen) and before the turn of the century, it was the most widely-distributed newspaper in the country. When it lost this spot again to competitors, it claimed ambiguously to be Luxembourg's "biggest" newspaper, since its format of 64,5 x 49 cm made it one of the physically largest periodicals in the country's history.

The Obermosel-Zeitung tried to meet the new needs of its readers. It increasingly published serials and entertaining articles. As a daily newspaper, like its competitors it offered a Sunday supplement as well as serialised novels in a format twice as small as the newspaper, which could be detached, folded and collected. On the other hand, its ambitions to expand in the economically booming South of Luxembourg failed with the newspaper Escher Nachrichten. Sonderausgabe der Obermosel-Zeitung für den Kanton Esch und nächste Umgebung ("Esch News. Special edition of the Obermosel-Zeitung for the canton of Esch and surrounding areas").

Initially it appeared once per week on Saturdays; after six months, it started appearing on Wednesdays and Saturdays, later three times a week and finally, from 1923, daily. The Obermosel-Zeitung appeared up until the period immediately after World War II and the liberation. Its last issue was on 3 April 1948, after which it merged with D'Unio’n to form the Letzeburger Journal.
