= Claus Cito =

Luxembourgish sculptor

Gëlle Fra

Nicolas Joseph 'Claus' Cito (26 May 1882 – 10 October 1965) was a Luxembourgish sculptor educated at the Académie Royale des Beaux-Arts in Brussels.

He is most notable for having created the original Gëlle Fra war memorial, though his work can also be found at the Notre-Dame Cathedral, Luxembourg. Along with Emile Hulten and Charles Kohl, he worked on the bas-reliefs of the National Resistance Museum in Esch-sur-Alzette, Luxembourg.

In 1909, Cito shared the coveted Prix Grand-duc Adolphe with the sculptor Jean-Baptiste Wercollier.

Cito was a cofounder of the Luxembourg secession movement in 1926, which promoted Expressionism. He exhibited at the first salon in 1927.
