= Harry Rabinger =

Harry Rabinger (1895–1966) was a Luxembourgish artist who is remembered for his portraits and Expressionist landscape paintings, especially those of the industrial area in the south of the country.

== Biography ==
Born in the Pfaffenthal district of Luxembourg City on 25 February 1895, Rabinger started his art studies in Paris but was forced to go to Munich when war broke out in 1914. He completed his education by travelling widely, in particular to Hungary, Austria, Czechoslovakia and the Netherlands. It was in 1919 that he came into contact with the south of Luxembourg as an art teacher at the Ecole Industrielle et Commerciale and at the Lycée des Jeunes Filles in Esch-sur-Alzette. At the time, industry was expanding rapidly in the area, providing him with vivid scenes of mines, factories, railways and buildings caked in rusty red coatings.

Although he first became a member of the Cercle artistique de Luxembourg, he joined Joseph Kutter, Nico Klopp and others as a co-founder of the Luxembourg secession movement which succeeded in promoting modern art. After exhibiting his work both in Luxembourg and Brussels, he was charged by the State to paint his monumental work "Terres Rouges" (Red Lands) for the Luxembourg pavilion at the 1937 World Exhibition in Paris. In 1939, together with Jean Schaak, he exhibited large decorative panels at the New York fair where he won an award for his "Ville de Luxembourg". After the war, he went through a difficult period, limiting himself to teaching. He died on 7 September 1966 at his home in Limpertsberg.

== Style ==
Rabinger's work varies from brightly coloured still lifes to startlingly realistic nudes and portraits, including his famous women with boyish hairdos. Above all, he is remembered for his landscapes of the wilds of Normandy and Brittany with rocks, cliffs and rugged coastlines. But he also painted the quieter villages and valleys of the Moselle and the Alzette and the mountains up in the Oesling. As a young artist, he was first influenced by Impressionism but soon developed an Expressionist somewhat Fauvist style with intense colouring and strong contrasts.
