= Der Kampf =

- Type: Weekly newspaper
- Founded: 1920
- Ceased publication: 1922
- Political alignment: Communist Party of Luxembourg
- Language: German

Der Kampf (English: The Struggle) was a weekly newspaper published in Luxembourg by the Communist Party of Luxembourg between 1920 and 1922.

The newspapers had various subheadings over time, from Wochenschrift der Kommunisten Luxemburgs ("Weekly journal of the Communists of Luxembourg") in the first edition, to later Organ der Kommunistischen Partei Luxemburgs (Sektion der 3. Internationale) ("Organ of the Communist Party of Luxembourg [Part of the 3rd International]") in the 8th edition.

The first edition appeared on 18 November 1920. From 3 April 1921, the paper had a supplement, Der kommunistische Gewerkschaftler ("The communist trade unionist").

Due to the Communist Party's poor finances, the newspaper was shut down in 1922.

== See also ==
- List of newspapers in Luxembourg
