= Ardenner express =

- Publisher: Sully Prud'homme
- Language: Luxembourgish
- Headquarters: 2, rue Christophe Plantin, Luxembourg City, Luxembourg

Ardenner express is a newspaper published in Luxembourg.

The director of the newspaper, which is printed by Groupe Saint-Paul Luxembourg, is Sully Prud'homme.
