= Nico Klopp =

Luxembourgish painter

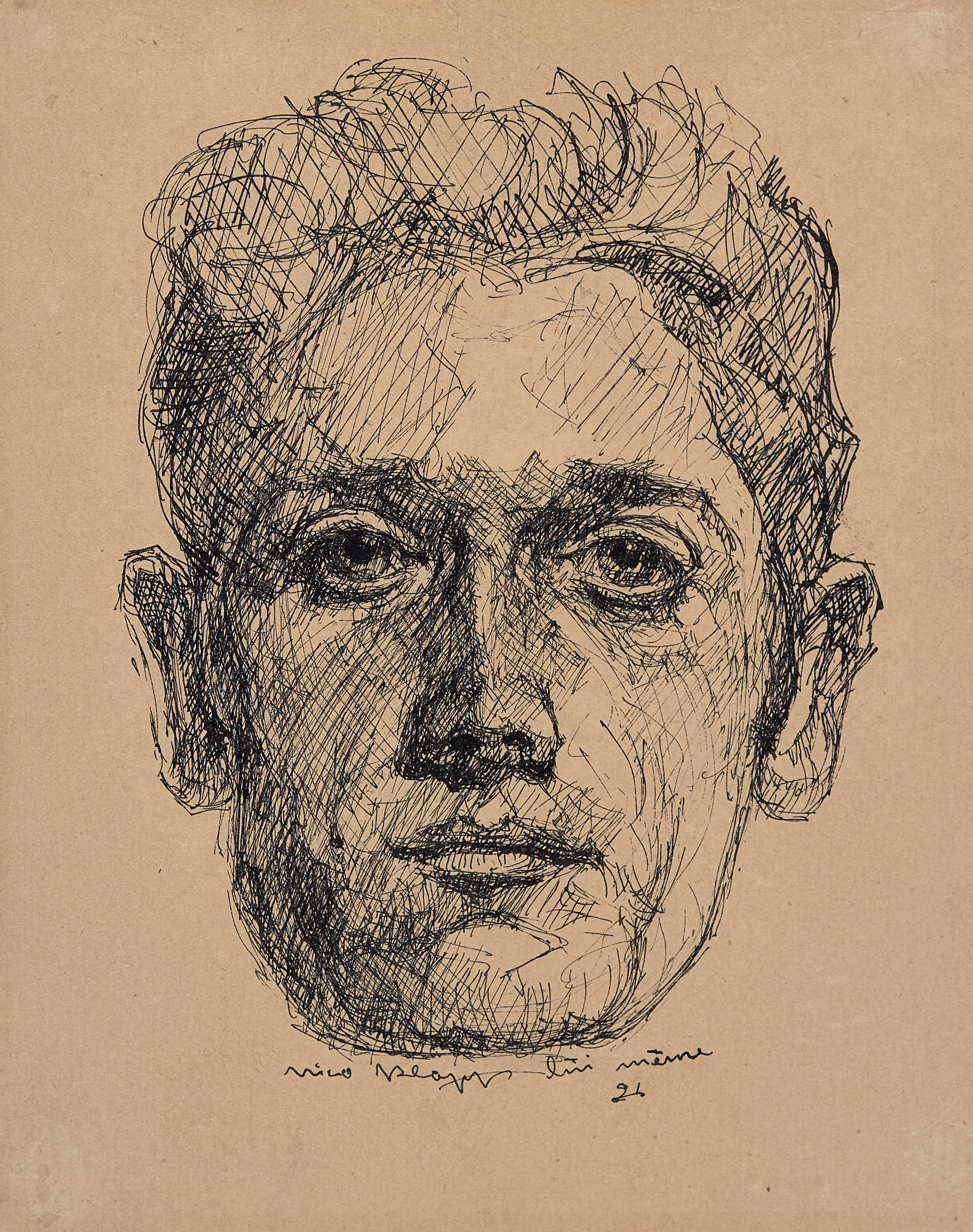
Nico Klopp lui-même (1926)

Nico Klopp (1894–1930) was a Luxembourgish painter remembered above all for his post-impressionist paintings of scenes on the Moselle river where he lived.

== Early life ==
Born on 18 September 1894 at Bech-Kleinmacher on the Moselle in south-eastern Luxembourg, Klopp attended the Arts and Crafts School in Luxembourg City before studying art in Cologne (1916–1918) and Weimar (1919–1920). There he discovered not only a love for painting, but also a predilection for print-making using woodcut and linocut techniques especially.

== Career ==
In the mid-1920s, he was among those who reacted not just against the trends of the 19th century but also against the impressionists, inspired by artists such as Vincent van Gogh and Paul Cézanne. Together with Joseph Kutter and a group of other Luxembourg artists such as Claus Cito and Harry Rabinger, he therefore broke away from the Cercle artistique de Luxembourg and became a co-founder of the Salon de la Sécession in 1927, inspired by secessionist developments in Munich, Vienna and Berlin.

Klopp lived in Remich where he painted many pictures of the bridge over the Moselle. Both his landscapes and his still lifes are distinctive in their bright colouring and their solid strokes which clearly bring out the main subjects. He exhibited his works at many salons and exhibitions in Luxembourg, Trier, Nancy, Bruges, and Echternach. He died in Luxembourg City on 29 December 1930 when he was only 36.

== Gallery ==
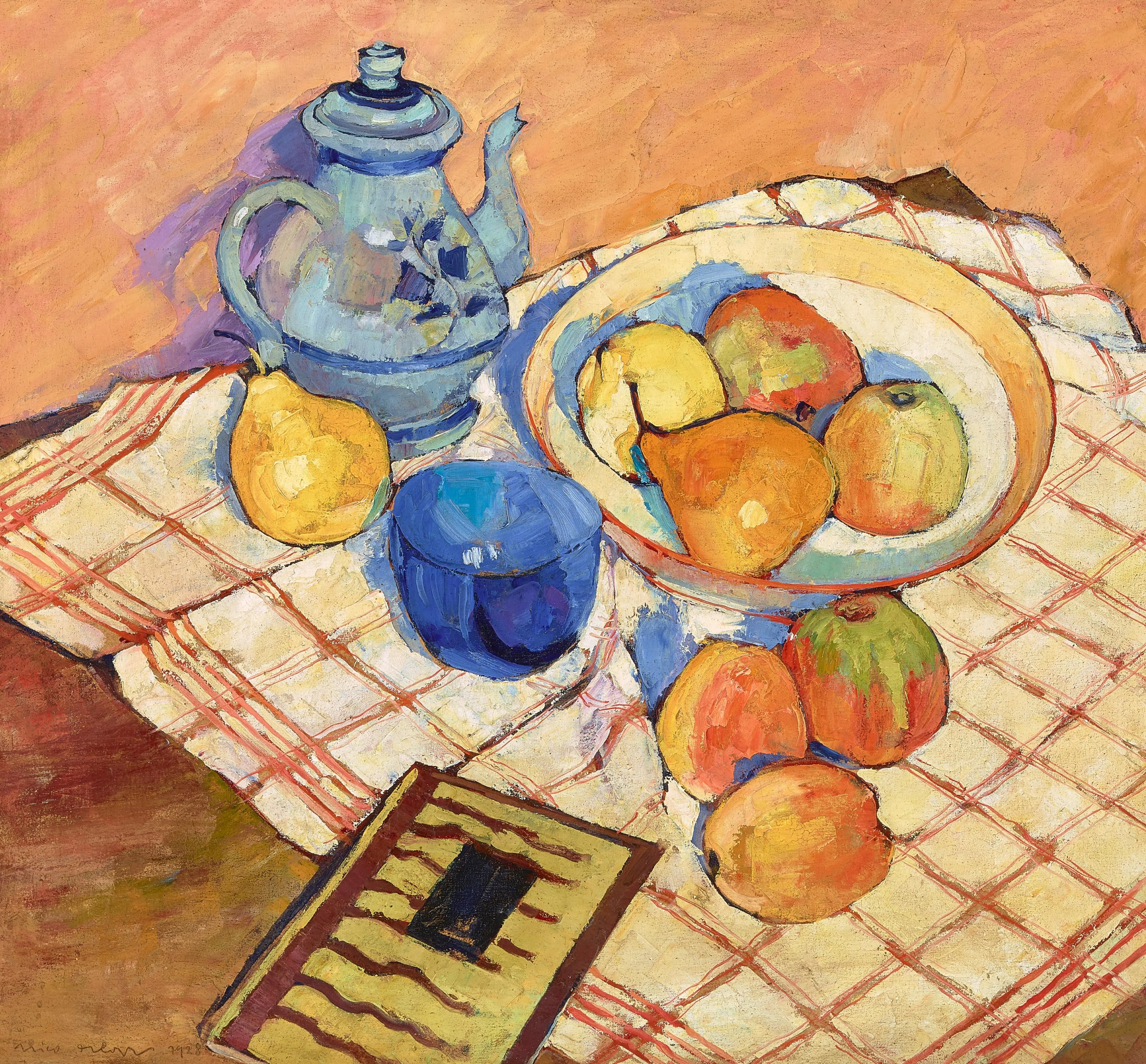
Nico Klopp: Still Life with Pears and Apples (1930)

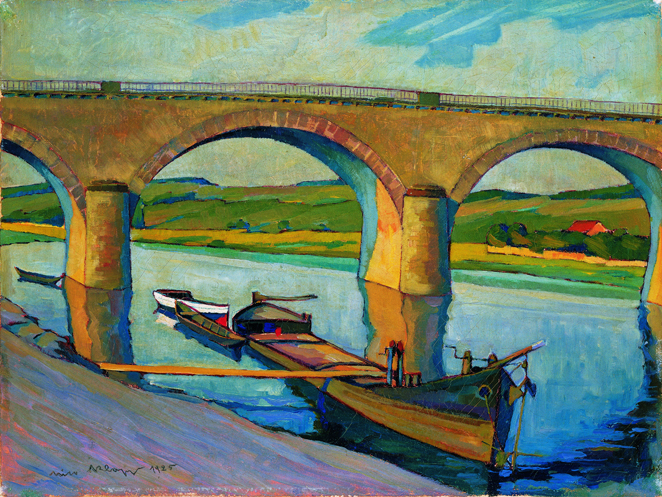
Nico Klopp: The Bridge in Remich (1925)

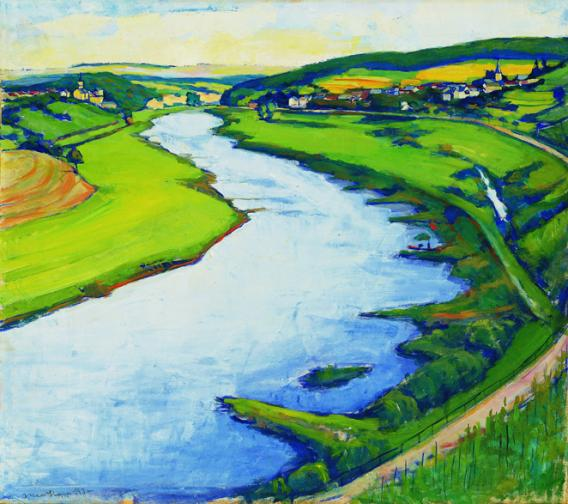
Nico Klopp: Moselle Landscape (Stadtbredimus, Palzem) (1930)

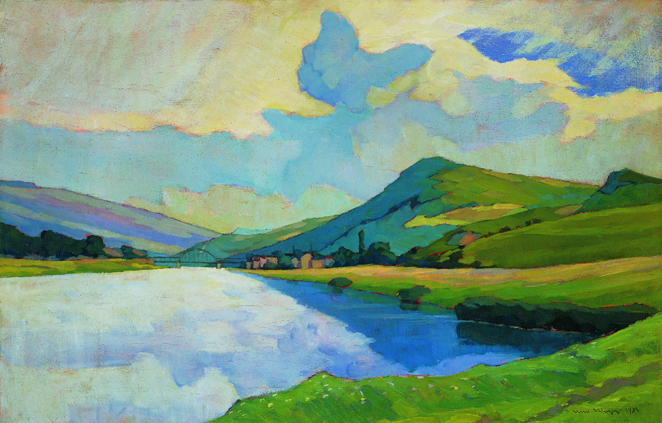
Nico Klopp: The Moselle near Schengen (1924)

== Bibliography ==
- "Nico Klopp (1894–1930)", Musée d'Histoire et d'Art, Editions Gérard Klopp, Luxembourg, 216 pp. ISBN 2-906535-85-0.
