= Le Quotidien (Luxembourg) =

Daily newspaper published in Luxembourg

- Type: Daily newspaper
- Format: Berliner
- Owners: Editpress; Lumedia
- Publisher: Lumedia
- Founded: 2001; 25 years ago
- Political alignment: Left-liberal
- Language: French
- Headquarters: Esch-sur-Alzette
- Sister newspapers: Le Jeudi; Tageblatt
- Website: Le Quotidien

Le Quotidien (French pronunciation: [lə kɔtidjɛ̃]; lit. The Daily) is a daily newspaper published in Esch-sur-Alzette, Luxembourg. It has been in circulation since 2001.

== History and profile ==
Le Quotidien, a French language newspaper, was established in November 2001. The paper is the successor of the Luxembourg edition of Le Républicain lorrain, French regional newspaper. This switch occurred when the paper was acquired by the Editpress, which also owns Le Jeudi and Tageblatt. The publisher of Le Quotidien, based in Esch-sur-Alzette, is the Lumedia. The paper is published in Berliner format.

The political leaning of Le Quotidien is left-liberal. The daily targets the foreign residents of Luxembourg and offers national, international and local news. The website of the paper was launched in 2001. On 10 November 2010 it launched a new look and a new logo. From the same date it started Panorama, a Saturday supplement with weekend reviews of entertainment and activities.

== Circulation ==
In 2003 Le Quotidien sold 5,469 copies based on the publisher report. In 2004 the circulation of the paper was 5,441 copies. The paper had a circulation of 6,637 copies in 2008 and 6,275 copies in 2009. It was 6,413 copies in 2010 and 7,021 copies in 2011.
