= La Voix du Luxembourg =

French-language Luxembourgish newspaper

- Publisher: Saint-Paul Luxembourg
- Founded: 2001
- Ceased publication: 30 September 2011
- Political alignment: Conservative
- Language: French
- Headquarters: Luxembourg
- Circulation: 4,000 (2010)
- Website: www.voix.lu/

La Voix du Luxembourg (French pronunciation: [la vwa dy lyksɑ̃buʁ], lit. 'The Voice of Luxembourg') was a French-language newspaper published in Luxembourg between 2001 and 2011.

== History and profile ==
Published by Saint-Paul Luxembourg, La Voix was the French language supplement of Saint-Paul's flagship Luxemburger Wort until it was launched as a separate newspaper in 2001. The paper was published between Mondays and Saturdays.

La Voix was headquartered in the city of Luxembourg and had a conservative stance. The newspaper received €933,221 in annual state press subsidy in 2009.

The circulation of La Voix was 9,909 copies in 2003. In 2004 the paper had a circulation of 4,000 copies. In 2006 its circulation was 8,529 copies. It was also 4,000 copies in 2010.

On 30 September 2011, the last edition of La Voix was published.
