= Woxx =

Newspaper in Luxembourg

- Type: Weekly newspaper
- Founded: 23 September 1988; 37 years ago
- Political alignment: Greens
- Language: French, German, and Luxembourgish
- Headquarters: Luxembourg
- Circulation: 3,000 (2010)

Woxx is a multilingual weekly newspaper published in Luxembourg.

== History and profile ==
The newspaper was founded as GréngeSpoun by the Greens in 1988. In 2000, it was renamed as Woxx and given independence, although its editorials still support the Greens. The weekly is published weekly on Fridays in all three of Luxembourg's official languages: French, German, and Luxembourgish.

The headquarters of Woxx is in the city of Luxembourg. It received €230,417 in annual state press subsidy in 2009.

Woxx had a circulation of around 3,000 copies in 2004. It was again 3,000 copies in 2010.
