= Muselzeidung =

- Language: Luxembourgish

Muselzeidung is a newspaper published in Luxembourg.
