= Groupe Nicolas =

Groupe Nicolas is the third biggest publisher in Luxembourg. It's the only publisher which is not a member of the "Conseil de Presse" and does not cooperate with the "Service d'Information et Presse". At the moment, the weekly newspaper Privat, the online newspaper LuxPrivat.lu, the web radio Radio-Privat, the web-TV Privat-TV, the paper about celebrities Promi and the satirical paper d'Wäschfra are part of the group.

On March 30, 2011, the group started a campaign called "Fir eng Fräi Press zu Lëtzebuerg! Géint Zensur!", which means as much as "For a free press in Luxembourg! Against Censorship!"

== Media ==
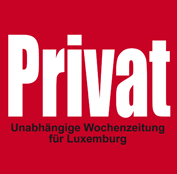
Logo from the Privat-Medien

Privat is a German languaged News- and Online-Paper, Web-Radio and -TV in Luxembourg. On November 3, 2006, the first Privat Lëtzebuerg newspaper released, with Jean Nicolas as publisher, Heinz Kerp as Editor, and Sven Günther as Chief Editor. Before April 2011, when Groupe Nicolas removed "Lëtzebuerg" from all the media they publish, the newspaper was known as Lëtzebuerg Privat.

LuxPrivat.lu is the web page belonging to the newspaper was launched on January 4, 2011. The mark of 2 million web page visitors was reached within one year.

The web radio Privat was launched on March 1, 2011 and streams on work days between 8 am and 6 pm. Its activity ceased in 2012.

Privat-TV first released on February 25, 2011 online. All the reports created for Privat-TV get created in cooperation with Simba Pro.

The first release of Promi Lëtzebuerg came out in the beginning of 2008. The topic is mostly about the lives of Luxembourg's celebrities and the high-society.

February 5, 2010, the first release of d'Wäschfra came out. In the paper, well-known people (e. g. politicians or celebrities) are being made fun of. The paper got its name from a satirical newspaper which has been very successful.
