= Revue (magazine) =

German language weekly illustrated magazine in Luxembourg

Revue is a German language weekly illustrated magazine published in Luxembourg.

== History and profile ==
Revue was established in 1945. It was published by an independent publisher and was owned by a family. In 2000 the weekly was sold to Editpress.

The magazine provides news on TV programs and famous people including the members of Grand Ducal family.
