= Das Luxemburger Land =

Luxembourgish newspaper (1882–1887)

Das Luxemburger Land was a newspaper published in Luxembourg between 1882 and 1887.
