= Le Jeudi =

French weekly newspaper

- Type: Weekly newspaper
- Publisher: Editpress
- Founded: 17 April 1997
- Ceased publication: June 6, 2019
- Language: French
- Circulation: 6,500 (2004)
- Website: www.lejeudi.lu

Le Jeudi (French pronunciation: [lə ʒødi], lit. 'The Thursday') was a French-language weekly newspaper published in Luxembourg.

== History and profile ==
Le Jeudi was established in 1997. The paper is published in French by Editpress.

Le Jeudi received €358,005 in annual state press subsidy in 2009.

The 2004 circulation of the paper was 6,500 copies.
