= Journal de la ville et du Grand-Duché de Luxembourg =

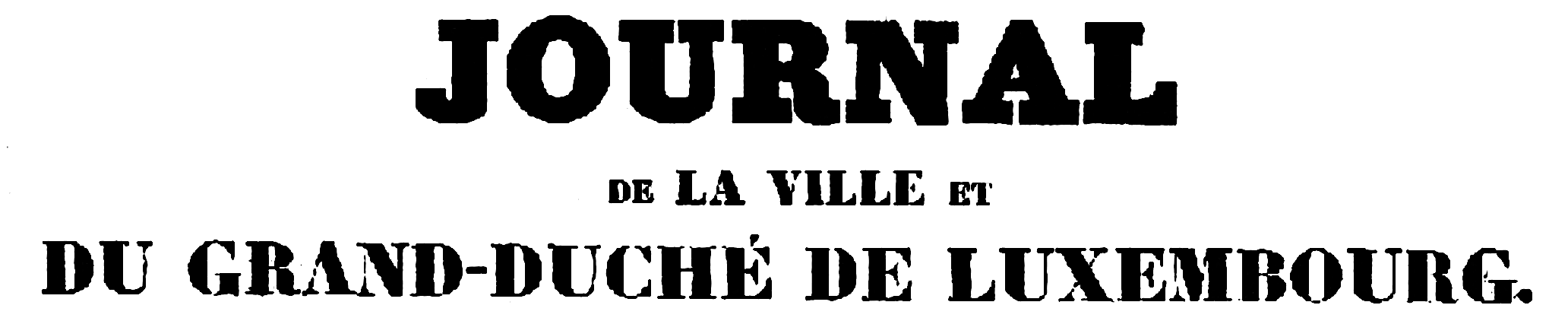
- Founded: 1826
- Ceased publication: 1844
- Language: French
- Headquarters: Luxembourg City

Journal de la ville et du Grand-Duché de Luxembourg was a newspaper published in Luxembourg between 1826 and 1844.
