= Luxemburger Volksblatt (1933–1941) =

- Founded: 1933
- Language: German

Luxemburger Volksblatt was a far-right newspaper published in Luxembourg between 1933 and 1941.

Its motto was "Work, Authority, Loyalty to the Homeland" (Arbeit, Autorität, Heimattreue). The editor was Leo Müller, who had previously worked as an editor at the Luxemburger Wort.

Political views advocated by the Volksblatt included, among others, a 'ruthless cleansing of certain foreign elements that corrupt our people.' In the advertisement section, was the exhortation: 'Luxembourgers, buy from Luxembourgers!' Recurring themes included a strong, 'pure' nation, under threat from outside as well as from foreigners within the country; the fight against parliamentarism and against parties that supposedly undermined the interests of 'the people', of 'the common folk'; and advocating for a strong 'leader' figure, for corporatism. The Belgian Rexism of Léon Degrelle served as a model in many respects.

After the German invasion of Luxembourg in May 1940, the Volksblatt initially continued to operate. Loyal to the country's occupiers, the subtitle became Heim ins Reich ("home into the Reich"). In October 1941, it was definitively discontinued and taken over by the Nationalblatt.
