= Zeitung vum Lëtzebuerger Vollek =

Newspaper

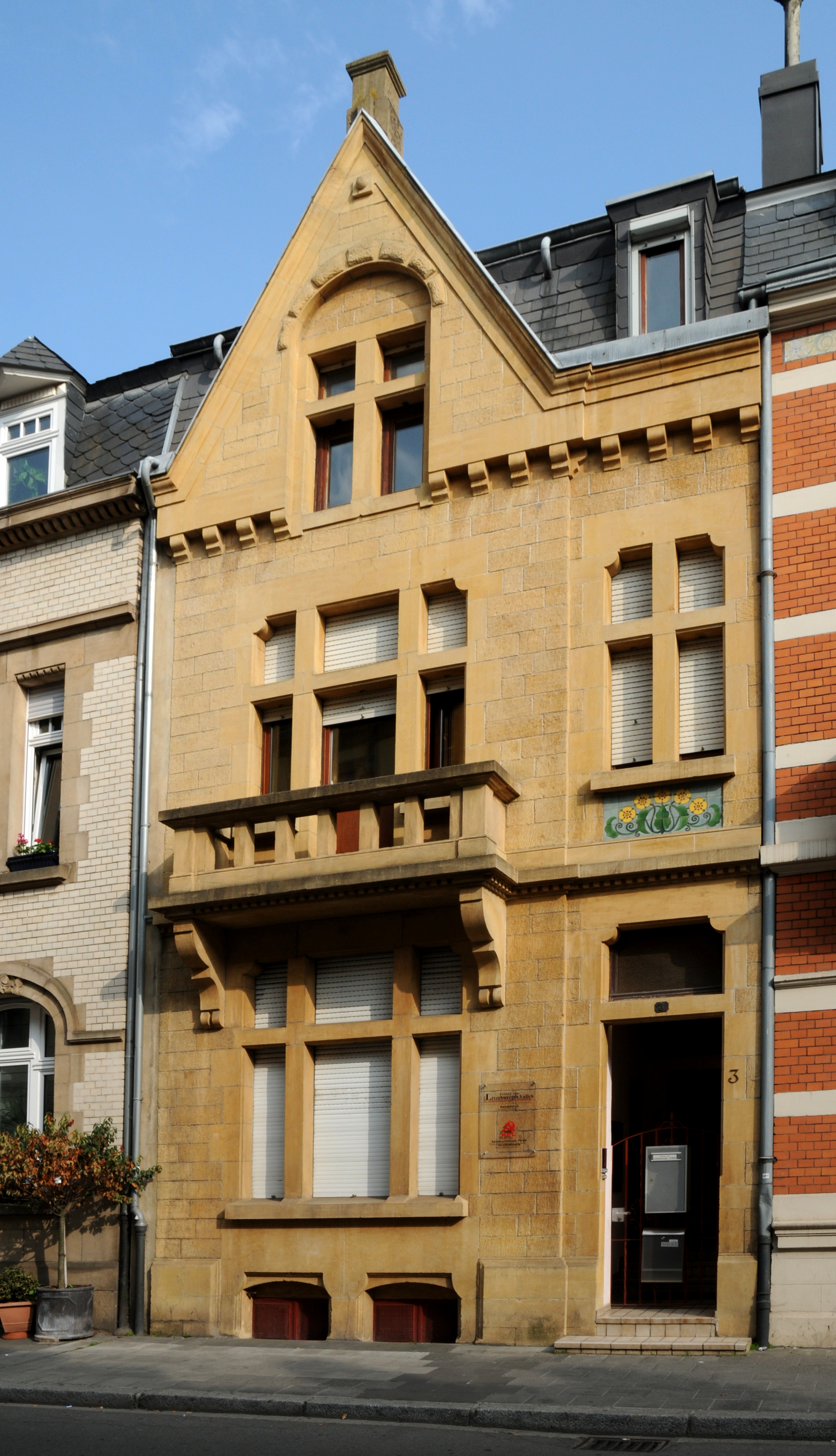
- A building for newspaper published in Luxembourg by the Communist Party of Luxembourg
- Type: Daily newspaper
- Owner: Communist Party of Luxembourg
- Founded: 1 July 1946; 79 years ago
- Language: German
- Circulation: 1,000 (2004)
- Website: www.zlv.lu/

Zeitung vum Lëtzebuerger Vollek (Luxembourgish pronunciation: [ˈtsɑɪ̯tuŋ fum ˈlətsəbu̯əjɐ ˈfolək], lit. 'Newspaper of the Luxembourgish People') is a newspaper published in Luxembourg by the Communist Party of Luxembourg.

== History and profile ==
Zeitung vum Lëtzebuerger Vollek was established in 1946. The paper is published in German language and is owned by the Communist Party of Luxembourg.

Zeitung vum Lëtzebuerger Vollek received €353,281 in annual state press subsidy in 2009.

The 2004 circulation of the paper was 1,000 copies.
