= Luxemburger Volksblatt (1901–02) =

- Language: German

Luxemburger Volksblatt was a newspaper published in Luxembourg between January 3, 1901 and October 4, 1902. It was the successor to Der Patriot, published from March 13, 1897 to December 31, 1900.
