= La Clef du cabinet des princes de l'Europe =

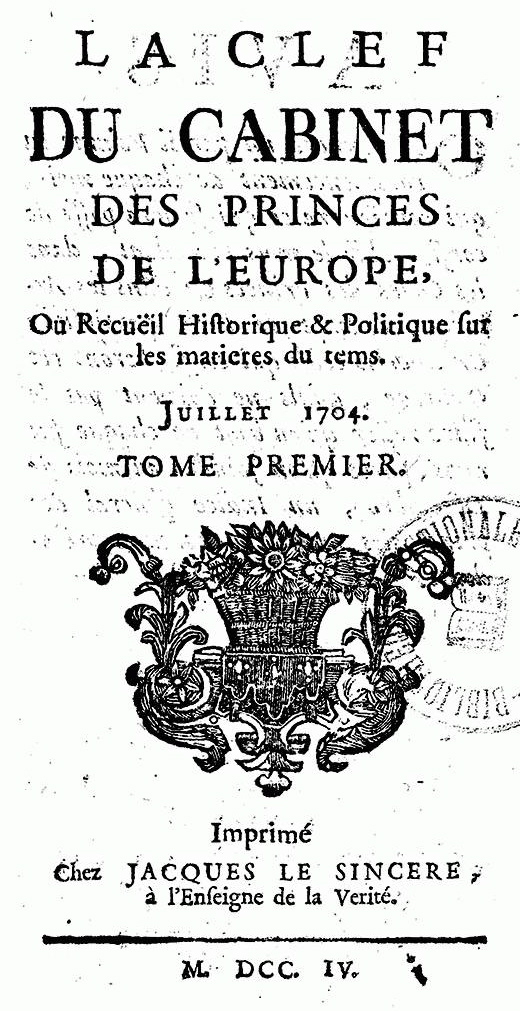
- Cover first edition
- Language: French

La Clef du cabinet des princes de l'Europe ou recuëil historique & politique sur les matieres du tems ("The key of the cabinet of the princes of Europe or A historical and political compilation on the matters of the day") was the first newspaper published in Luxembourg. Its first edition appeared on 1 July 1704. It then appeared monthly, without interruption, until July 1794.

Behind the enterprise were initially the librarian, printer and journalist Claude Jordan (born around 1659) from Valence, and the printer André Chevalier (1660-1747), a Frenchman from Bourg-en-Bresse, who had a printing press in Luxembourg city. Jordan had previously published the Gazettes de Hollande in Leyden and Amsterdam.

The two paired up in 1704 in order to publish a newspaper for Lorraine (at the time independent of France) and the French market based in Luxembourg, after the example of the Gazettes de Hollande. There was at the time no such thing as a Luxembourgish market.

The title La Clef du cabinet des princes de l’Europe ou recuëil historique & politique sur les matieres du tems was a whole agenda: the newspaper was to grant insight behind the scenes of the government cabinets, where war and peace in Europe were decided (this was the time of the War of the Spanish Succession).The structure was always the same: international news, divided by the kingdoms; there was a rubric for "Gossip and Current Affairs" (ceremonies and hunts that the King had participated in, birth of monarchs' children, etc.), and reviews of new books. Gradually, more and more news on regional parliaments appeared, or articles on Enlightenment philosophers who opposed absolutism.

The first 12 years the newspaper appeared without the name of the editor or the place of publication. As it did not have a Privilège royal, it was not protected against unlicensed reprinting, and had to pay a heavy stamp duty.

In 1716, Jordan and Chevalier parted ways due to a dispute over profits. Jourdan went to Paris where he published the Suite de la clef, ou Journal historique sur les matieres du tems, which existed until 1776. Chevalier received the privilege from Emperor Charles IV, who now ruled Luxembourg, to continue publishing La clef du Cabinet des princes. It was not known who was the editor after Jordan left. After 1730 it was a certain Pierre Bourgeois.

After 1750, the strict regime which concerned the publishing of newspapers in France was gradually loosened; more and more newspapers were published, and interest in the Gazette de Hollande and in the Clef du Cabinet correspondingly declined.

In 1769 Clef du Cabinet des Princes was banned, for printing critical articles on the famines. In 1794 publication ceased.
