= De Peck-Villchen =

Newspaper in Luxembourg from 1945 to 1956

- Founded: 1945
- Ceased publication: 1956
- Language: Luxembourgish

De Peck-Villchen was a newspaper published in Luxembourg between 1945 and 1956.
