= Luxemburger Volksblatt (1880–1887) =

Luxemburger Volksblatt (1880-1887)
- Language: German

Luxemburger Volksblatt was a newspaper published in Luxembourg between 1880 and 1887.
