= Tageblatt =

Luxembourgish daily newspaper

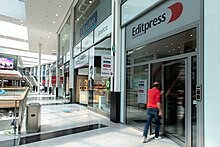
- Office of the Tageblatt in Esch-sur-Alzette.
- Type: Daily newspaper
- Format: Compact
- Owner: Socialist Trade Unions
- Publisher: Editpress
- Founded: 1 July 1913 (as Escher Tageblatt)
- Political alignment: Centre-left
- Language: German
- Headquarters: Esch-sur-Alzette
- Circulation: 10,400 (2020)
- Website: www.tageblatt.lu

Tageblatt (German pronunciation: [ˈtaːɡəˌblat], Luxembourgish: [ˈtaːɡəˌblɑt]) is a German language daily newspaper published in Esch-sur-Alzette, Luxembourg by Editpress.

== Overview ==
Tageblatt was established in 1913. The paper is the country's second-most popular newspaper, behind the rival Luxemburger Wort. Tageblatt describes itself as the Zeitung fir Lëtzebuerg (Luxembourgish for the newspaper for Luxembourg). Although it is mainly published in German, it has also sections published in French language.

The daily is owned by socialist trade unions. The publisher is Editpress Luxembourg SA, which also publishes Le Jeudi and Le Quotidien. As of 2007 the daily had close relations with the Socialist Party (LSAP).

The newspaper received €1,659,554 in annual state press subsidy in 2009: more than any other newspaper.

The circulation of Tageblatt was 27,081 copies in 2003. In 2004, the paper had a daily circulation of 17,106: about one-quarter that of Luxemburger Wort. In the mid-2000s its readership was 61,100, or just over one-third that of its rival.

== History ==
Historically, the Escher Tageblatt considered itself an instrument in the political battle for the Left Bloc which dominated Luxembourgish politics from 1908 to 1916. This bloc was composed of democrats and young liberals, who were less conservative than the liberals who had dominated political life in the Grand Duchy for the 19th century. The democrats also called themselves social democrats since the foundation of the social-democratic party in 1903 around Michel Welter (1856- 1924). The majority that the Bloc had in the Chamber of Deputies since 1908 consisted of Deputies from the cantons of Esch, Luxembourg-Ville and Luxembourg-Campagne, in other words, the main industrialised cantons comprising the most important localities in the country.

Elections to the Chamber took place using a majoritarian system with two rounds up until 1919. The constituencies were the cantons. The candidates stood for election individually, but in the most populous cantons, alliances could come about as early as the first round, but almost always in the second round.

The canton of Esch had the highest population and was allocated 15 Deputies (out of 51) in 1914. The group that would win the canton of Esch was certain to have a political force in the Chamber. It was to this end that the Escher Tageblatt was founded in 1913.

However, the Left Bloc lost its majority to the Party of the Right in 1917. In 1919, a new proportional representation system with party lists was introduced, with four constituencies (South, Centre, North, East). The South constituency formed from the cantons of Esch and Capellen is still to this day the constituency with the highest population, and has the highest number of deputies. The Escher Tageblatt could therefore continue to function with its "regional" title, while still making efforts to win over readers from the centre through agencies in the capital, first in the Rue Chimay, then in 6 Rue de la Reine.

On 2 May 1947 it renamed itself the Tageblatt, while retaining the French sub-title of "journal d’Esch", which it carried since 1918. This sub-title disappeared on 2 January 1973, as regional differences faded. Soon, the south was no longer exclusively industrial (after the steel crisis of the 1970s), nor were the north and east exclusively focused on farming or wine-growing. Helped by mobility, living conditions were increasingly similar from one constituency to another.

The founder of the newspaper was Paul Schroell (1879-1939), who came from a family of printers, book-sellers and editors from Echternach and Diekirch. His cousin Emile Schroell (1863-1934) was the owner of the Luxemburger Zeitung, a moderate liberal newspaper (1868-1941) created by Théophile Schroell (1829-1893) in the capital. In 1911 he had rejected the offer by Paul Schroell (also the editor of the Landwirt, published in Diekirch) to merge their printing companies. In creating the Escher Tageblatt, Paul Schroell then founded a competing company in the canton of Esch, home to the steel industry and the economic centre of the country. Clearly more combative than the venerable daily newspaper of Emile Schroell, the Escher Tageblatt had from the start a more polemical and feisty tone in political debates.

The history of the Tageblatt consists of two stages, which are distinct in some ways, but show some continuity, embodied by the founder's plan to bring together the various components of the political and intellectual left wing of the country. The first stage was from 1913 to 1927, the second from 1927 to the present day. It was in 1927 that the independent trade unions and the Worker's Party bought the newspaper and printing works belonging to Paul Schroell for 1 million Luxembourgish francs, while renting the office spaces in Esch and with the obligation, imposed by the seller, to keep on the hitherto employed staff.

In 1913 the Escher Tageblatt had a circulation of around 2,000. It was, then, a newspaper with a lower circulation than the two largest newspapers, the Luxemburger Wort (circulation 8,000) and the Luxemburger Zeitung (6,000).
