= D'Ro'd Wullmaus =

Luxembourg newspaper, 1970 to 1973

- Founded: 1970
- Ceased publication: 1973
- Language: Luxembourgish

D'Ro'd Wullmaus was a newspaper published in Luxembourg between 1970 and 1973.
