= L'essentiel (newspaper) =

Francophone, free daily newspaper in Luxembourg

- Type: Free daily newspaper
- Format: Compact
- Owner(s): Tamedia (50%); Editpress (50%)
- Publisher: Edita SA
- Editor: Saïd Kerrou
- Founded: 10 October 2007
- Language: French
- Headquarters: 53 rue Emile Mark, 4620 Differdange
- Website: www.lessentiel.lu

L'essentiel (French pronunciation: [lesɑ̃sjɛl]; lit. The essential) is a francophone, free daily newspaper in Luxembourg.

== History and profile ==
L'essentiel was established in 2007 and is published in French. It is published by Edita SA: a joint venture between Switzerland's Tamedia and Luxembourg-based Editpress. It covers all essential news of Luxembourg, economy, sports & global.
