= Mediahuis Luxembourg =

Owner of Luxembourg's largest newspaper, Luxemburger Wort

Mediahuis Luxembourg S.A.
- Company type: Private
- Industry: Media
- Founded: 20 November 1886
- Headquarters: 31, rue de Hollerich L-1741, Luxembourg City, Luxembourg
- Area served: Luxembourg
- Key people: Erny Gillen, President; Paul Peckels, General director
- Products: Luxemburger Wort, Contacto, Telecran, Radiolatina, Libo, Editions Saint-Paul
- Services: Newspapers, magazines, radio station, publishing, bookselling
- Number of employees: 420
- Parent: Mediahuis (2020–present)
- Subsidiaries: Saint-Paul Luxembourg S.A. Libo S.A. Reliure Saint-Paul S.à.r.l. Radiolatina; Editions Saint-Paul
- Website: https://www.mediahuis.lu/fr/

Mediahuis Luxembourg S.A. (Luxembourgish pronunciation: [ˈmeːdjɑhɑʊ̯s]), formerly Groupe Saint-Paul Luxembourg is the owner of Luxembourg's largest newspaper, Luxemburger Wort, and its news website wort.lu. It is based at a large centralized complex in Gasperich, in the south of Luxembourg City.

In May 2020, Mediahuis acquired Saint-Paul Luxembourg. Saint-Paul changed its name to Mediahuis Luxembourg officially in July 2021.

Furthermore, the group has other activities and products including:

- Newspapers and magazines (Luxemburger Wort, Télécran, AutoMoto, Contacto)
- Internet and radio (wort.lu, mywort.lu, Radio Latina)
- Printing and publishing (Myprint, Editions Saint-Paul, Reliure Saint-Paul)
- Advertising and classifieds (régie.lu)
- Libo bookshops

== Newspapers ==
- Ardenner express
- Contacto
- La Voix du Luxembourg (discontinued)
- Luxemburger Wort
- Point 24 (discontinued)
- Telecran
- Tendances Lifestyle (discontinued)

== Websites ==
- Mediahuis Luxembourg website
- wort.lu - English
- wort.lu - German
- wort.lu - French

== Radio stations ==
- Radio DNR Luxembourg (discontinued)
- Radio Latina

== Publishing ==
- Imprimerie Saint-Paul
- Editions Saint-Paul
- Reliure Saint-Paul

== Other ==
- Libo

== General directors ==
- 2003 to 2006: Charles Ruppert
- 2006 to 31 June 2009: Léon Zeches
- 1 July 2009 to July 2013: Paul Lenert
- 1 September 2013: Paul Peckels

== Presidents ==
- 2016-2019: Luc Frieden
- 2019-2021: François Pauly
