= Joseph Kutter =

Luxembourgish artist

Joseph J F Kutter
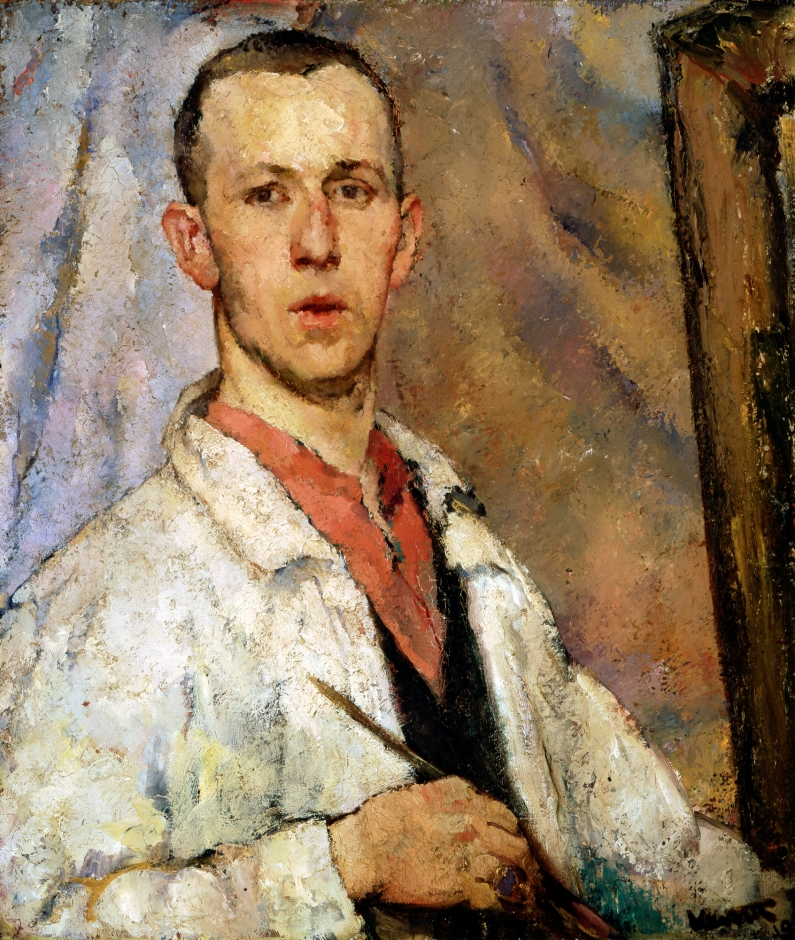
- Self portrait
- Born: 12 December 1894; Luxembourg
- Died: 2 January 1941 (aged 46); Luxembourg
- Movement: Expressionism

Luxembourg, one of two paintings that Kutter was commissioned to paint for the 1937 World Exhibition in Paris

Joseph Jean Ferdinand Kutter (1894–1941) is considered one of Luxembourg's most important painters. He was greatly influenced by the Impressionists but developed his own distinctive Expressionist style.

== Early life ==
Kutter was born on 12 December 1894 in Luxembourg City where his father, Paul Kutter, was one of the city's early photographers. Hoping to become a painter, he first attended the Ecole d'Artisans in Luxembourg and then the schools of decorative art in Strasbourg and Munich. From 1917 to 1918, he studied at the Munich Academy where he was introduced to a style of painting inspired by Wilhelm Leibl.

== Artistic career ==
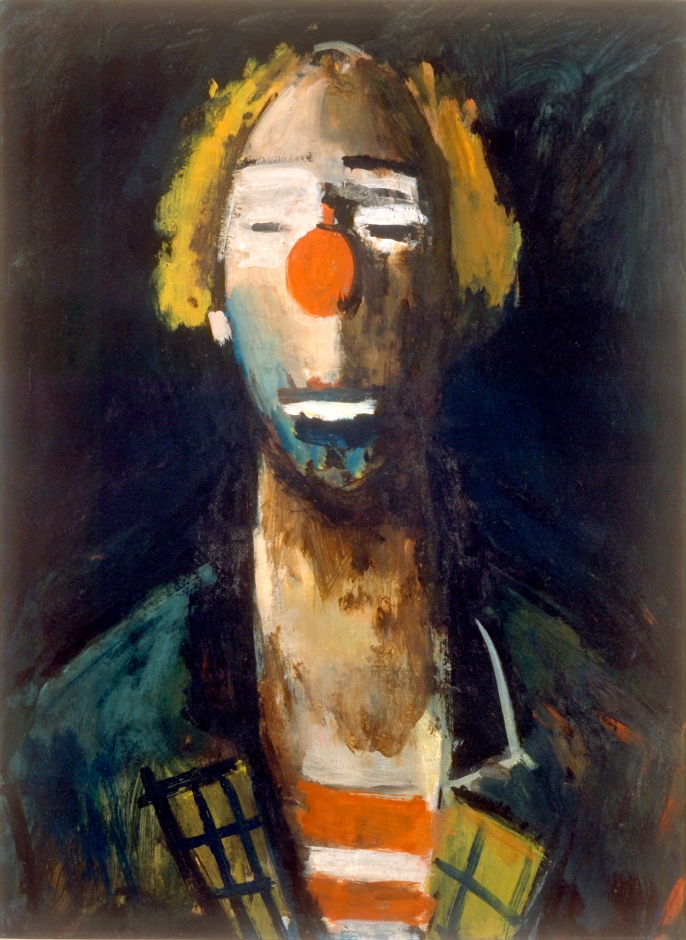
Head of a Clown, c. 1937

From 1919, after being strongly influenced by Cézanne, he presented his paintings at the Secessionist exhibitions in Munich. Although he returned to Luxembourg in 1924, he continued to exhibit in Munich until 1932 as a result of the negative criticism his nude paintings received in his home town. From 1925, he became increasingly interested in Flemish Expressionism which was flourishing in Belgium and France. Encouraged by André de Ridder, a Belgian art critic and strong supporter of Expressionism, Kutter participated in the 1926 Salon d'Automne in Paris. The same year, he became a founding member of the avant-garde Luxembourg secession movement, exhibiting at its salon in 1927.

He also continued to exhibit regularly at the Salon d'automne in Paris. His abilities were widely recognized in France and Belgium, much less so in Germany. In 1933, he ceased exhibiting in Germany after being considered a degenerate as Hitler gained power. In 1936, he was commissioned to paint two large works of "Luxembourg" and "Clervaux" for the French International Exposition. While he was working on them, he began to suffer from a painful disease which the doctors were unable to diagnose. Later, during his better periods, he painted his clowns which reveal his suffering and anxiety. He died on 2 January 1941 in Luxembourg City.

== Style ==
In Kutter's paintings, the subjects often stand in the foreground as if being photographed. His portraits, painted with strong brushstrokes, typically show figures with excessively large noses, always attracting attention.

From 1918, Kutter's paintings increasingly began to present Expressionist motifs, especially in his landscapes and floral works where intense lines and colours became prominent. Although Kutter spent a number of years in Germany, his work was influenced above all by trends in France and Belgium. His centre of attention was the human figure. He often represented his subjects as sad, despairing clowns. The two large paintings (of Luxembourg City and Clervaux) he was commissioned to paint for Luxembourg's pavilion at the 1937 World Exposition in Paris are excellent examples of his maturing Expressionist style. In his painting of "Luxembourg" (above), his view of the city accentuates the stacked terracing of the houses, emphasizes the cubic appearance of the buildings, bestows a harsh appearance on the defensive walls and brings out the strength of the fortifications.

== Selected works ==
- The Champion (1932), National Museum of Art and History, Luxembourg, depicts the Luxembourg racing cyclist Nicolas Frantz (1899–1985).
- The Wooden Horse (1937), National Museum of Art and History, Luxembourg.
- Luxembourg (1936–37), National Museum of Art and History, Luxembourg.
- Clervaux (1936–37), National Museum of Art and History, Luxembourg.
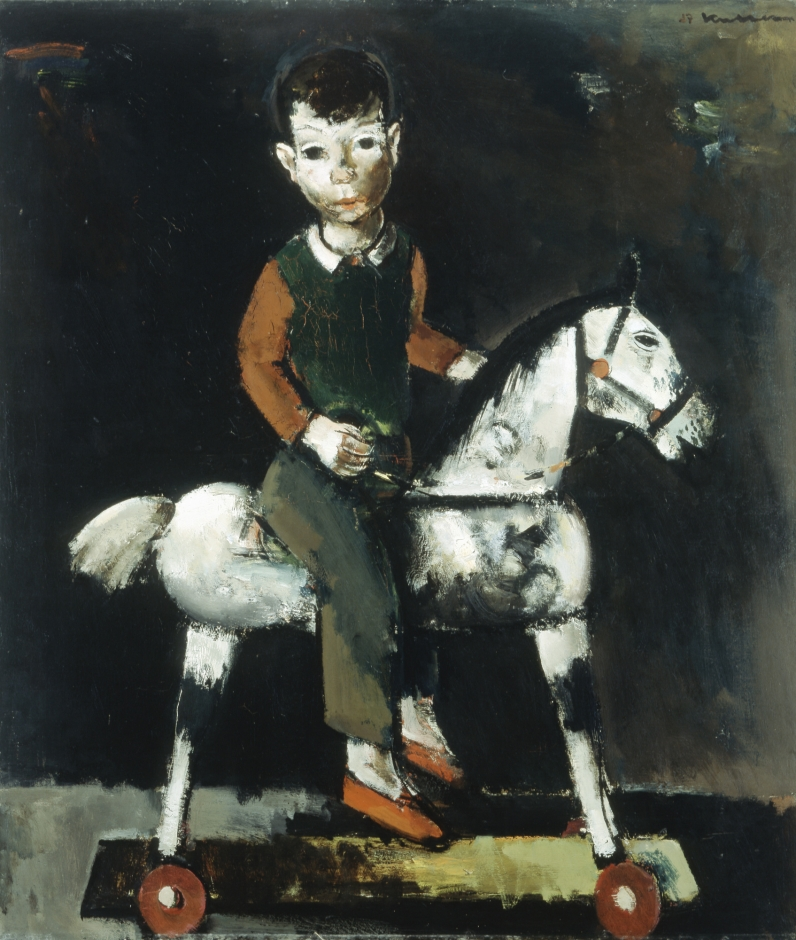
Cheval de bois (1937)

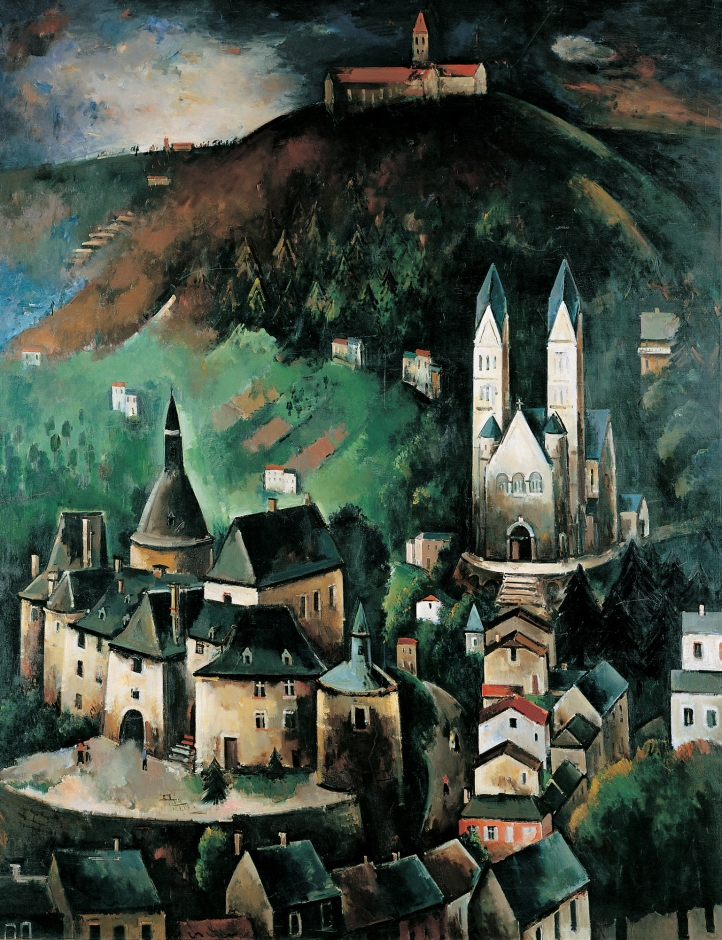
Clervaux (1937)

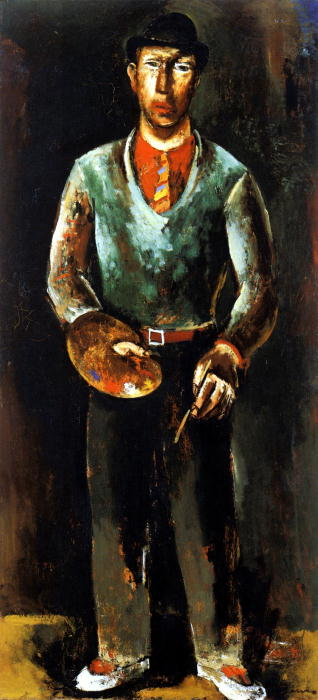
Self portrait (c. 1936)

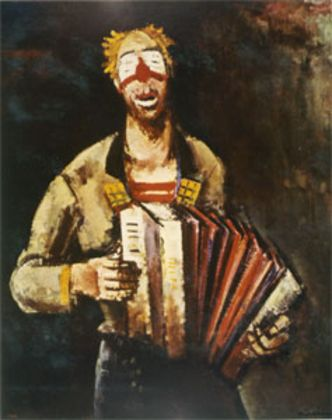
Clown avec accordéon (1936)

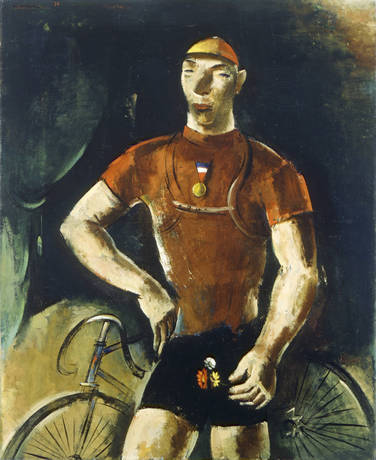
Le Champion (1932)
