= Luxemburger Zeitung =

Former Luxembourgish daily newspaper

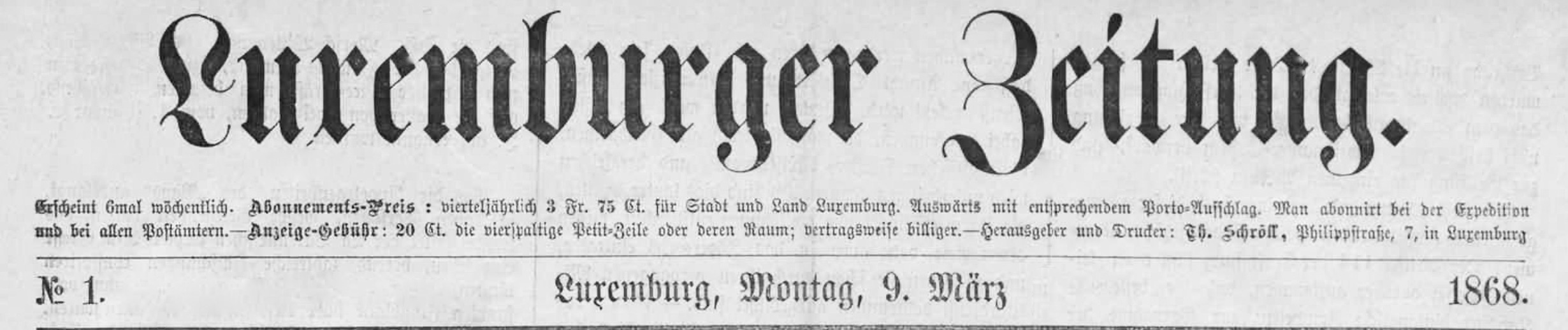
Logo, 1st edition

The Luxemburger Zeitung (German pronunciation: [ˈlʊksm̩ˌbʊʁɡɐ ˈtsaɪtʊŋ]; transl. "Luxembourgish Newspaper") was a liberal, German-language daily newspaper, which appeared from 9 March 1868 to 29 September 1941 in Luxembourg. It appeared six days a week and was the successor to the French-language Courrier du Grand-Duché de Luxembourg, which had ceased publication three days before the Luxemburger Zeitung first appeared.

== Background ==
Théophile Schroell was the editor and printer. From 1 January 1902 to 14 May 1940 it appeared twice a day, with a morning and an evening edition, the first Luxembourg newspaper to do so.

In 1893, Batty Weber became editor-in-chief and culture and entertainment editor. From 1913 to 1940 he wrote the Abreißkalender, an (almost) daily column commenting on social, cultural, economic, artistic and political realities in Luxembourg. As the Luxemburger Zeitung had taken a stand in the debate over the education law of 1912 and had advocated in favour of the law and its reforms, the Diocese of Luxembourg made it forbidden to read the newspaper. The latter then experienced financial difficulties and was acquired in 1922 by a group around Emile Mayrisch, the managing director of ARBED. Batty Weber subsequently withdrew from the political aspect of the newspaper, and Jean-Pierre Robert became the new editor-in-chief. Mayrisch's successor, Aloyse Meyer made sure after 1933 that the newspaper did not publish anything that might offend the Germans. The editor-in-chief Robert was the right choice for this; the Luxemburger Zeitung was the only Luxembourg newspaper that was not banned in Germany once Hitler came to power. After the German invasion of Luxembourg in 1940, Robert continued to edit the Luxemburger Zeitung, making it follow a completely pro-Nazi line.

In September its last edition appeared, and Jean-Pierre Robert subsequently went to work for the Luxemburger Wort.
