= Editpress =

Publishing company

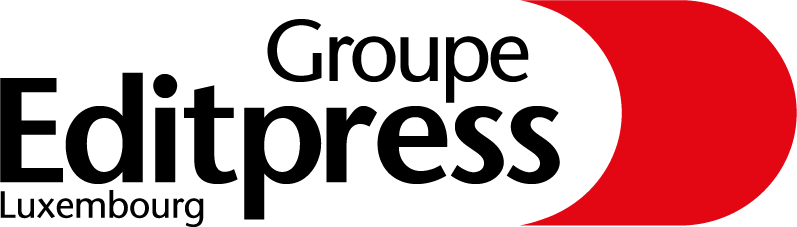
- Founded: 1913
- Key people: Jacques Eischen (CEO)
- Products: Tageblatt; Le Quotidien; Revue; L'essentiel
- Website: editpress.lu

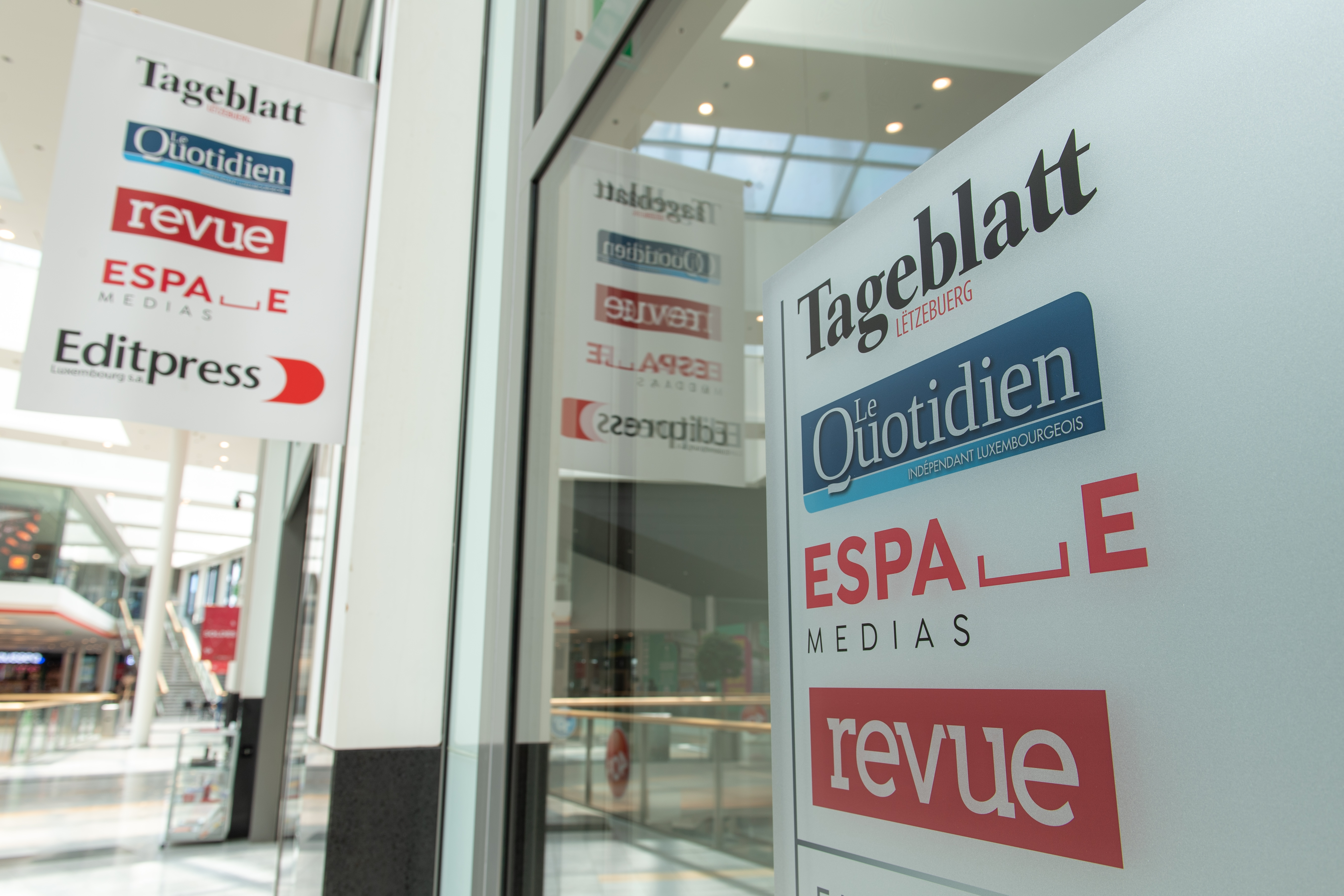
Headquarters in Belval (Esch-sur-Alzette)

Editpress is a publishing company in Luxembourg. It publishes several newspapers, including its flagship daily Tageblatt, and 50% shares in the free daily L'essentiel and the French-language daily Le Quotidien.

Editpress is based in the Red Lands city of Esch-sur-Alzette. It has close ties to the Luxembourg Socialist Workers' Party and trade unions. Editpress's main rival is Mediahuis Luxembourg, which is allied to the Christian Social People's Party and owns Luxembourg's main paid-for newspaper, the Luxemburger Wort.
