= List of painters from Luxembourg =

This is a list of notable painters from, or associated with, Luxembourg.

== B ==
- Pierre Brandebourg (1824–1878)

== D ==
- Max Dauphin (born 1977)

== E ==
- Michel Engels (1851–1901)

== F ==
- Jean-Baptiste Fresez (1800–1867)

== G ==
- Gust Graas (1924–2020)

== J ==
- Jean Jacoby (1891–1936)

== K ==
- Théo Kerg (1909–1993)
- Will Kesseler (1899–1983)
- Emile Kirscht (1913–1994)
- Nico Klopp (1894–1930)
- Max Kohn (born 1954)
- Joseph Kutter (1894–1941)

== L ==
- Dominique Lang (1874–1919)
- Nicolas Liez (1809–1892)

== M ==
- Michel Majerus (1967–2002)

== P ==
- Joseph Probst (1911–1997)

== R ==
- Harry Rabinger (1895–1966)

== S ==
- Frantz Seimetz (1858–1934)
- Michel Stoffel (1903–1963)

== T ==
- Foni Tissen (1909–1975)

== W ==
- Sosthène Weis (1872–1941)

== See also ==
- List of artists from Luxembourg
