= List of Luxembourgian artists =

This is a selected list of notable artists from, or with links to, Luxembourg.

== B ==
- Pierre Brandebourg (1824–1878), painter, photographer

== C ==
- Claus Cito (1882–1965), sculptor

== E ==
- Michel Engels (1851–1901), illustrator, painter

== F ==
- Jean-Baptiste Fresez (1800–1867), artist

== G ==
- Gust Graas (1924–2020), artist, businessman

== H ==
- Frantz Heldenstein (1892–1975), sculptor

== K ==
- Théo Kerg (1909–1993), artist
- Will Kesseler (1899–1983), painter
- Emile Kirscht (1913–1994), painter
- Nico Klopp (1894–1930), painter
- Max Kohn (born 1954) painter, sculptor
- Joseph Kutter (1894–1941), painter

== L ==
- Dominique Lang (1874–1919), painter
- Nicolas Liez (1809–1892), lithographer, painter
- Wil Lofy (1937–2021), sculptor, painter

== M ==
- Michel Majerus (1967–2002), artist
- Bady Minck (born 1960), artist, filmmaker

== P ==
- Raymond Petit (born 1954), sculptor
- Joseph Probst (1911–1997), artist

== R ==
- Harry Rabinger (1895–1966), painter
- Pierre-Joseph Redouté (1759–1840), painter

== S ==
- Frantz Seimetz (1858–1934), painter
- Edward Steichen (1879–1973), painter, photographer
- Michel Stoffel (1903–1963), painter

== T ==
- Foni Tissen (1909–1975), artist
- Auguste Trémont (1892–1980), sculptor
- Su-Mei Tse (born 1973), artist, sculptor

== W ==
- Sosthène Weis (1872–1941), painter, architect
- Lucien Wercollier (1908–2002), sculptor
