= Seimetz =

Seimetz is a surname. Notable people with the surname include:

- Amy Seimetz (born 1981), American actress, writer, producer, director, and editor
- Frantz Seimetz (1858–1934), Luxembourg artist
