= View of Luxembourg from the Fetschenhof =

Painting by Nicolas Liez

- Vue de la ville de Luxembourg depuis le Fetschenhof (French)
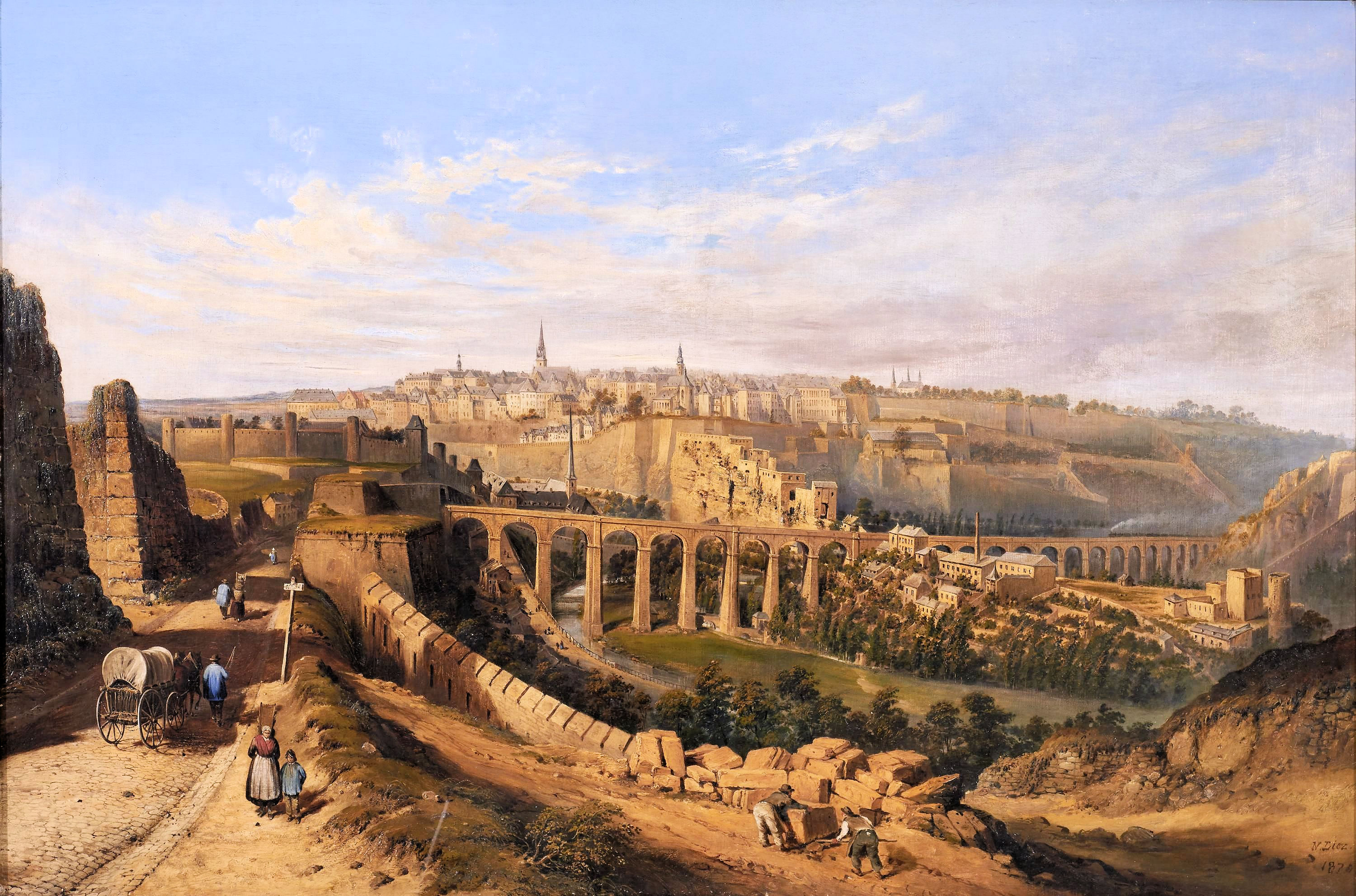
- Artist: Nicolas Liez
- Year: 1870
- Medium: oil on canvas
- Dimensions: 78 cm × 118 cm (30.7 in × 46.5 in)
- Location: Musée national d'histoire et d'art; Luxembourg

View of Luxembourg from the Fetschenhof is a painting by Nicolas Liez, from 1870.

== Analysis ==
The painting show the dismantling of the fortress after the Treaty of London of 1867. It shows a luminosity and scale of German Romanticism.
