= Charles Kohl =

Luxembourgish sculptor (1929–2016)

- Born: Charles Kohl; 16 April 1929; Rodange, Luxembourg
- Died: 3 January 2016 (age 86); Berschbach, Luxembourg
- Education: École nationale supérieure des arts décoratifs (1948–1952) and the École nationale supérieure des Beaux-Arts in Paris (1953–1955).
- Known for: Sculpting, painting, lecturing
- Awards: Prix Grand-Duc Adolphe (1956 and 1962)

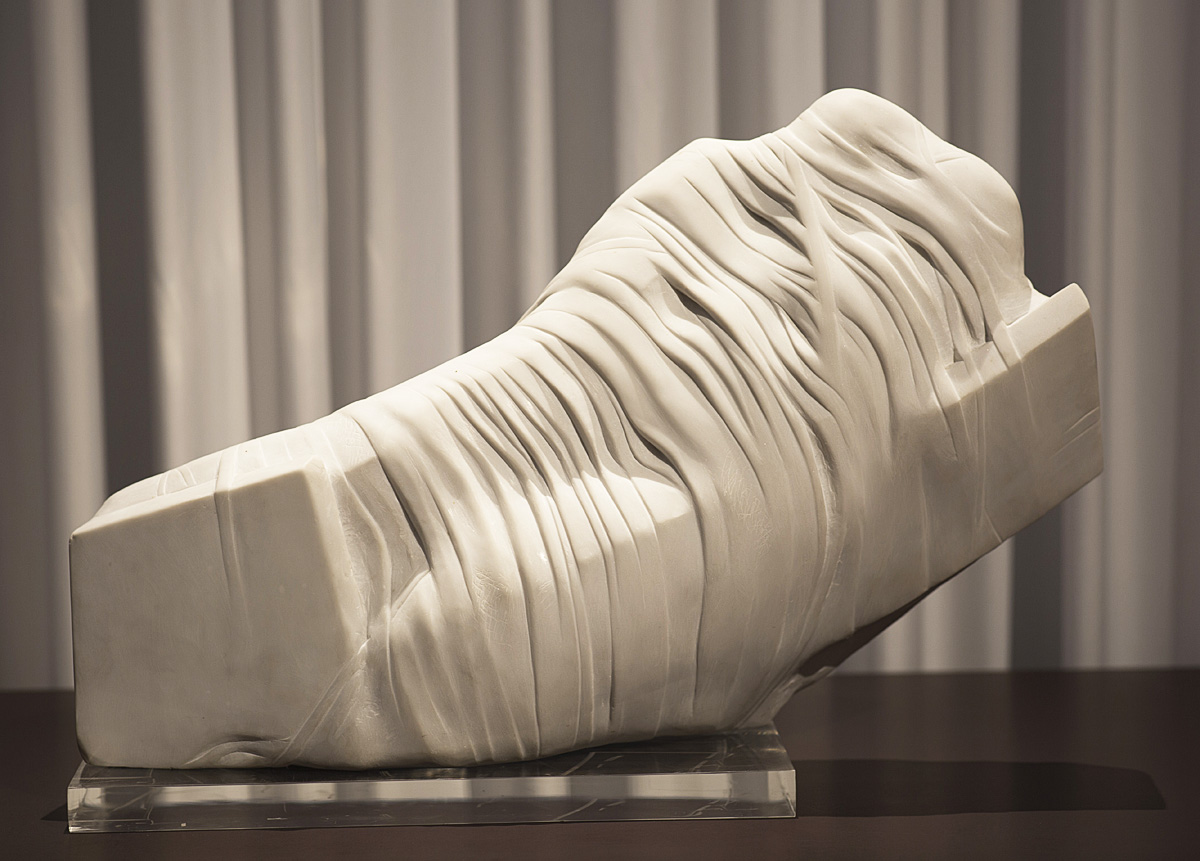
“Formes drapées”, marble (1983)

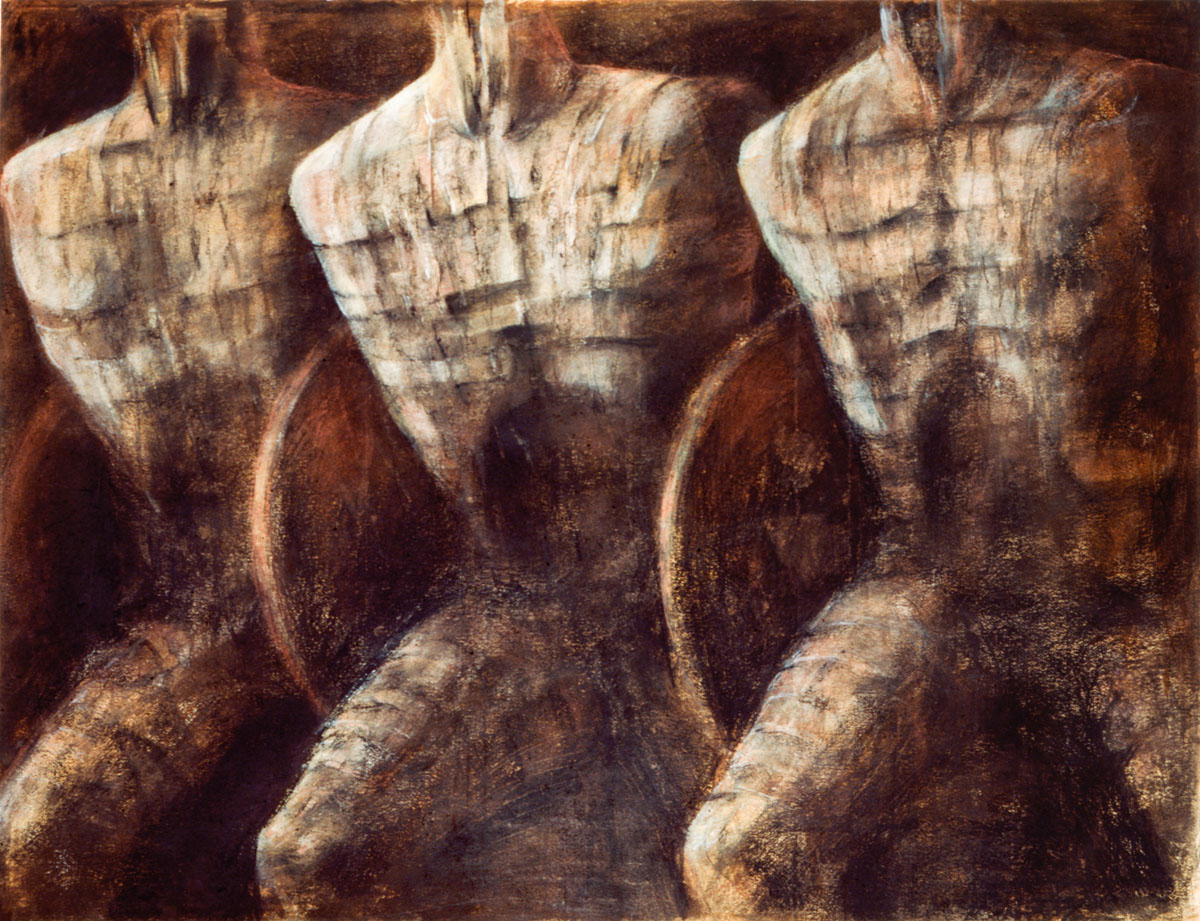
“Guerriers”, mixed technique (1988)

Charles Kohl (16 April 1929 – 3 January 2016) was a sculptor, painter and lecturer from Luxembourg.

== Biography ==
Born in Rodange (Luxembourg), Charles Kohl started his fine arts studies in Luxembourg-City at the Lycée des Arts et Métiers under Lucien Wercollier (1945–1948), then continued at the École nationale supérieure des arts décoratifs (1948–1952) and the École nationale supérieure des Beaux-Arts (1953–1955) in Paris. He went on to forge a distinguished career as a fine artist in his native country, being awarded twice the coveted Prix Grand-Duc Adolphe (in 1956 and 1962). He participated in numerous collective international exhibitions but also regularly exhibited at individual exhibitions.

Fresh from his studies, Charles Kohl took on teaching in 1956 as assistant professor of arts at first at the Lycée des Arts et Métiers, and later (in the 1970s and 1980s) at the Lycée Technique du Centre in Luxembourg City. Concurrently, he worked as a book illustrator, as a poster designer for Luxembourg's National Lottery, and as cartoonist at the magazine Revue (under the nickname "Carlo"), but more importantly as an independent artist from his artist's studio in Bonnevoie. He secured a number of important commissions for monuments and sculptures, several of them in churches throughout Luxembourg.

In his early sixties, arthritis -brought about by years of chiseling marble and granite- started to plague his shoulders, so Kohl reluctantly gave up working the hard stone and concentrated on working in terracotta and on drawings/paintings.

Towards the end of the 1990s, Charles Kohl started to suffer from macular degeneration. His deteriorating health implied that he could no longer live by himself and so he moved in 2010 into a home for the blind in Berschbach. In spite of his vision being down to a mere 4% in the last year of his life, he still produced drawings up to a couple of months before his death on 3 January 2016.

== Critiques ==
As a sculptor, Kohl was best known for his works in marble frequently showing veiled forms, but also for his bronzes and his mixed media drawings, which "with their often fragmentary bodies and faceless heads, created a stylized human anatomy symbolizing both the vulnerability and the power of body and soul", and which have earned him a reputation as "Illustrator of the human condition". During the private view of the Charles Kohl retrospective in Luxembourg's Villa Vauban -held online because of the pandemic- the critic Paul Bertemes called Charles Kohl: "Either a particularly three-dimensional painter, or a particularly well-drawn sculptor".

Upon his death in 2016, the Luxemburger Wort declared "Luxembourg's art scene is grieving for a virtuoso artist with a remarkable sensitivity".

Throughout 2020, the Villa Vauban devotes a major retrospective to the artist whom the Luxemburger Wort called "An illustrious unknown". The Luxemburger Wort reviewed "The timeless and tortured sculptures of Charles Kohl", while Redlion and RTL called him "one of Luxembourg's most important sculptors."

== Selection of public works ==
- some of the bas-reliefs at the National Resistance Museum in Esch-sur-Alzette (in conjunction with Claus Cito and Emile Hulten) (1956)
- Statue of Jean Bertels on the old bridge in Echternach (1966)
- War memorial in Contern (1967)
- Bronze war memorial at the cemetery in Slonsk (Sonnenburg) (1986)
- Paul Eyschen Memorial in Diekirch (1961)
- Henri Godefroid Memorial in Rodange (1961)
- The marble baptismal font in the parish church in Bonnevoie (1962)
- The marble altar, tabernacle, lectern and baptismal font in the church in Cessange (1962)
- The wooden crucifix in the church in Hunsdorf (1966)
- Marble sculpture outside the Lycée technique des arts et métiers (Limpertsberg) (1977/78)
- Marble haut-reliefs on the Lycée de garçons de Luxembourg in Luxembourg-City
- 3 marble steles outside the École de commerce et de gestion (ECG) Luxembourg-City (1987)

== Exhibitions of Charles Kohl's works ==
=== Individual exhibitions ===
- 1967 Galerie Interart, Luxembourg
- 1977 Galerie Paul Brück, Luxembourg
- 1984 Galerie de Luxembourg
- 1987 Galerie de Luxembourg
- 1990 Galerie de Luxembourg
- 1993 Galerie de Luxembourg
- 1994 Galerie de Luxembourg
- 1996 Galerie L'Indépendance, Luxembourg, Banque Internationale à Luxembourg
- 1999 Galerie de Luxembourg
- 2003 Galerie de Luxembourg
- 2020–2021, Villa Vauban, Luxembourg (posthumous)

=== Collective exhibitions ===
- 1952-65 Salon du C.A.L. (Cercle Artistique de Luxembourg)
- 1953 Peintres et Sculpteurs Luxembourgeois, Musée de Lyon
- 1959 I^{re} Biennale de Paris, Musée d'Art moderne
- 1959 Galerie “Le Studio”
- 1960 Bianco e Nero, Lugano
- 1961 VI^{e} Biennale São Paulo, Musée d'Art Moderne
- 1962 Art et Poésie, Orangerie, Mondorf
- 1962 Sculpture Contemporaine, Carrara
- 1963 Galerie Paul Brück, Luxembourg
- 1963 Salon de la petite sculpture européenne, Madurodam
- 1965 Comptoir de Lausanne
- 1966 VIII^{e} Biennale de Middelheim, Antwerpen
- 1967 14 Artistes du Grand-Duché de Luxembourg, Wolluwé Saint-Lambert
- 1968 Petite sculpture du Benelux, Madurodam
- 1968 I^{re} Quinquennale de l'Art Moderne Luxembourgeois, Esch-Alzette
- 1971 Artistes du Grand-Duché de Luxembourg, Arlon
- 1973 II^{e} Biennale Internationale de la petite sculpture, Budapest
- 1973 II^{e} Quinquennale d'Art Moderne Luxembourgeois, Esch-Alzette
- 1973 Putzgalerie Art multiple
- 1973 L'Art actuel au Benelux, Amersfort
- 1974 7 artistes Actuels Luxembourgeois, Ghent
- 1976 Premier Salon International de l'Art Contemporain, Grand Palais, Paris
- 1983 III^{e}Quinquennale d'Art Moderne Luxembourgeois, Esch-Alzette
- 1984 Sculptures + Objets, Villa Vauban, Luxembourg
- 1988 Peintres Luxembourgeois, Rathaus, Cologne
- 1990 Centre A. Borschette, Brussels
- 1990 Centre Européen, Luxembourg
- 1991 Maison de la Culture, Moscow

== Bibliography ==
- Les 2 Musées de la Ville de Luxembourg, 9782919878178/Charles-Kohl-1929-2016---Dessins-et-sculptures--Zeichnungen-und-Skulpturen: Charles Kohl (1929-2016) - Dessins et sculptures / Zeichnungen und Skulpturen Monography of the artist. 200 pages, ISBN 978-2-919878-17-8. (30/3/2020)
- Thierry Hick, Charles Kohl: Un illustre inconnu wort.lu, 9 June 2020, p. 20-21
- Becker, N., 2016. Décès de Charles Kohl. L'imagier de la condition humaine. Luxemburger Wort 5 January 2016
- Luxtimes dated 4.1.2016, Talented Luxembourg sculptor dies
- Silva, Sonia da, Les lauréats du Prix Grand-Duc Adolphe de 1946 à nos jours: hommage et incitations, Éditions Saint-Paul, 2013, p. 102
- Marc Theis & Elisabeth Vermast, 1995. Artistes luxembourgeois d'aujourd'hui. Éditions Marc Theis, Luxembourg / Hannover, 1995, p. 72-73.
- Lucien Kayser, Carnet culturel Charles Kohl, d'Lëtzebuerger Land, 22.05.1987
- Jean-Paul Raus, A la galerie „Le Studio" Coryse Kieffer, Charles Kohl, Yola Reding et Ben Heyart, d'Lëtzebuerger Land, 10.04.1959
- L.K., Die besten Bilder, d'Lëtzebuerger Land, 21.09.1956

== External sources ==
- www.charleskohl.com, website made by Charles Kohl's family to celebrate the artist's creative output
