= Prix Grand-Duc Adolphe =

The Prix Grand-Duc Adolphe (Grand-Duke Adolphe Prize) is a Luxembourgian art award awarded every year to one or more artists exhibiting at the Salon Artistique of the Cercle artistique de Luxembourg (CAL).

The award is named after Grand Duke Adolphe of Luxembourg who created the prize in 1902, on the initiative of his wife Adelheid-Marie of Anhalt-Dessau, who herself was a painter.

== Award recipients ==
- 1902: Jean Mich, Sculptor.
- 1903: No prize awarded.
- 1904: Dominique Lang and Frantz Seimetz, Painters.
- 1905: Albert Breisch, Goldsmith.
- 1906: Guido Oppenheim, Painter.
- 1907: Auguste van Werveke and Jean Curot, Painters.
- 1908: Joseph-Germain Strock, Painter.
- 1909: Jean-Baptiste Wercollier and Claus Cito, Sculptors.
- 1910: Paul Wigreux, Architect.
- 1911: Pierre Blanc, Painter.
- 1912: No prize awarded.
- 1913: Angélina Drumaux, Painter, and Etienne Galowich, Metal artist.
- 1914: Nicolas Birnbaum and Pierre Kipgen, Applied artists.
- 1915: André Thyes, Painter.
- 1916: Eugène Mousset, Painter.
- 1917: Jean-Pierre Koenig, Architect.
- 1918: Auguste Trémont, Painter.
- 1919: Dominique Lang, Painter.
- 1920: Frantz Heldenstein, Sculptor.
- 1921: No prize awarded.
- 1922: Jean-Pierre Beckius, Painter.
- 1923: Michel Haagen, Metal artist.
- 1924: Jean Schaack and Joseph Kutter, Painter.
- 1925: Eugène Kurth, Painter.
- 1926: Félix Corrent, Painter-Engraver.
- 1927: Joseph Meyers, Painter.
- 1928: Albert Kratzenberg, Sculptor.
- 1929: Léon Nosbusch, Sculptor.
- 1930: Marcel Langsam, Metal artist.
- 1931: Jean-Pierre Lamboray, Art teacher.
- 1932: Albert Kratzenberg, Sculptor.
- 1933: Mathias Reckinger, Art professor.
- 1934: No prize awarded.
- 1935: Aloyse Bové, Architect.
- 1936: Michel Stoffel, Painter.
- 1937: Simone Lutgen, Sculptor.
- 1938: Félix Glatz, Art professor.
- 1946: Will Kesseler, Painter.
- 1947: Frantz Kinnen, Painter.
- 1948: Aurelio Sabatini, Sculptor.
- 1949: No prize awarded.
- 1950: Will Kesseler and Frantz Kinnen, Painter.
- 1951: Edmond Goergen, Painter.
- 1952: Charlotte Engels, Sculptor.
- 1953: Coryse Kieffer, Painter.
- 1954: Jean-Pierre Calteux and Henri Dillenburg, Painter.
- 1955: No prize awarded.
- 1956: Frantz Kinnen, Painter and Charles Kohl, Sculptor.
- 1957: Emile Hulten, Sculptor.
- 1958: Will Dahlem and Jean-Pierre Junius, Painter.
- 1959: Emile Kirscht and Alphonse Nies, Painter.
- 1960: Roger Bertemes and Jean-Pierre Thilmany, Painter.
- 1961: No prize awarded.
- 1962: Ben Heyart, Painter and Charles Kohl, Sculptor.
- 1963: Yola Mersch-Reding, Painter.
- 1964: Marie-Thérèse Juchem-Kolbach and Roger Koemptgen, Painters.
- 1965: Alfred Steinmetzer, Painter.
- 1966: No prize awarded.
- 1967: Jean Leyder, Painter.
- 1969: Roger Kieffer, Paul Reichling and Joseph Grosbusch, Painters.
- 1970: Michel Breithoff and Gust Graas, Painters.
- 1971: Roger Dornseiffer, Arthur Unger and Edouard-Marie Weber, Painters.
- 1972: Roger Roemer, Painter.
- 1973: Fernande Klein and Joseph Welter, Decorative artists.
- 1974: No prize awarded.
- 1975: Henri Kraus, Painter.
- 1976: Ota Nalezinek, Painter.
- 1977: Fränz Hulten, Painter.
- 1978: No prize awarded.
- 1979: Gérard Claude, Aquarellist.
- 1980: Sylvie-Anne Thyes, Graveur.
- 1981: Albert Haas, Sculptor.
- 1982: Charles Reinertz, Painter.
- 1983: Andrée Wirion, Applied artist.
- 1984: Ferd Medinger and Paul Roettgers, Painters.
- 1985: No prize awarded.
- 1986: No prize awarded.
- 1987: Marc Frising, Engraver.
- 1988: No prize awarded.
- 1989: Annette Weiwers-Probst, Painter.
- 1990: Jeannot Lunkes, Painter.
- 1991: No prize awarded.
- 1992: Marie-Josée Kerschen, Sculptor.
- 1993: No prize awarded.
- 1994: No prize awarded.
- 1995: Patricia Lippert, Painter.
- 1997: Jeannot Bewing, Sculptor.
- 1999: Anna Recker, Painter.
- 2001: Isabelle Lutz, Painter.
- 2003: Sonja Roef, Painter, Sculptor.
- 2005: Luc Ewen, Photographer.
- 2007: Miikka Heinonen, Photographer
- 2009: Dani Neumann, Painter
- 2013: Carine Kraus, Painter

== See also ==
- List of European art awards
