= Saint Michael's Church, Luxembourg =

Roman Catholic church in Luxembourg City, Luxembourg

Coordinates: 49°36′41″N 06°08′05″E

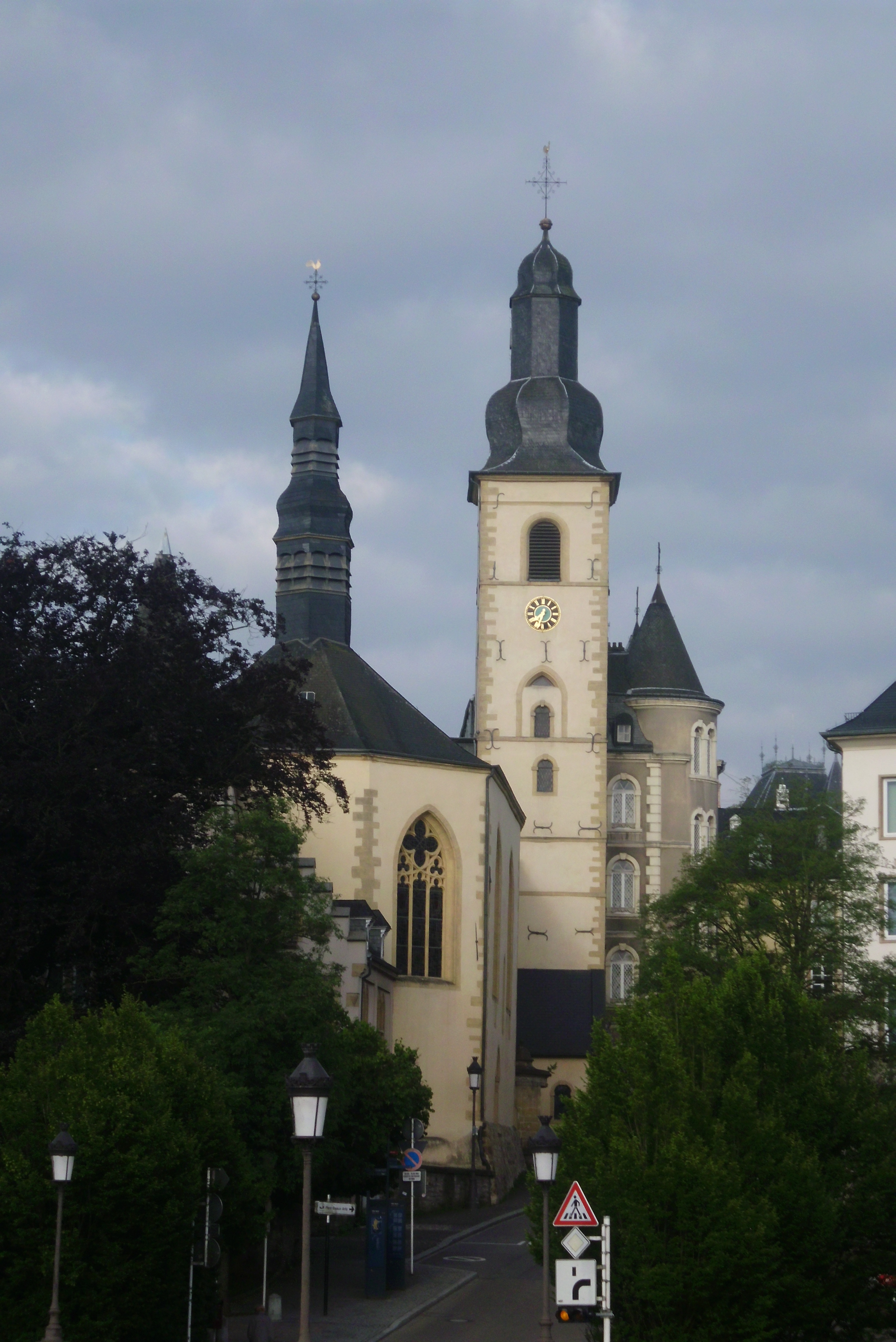
Saint Michael's Church stands on the oldest religious site in the city.

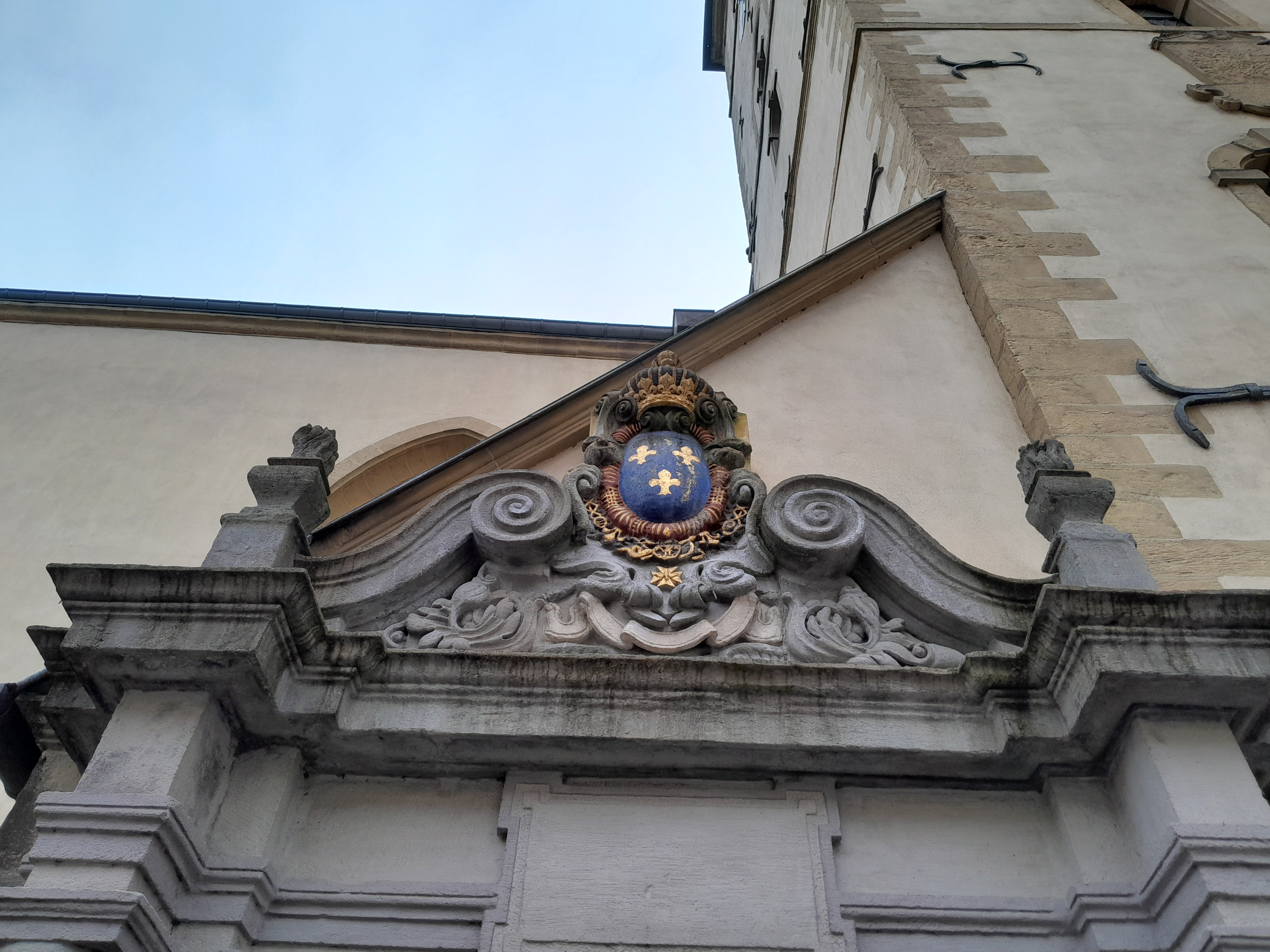
Church lintel

Saint Michael's Church (Luxembourgish: Méchelskierch, French: Église Saint-Michel, German: Sankt Michaelskirche) is a Roman Catholic church in Luxembourg City, in southern Luxembourg. It is located in Fishmarket, in the central Ville Haute district.

The church is the oldest extant religious site in Luxembourg City. The first church was built on the spot in 987 as the castle chapel for the Count of Luxembourg. However, over the following centuries, the building was destroyed, rebuilt, and renovated several times. Its current appearance dates to 1688, and unites Romanesque and Baroque architectural styles, pre-dating the national Moselle Baroque style. The building has been restored since then, preserving its original form; it has most recently been renovated in the 1960s, 1980s, and 2003–2004.

== See also ==
- Saint Michael: Roman Catholic traditions and views
