= The Dam =

1913 painting by Dominique Lang

- Le barrage (French)
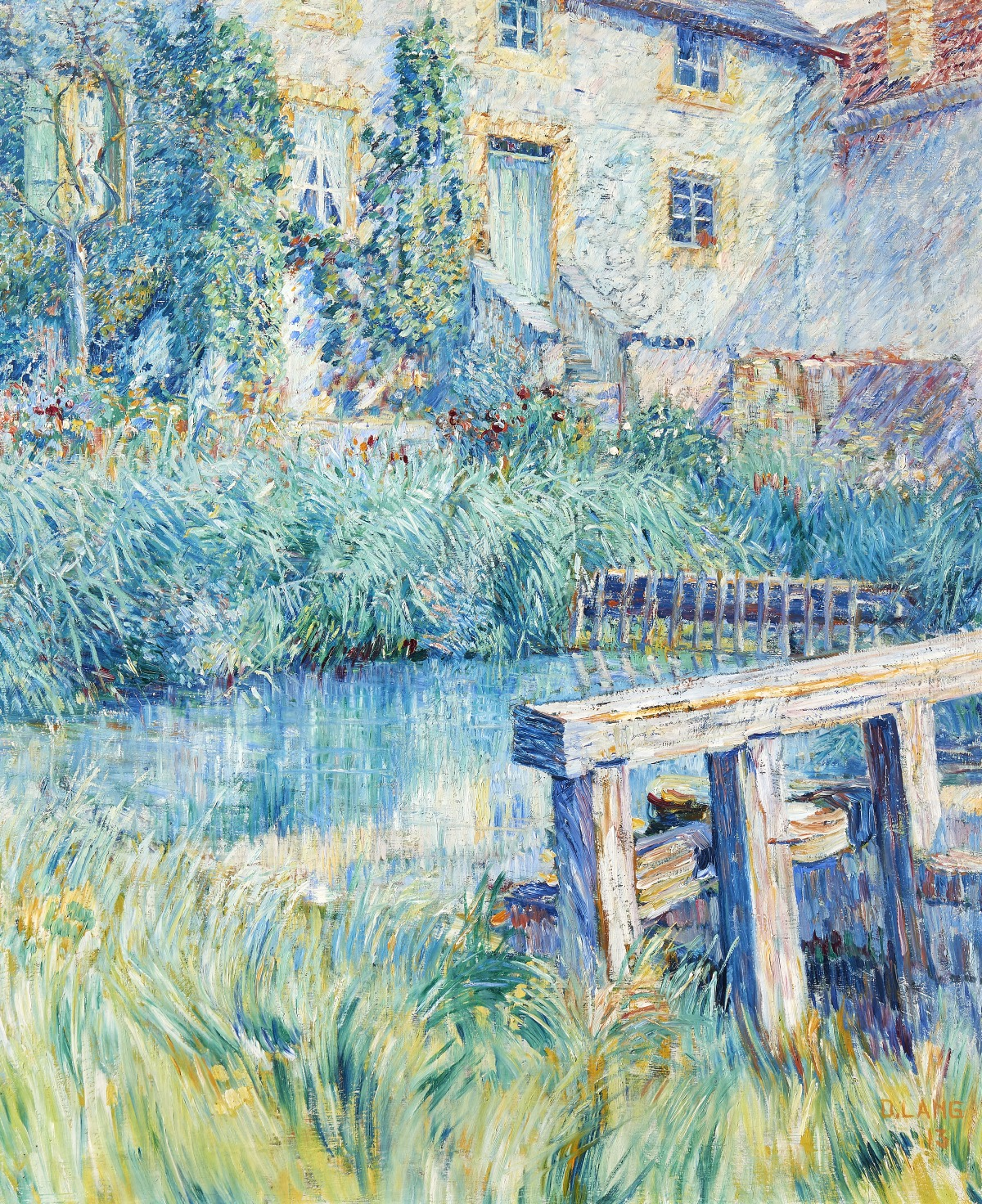
- Artist: Dominique Lang
- Year: 1913
- Medium: oil on canvas
- Dimensions: 80.5 cm × 67 cm (31.7 in × 26 in)
- Location: National Museum of History and Art; Luxembourg

The Dam (in French:Le barrage) is a painting by Luxembourg artist Dominique Lang from 1913.

== Description ==
The 80.5 cm × 67 cm (31 3/4 in × 26 1/2 in) picture is part of the collection of the National Museum of History and Art in Luxembourg.

== Analysis ==
Dominique Lang was the only representative of Luxembourg in the first exhibition of the Impressionists in Paris.

After completing his education at the Academy of Fine Arts in Antwerp in 1900, he began to paint in a symbolist style. After 1912–1913, he began using more refined technique and painted many landscapes in rural areas, where he lived. The Dam was shown at the Salon des Indépendants, 1914, where he received good feedback on the work and creativity. He managed to recreate the refraction of sunlight into the colors of the rainbow. His sense of nature and authenticity continued the tradition of Claude Monet and Pierre-Auguste Renoir. His landscapes evoke the world without industrialization.
