= Luxembourg City Hall =

City hall of Luxembourg City, Luxembourg

Coordinates: 49°36′36.74″N 06°07′49.64″E

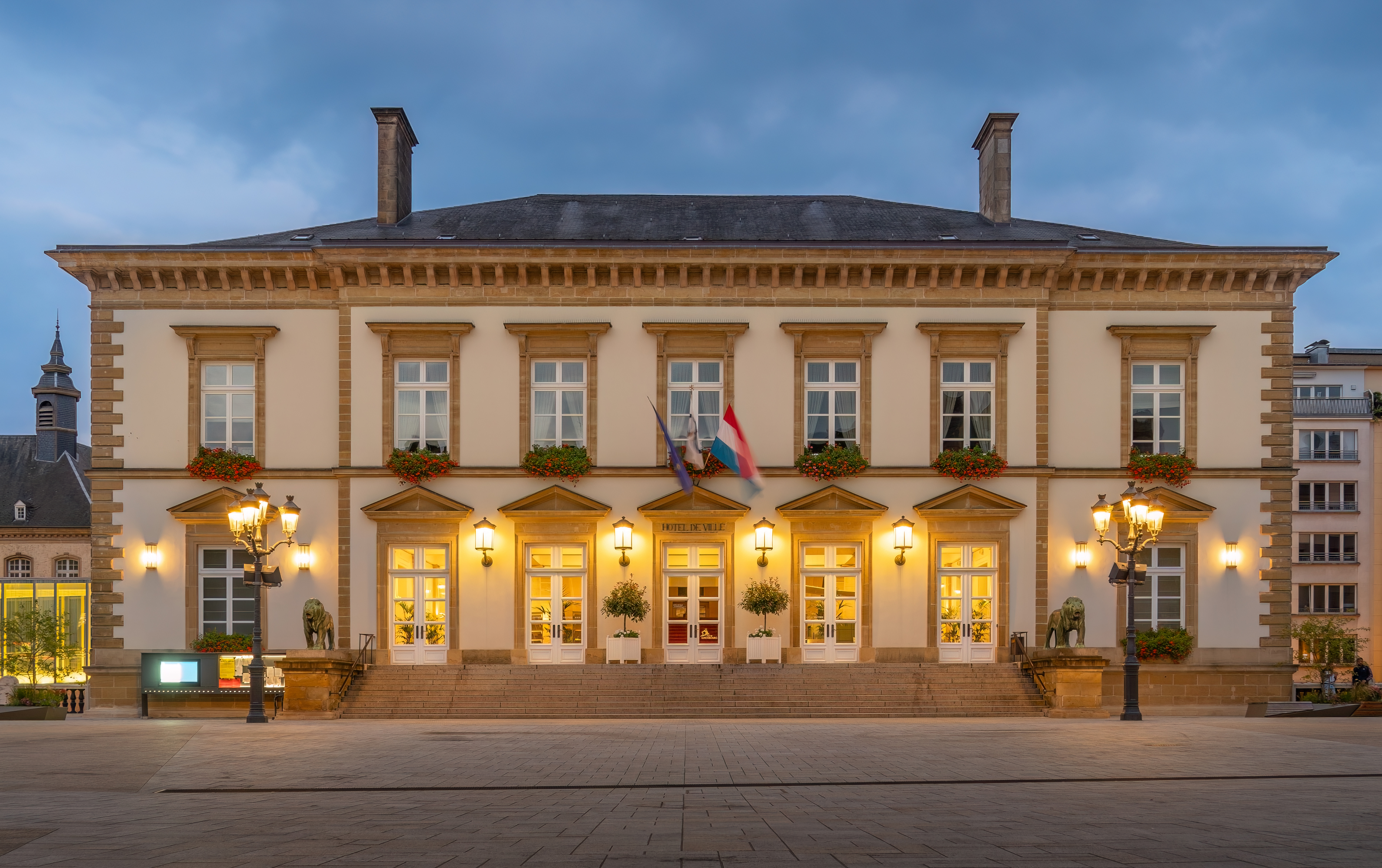
Luxembourg City Hall (2024)

Luxembourg City Hall (French: Hôtel de ville de Luxembourg [otɛl də vil də lyksɑ̃buʁ]; Luxembourgish: Stadhaus Stad Lëtzebuerg) is the city hall of Luxembourg City, in southern Luxembourg. The city hall is the centre of local government, including being used as the private office of the Mayor of Luxembourg City. Because of its position in Luxembourg's capital, it regularly hosts foreign dignitaries. It is located on the southwestern part of Place Guillaume II (nicknamed Knuedler), the main square in the centre of the city.

The two-storey building is built in neoclassical style.

== History ==
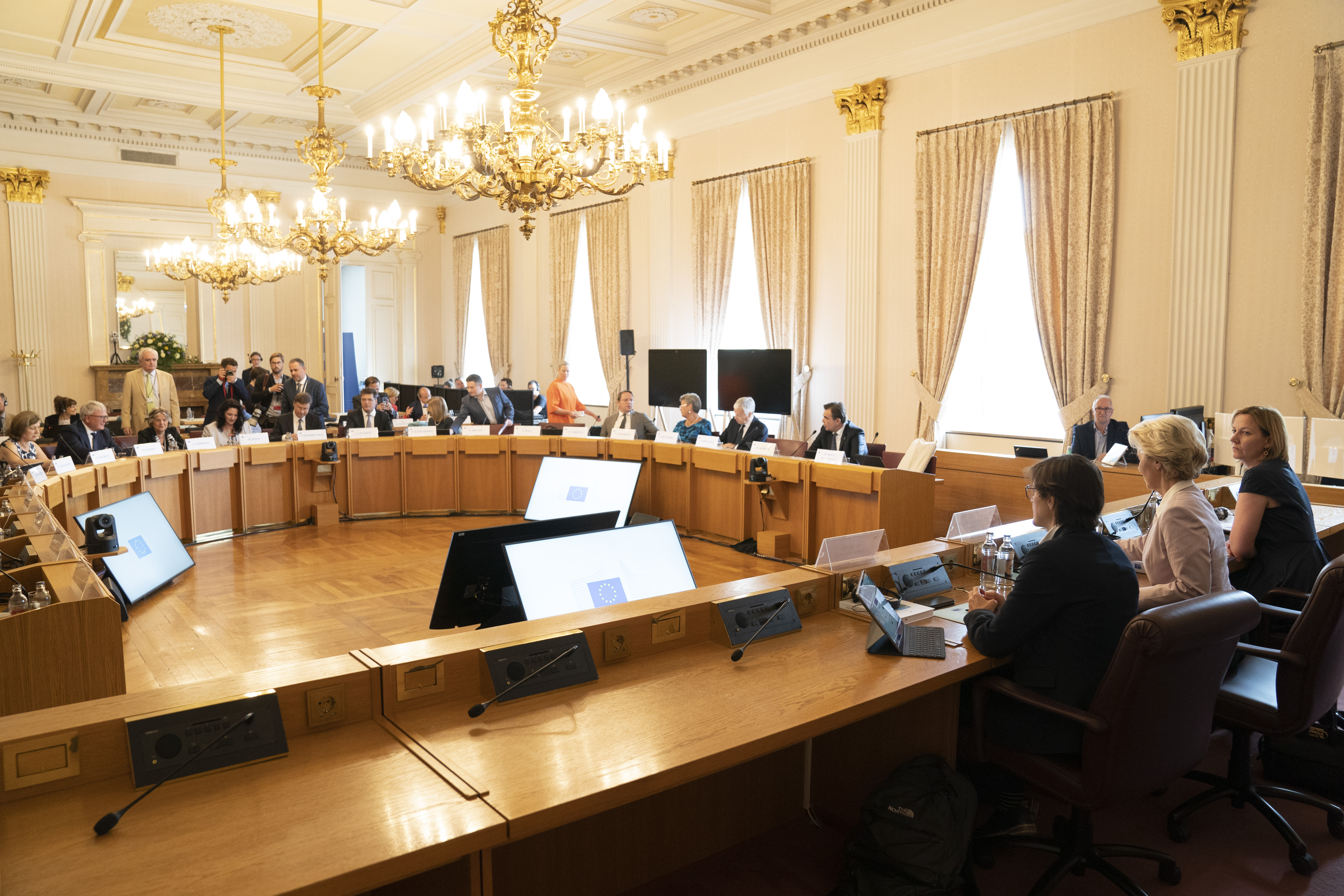
The meeting room of the Luxembourg Communal Council at City Hall

Until 1795, the Place Guillaume II was home to a monastery of Franciscan friars, At the time, Luxembourg's town hall was the current Grand Ducal Palace, located just to the east of Place Guillaume II, on Krautmaart. The French invasion during the French Revolutionary War heralded a seizure of the monastery, and the beginning of the use of the Grand Ducal Palace for central government purposes. As a result, for three decades, the municipal headquarters were moved around the city, without adequate accommodation.

Ever since Napoleon had given the site of the monastery to the city, plans had been afoot to build a purpose-built city hall. These plans finally came to fruition in 1828, when a design by Liège-based Justin Rémont was given the go-ahead. The following year, the old monastery, which had fallen into disrepair, was deconstructed, with much of the material going towards building the new city hall, construction of which began in 1830. Construction continued through the Belgian Revolution, with Luxembourg City (protected by its German garrison) remaining the only part of the Grand Duchy outside the control of the rebel forces.

The building was completed in 1838, and first used for a city council, chaired by Mayor François Scheffer, on 22 October 1838. Due to the ongoing Belgian Revolution, the city hall could not be opened by the King-Grand Duke. Consequently, the official unveiling had to wait until 15 July 1844, when William II also unveiled the equestrian statue to himself on the same Place Guillaume II (which is named in his honour). In 1848, the City Hall hosted the Constituent Assembly (from 29 April onwards), which wrote the new national constitution.

The building went without major changes until 1938, with the addition of two sculptures of lions, which flank the entrance, designed by Luxembourger Auguste Trémont. During the German occupation of the Second World War, the German occupiers converted the basement from market halls into offices, greatly increasing the amount of office space in the building. After the war, the building played host to the first meeting of the High Commission of the European Coal and Steel Community, chaired by Jean Monnet on 8 August 1952.
