= National Museum of Archaeology, History and Art =

Coordinates: 49°36′43″N 06°07′59″E

- Nationalmusée fir Archeologie, Geschicht a Konscht
- Location: Fishmarket, Luxembourg City, Luxembourg
- Type: Art museum
- Website: www.nationalmusee.lu//en/

The National Museum of Archaeology, History and Art (Luxembourgish: Nationalmusée fir Archeologie, Geschicht a Konscht, French: Musée national d'archéologie, d'histoire et d'art, German: Nationalmuseum für Archäologie, Geschichte und Kunst), abbreviated to MNAHA, is a cultural institution in Luxembourg City, southern Luxembourg.

The institution manages three museum sites and two research centres.

The museum sites are:

- The Nationalmusée um Fëschmaart, which displays artworks and artefacts from all epochs of Luxembourg history. The museum is situated in Fishmarket, the historic heart of the city, in the Ville Haute district.
- The Musée Dräi Eechelen
- The Réimervilla Echternach

The research centres are:

- The Centre de documentation sur la forteresse de Luxembourg
- The Lëtzebuerger Konschtarchiv

== History ==
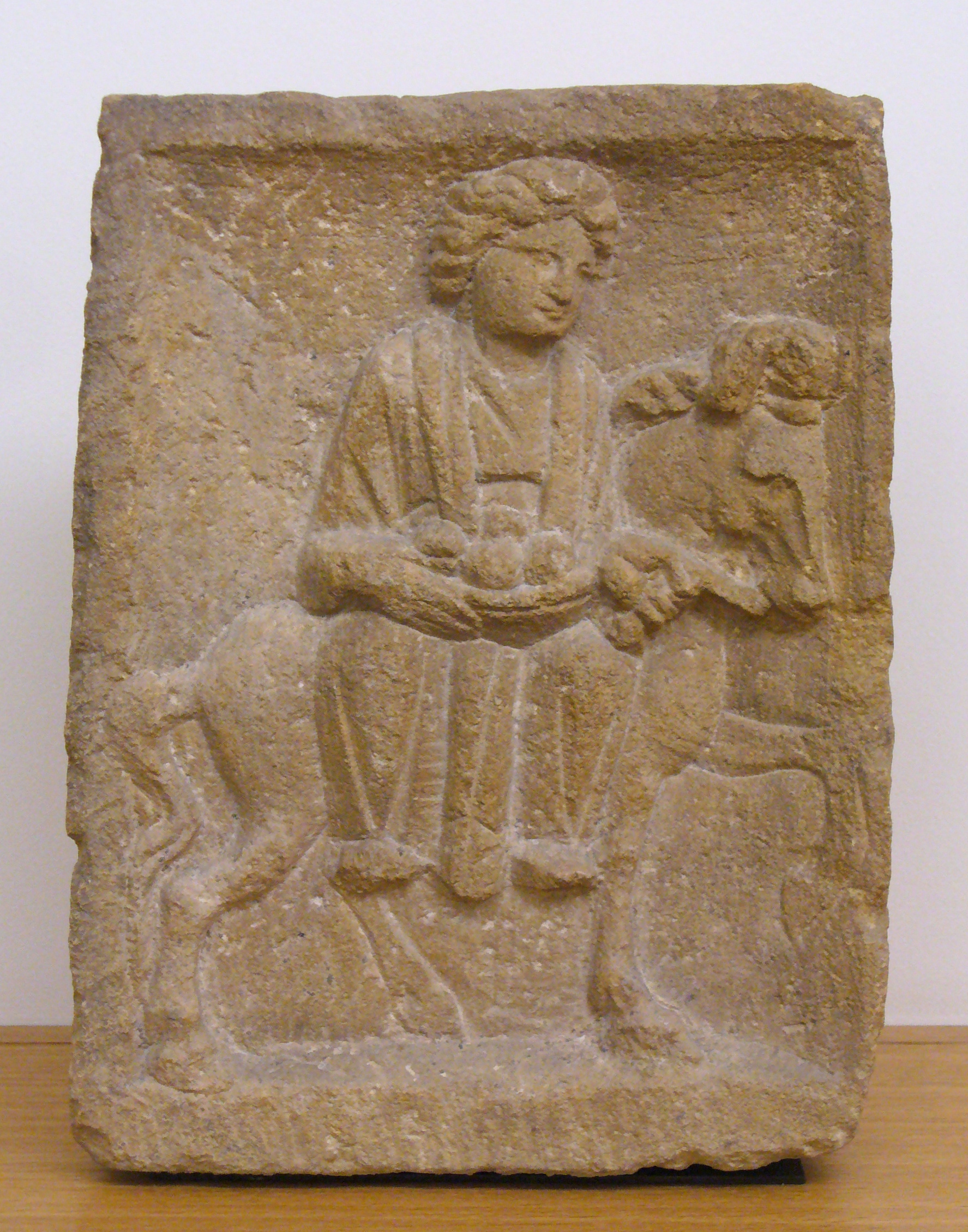
A Roman carving from Dalheim in the museum

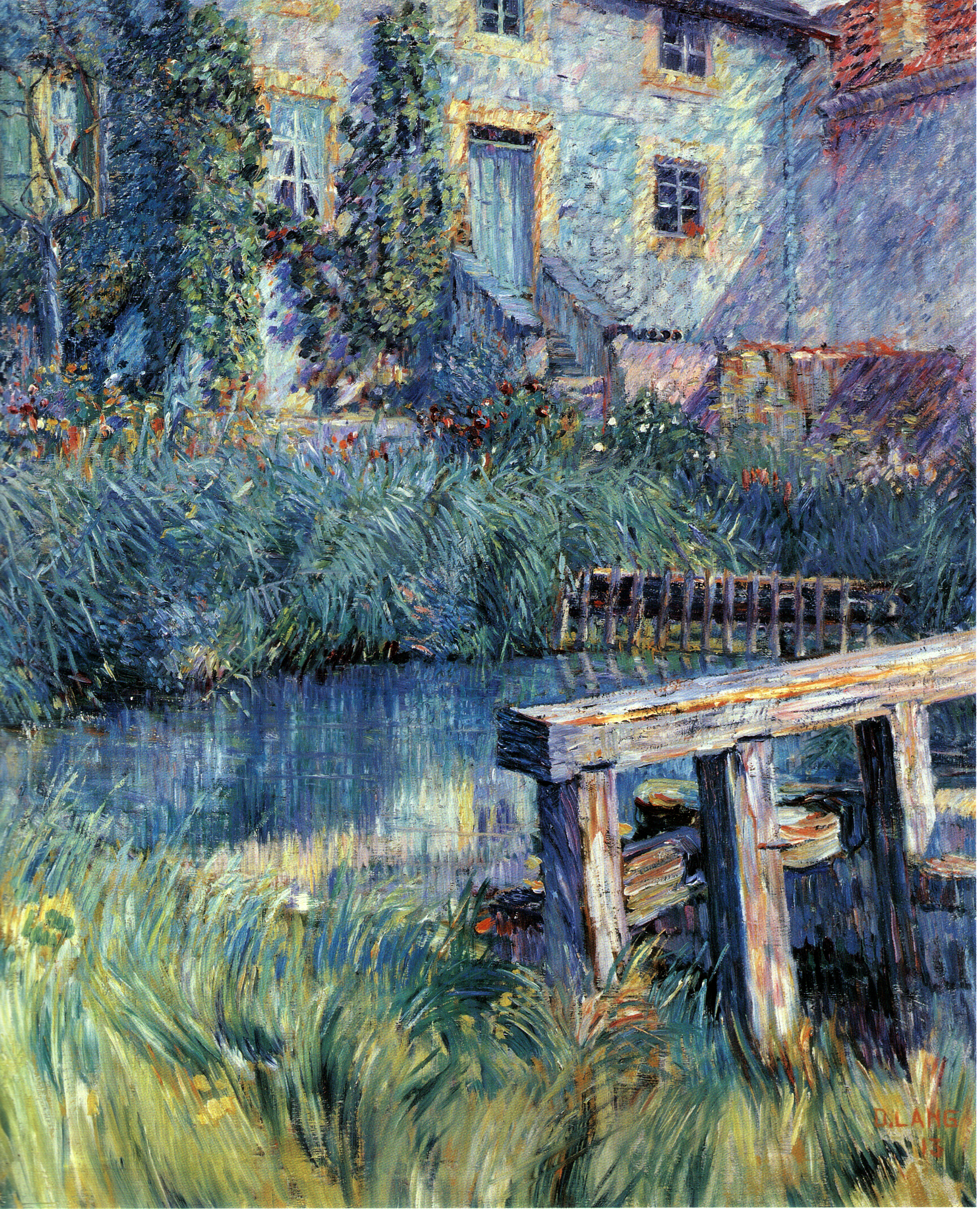
The Dam, 1913, by Dominique Lang, is held in the museum's collection

The first proposal for such a museum was made during the French occupation of the Revolutionary Wars, when Luxembourg was annexed into the département of Forêts. However, the museum was never opened, despite the expropriation of a number of artefacts from the church.

With the affirmation of Luxembourg's independence under the 1839 Treaty of London came a greater interest by native Luxembourgers in promoting the history of their country. In 1845, historians and archaeologists formed the 'Society for the Study and Preservation of Historic Monuments in the Grand Duchy of Luxembourg' (French: Société pour la recherche et la conservation des monuments historiques dans le Grand-Duché de Luxembourg), regularly known as the 'Archaeological Society' (French: Société archéologique). The society took over the responsibility of maintaining a collection of historic antiquities from Luxembourg City's Athenaeum.

In 1868, the society received a boost from the establishment of the Royal-Grand Ducal Institute (French: Institut royal grand-ducal), amongst the responsibilities of which was the conservation of archaeological collections.

In 1939, with World War II beginning, the museum moved its collections to secure them. When the German army invaded Luxembourg on 10 May 1940, the museum was used as a temporary shelter by the Red Cross and Wehrmacht for several months. At the end of 1940, the museum was placed under Nazi control. The Nazis planned to add to the museum's collection to promote their idea of German culture. During the Nazi occupation, from 1940 to 1945, the museum acquired 3,500 items-mostly folk objects. In 1946, the museum reopened as the Luxembourg State Museums; its collections were moved back.

In 1988, the museum was separated into the National Museum of History and Art and the National Museum of Natural History, which moved to a new building in 1996.

The museum has been expanded with a new building designed by Christian Bauer et Associés, opened in 2002.

== Governance ==
- 1939–1964: Joseph Meyers
- 1964–1969: Marcel Heuertz
- 1969–1990: Gérard Thill
- 1990–2005: Paul Reiles
- 2006–2024: Michel Polfer
- from January 2025: Tania Brugnoni
