= Fish Market (Luxembourg City) =

Street and neighbourhood in Luxembourg City

Coordinates: 49.611°N 6.134°E

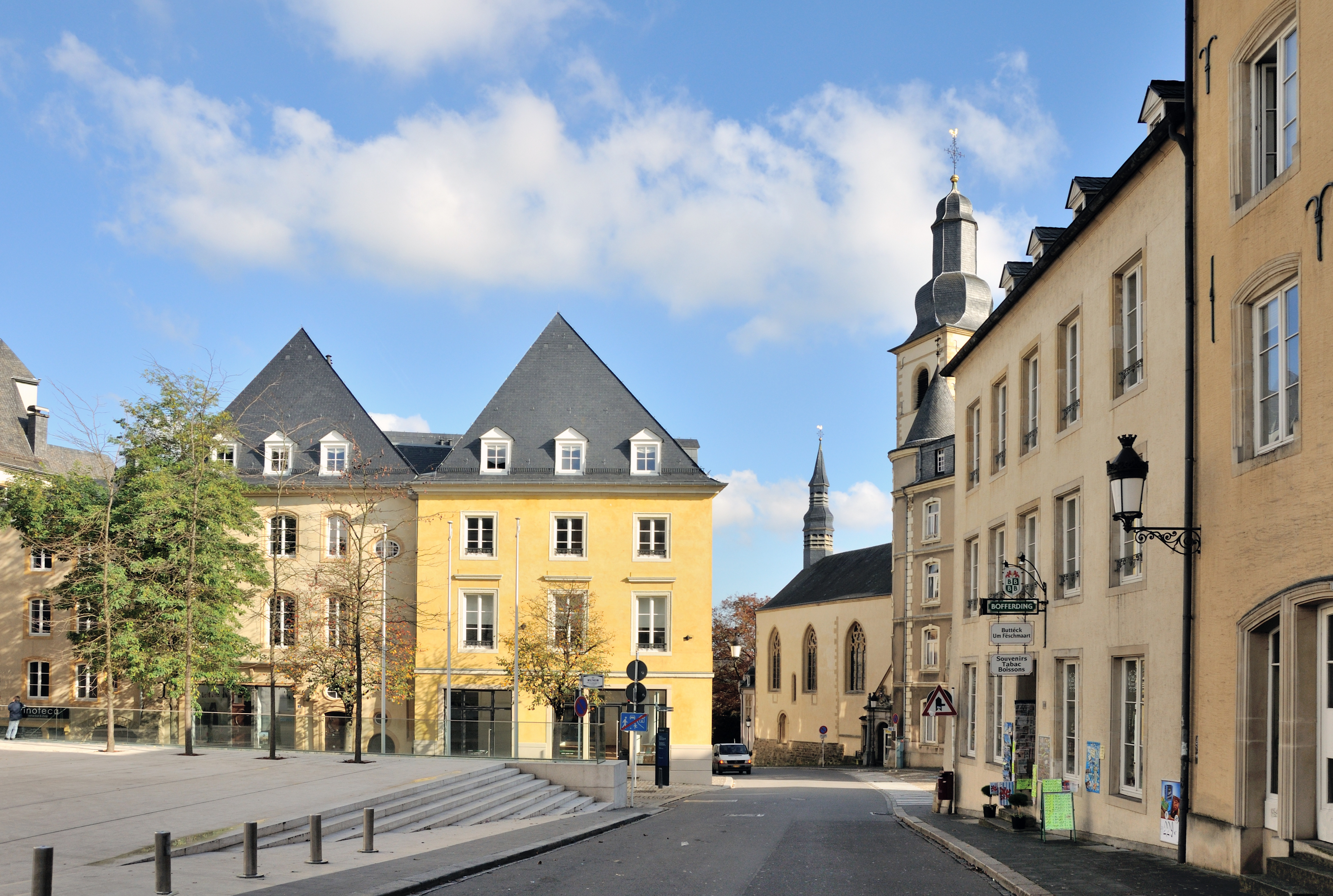
View of the Fëschmaart

The Fish Market (French: Marché-aux-Poissons [maʁʃe o pwasɔ̃]; Luxembourgish: Fëschmaart; German: Fischmarkt [ˈfɪʃmaʁkt]) is a street in Luxembourg City, in southern Luxembourg, that shares its name with the neighbourhood directly surrounding it. It lies in the eastern part of the Ville Haute district.

Built at the junction of two Roman roads, the Fish Market was historically the centre of the city. The name is derived from its use as a marketplace for the sale of fish, along with markets for various agricultural produce (such as cheese), the trade of which was the foundation for Luxembourg's early economy.

It is the home of several buildings and institutions of national importance:

- Council of State
- National Museum of History and Art
- Saint Michael's Church
