= Berschbach =

Coordinates: 49°45′N 6°07′E

Berschbach (German pronunciation: [ˈbɛʁʃˌbax]; Luxembourgish: Bierschbech) is a village in the commune of Mersch, in central Luxembourg. As of 2001, the village had a population of 150.
