= Frantz Seimetz =

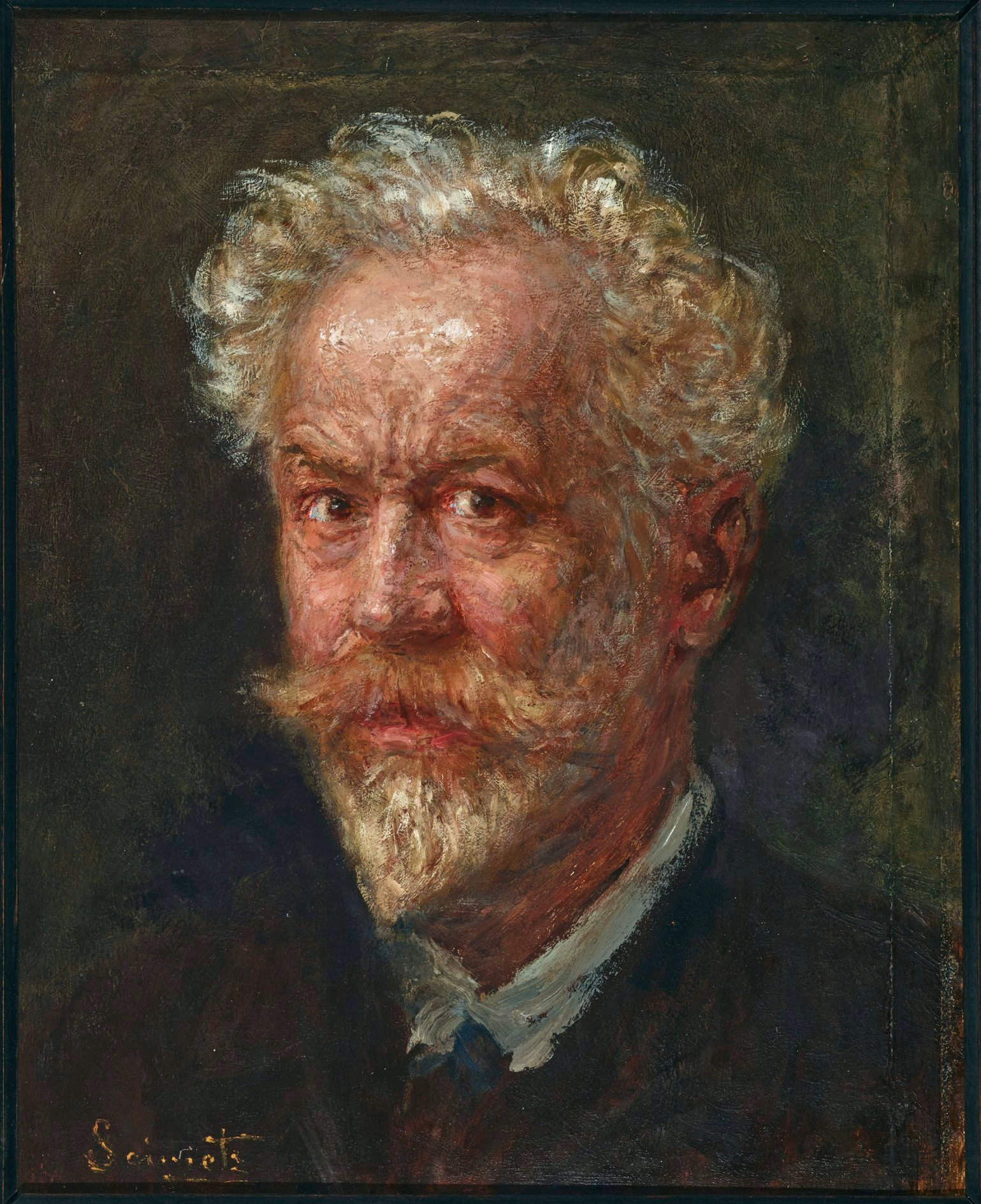
Frantz Seimetz

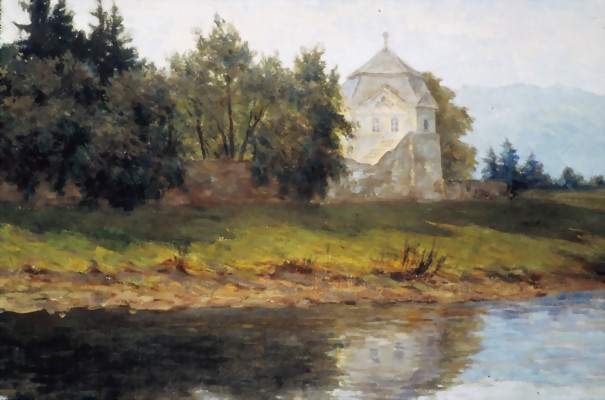
Frantz Seimetz: Pavilion at Echternach

Frantz Seimetz (21 April 1858 – 26 October 1934) was a prolific Luxembourg artist who painted portraits and landscapes in the Impressionist style.

== Early life ==
Born in Grevenmacher on the Moselle, Seimetz first worked as a house painter and decorator until the industrialist Antoine Pescatore noticed his artistic talents and provided support for his education. In 1875, he began his studies in Brussels, continuing at the Munich Academy of Fine Arts (1879–1881) and finally at the French Academy (1881–1887).

== Career ==
Seimetz was a prolific artist, creating over a thousand oils, watercolours and sketches of scenes in Luxembourg City and across the country. His work is however rather irregular compared to that of his friend Jean-Pierre Beckius who is regarded as the national "Moselle painter". His most fruitful period was in Echternach where he painted numerous scenes of the surroundings including the Mullerthal. His pictures are generally realistic and slightly romantic, bordering on Impressionism. Especially after 1900, his style became brighter and more colourful, reflecting the happiness and beauty of the moment he must have experienced.

Seimetz himself was rather like his paintings. He was regarded as something of an eccentric with his full moustache, small beard and curly hair, his floppy hat and flowing clothes. Always optimistic and full of good humour, he led a rather Bohemian yet adventurous life. He travelled to Canada, the West Indies and Mexico. In the United States, he sailed down the Mississippi on a flat boat. His wife, Marie-Antoinette Bourger from Arlon, also a talented artist, did not object to the rather unstable life they led. After Echternach and then Arlon, in 1923 they moved to Luxembourg City where their house packed with old furniture is said to have looked like a museum.

Many of Seimetz' portraits are of exotic figures he met on his travels but there are also excellent paintings of his wife and his Luxembourg friends including Michel Rodange, Sosthène Weis, Michel Engels and Batty Weber. But his masterpiece is generally considered to be his portrait of a fair-haired girl. Many of his self-portraits are reminiscent of Rembrandt and Frans Hals. In 1932, Seimetz painted his last picture. Thereafter he took up writing, first in German, then in Luxembourgish and finally in his Moselle dialect. "Der Feuersalamander" is full of pleasant anecdotes and tales from his younger days as well as his passages describing his political and religious views.

Today Seimetz is remembered as a conscientious artist who dominated the Luxembourg art scene for a considerable time. He was the first Luxembourger to delve into Impressionism and the first, after Nicolas Liez, to paint out in the open air. He was also the first Luxembourger who managed to live from art alone. Seimetz died in Limpertsberg, Luxembourg City, on 26 October 1934.

== Affiliations and awards ==
- 1904, Grand-Duc Adolphe Prize together with Dominique Lang.
