= Auguste Trémont =

Auguste Nicolas Trémont (31 December 1892 – 23 October 1980) was a Luxembourger painter, sculptor, and medallist. He specialised in sculptures of animals, with a particular emphasis on big cats.

== Life ==
After spending his childhood in Luxembourg, Auguste Tremont moved to Paris where he enrolled at the École Nationale des Arts Décoratifs in 1909. World War I caught him by surprise while he was visiting Luxembourg. As he tried to make his way back to Paris by passing through Switzerland, he was arrested by German forces near the Swiss border and was imprisoned. Once released from detention, he returned to Luxembourg where he remained until the end of the war in 1918, working in a steel factory in Dudelange. This work gave him the opportunity to practice his skills by drawing pictures of steel workers in action; he also befriended future Arbed president Aloyse Meyer.

At the end of the war, Trémont returned to Paris where he studied at the École des Beaux Arts. He first specialized in portraits and pictures of Paris and still life. This changed when he visited the Jardin des Plantes, the zoological gardens, where he found the subjects that were to become his main area of specialization: animals. Later in his life, when asked why he chose to represent animals, he replied: “because it was the most difficult task”.

In 1924, Trémont made his first sculptures, and he subsequently developed his skills as a sculptor by creating animal sculptures in a variety of sizes and species. The late 1920s-early 1930s were his most productive years; it is during this period that he sculpted, in Paris, two large lions that now decorate the entrance of the Luxembourg City Hall. He spent World War II in Paris, and returned to Luxembourg at the end of the war where he created monuments for the victims of the war. He later returned to his wonderful detailed still life and oil paintings of flowers and portraits.

Tremont's work was made available to the public through the Ruhlmann art gallery, then later Edgar Brandt and Malesherbes art galleries. His work is also represented on numerous Luxembourgish stamps.

== Major works ==
Works by Trémont adorn some of the most prominent buildings in his hometown of Luxembourg City, including Notre-Dame Cathedral and Luxembourg City Hall. He also created sculptures for the Luxembourgish pavilions at the Brussels 1935 and Paris 1937 World's Fairs.

- 1924: Design of the steelworker (Feiersteppler) for the new Luxembourg 1 and 2 Francs coins.
- 1924: Chimpanzee
- Panther, Couple of Royal Tigers
- 1926-1932: Black Panther, Turning Panther, Serval, Tiger, Elephant, Walking Tiger, Lion, Bison
- 2 lions (Luxembourg City town hall)
- 1932: Côté d'Ivoire Dwarf Buffalo
- Couple of Royal Tigers, Stag (purchased by the City of Paris)
- 1935: Miners (Luxembourgish pavilion of the Brussels World Fair)
- 1936: Religious scenes (Luxembourg Cathedral)
- 1937: Hind (Luxembourgish pavilion of the Paris World Fair)
- 1945: Liberation medal
- Monument to the Dead (Differdange)
- Monument to Dead Soldiers

== Prizes ==
- 1918: Prix Grand-Duc Adolphe
