= Will Kesseler =

Untitled by Will Kesseler

Will Kesseler (17 August 1899 - 21 September 1983) was a Luxembourgish painter, considered to be one of nation’s best Colourists.

After having taught art, he left the country for the former Belgian Congo and Chad, where he was employed as a project manager for various railway construction companies. These periods abroad deeply influenced his very varied artistic production, which includes still life, flowers, Congo and Luxembourg landscapes, figures, nudes and abstract work.

After his rather academic beginnings, the artist, who twice received the Prix Grand-Duc Adolphe (1946 and 1950), turned in 1951 to abstract painting. His Africa inspired gouaches are characterised, as are his other paintings, by expanses of solid colours, pure, vigorous, intense and luminous with strong bold contrasts in which yellow, blue, red and above all contrasting greens dominate. Dynamic geometrical, curving and undulating shapes harmoniously intersect or are superimposed, giving familiar figurative glimpses of tropical vegetation.

== Sources ==
- Lynne Thornton (1990). Les Africanistes: peintres voyageurs, 1860-1960 (in French). ACR Edition. ISBN 9782867700453.
- "Collection of National Museum of History and Art of Luxembourg" (PDF) (in French).
- Wagener, Danièle: Will Kesseler, 1899-1983. Exposition 16 janvier-22 février 1988 à la Galerie d'Art Municipale, Villa Vauban. (Luxembourg, 1988).

== See also ==
- Prix Grand-Duc Adolphe
- List of Luxembourgian people
