= Gust Graas =

Luxembourgish abstract painter (1924–2020)

Gustave Graas (19 December 1924 – 19 February 2020) was a Luxembourgish abstract painter and businessman who played a major role in the development of the Luxembourg-based radio and television group RTL.

== Early life ==
Graas was born in Esch-sur-Alzette in the south of Luxembourg. As a teenager, he was a member of the Hitler Youth. During the German occupation of Luxembourg, he was forced to join the Wehrmacht, but managed to desert. After the liberation, he studied law at Louvain and Paris.

== Business career ==
In 1952, after working as a lawyer in Luxembourg City, Graas joined CLT RTL as secretary general. In 1975, he became director-general and a member of the board. He gave the company a more European dimension and, in 1983, created RTL Television, Germany's first private television station. Graas was also a co-founder of Luxair, Luxembourg's airline, which he headed for over 20 years.

== Artistic work ==
Graas took an active interest in art, producing paintings and works of sculpture. When studying in Paris, he had met several Impressionist painters from the Paris School with whom he maintained contact. In 1970, he was awarded the Prix Grand-Duc Adolphe.

Since his retirement in 1989, he lived in Pollença on the Spanish island of Majorca where he continued to paint. His exhibition Mis años en España (1989-2003) shows how the sun and colours of the island influenced his work. Explaining the background to his art, Graas commented: "My paintings fully express my feelings about life and about life after death".
