= Théo Kerg =

Théo Kerg (2 June 1909 – 4 March 1993) was a Luxembourgish painter and sculptor who specialized in modern art.

== Life ==
Kerg was born to a schoolmaster and his wife in Niederkorn, in south-western Luxembourg and attended school in Esch-sur-Alzette. He moved to Paris in 1929 to study at the École nationale supérieure des Beaux-Arts, the Sorbonne and the Institut d'Art et d'Archéologie. From 1932 to 1933, he studied at the Kunstakademie in Düsseldorf, Germany, under the supervision of Paul Klee and Oskar Moll. He returned to Luxembourg in 1936 to become an art professor.

In 1943, following the German invasion of Luxembourg, Théo Kerg resigned from his position. He was however subsequently arrested in 1944 by the Luxembourgish allied militia, and kept in prison for 15 months as a preventive measure. He left Luxembourg in 1946, aiming to settle in Venezuela, but stopped in Paris where he illustrated a book by Paul Eluard. He permanently settled in Paris, and spent the last three years of his life in Chissey-en-Morvan, in Burgundy, where he died in 1993.

== Art ==
Théo Kerg took part in over 300 group exhibitions and over 150 individual exhibitions. He founded a movement he called "tactilism", whereby a work of art would appear differently depending on the lighting, the atmosphere and other environmental variables.

In Luxembourg, he is remembered especially for his stained-glass windows at the Church of the Holy Spirit in Cents (1975).

== Prizes and recognitions ==
- 1935 Gold Medal at the World Exhibition, Brussels.
- 1950 Hallmark Prize, Paris.
- 1951 First Prize at the Genoa Biennale, section Bianco e Nero.
- 1953 Noceto Prize, San Marino
- 1953 Second Prize at the International Exhibition, Parma.
- 1955 "Un ami des artistes" Prix at the Grand Palais in Paris.
- 1956 "Salon de la Marine" 1955–56 in Paris.
- 1957 Gold Medal at the "VI Mostra Nazionale del Disegno e dell Incisione", Reggio Emilia.
- 1957 French Prize from the Ministère des affaires culturelles, Paris.
- 1958 Mention at the Salon de la Marine, Paris.
- 1958 Prix de la critique belge, Brussels.
- 1968 Silver Medal at the Targa Internazionale "Europa Arte", Ancona.
- 1969 Floralies internationales Prize, Paris
- 1971 Gold Medal for glass design, Montrouge.
- 1971 Signatures Prize, abstract category, First Prize, Cultural Center of Meudon.
- 1971 Grand Prize at the IVe Biennale azuréenne de peinture et de la sculpture, Cannes.
