= Frantz Heldenstein =

Luxembourgish sculptor

Olympic medal record

Art competitions
Silver medal – second place	1924 Paris	Sculpture

François "Frantz" Heldenstein (May 15, 1892 – March 27, 1975) was a Luxembourgish sculptor. He was born in Colmar-Berg and died in Luxembourg City. In 1924 he won a silver medal in the art competitions of the Olympic Games for his "Vers l'olympiade" ("Toward the Olympic Games").
