= Max Kohn =

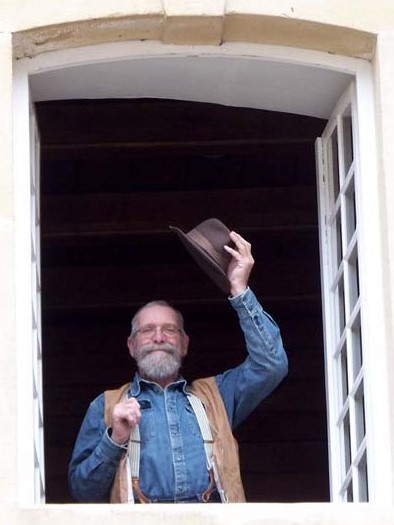
Max Kohn at the vernissage of his exhibition at the Château de Bourglinster, Luxembourg, April 2010

Max Kohn (born 17 November 1954 in Esch-sur-Alzette) is a Luxembourgish painter and sculptor.

Former student at the Institut des Arts et Techniques Artisanales of Namur (Belgium) from 1971 to 1974.

From 1975 to 1981, Max Kohn was a student at the art academy of Karlsruhe (Germany), where he studied sculpture on wood and stone, casting techniques, as well as painting and drawing.

Max Kohn has been a freelance artist working in the Grand Duchy of Luxembourg and France since 1981.

== Single exhibitions ==
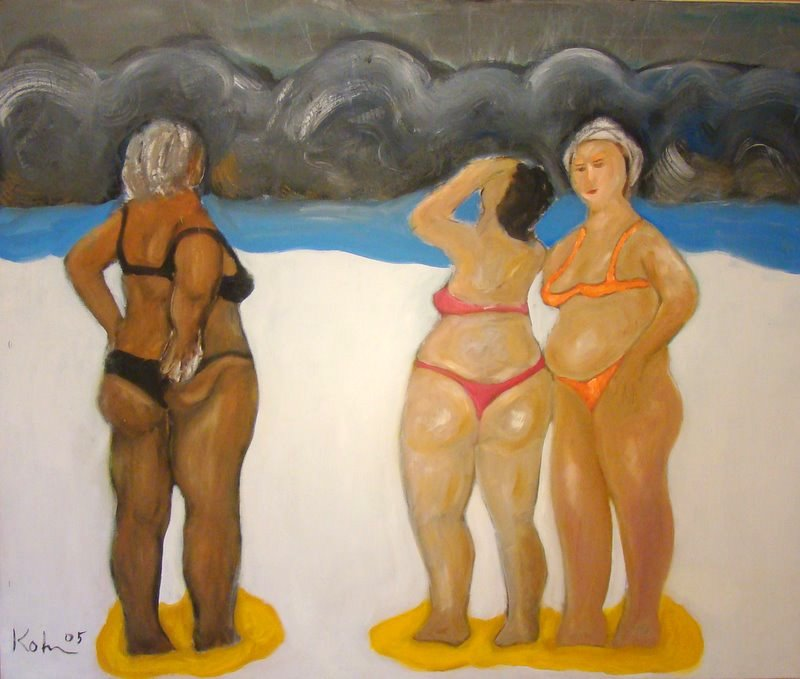
- Tsunami, 2005
  1985 Galerie Weißer Stern, Karlsruhe (D)
- 1987 Galerie Artemos, Bastogne (B)
- 1988 Maison Communale Bastogne (B)
- 1991 Galerie Artline Clervaux (L)
- 1993 Galerie Dat Huisken, Bad Salzuflen (D)
- 1997 Dexia-Bil Diekirch (L)
- 1998 Galerie Schortgen Esch-sur-Alzette (L)
- 1999 Galerie Aradia Hesperange (L)
- 1999 Galerie St Nicolas Remich (L)
- 1999 Tendance Mikado Luxembourg
- 2000 Galerie Harald Lang, Sarrebruck (D)
- 2000 Musée d’Histoire Naturelle (L)
- 2001 Galerie Noodlebärg Basel (CH)
- 2001 Bankhaus Trinkaus und Burckhardt (L)
- 2002 Tour Mahuet Labry, Lorraine (F)
- 2003 Galerie Michel Miltgen (L)
- 2004 Château de Moncel, Jarny, Lorraine (F)
- 2004 Galerie de la ville de Bar sur Seine (F)
- 2007 Galerie Vergolderei von Wedel, Stauffen/Breisgau (D)
- 2008 Hotel Rix (L)
- 2009 Galerie Aradia Hesperange (L)
- 2010 Galerie du Château de Bourglinster (L)

== External sources ==
- Officiel Site of Max Kohn
- Fotos of Max Kohn in the photo archive of Tom Wagner
