= Nicolas Liez =

Luxembourgish painter, sculptor, and architect

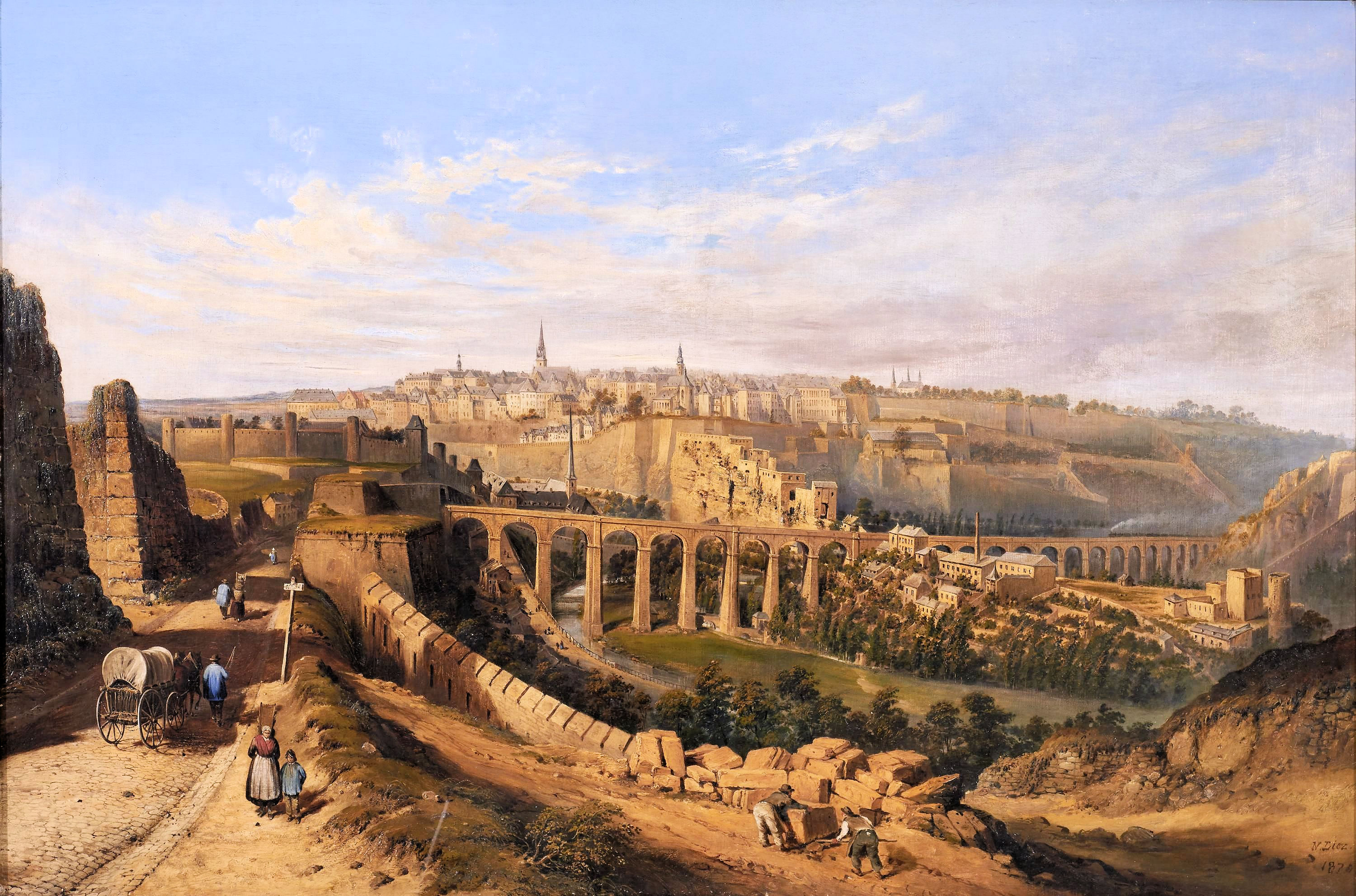
Nicolas Liez: View of Luxembourg from the Fetschenhof (1870)

Nicolas Liez (1809–1892) was a Luxembourgish painter, sculptor and architect who is remembered in particular for his lithographs of scenes throughout the Grand Duchy and for his oil painting of the City of Luxembourg.

== Early life ==
Born in Neufchâteau in the French department Vosges on 14 October 1809, Liez was the son of Marie Weber, a Luxembourger, and Jean-Joseph Liez, a cobbler. In 1812, when he was 3 years old, the family moved to Luxembourg, where his father took up Luxembourg nationality. After attending the local school, Liez studied drawing with Jean-Baptiste Fresez at the Ecole de Dessin where he was awarded the silver medal in 1827. He continued his studies at Charleroi and Mons in Belgium, where he learnt the art of lithography.

== Career ==
Throughout his life, despite his unusual versatility, Liez had difficulty in earning a living from art alone. Despite his work as a painter, lithographer, sculptor and decorator, he still found it necessary to teach, even on Sundays for those who had jobs during the week. He renovated the facades of old buildings and sculpted monuments and gravestones. Liez is also credited with bringing photography to Luxembourg.

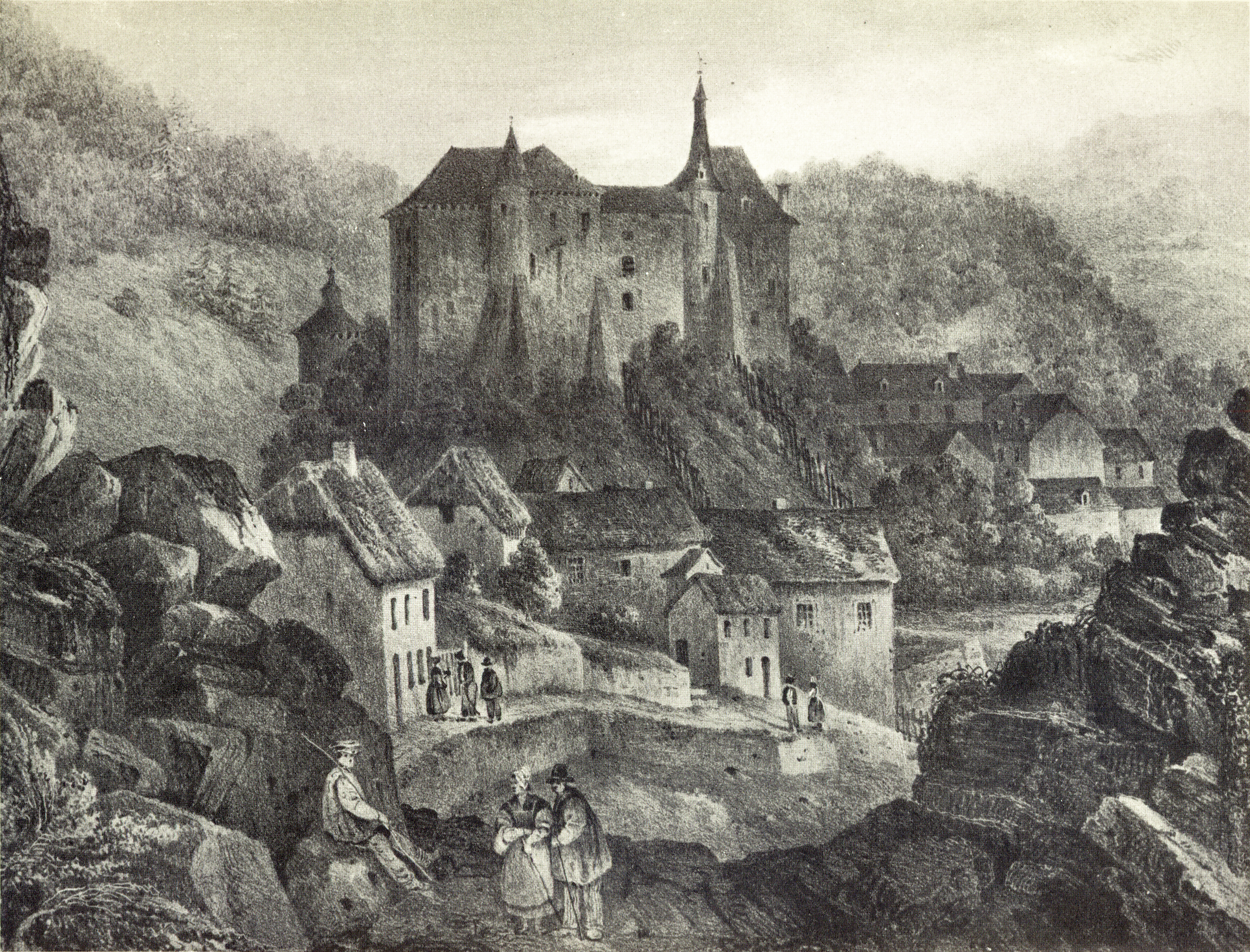
Nicolas Liez: View of Clervaux, lithograph (1834)

His collection of lithographs published in his "Voyage pittoresque à travers le Grand Duché de Luxembourg" (1834) is considered to have been compiled when he was at the height of his artistic ability. The work may well have led to his employment at the Villeroy and Boch pottery factory in Luxembourg City. Here he decorated porcelain with the scenes shown in the lithographs. In 1860, he acquired his own porcelain factory in Audun-le-Tiche but it was a failure and he was forced to sell out. In 1870, he left Luxembourg for Dresden where he became artistic director at the Villeroy and Boch factory there. He died in Dresden on 30 August 1892, leaving four children.

== Artwork ==
Unlike his teacher Fresez, Liez did not master portrait painting but became Luxembourg's most talented graphic artist of the 19th century. His paintings range from his "Death of John the Blind" to landscapes but also include flowers, stations of the cross and horses in their stables. His landscapes depict scenes from Luxembourg, the French Ardennes and the surroundings of Dresden. His most famous work is his view of the City of Luxembourg from the Fetschenhof which he drew, painted and lithographed in 1870. It shows the city at the time when the demolition of the fortress had just begun. Despite his attempt to emphasise the fortifications by exaggerating the height of the cliffs and the railway bridge, the painting is a good representation of the city and its skyscape.

== Bibliography ==
- Nicolas Liez, "Voyage pittoresque à travers le Grand-Duché de Luxembourg". N. Reuter & Cie.; V. Hoffmann, Luxembourg, 1834. (With drawings by Frantz Clément, Jean-Pierre Schmit and Jean-Baptiste Fresez)
- Nicolas Liez, "Voyage pittoresque à travers le Grand-Duché de Luxembourg", pref. Pierre Grégoire, Publisher Ed. Kutter, Luxembourg, 1968 (in French)
- Georges Schmitt, "Nicolas Liez, artiste et artisan luxembourgeois 1809-1892", exposition de son oeuvre au Musée de l'État du 22 au 31 décembre 1960, Publisher Ministère des arts et des sciences, Luxembourg, 1960 (in French)

== Gallery ==
These lithographs by Nicolas Liez were all published in his album Voyage pittoresque à travers le Grand-Duché de Luxembourg (1834).

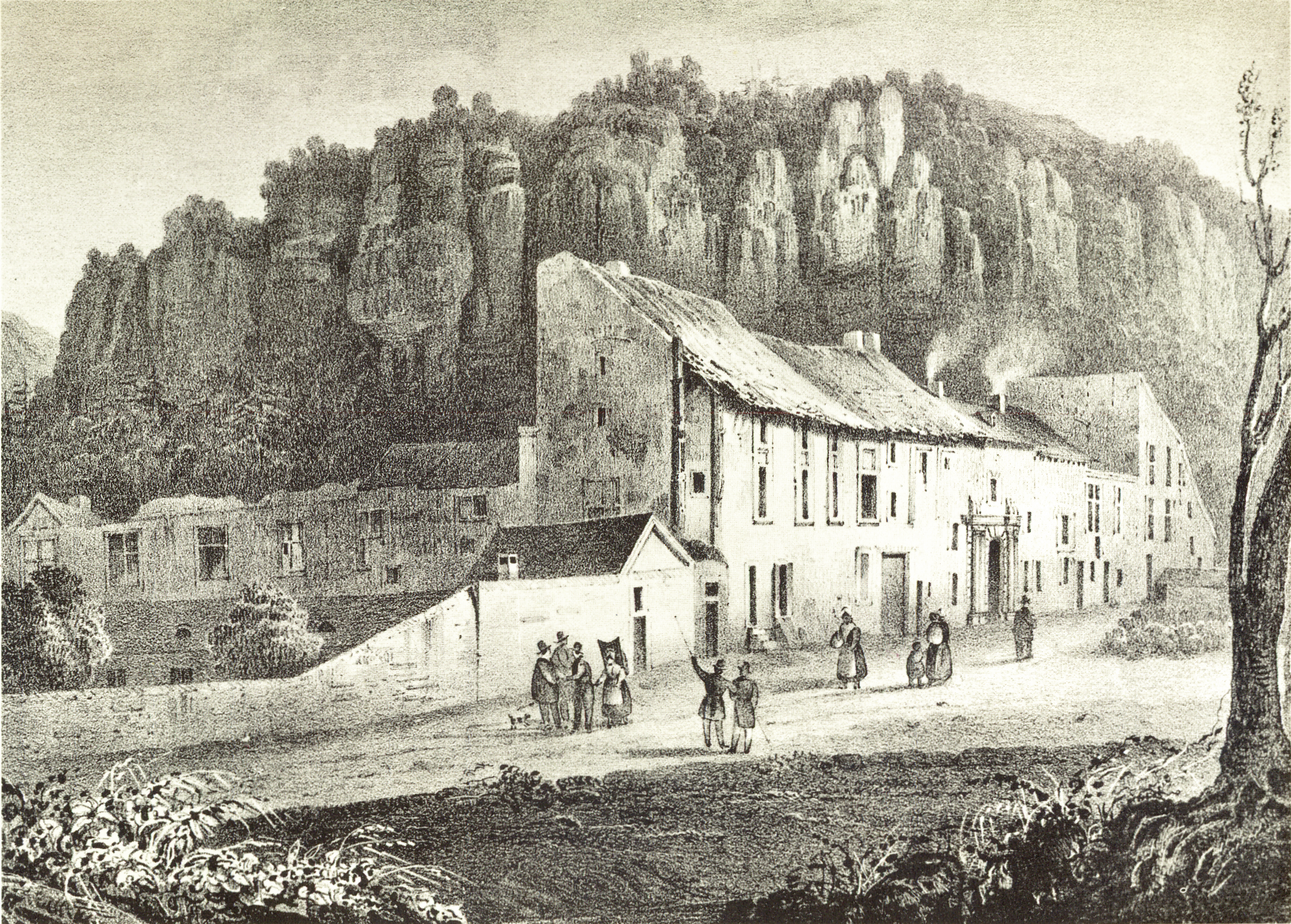
Ruins of Mansfeld Castle, Luxembourg

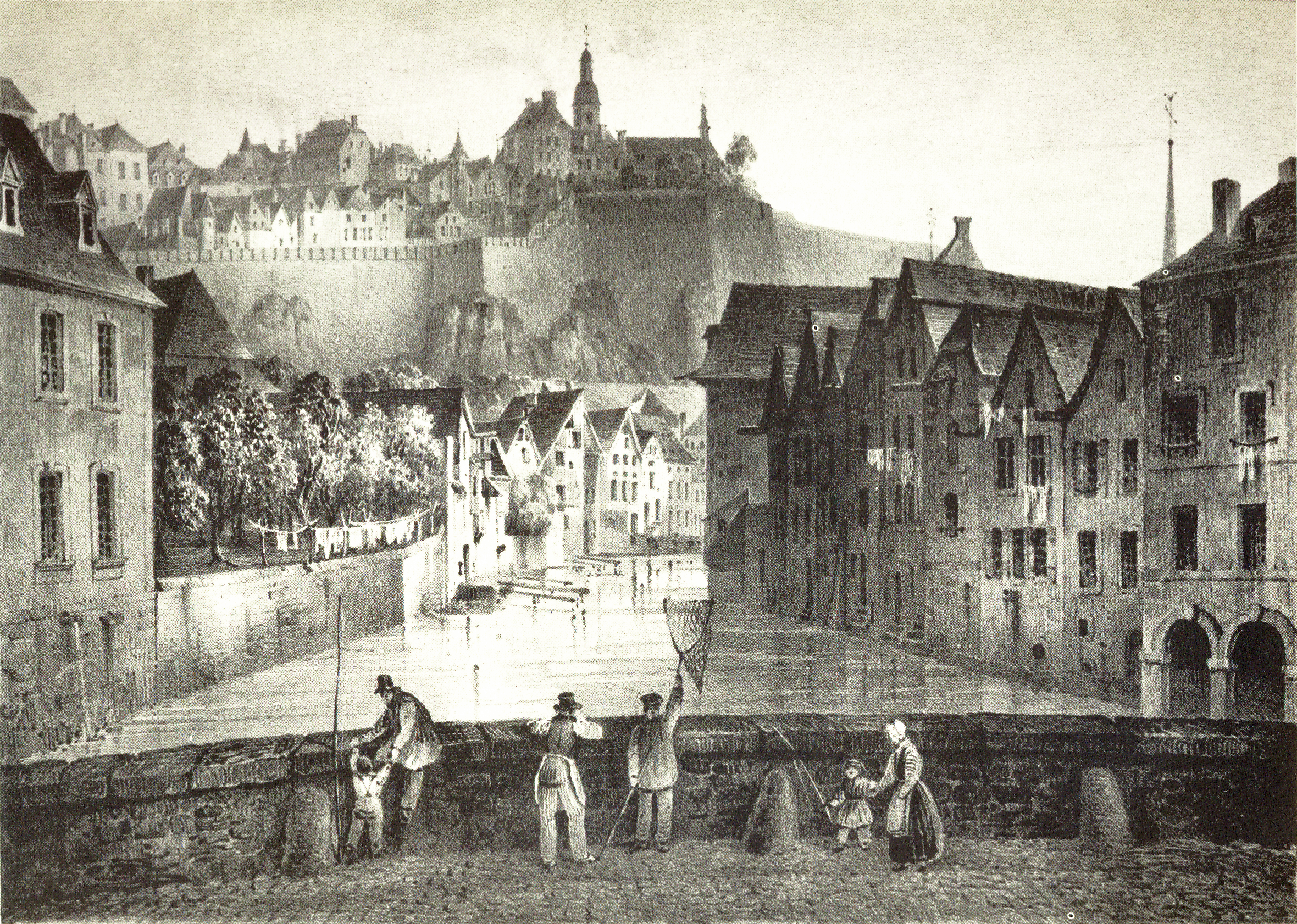
Luxembourg from the Grund

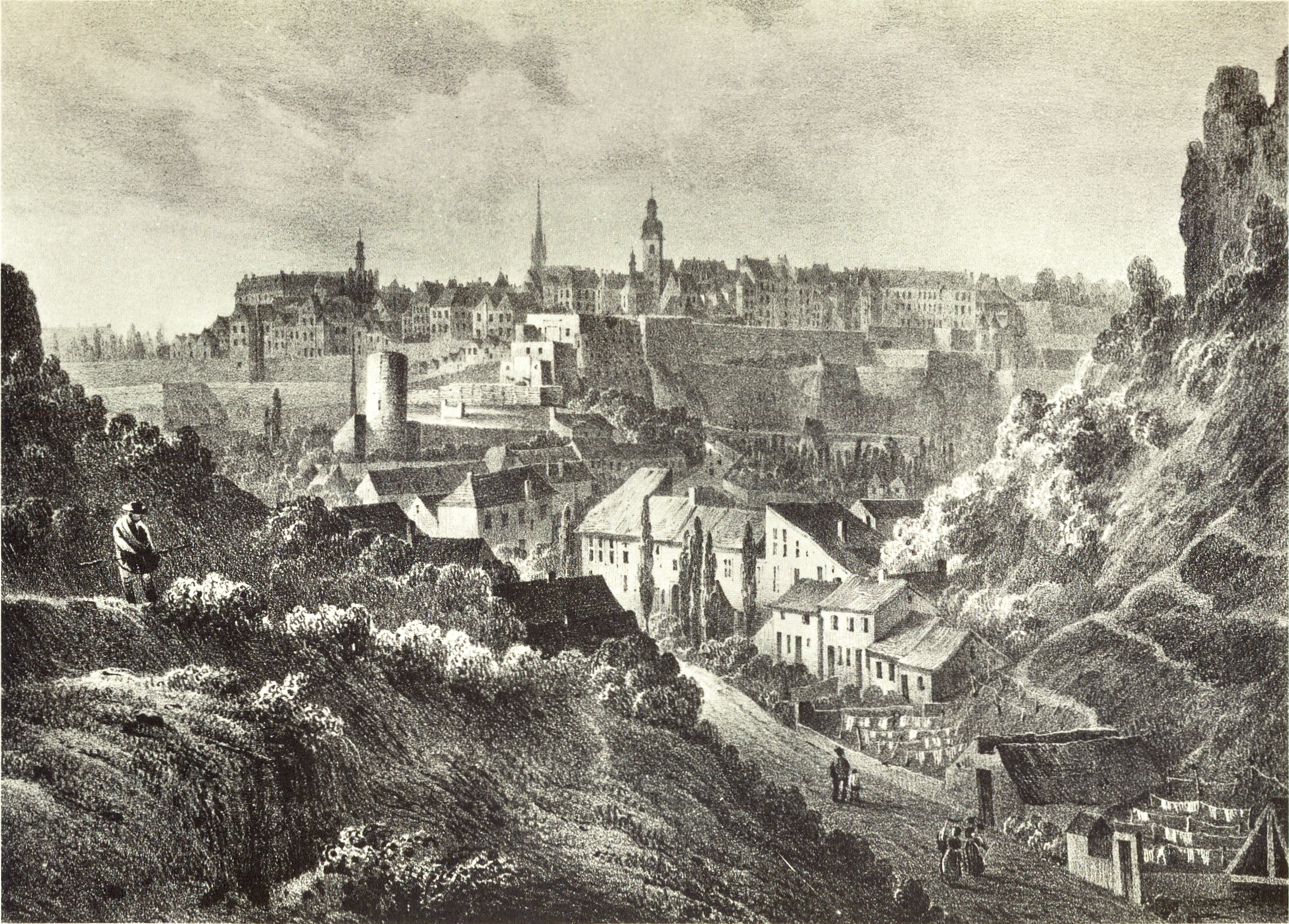
View over Luxembourg City

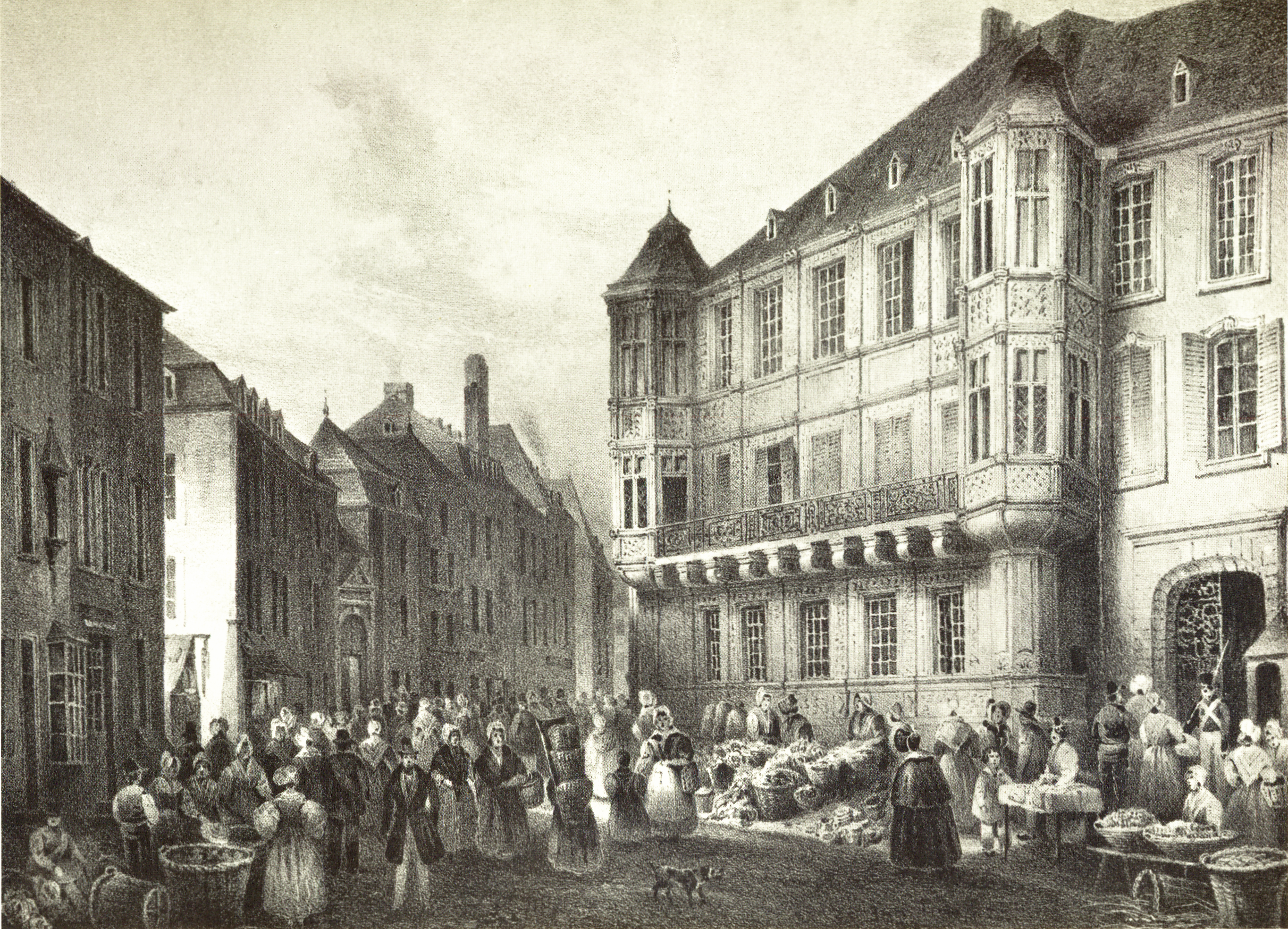
Hôtel du Gouvernement, Luxembourg

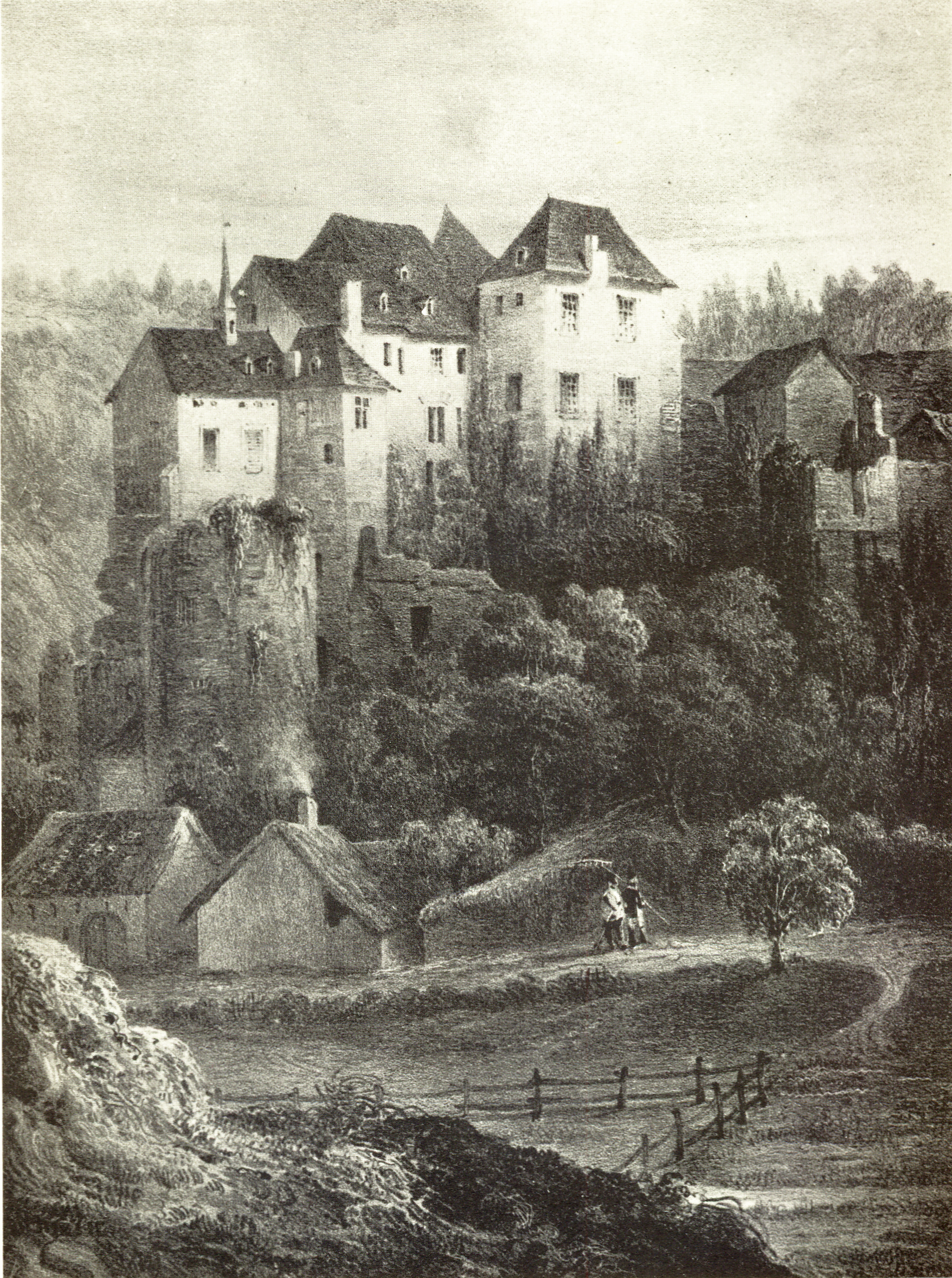
Bourglinster

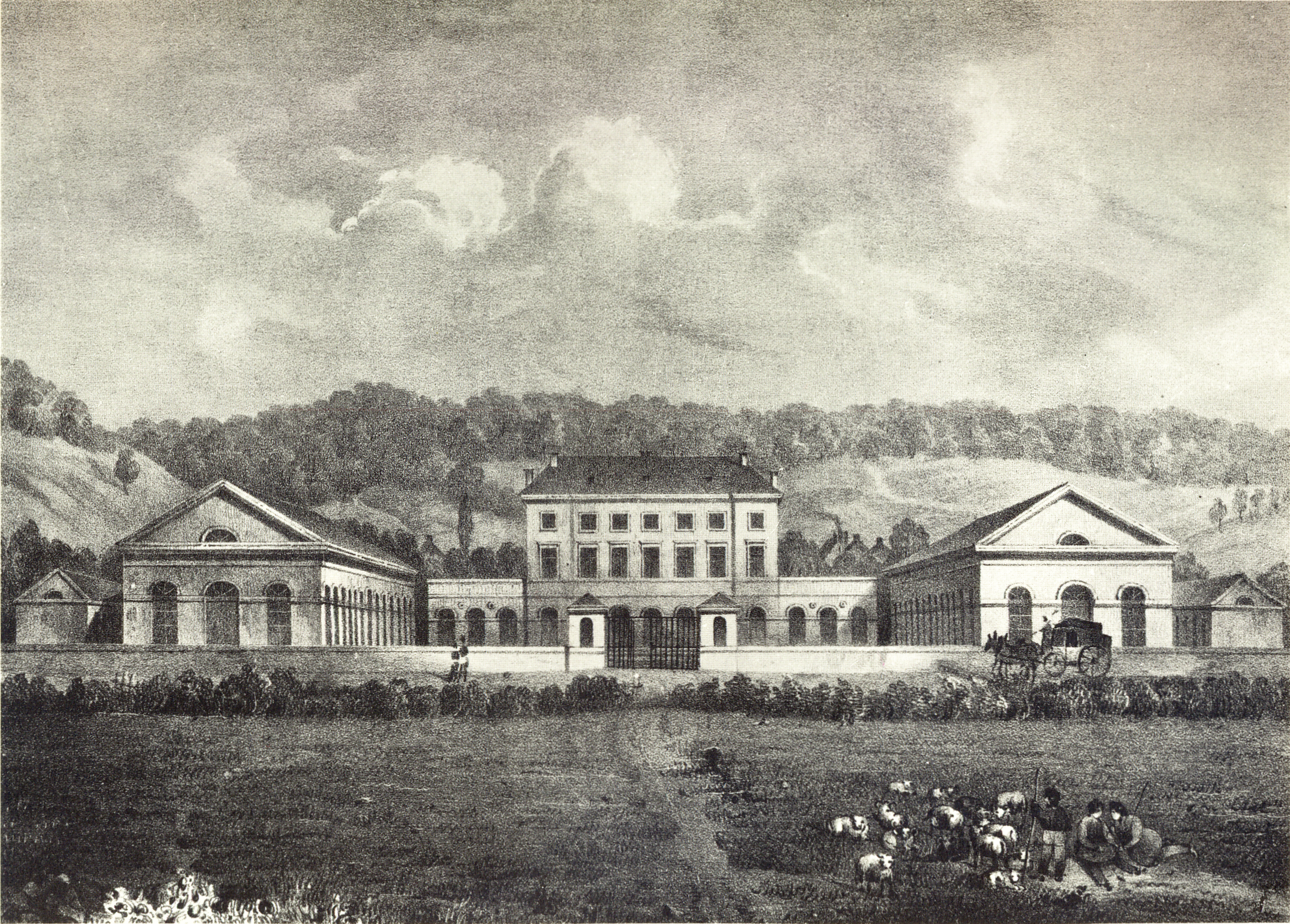
Royal residence with stables Walferdange

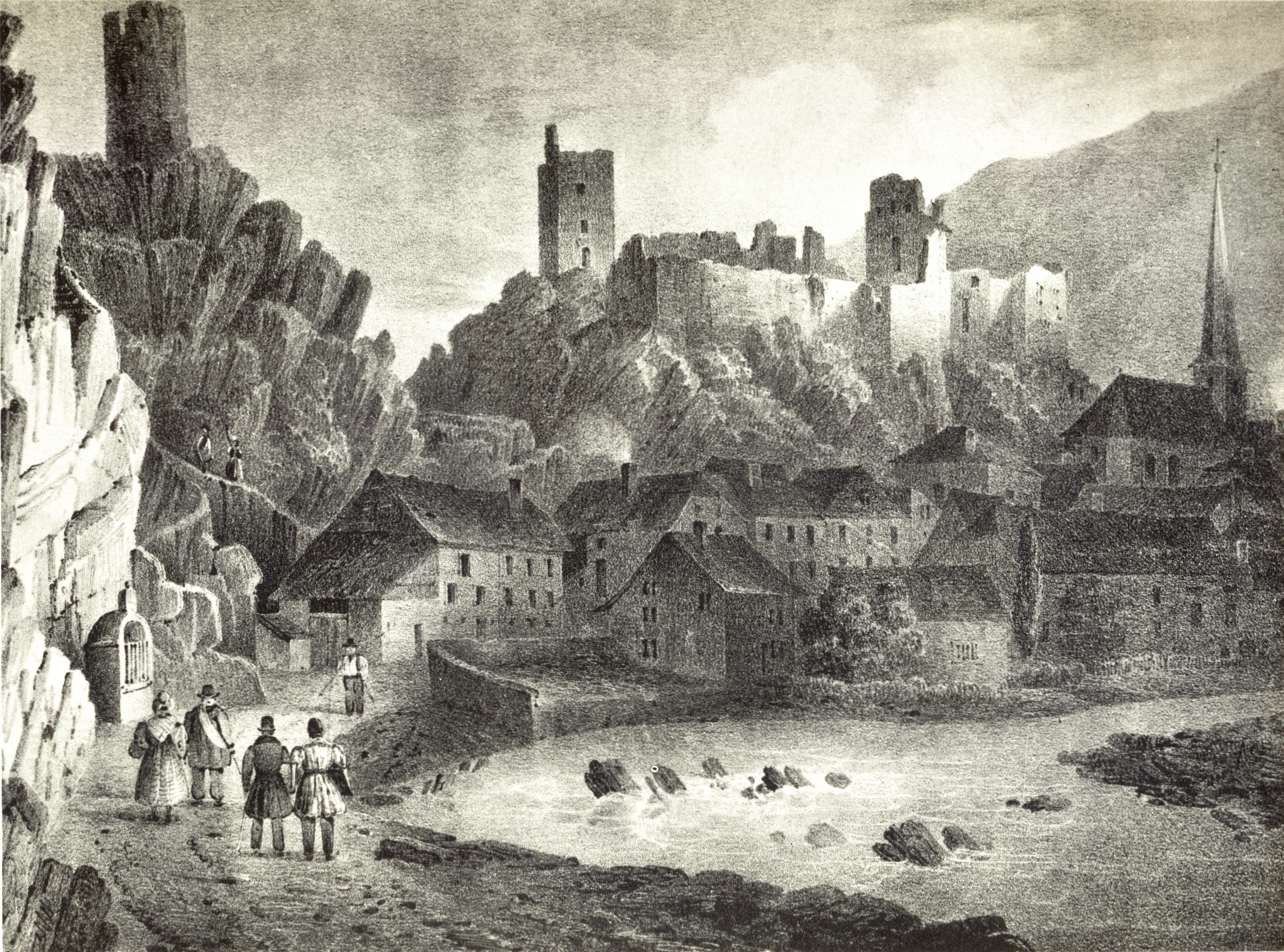
Esch-sur-Sure

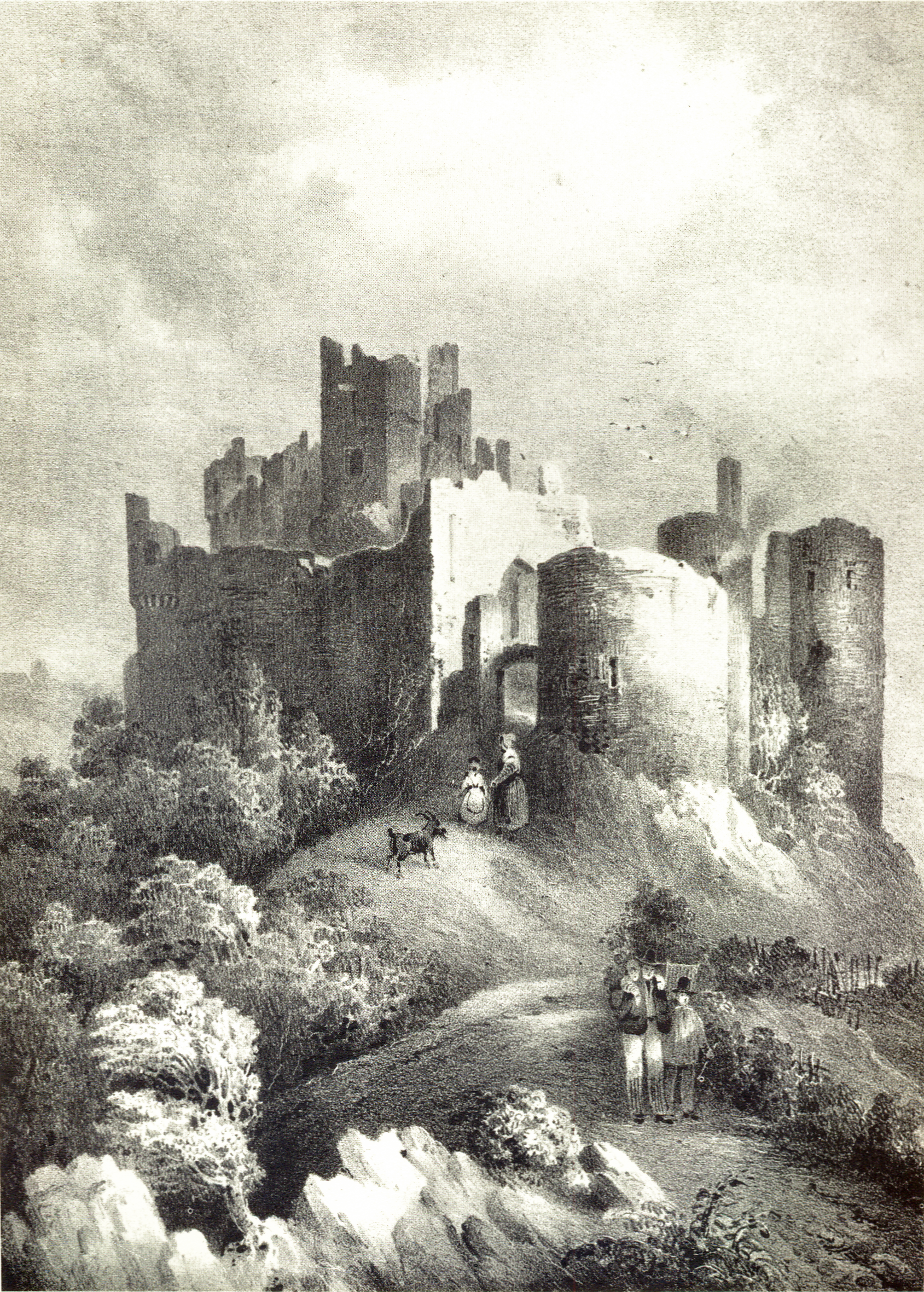
Bourscheid Castle ruins
