= Dominique Lang =

Luxembourgish painter (1874–1919)

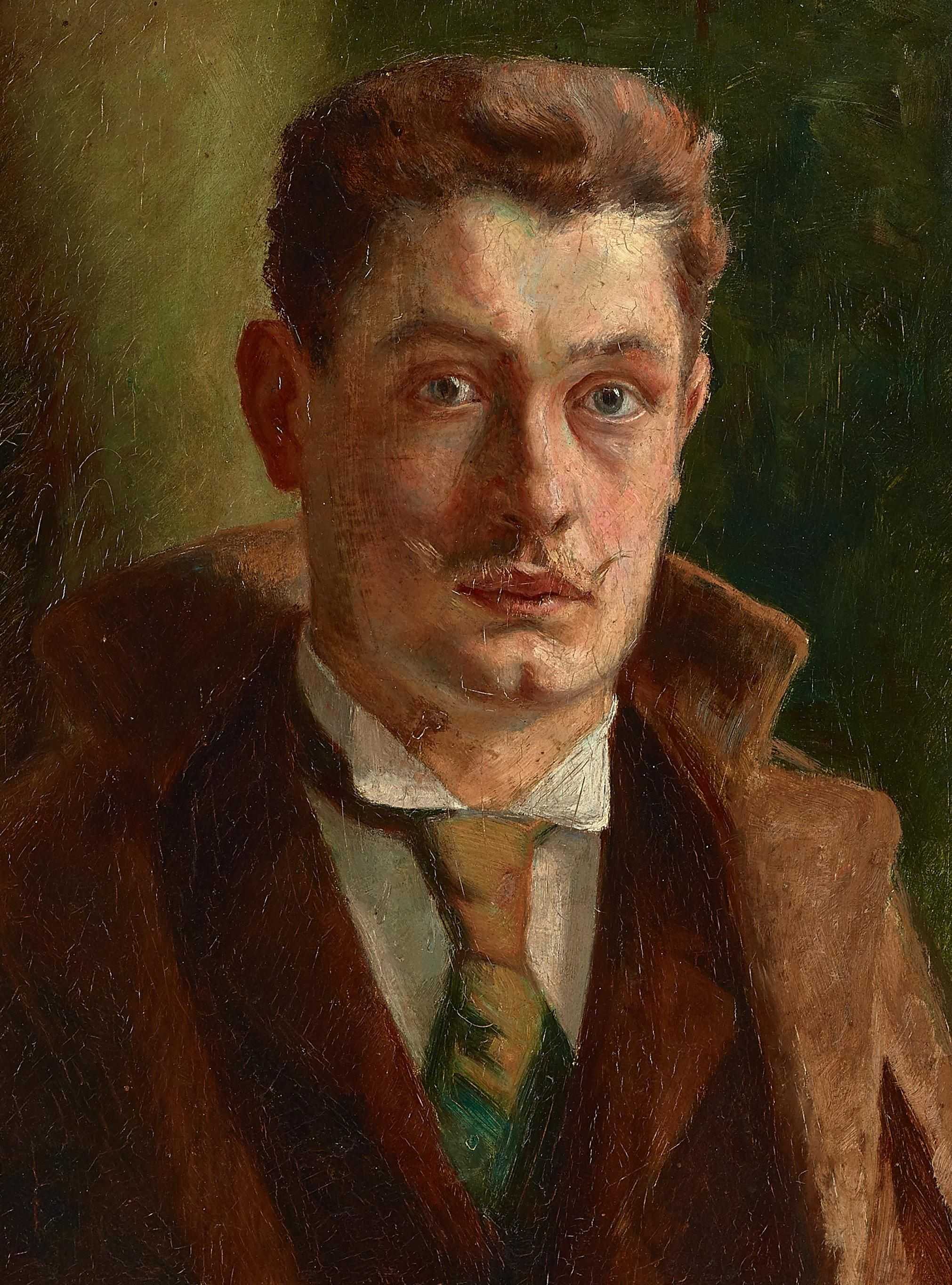
Self-portrait at the age of 25

Dominique Lang (1874–1919) is considered to be Luxembourg's most important Impressionist painter. He painted both portraits and landscapes although he was employed as a high-school teacher.

== Career ==
After completing his studies in 1901, he embarked on a Pre-Raphaelite phase when he painted the Baptism of Christ, a fresco in the church at Junglinster followed by paintings for the stations of the cross in the new church at Dudelange. Travelling on a State grant, he then spent four months studying art in Florence and Rome. Back in Dudelange, he faced not just financial problems but negative criticism of his paintings from the Cercle artistique de Luxembourg. He began to suffer from dreadful headaches, leading him into depression. His art was influenced by his reading Ruskin, Schopenhauer and Spengler, leading him into a Symbolist period where his work resembled that of the English Pre-Raphaelites who reacted against mechanisation by evoking the legends of the Middle Ages. His paintings La jeune fille et la mort and La mort entrant dans la maison are from this period. During this period, he left the family home and set up a studio in a poorer area of Dudelange.

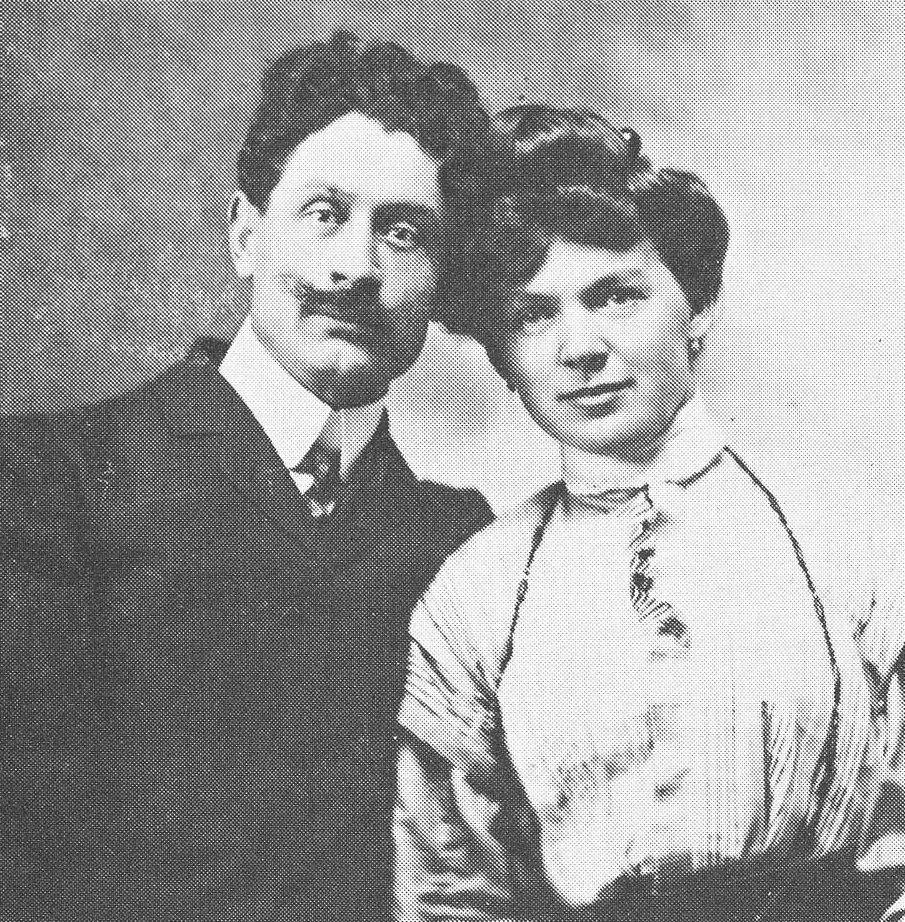
Lang with Anne-Marie Ney

After a few months in Paris (1905), Lang was admitted to the Munich Academy in March 1906 where he studied contemporary art and Impressionism (from 1907) which had a drastic effect on his painting style. When he returned to Dudelange, he opened a photographic studio which finally provided him with a reasonable income. In 1911, he married Anne-Marie Ney in 1911, who would appear in many of his paintings, and the same year he started to work as an art teacher. He first taught at the Lycée des Filles in Luxembourg City and then at the Ecole industrielle et commerciale in Esch-sur-Alzette. Unable to make a living from his paintings, for which he received little recognition during his lifetime, Lang had to remain a teacher for the rest of his working life.

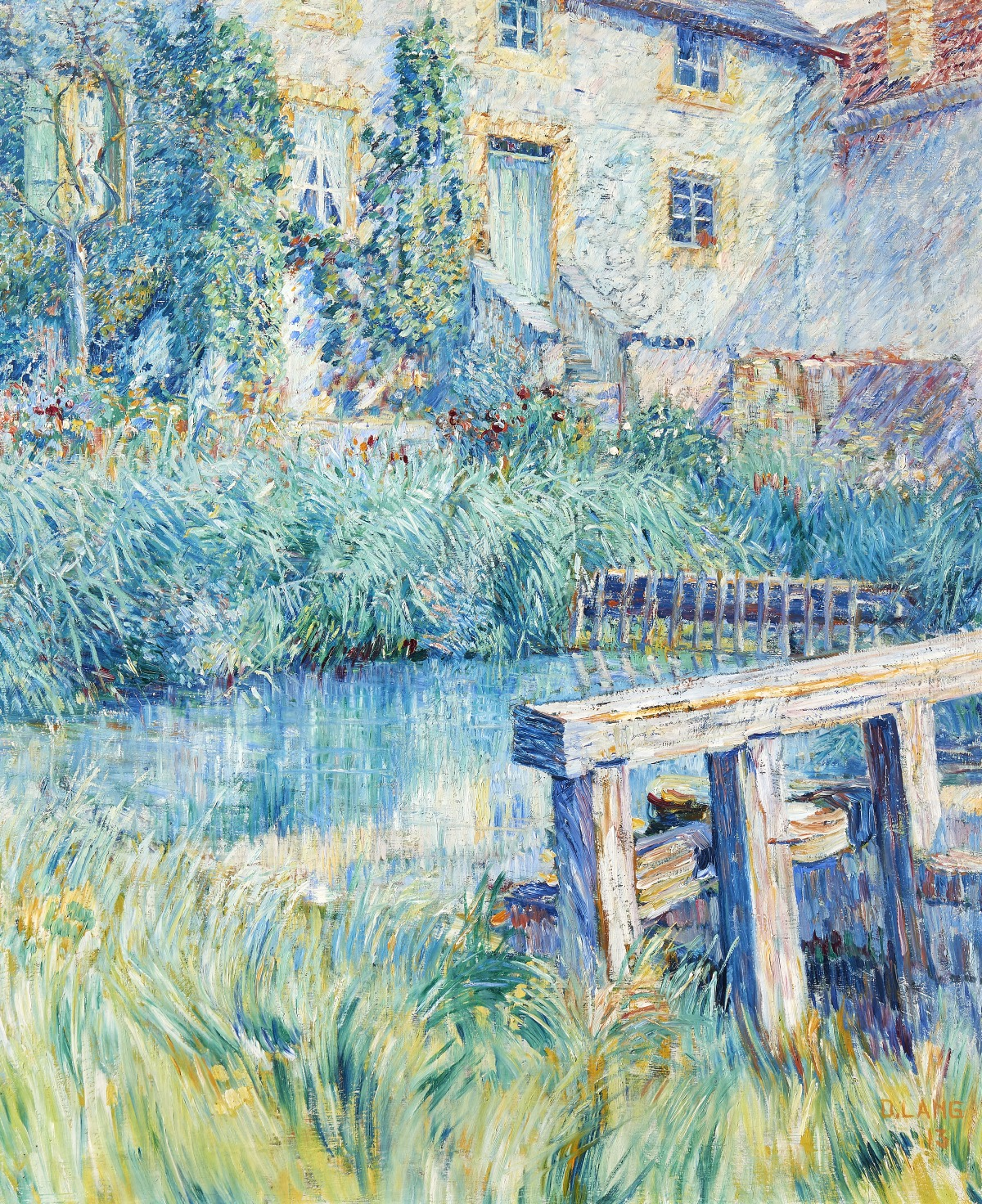
Le Barrage (1913)

His paintings were increasingly Impressionist, full of ever brighter light and often depicting a young woman clothed in white. Using short brush strokes, he would make abundant use of blues and greens. In 1912–13, he began to adopt the pure colouring favoured by Claude Monet, Pierre-Auguste Renoir and Camille Pissarro. Around this time, he began to venture out along the banks of the River Alzette painting scenes of orchards, flower picking, and fruit harvesting or of the peasant's houses in the area where he lived. His painting of Dudelange en 1917 is an illustration of his characteristic aversion to industrialization. There is no sight of factories or workmen's housing in the idyllic countryside surrounding the town.

The final period in Lang's life was once again one of increasing pessimism and distress as he suffered from severe migraines and almost total blindness. He was 45 when he died in Schifflange on 22 June 1919, and was buried in his native Dudelange.

== Affiliations and awards ==
Lang was a member of the Cercle Artistique de Luxembourg where he exhibited his paintings. In 1904 and 1919, he was awarded the Grand-Duc Adolphe Prize.

== Gallery ==
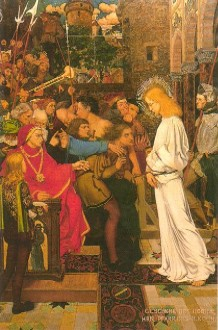
Dominique Lang: First Station of the Cross, Dudelange Church (c. 1901)

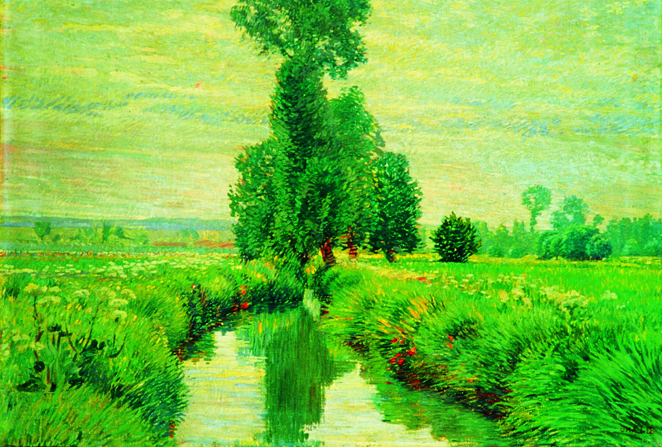
Dominique Lang: Banks of the Alzette (1915)

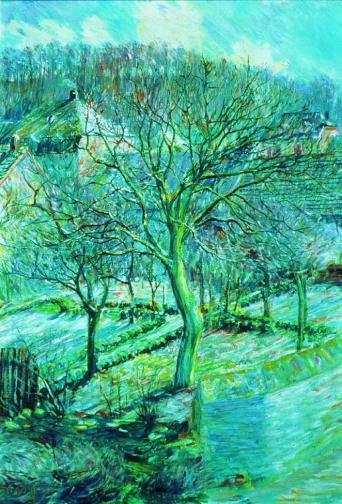
Dominique Lang: Walnut Tree in Spring Sunshine (1915)

== Bibliography ==
- Petit, Joseph; Hoffmann, Jim: Dominique Lang - Impressioniste luxembourgeois, Luxembourg: Raymon Mehlen, 1953.
- Waringo, René: "Dominique Lang 1874-1919 - Die Via Crucis in der Düdelinger Pfarrkirche", reprinted from the Luxemburger Marienkalender, Luxembourg: Imprimerie St-Paul, 1990.
- Waringo, René; Stammet, Danièle: Rétrospective Dominique Lang, Dudelange: Ville de Dudelange, 1994, (catalogue of the Dudelange exhibition from 6 May to 19 June 1994)
