= Archdiocese of Luxembourg =

Coordinates: 49.6094°N 6.1311°E

Archdiocese of Luxembourg Archidioecesis Luxemburgensis Äerzbistum Lëtzebuerg Archidiocèse de Luxembourg Erzbistum Luxemburg

Catholic
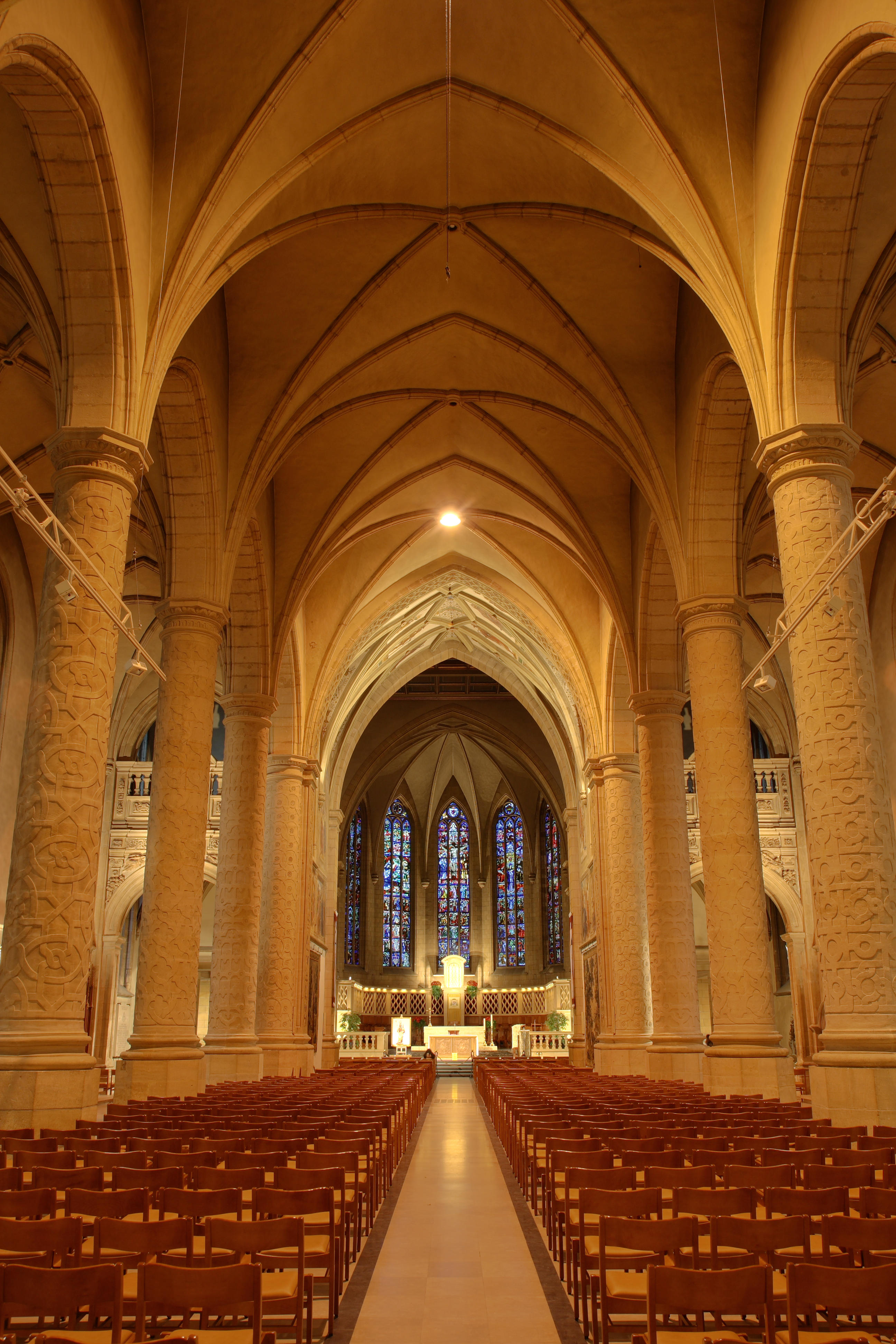
- Notre-Dame Cathedral, Luxembourg

Location
- Country: Luxembourg
- Territory: Entire country
- Metropolitan: Immediately subject to the Holy See

Statistics
- Area: 2,586 km^{2} (998 sq mi)
- Population: Total; Catholics: (as of 2019); ▲602,005; ▲439,280 (▲73%)

Information
- Rite: Latin Rite
- Established: 1833
- Cathedral: Notre-Dame Cathedral, Luxembourg

Current leadership
- Pope: Leo XIV
- Archbishop: Jean-Claude Hollerich, S.J.
- Bishops emeritus: Fernand Franck, Archbishop Emeritus (1991-2011)

The Archdiocese of Luxembourg (Latin: Archidioecesis Luxemburgensis; Luxembourgish: Äerzbistum Lëtzebuerg; French: Archidiocèse de Luxembourg; German: Erzbistum Luxemburg) is an archdiocese of the Latin Church of the Catholic Church in the Grand Duchy of Luxembourg, comprising the entire Grand Duchy. The diocese was founded in 1870, and it became an archdiocese in 1988. The seat of the archdiocese is the Cathedral of Notre Dame in the city of Luxembourg, and since 2011 the archbishop is Jean-Claude Hollerich.

== History ==
=== Early Christianity ===
Christianity spread in Luxembourg from the city of Trier, along the Roman roads. The episcopal organisation of the area started in the late 3rd century with Euchaire and Maximin of Trier, and in the early 4th century, Materne of Cologne. The Christianisation of rural areas only came much later. Rural populations remained strangers to Christianity despite scattered islands in Arlon, Bitburg, Altrier and Dalheim. In the late 5th century, the Church was cut off from the power held by the new, Frankish arrivals, who were dedicated to the cult of Odin.

After the baptism of the Frankish king Clovis I, the Frankish people were open to Christianity in theory, but paganism subsisted in remote regions, and only died out over the next two centuries.

Under the Carolingians, the Frankish church's reorganisation went underway, and the evangelisation of the area of Luxembourg was facilitated by the official recognition of Christianity. Missionaries from Aquitaine, Ireland and England helped in this.

The work of these missionaries was complemented by the foundation of monasteries in the 7th and 8th centuries: St. Maximin's Abbey in Trier (633), Stavelot-Malmedy (650), Andagium (687). Andagium became the abbey of Saint-Hubert when the remains of Saint Hubert, the bishop of Liège and patron saint of the Ardennes, were moved there in 824. Around 690, Saint Leodouin founded the abbey of Mettlach, while in 722, Bertha, sister of Charles Martel, founded Prüm Abbey, with the aid of monks from Echternach.

In the Germanic part of the region, the work of Willibrord was of prime importance. An Anglo-Saxon originally from Northumbria, Willibrord was born around 657, and took vows in the Benedictine abbey of Ripon. Around 690, he travelled with several companions to southern Frisia. He was made a bishop in 695, and established his episcopal see in Utrecht. In 698 he came to Trier. Irmine, the abbess of Oeren near Trier, granted him land in Echternach, and possessions in Badelingen, Batzen, Osweiler, and a vineyard in Vianden. Willibrord undertook new constructions in Echternach, and founded the Abbey of Echternach, dedicated to educating monks according to the Benedictine rule. It was in Echternach that he was buried in 739, and he would later come to be seen as a national saint.

The abbey of Echternach saw an extraordinary development, and continued to enjoy protection by rulers after the death of its founder. Its spiritual and artistic influence would make it one of the most important monasteries in the West. It went on to produce manuscripts, illuminated holy texts, which started to be dispersed from the 18th century. The contents of its library was estimated at 7,000 items at the times of the end of the Ancien Régime. The French Revolutionaries' pillages, and the flight of the monks towards Germany, taking with them their treasures which they later sold, caused the abbey's works of medieval religious art to be dispersed up to the present day throughout the libraries of Nuremberg, Bremen, Trier, Darmstadt, Hamburg, El Escorial and Paris.

=== 13th century: reign of Ermesinde ===
In the reign of Countess Ermesinde in the 13th century, several religious establishments were founded in Luxembourg, such as the convent of Marienthal near Mersch, a convent of Penitents on the Saint-Esprit plateau, a Cistercian monastery in Bonnevoie, the Canons Regular of St. Augustine in Houffalize, a hospital of the Trinitarians in Bastogne, and a convent in Clairefontaine-lez-Arlon.

=== 16th and 17th centuries: Spanish Netherlands ===
The Jesuits were present in Luxembourg from 1594, and due to their work, the territory was hardly affected by the Reformation. They promoted the veneration of the Virgin Mary, as "Our Lady of Luxembourg" and “Comforter of the Afflicted” (Consolix Afflictorum), in times of plague and war. She was chosen as the patroness of the city (1666) and of the duchy of Luxembourg (1678). This devotion continues to this day in the form of a national pilgrimage, the Octave, celebrated every year for two weeks in the period after Easter.

The Provincial Council (Conseil provincial) exercised functions in the ecclesiastical domain. Luxembourg had the peculiarity that the bishops, the ecclesiastical authorities, resided outside of the territory. Their acts could not obtain the force of law without the approval of the Council, in the form of the "placet". The Council often made use of this to retain control of the Catholic Reformation, and to force foreign bishops to recognise its authority. At first it was necessary for papal and episcopal acts, but eventually was required for any juridical act by a clergyman. In certain areas, the Council exercised a right of censorship over the church, such as in the areas of visits by the bishops or their representatives, papal and episcopal bulls and pastoral letters, observations of religious holidays, and appointments to parishes. During the conflicts with Trier, the Council's resistance prevented the archbishop of Trier from levying taxes from the Luxembourgish clergy.

From the 14th century, the ruler of Luxembourg had had to consult the nobility, the clergy and the bourgeoisie, especially when asking for money: this eventually evolved into the Provincial Estates of Luxembourg. As to the clergy, contemporary sources mention specifically the sires prélats, as it was only the large abbeys that were represented, as large-scale landowners. These were the abbey of St. Maximin of Trier, which was outside of Luxembourg but owned a lot of land in the territory, as well as the abbeys of Echternach, Munster, Orval, and Saint-Hubert, and the priory of Houffalize. The secular clergy and the smaller monasteries were not represented.

Luxembourg was at this time divided between six dioceses, two of which took up the lion's share of the duchy: the archdiocese of Trier and the diocese of Liège; the others were the dioceses of Metz, Verdun, Reims and Cologne.

The secular clergy at this time lived a generally unvirtuous life, lived in poverty and were under-educated. As to the regular clergy, there was a profound decadence which affected the old and established monasteries such as that of Echternach (Benedictines), Saint-Hubert (Benedictines), Orval (Cistercians), Altmünster (Benedictines) as well as more recent establishments. As in the rest of the Habsburg Netherlands, the situation of the Catholic Church in Luxembourg was precarious: the number of clerics who drank or had relationships was high, and the parishioners were often left to themselves, without regular religious instruction, and turned to superstition. The number of witchcraft trials in the 16th and 17th centuries was correspondingly high.

=== 18th century: Austrian Habsburgs ===
In the 18th century, the clergy in Luxembourg could take no substantive decision without the consent of the state. The practice of the placet allowed the government to exercise a measure of control on ecclesiastical acts. No order or pastoral letter, whether from the pope or the bishop, could be published in the duchy without the consent of the Conseil de Luxembourg. Nominations to a parish or benefice could not go ahead without the assent of the civil authorities.

The secular clergy's situation, particularly in rural areas, was not particularly healthy. The more favoured among them were educated in the theology faculties of Louvain, Trier or Cologne; the others received their education from a parish priest, who would have taught them some elements of Latin, philosophy and theology. The priests' social rank would vary greatly according to their financial situation.

The clergy's resources derived from tithes, revenues from fees for baptisms, marriages and burials, and revenues from the bouvrot, land which rural clergymen exploited as farmers of crops or livestock.

Many of them exercised the function of "curé-notaire", drafting contracts of marriage and testaments for their parishioners. This function, defined in 1586 by Philip II, was particularly present in the duchy of Luxembourg, which was handicapped by large distances and the poor urban network. Those clergymen without a parish were forced to content themselves with the revenues from working as parochial vicars, sacristans or as schoolteachers. These clergymen, poorly educated and living modestly, were a reflection of the rural, poor and superstitious Luxembourgish society, from which many of them originated.

The regular clergy enjoyed a higher level of prestige than the secular clergy. It was concentrated in the abbeys of Echternach, Munster, Saint-Hubert and Orval. The abbeys were large property owners in the 18th century, and built their own foundries; the abbots, alongside their spiritual role, also played a political and industrial role. Nicolas Spirlet (1715-1794), the last abbot of Saint-Hubert, specialised in producing cannons which were exported to Revolutionary America.

After the reforms of Joseph II, the contemplative orders were suppressed, while the large monasteries disappeared in the French Revolution. Orval was the only one that would later be re-founded, in 1927.

Before the French Revolution, the southern part of the territory of what is now the archdiocese belonged to the Diocese of Trier (then an archbishopric) and the northern part to the Diocese of Liège.

=== 19th century ===
During the French occupation (1794-1814) of Luxembourg, its entire territory (then the Département des Forêts), became, after the Concordat of 1801, part of the Diocese of Metz.

After the 1815 Congress of Vienna, which raised Luxembourg to the rank of Grand Duchy in personal union with the crown of the Netherlands, Pope Pius VII attached in 1823 the territory to the Diocese of Namur (because the Diocese of Namur was then, between 1815 and 1830, part of the United Kingdom of the Netherlands).

From 25 December 1833 Johann Theodor van der Noot, became apostolic prefect of the part of Luxembourg under Dutch control, and he became the first apostolic vicar when, on 2 June 1840, the territory of the Grand Duchy became an apostolic vicariate. Van der Noot remained a priest, although such a jurisdiction would normally be headed by a titular bishop. The apostolic vicariate became a fully fledged diocese on 27 December 1870, without being incorporated into any ecclesiastical province.

After the dissolutions of the French Revolution, new monastic orders and congregations were founded in the 19th and beginning of the 20th century. Some of these still undertake social and educational work to this day, as well as being active in the pastoral and contemplative sphere: sisters of the Order of Saint Elisabeth, sisters of Saint Francis of the Divine Mercy, sisters of the Christian doctrine, sisters of the Poor Child Jesus, Lay Carmelites, Benedictine of the Perpetual Adoration of the Most Blessed Sacrament; Redemptorists, Charitable Friars, Priests of the Sacred-Heart, Benedictine in Clervaux, etc.

=== Clervaux Abbey ===
On 4 August 1937, the Archdiocese of Luxembourg ceded a portion of territory for the benefit of the erection as territorial abbey of Clervaux Abbey, whose independent status was suppressed in 1946 and its territory reintegrated into that of the Luxembourg diocese.

=== World War II to present ===
During World War II, when Luxembourg was occupied by Nazi Germany, the Catholic Church was relatively silent. It took no public stance regarding the fate of the Jews or the Nazi regime. On the one hand, the bishop, Joseph Laurent Philippe, was bedridden due to illness, and was therefore in no state to provide active opposition. On the other hand, the Bishop did not want to further antagonise the occupiers and endanger the already fragile religious life of the Church, which was heavily restricted during wartime. Bishop Philippe did, however, refuse to meet with the Nazi leadership, and made preparations in case his post should fall vacant.

The Church saw its very existence threatened as it was pushed out of public life by the anti-religious policies of the Nazis: public religious events such as the Octave celebration or the dancing procession were banned, Christian organisations were dissolved, religious education in schools was abolished, and a ban on the religious orders was put in place.

At the same time, the diocese administration remained one of very few Luxembourgish institutions that stayed intact during the war, although this was in doubt for a while, and the occupation authorities did consider deporting the Bishop.

The Catholic Church in Luxembourg attempted to adapt itself to modern requirements through the 4th Luxembourg Diocesan Synod (1972-1981), following on from the Second Vatican Council (1962-1965). The Church wanted to establish a level of dialogue with and opening up towards modern culture and the world.

On 23 April 1988, it was raised to the rank of archdiocese, immediately subject to the Holy See.

The establishment of the Council of Christian Churches in 1997 indicated a certain emphasis on ecumenism between Christian churches.

The current Archbishop of Luxembourg, since 12 July 2011, is Jean-Claude Hollerich.

== Situation ==
The archdiocese is not a metropolitan see, having no suffragans.

At the end of 2010, the archdiocese estimated its membership at 396,500, out of a total population of 502,000, and reported that it had 275 parishes, 151 diocesan priests, 56 religious priests, 6 permanent deacons, 70 religious brothers and 566 religious sisters. However, the numbers of Catholics actually attending Mass is on the decline, as reflected by amalgamations of parishes and deconsecrations of churches. In 2020, membership was given as 457,000 people; it was also noted that the number of nuns had halved.

The state and Catholic Church in Luxembourg have a relationship where they recognise each other's autonomy, while still engaging in different forms of cooperation. This cooperation is governed by the Luxembourg Constitution, and various laws and conventions. There is a certain degree of collaboration in the social-charitable and educational sectors between both actors: the Church provides religious education in public schools, private schools are part-financed by the state. The state also pays the salaries of the ministers of the main Christian churches as well as the Jewish community.

Currently under discussion is the disestablishment of the Church in Luxembourg, whereby the State would cease to hold financial responsibility for the Church.

A 1996 survey (not a census) reported Catholics 88%, including the royal family; Protestants and similar 1%; other religions 1%; no religion 9%; no reply 1%.

Since 1994 the Polish community regularly has masses in the churches of Esch-sur-Alzette and Ingeldorf.

== Ordinaries ==
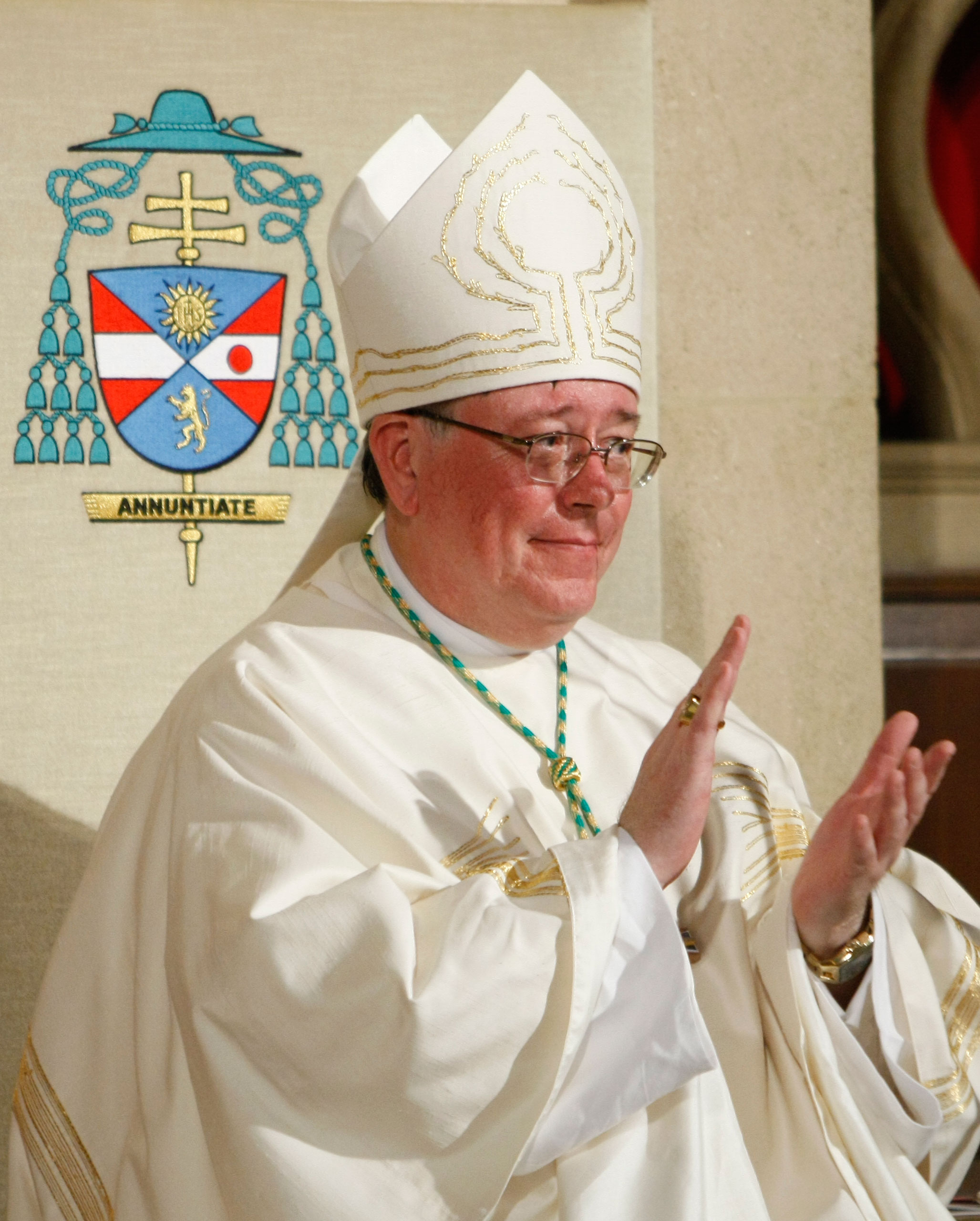
Jean-Claude Hollerich, current Archbishop of Luxembourg.

=== Apostolic Vicars ===
- Johann Theodor van der Noot (1833–1841)
- Johann Theodor Laurent (1841–1856)
- Nikolaus Adames (1848–1870)

=== Bishops ===
- Nikolaus Adames (1870–1883)
- Johannes Joseph Koppes (1883–1918)
- Petrus Nommesch (1920–1935)
- Joseph Laurent Philippe, S.C.I. (1935–1956)
- Léon Lommel (1956–1971)
- Jean Hengen (1971–1988) Archbishop (personal title ) 1985

=== Archbishops ===
- Jean Hengen (1988–1990)
- Fernand Franck (1990–2011)
- Jean-Claude Hollerich, S.J. (2011– )

== See also ==
- Oktav
- The Ninth Day
- Religion in Luxembourg
- Protestantism in Luxembourg
- Orthodox Archdiocese of Belgium and exarchate of the Netherlands and Luxembourg
