= Jean Hengen =

Luxembourgish prelate

His Excellency Jean Hengen
- Archbishop Emeritus of Luxembourg
- Church: Roman Catholic
- Diocese: Roman Catholic Archdiocese of Luxembourg
- Installed: 12 February 1971
- Term ended: 2 February 1991
- Predecessor: Léon Lommel
- Successor: Fernand Franck

Orders
- Ordination: 27 October 1940
- Consecration: 4 June 1967
- Rank: Bishop

Personal details
- Born: Jean Hengen; 23 November 1912 Dudelange, Luxembourg
- Died: 29 January 2005 (aged 92) Luxembourg (city)
- Buried: Notre-Dame Cathedral, Luxembourg
- Denomination: Roman Catholic
- Motto: Tibi servire (To Serve you)
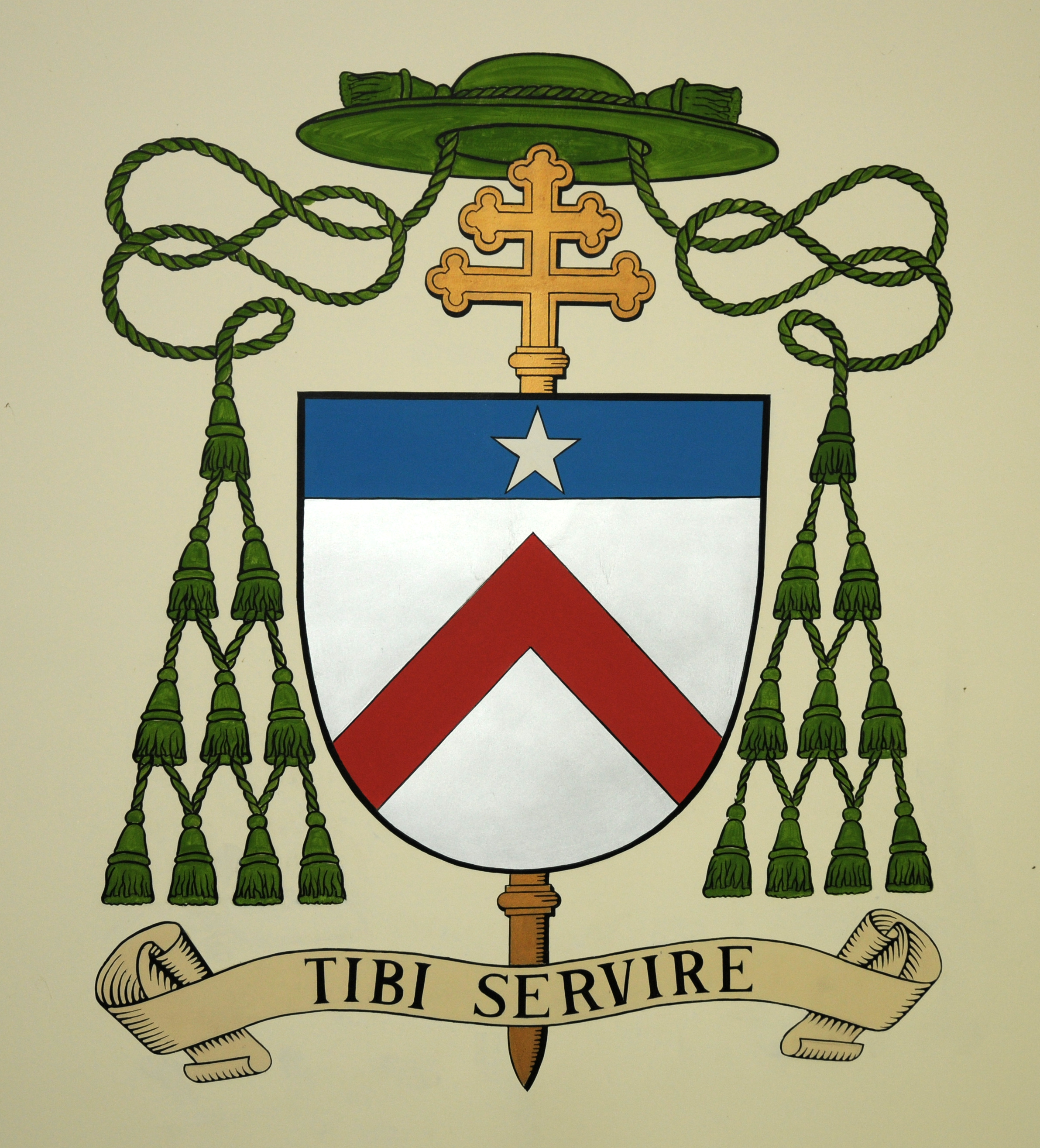
- Coat of arms

Jean Hengen (23 November 1912 – 29 January 2005) was a Luxembourgish prelate of the Roman Catholic Church. He served as Bishop of Luxembourg from 13 February 1971 until 21 December 1990, whereupon Luxembourg was created as an Archbishopric, and thereafter he served as Archbishop of Luxembourg. Hengen was inducted into the Order of the Oak Crown as a Grand Officer on 23 June 1981.

== Life ==
=== Youth ===
Hengen was born on 23 November 1912 in Dudelange, the seventh of eight children of Michel Hengen and Anna Gindt. After completing his secondary schooling at the Athénée de Luxembourg, he started studying philosophy and theology at the Pontifical Gregorian University in Rome. He later also studied canon law.

=== Priesthood ===
He was ordained a priest on 27 October 1940 in Rome in the Church of the Gesù. He celebrated his first Mass in Luxembourg in the Franciscan church. It was not until after the war, in 1945, that he celebrated the first Mass in Dudelange in his home parish. After his doctorate in theology, he was made canon of the Cathedral by Bishop Joseph Philippe on 20 August 1945. On 1 August 1949 he became chancellor of the diocese, and on 6 June 1955 was appointed Vicar-General. From 1955 to 1971 he was made president of the board of directors of the printing house Imprimerie Saint Paul.

=== Bishop ===
Pope Paul VI appointed Hengen the titular bishop of Calama and coadjutor bishop on 8 April 1967, with right of succession. On 4 June 1967 he was consecrated in Notre-Dame Cathedral. On 12 February 1971, after Léon Lommel retirement, Hengen became the sixth Bishop of Luxembourg. His motto as Bishop was "Tibi servire" (To serve you).

On 13 May 1972 he convened the 4th Luxembourgish diocesan synod, which was to be a synod of renewal.

When the old bell-tower of the Cathedral was in flames on Good Friday in 1985, he personally saved the statue of the Virgin Mary – an important Luxembourgish symbol – and later took care of planning the reconstruction. The same year, Pope John Paul II personally appointed him the first Archbishop of Luxembourg on 16 May during a visit to the country. In 1988 Luxembourg was elevated to an Archdiocese.

Jean Hengen was also the president of the German commission responsible for publishing liturgical books.

One big project of Bishop Hengen was a church at the service of young people. Under him, the Pélé des Jeunes started in 1974, which to this day takes place on the first Sunday of the Octave celebrations. Other high points of youth ministry were the meeting of young people with John Paul II in Echternach during the papal visit of 1985, and Youth Day (Jugenddag), a national version of the World Youth Days.

=== Retirement ===
With the consecration of Fernand Franck as his successor on 2 February 1991, Jean Hengen's tenure as Archbishop came to an end. In this time in office, he had always tried to avoid favouring his home town of Dudelange over other Luxembourgish cities. Thus, while he declined Abbot Robert Sibenaler's invitation to the Octave Mass of the Dudelange pilgrims during his time as Bishop, after his retirement he willingly participated in this tradition. After his death, flowers were laid in the crypt for the people of Dudelange every year after the Octave Mass.

On 29 October 2000 he celebrated his diamond jubilee as a clergyman. Dudelange also honoured "its" Bishop on 23 November 2002 for his 90th birthday, which was also the last Mass that he would celebrate as Bishop. His last public appearance was on 10 May 2004 at the Octave Mass with the Dudelange pilgrims. On this occasion, he did not wear a Bishop's ornaments such as a staff and mitre, but a simple violet Bishop's cassock and a rochet.

Jean Hengen died in the hospital on Kirchberg at 12:00 on 29 January 2005. His remains were buried on 2 February 2005 in the crypt of Notre-Dame Cathedral in Luxembourg.

Religious titles
Preceded by Léon Lommel	Bishop of Luxembourg; 13 February 1971 – 1985	Personally promoted to Archbishop in 1985 Archdiocese in 1988
New title Personally promoted to Archbishop in 1985	Archbishop of Luxembourg; 1985 – 21 December 1990	Succeeded by Fernand Franck
