= Our Lady of Luxembourg =

Name of Virgin Mary venerated in Luxembourg

Our Lady of Luxembourg Consolatress of the Afflicted
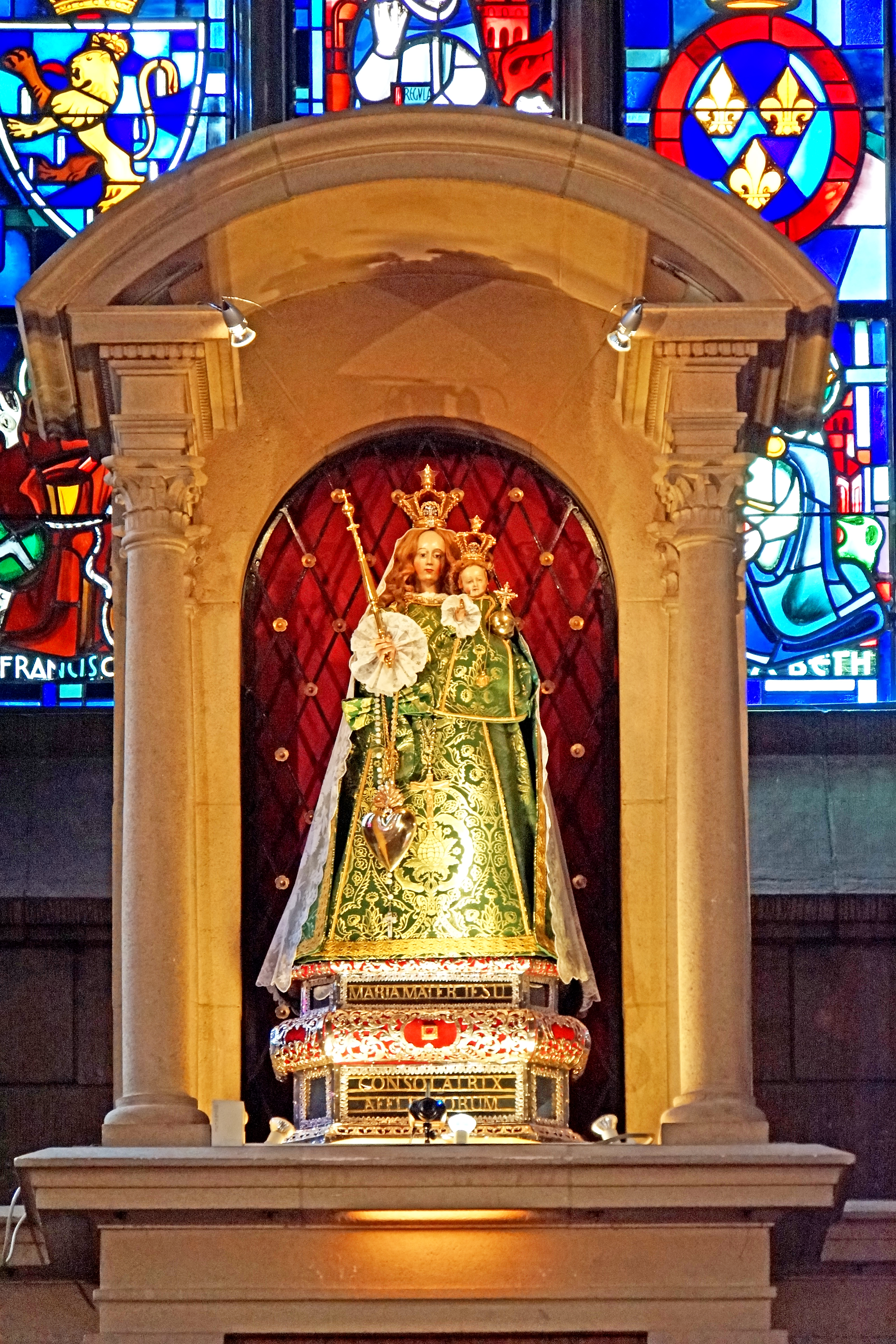
- Statue of the Consolatrix Afflictorum in the High Altar of Notre-Dame Cathedral, Luxembourg
- Approval: Pope Pius IX; Pope Francis
- Venerated in: Roman Catholic Archdiocese of Luxembourg
- Patronage: Grand Duchy of Luxembourg
- Attributes: Blessed Virgin Mary, crowned and draped with a gilded cope, while carrying the Child Jesus holding a scepter
- Feast day: 15 September; Friday of Sorrows

Our Lady of Luxembourg (Luxembourgish: Notre Dame du Lëtzebuerg) is a Roman Catholic devotional image of the Blessed Virgin Mary under the Marian title of Our Lady of Consolation.

This statue of the Madonna and Child is vested in imperial regalia and is widely venerated as a national and patriotic symbol enshrined at the Notre-Dame Cathedral, Luxembourg.

== History ==
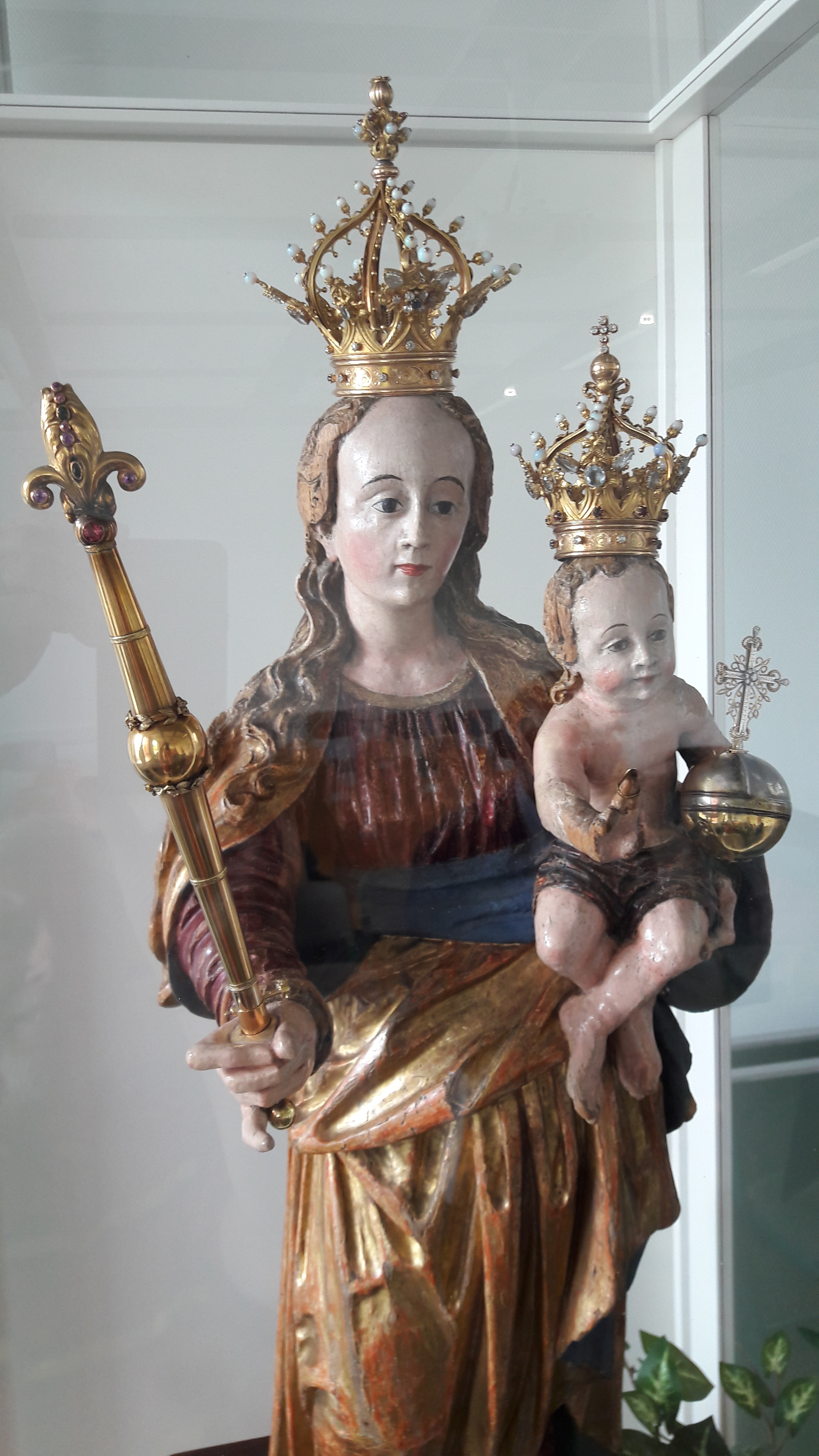
The venerated image of the Madonna and Child as carved from the year 1624.

=== Jesuit Devotion ===
The devotion to Our Lady Consolatrix Afflictorum was initiated in Luxembourg by the Jesuit Order on 8 December 1624 and led to the election of Our Lady as the protectress of the City on 27 September 1666 and of the Duchy on 20 February 1678. After the destruction of the old pilgrimage chapel of Glacis at the time of the French Revolution, the statue of Our Lady of Luxembourg was moved to the former Saint Peter church (namesake but different location), today renamed as Notre-Dame Cathedral in Luxembourg City.

Accordingly, the Luxembourgish peoples deeply honor the Blessed Virgin Mary under this particular title and imagery due to the longstanding belief that their national independence and sovereignty was tied to the religious devotion fostered by this image along with the assent of the Luxembourg royal families from the yoke of Germany.

=== The Virgin of Kevelær ===
From there the devotion was adopted by the English Benedictine nuns of Cambrai, France as well as in Kevelaer in Germany since 1 June 1642. Following an apparition in that place, an image of Our Lady of Luxembourg was placed there. The devotion spreads not only to the historical provinces of Luxembourg in Lorraine or Belgium but also beyond the oceans as in the United States and even India, helped by the work of Jesuit missionaries.

=== National symbol ===
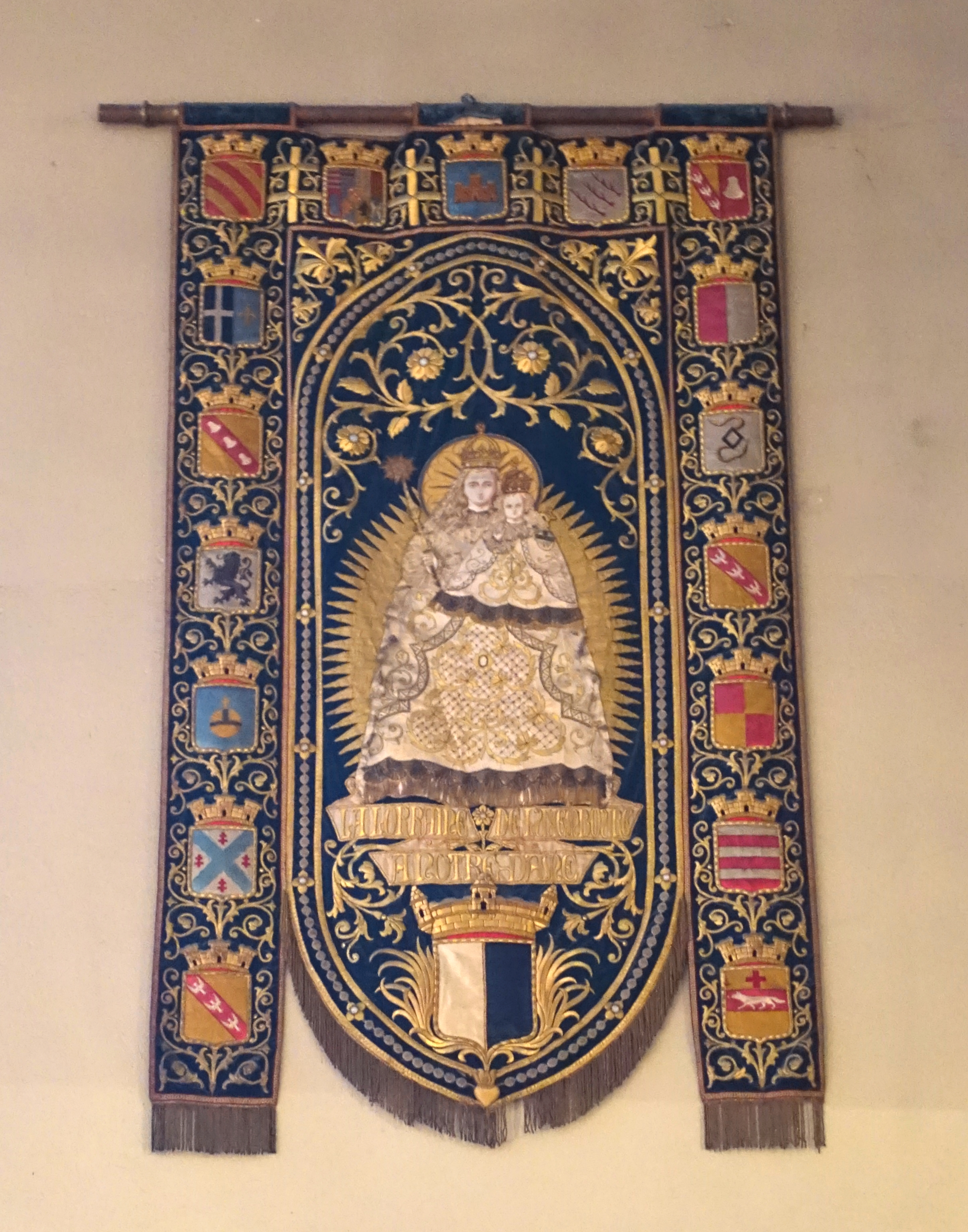
National standard banner of ornate embroidery bearing the image (surrounded by the Royal families of Luxembourg) for its annual patriotic festivities.

From the 19th century, as Luxembourg emerged as nation-state, the Consolatrix Afflictorum was more often referred to as Our Lady of Luxembourg, signing a strong association between the Luxembourgish identity and the devotion to the Blessed Virgin.

By Royal decree, the official title accorded by the Royal family of Luxembourg to the image is as follows:

Latin: Maria Mutter Jesu, Consolatricis Afflictorum, Matris Consolationis, Patrona Civitatis et Patriæ Luxemburgensis.
English: Mary, Mother of God, consoler of the afflicted, Patroness of the City and the Luxembourg Nation.

Accordingly, the Grand Duchess of Luxembourg possesses the Privilege du blanc, exercised by designated Catholic Royalty to wear white garments before the Roman Pontiff during a private audience at the Apostolic Palace.

== Pontifical approbations ==
- Pope Pius IX granted the Pontifical decree of coronation on 24 June 1866. The rite of coronation was executed on 2 July 1866 via the Papal legate, Cardinal Karl-August von Reisach.
- Pope Francis gifted a Golden Rose to the Marian statue on 26 September 2024, in conclusion of the meeting in the Notre-Dame Cathedral with the catholic community and national authorities.

== Cult of the Blessed Virgin Mary ==
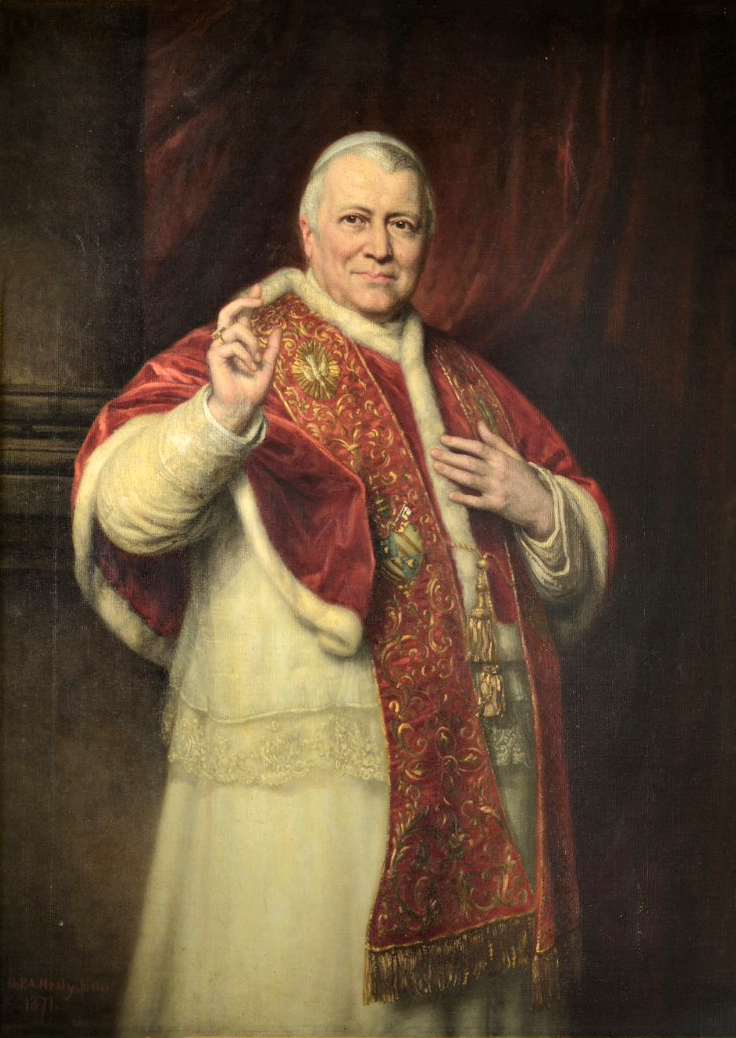
Pope Pius IX on an official Roman portrait (1871) by the American painter George Peter Alexander Healy.

The statue that is kept in Luxembourg Cathedral has been attested since the beginning of the 17th—century. It is an effigy of a woman carrying her child, carved in lime wood, with a height of 73 centimeters. The statue was restored in 2008 by artisan Muriel Prieur. This professional restoration made it possible to establish that its date of manufacture dates back to the end of the 16th century . In addition, the style and the chiseling technique would indicate that the sculptor would have come from the greater Germanic region, and not from Flanders, Belgium or Champagne, France as was long assumed by pious legend.

It is a standing woman, her hair loose, her feet placed on the Moon, wearing a crown of stars, appearing in the story of the Holy Bible: "A woman clothed with the sun, with the Moon under her feet." (Book of the Apocalypse, 12, 1). According to the traditional Catholic interpretation, this woman is the Virgin Mary, the Sun represents the New Covenant, the Moon the Old Covenant or Heresy. She carries a royal scepter in her right hand and in her left hand the seated Child Jesus, wearing a royal crown and carrying an orb Globus Cruciger, a terrestrial globe surmounted by a cross. These symbols evoke the royalty of Mary as Queen Mother in Heaven and of Jesus on Earth, as Christ the King.

The sculpture depicts her wearing a tunic, a belt and a cloak. Following a medieval custom that was long preserved in Spain, the statue was dressed in richly embroidered and ornamented clothes, in particular a vast cloak in the form of a cape or cope that descended to the ground and concealed her feet placed on the Moon. These ornaments were renewed several times, adapting to the style of the time, as evidenced by the various representations of the statue published over the centuries. The crown of the Virgin lost its stars, and attributes were added.

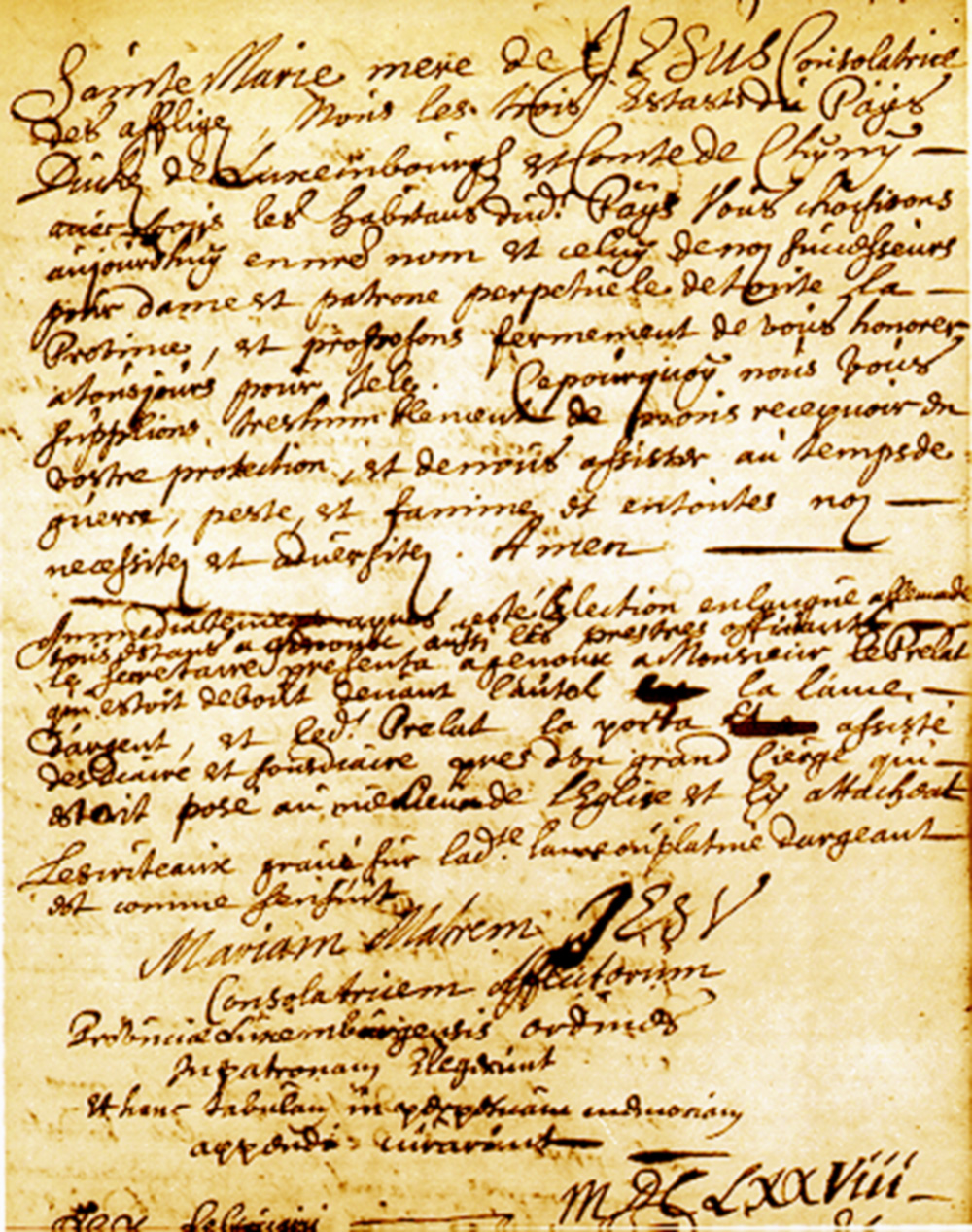
The Royal Act of 20 February 1678 by which the Virgin Mary, Consoler of the afflicted, was elected perpetual patroness of the Duchy of Luxembourg.

The statue is first mentioned in an inventory document dated on 8 December 1624, the day when it was carried in procession outside the fortifications by the college students led by Father Jacques Brocquart, a Jesuit priest under the invocation of "Our Lady of Victory". To shelter it, a chapel was built from 1625 to 1628, the Chapelle du Glacis, it was then designated as "Our Lady of Glacis".

In 1639, the first Book of Miracles mentions answered prayers and healings that took place, and to cope with the influx of pilgrims, the statue was brought for a period of eight days from the Glacis to the chapel of the Jesuit college inside the city. At the end of this eight days, during a solemn closing procession, the statue was brought back to the chapel of Glacis. This procession will be organized every year until today.

Her veneration continued to spread among the population. An additional base was made for her with the words Consolatrix afflictorium ora pro nobis, and she then became "Our Lady, Consoler of the Afflicted". Around 1640, a similar Marian cult existed in Kevelaer, in the Bas-Rhin, Germany.

After the election of Our Lady the Consoler as patron saint of the city in 1666 and as patron-protector of the Duchy of Luxembourg in 1678, the statue was kept in the chapel of the Jesuit College. Since 1766 it has been placed during the Octave on a special votive altar in the rocaille style, made of wrought iron and richly decorated.

Since 1794, the statue has been permanently located in the former church of the Jesuit college, which became the town's parish church in 1778 and was then erected as a cathedral church in 1870.

Today, the image is venerated from the fourth to the sixth Sunday of Easter . The pilgrimage to the Comforter of the Afflicted, patron saint of the city since 1666 and of the country of Luxembourg since 1678, can be considered a national pilgrimage . Thus each year the solemn vows of 1678 are renewed in the presence of the Grand Duke, the government and the municipal authorities. Distinguished guests are often invited to this celebration. On May 15, 1898, for example, Bishop Peter Joseph Hurth, missionary bishop in East Bengal (now Bangladesh), celebrated the closing Mass in the presence of Grand Duchess Marie Adelaïde of Luxembourg.

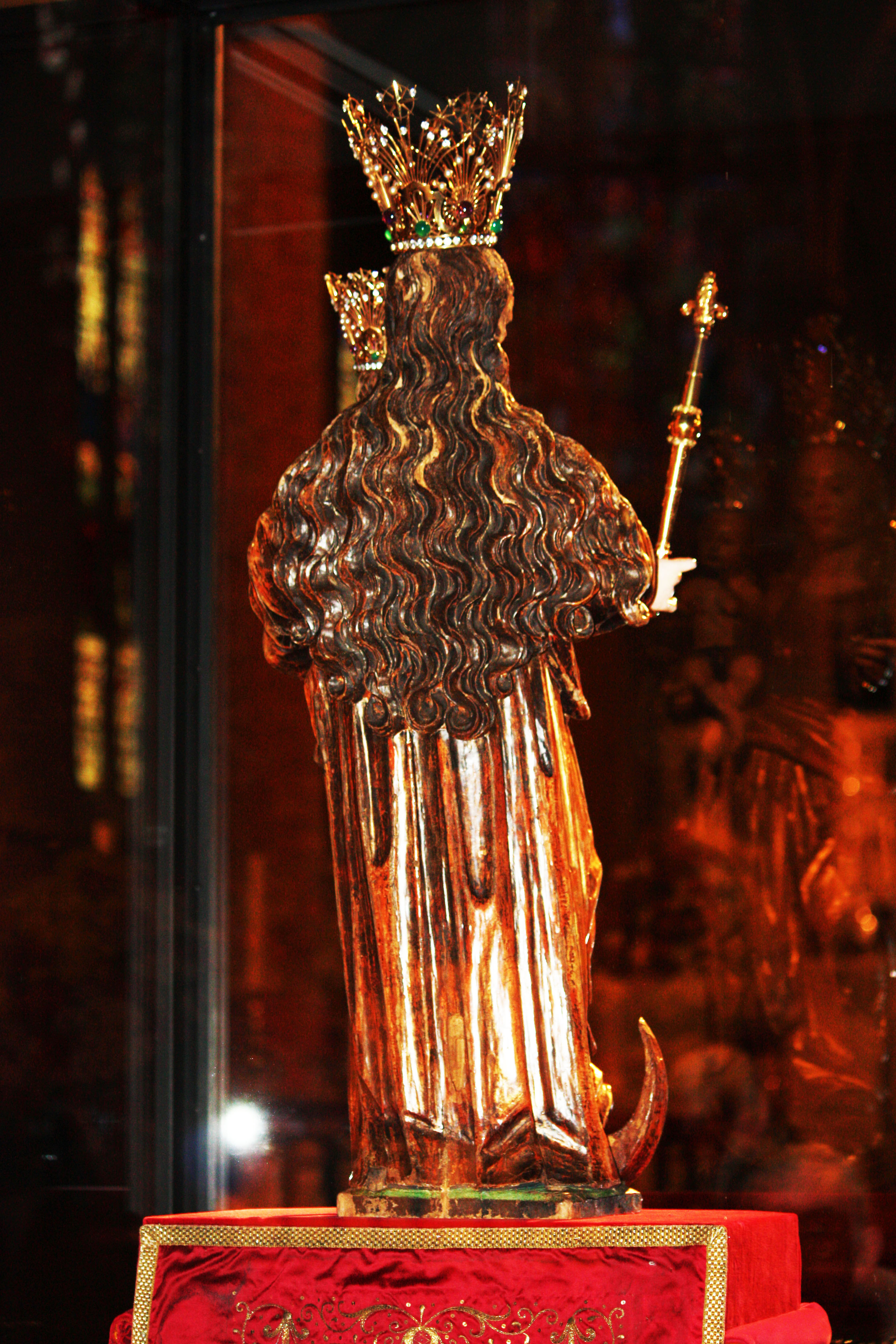
Backside detail of the wooden venerated image.

The statue of Our Lady of Luxembourg is currently enshrined in the Cathedral of Our Lady in Luxembourg city. Statues depicting Our Lady Consolatrix Afflictorum can be found in niches in buildings throughout the city of Luxembourg.

Luxembourgish painter Michel Engels depicted a romantic version of the Consolatrix Afflictorum as the Allegorie de la Patria above the city of Luxembourg, showing that "it is under her watchful and protective eye that the nation achieved its political liberation".

=== Takenplatte ===
As a form of devotion to our Lady of Luxembourg, Takenplatte or firebacks were moulded with her image. They usually depict the Virgin Mary with the Child Jesus, holding a scepter, keys and high crown. Her veil falls down to the ground as a bridal symbol. Above Mary, putti hold a crown of clasps over her crowned head.

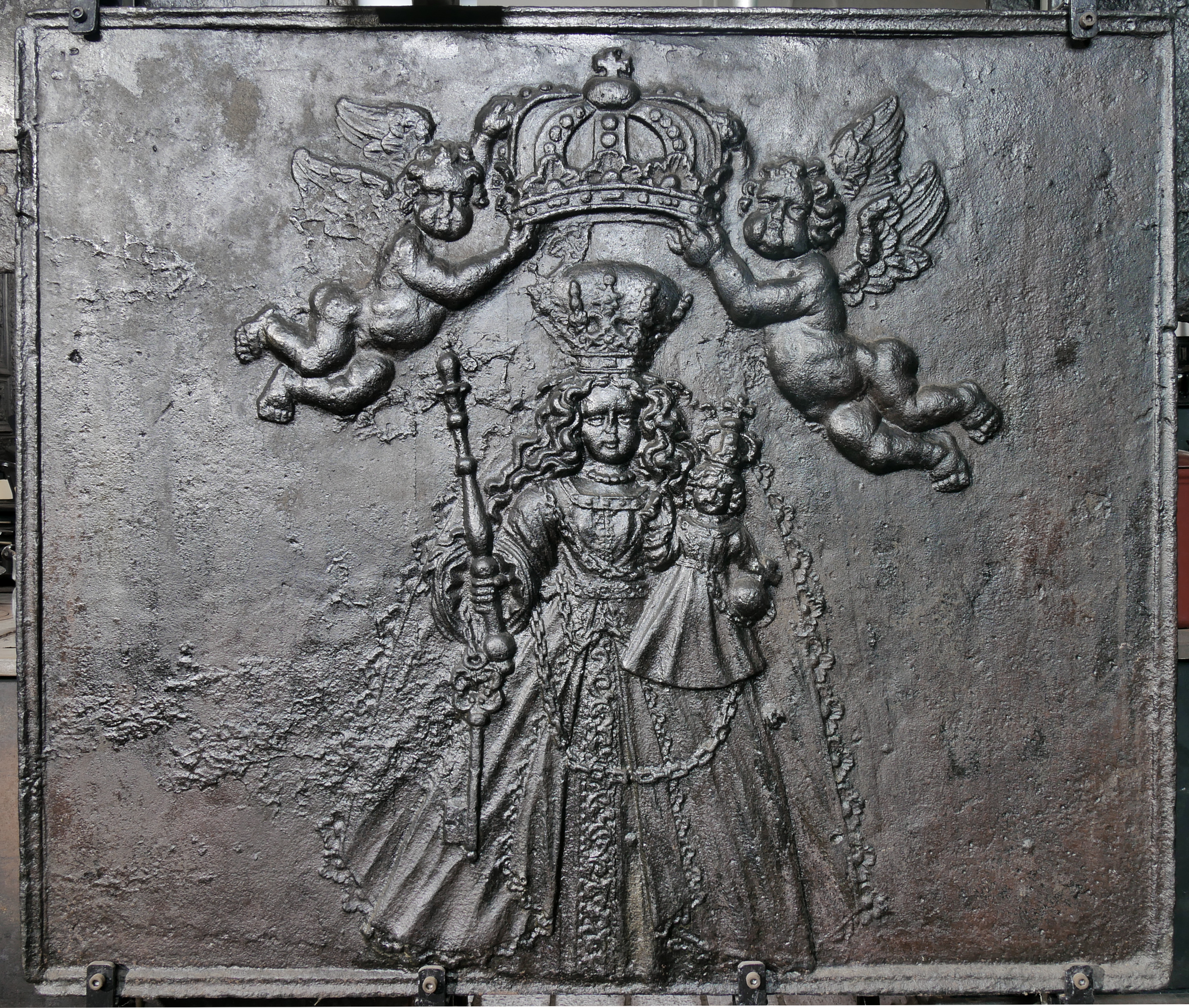
Fireback plate representing Our Lady of Luxembourg.

It was a very popular plate motif of which several casts have survived. The model has been in use for over 300 years, as dateable casts from 1708 to 1803 have been preserved. Our record is more spartan in nature.

Comparable plates with the identical main motif often have dates, banners and ornamental decorative elements. At first glance, the picture on the Takenplatte bears very little resemblance to the Madonna standing in the Luxembourg Cathedral. This can be explained by the fact that this Madonna was always wrapped in precious clothes for centuries and is also shown on the Takenplatte, among other things. It was only during the last renovation in 2008 that the Madonna's robes were removed.

== Hymns ==
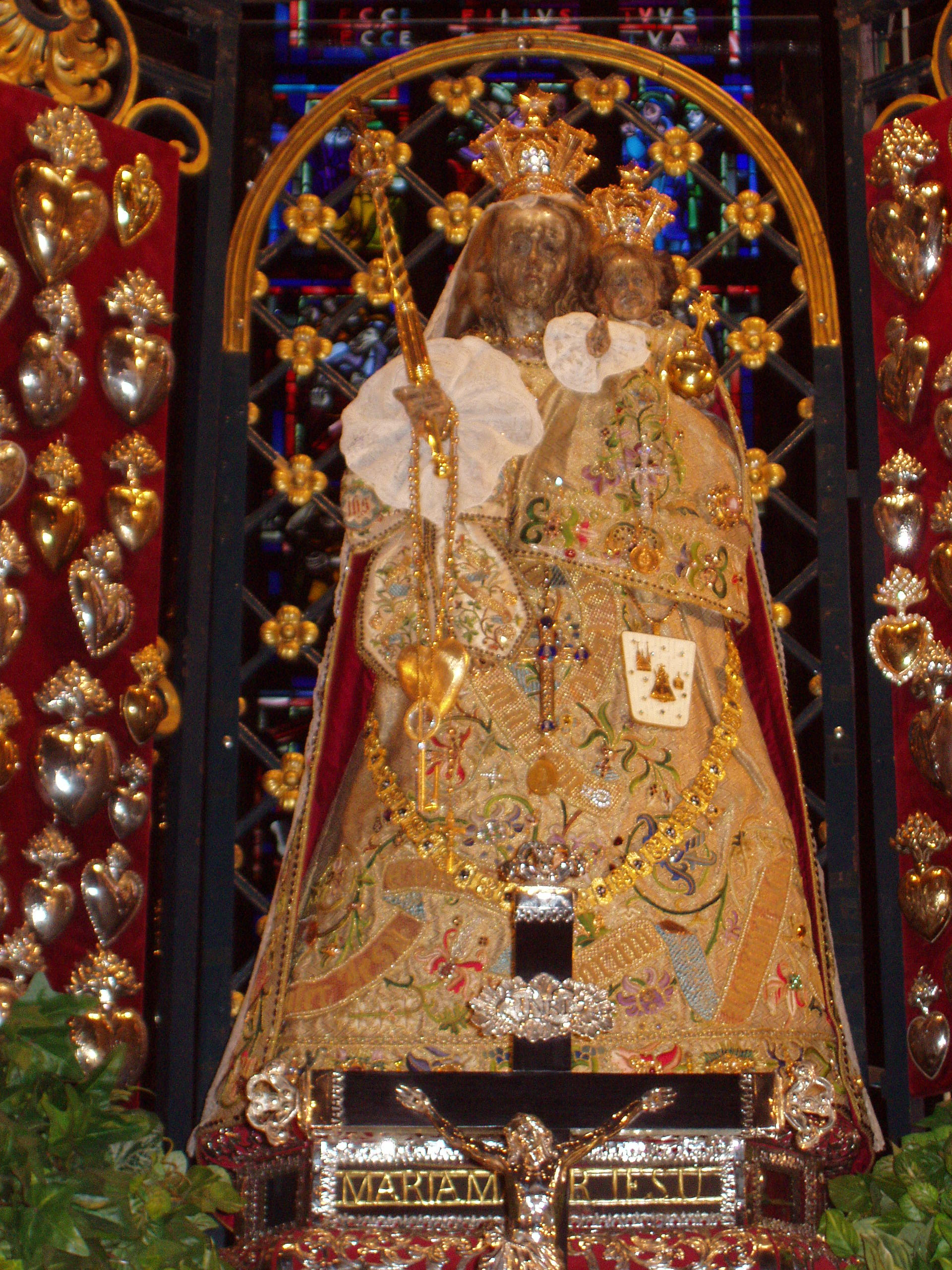
The Marian image prior to its artistic restoration in 2008.

Various hymns have been composed in honour of Our Lady of Luxembourg, the two most popular being O Mamm, léif Mamm do uewen and Léif Mamm, ech weess et net ze son. These two hymns were written in Luxembourgish language. During World War II, they took an even greater significance as their singing was outlawed by the Third Reich which considered them to be too "patriotic". Well into the 21st century, they remain chosen hymns of the Archdiocese of Luxembourg.

O Mamm, léif Mamm do uewen (O Mother, dear Mother in Heaven)
Original lyrics	English translation
O Mamm, léif Mamm do uewen Ech hunn dech eenzeg gier Däin Numm ass mir gegruewen An d'Hierz bis an de Kier Däin Numm ass mir gegruewen An d'Hierz bis an de Kier	O Mother, dear Mother in Heaven I love you more than all Your name is deeply graven Into my heart and soul Your name is deeply graven Into my heart and soul

Originating from Mullendorff, “O Mamm, leif Mamm do uewen” won citizenship at the Cathedral of Luxembourg and was set to music by P. A. Barthel.

Léif Mamm, ech weess et net ze son was composed by Luxembourgish priest Josef Biwer in the first half of the twentieth century. It is considered as one of the "Nationallieder" or national hymns of Luxembourg.

Léif Mamm, ech weess et net ze son (Dear mother, I cannot describe you)
Original lyrics	English translation
Léif Mamm, ech weess et net ze son Wéi gär ech bei dir sinn Léif Mamm, ech kann net vun dir gon Bis ech erhéiert ginn Léif Mamm, du hëlleg Kinnegin Looss all deng Kanner bei dir sinn Géi du mat hinnen Hand an Hand A seen, a seen onst Lëtzebuerger Land!	Dear mother, I cannot describe you How much I love to be with you Dear mother, with you I want to stay Until I get response Dear mother, you holy holy Queen Let all your children with you be Oh, walk with them all, hand in hand And bless, and bless our Luxembourger Land!

== The Feast of Oktav ==
The devotion to Our Lady of Luxembourg is celebrated with great solemnity during the Oktav, which is a two-week celebration which ends with a pontifical mass celebrated by the archbishop in presence of the Grand Duke, who also takes part in the eucharistic procession and the renewal of the consecration to our Lady.
