= Léon Lommel =

Luxembourgish prelate

- Bishop of Luxembourg
- Church: Catholic Church
- Diocese: Diocese of Luxembourg
- In office: 21 October 1956 – 13 February 1971
- Predecessor: Joseph Laurent Philippe
- Successor: Jean Hengen
- Previous posts: Titular Bishop of Nephelis (1949-1956); Coadjutor Bishop of Luxembourg (1949-1956)

Orders
- Ordination: 13 July 1919
- Consecration: 29 June 1949 by Fernando Cento

Personal details
- Born: 3 February 1893 Schleederhaff, Cruchten, Luxembourg
- Died: 11 June 1978 (aged 85)
- Coat of arms

Styles of Léon Lommel
- Reference style: The Most Reverend
- Spoken style: Your Excellency
- Religious style: Monsignor
- Posthumous style: none

Léon Lommel (3 February 1893 – 11 June 1978) was a Luxembourgish prelate of the Roman Catholic Church. He served as Bishop of Luxembourg from 1956 to 1971.

== Biography ==
Léon Lommel was born in Schleiderhof, as the son of a farmer. He studied in Echternach, Luxembourg, Rome, and Innsbruck. He was ordained to the priesthood on 13 July 1919. Lommel later obtained his doctorate in philosophy and Licentiate in Theology, and taught philosophy and sacred art at the Seminary of Luxembourg.

As a canon of Luxembourg Cathedral, he worked with architect Hubert Schumacher on its expansion from 1935 to 1938. During World War II, he was sent to France after being interrogated by the Gestapo; he worked in reconstructing his country's churches and chapels after returning there following the end of the war.

On 14 May 1949 Lommel was appointed Coadjutor bishop of Luxembourg and Titular bishop of Nephelis by Pope Pius XII, receiving his episcopal consecration on the following 29 June from Fernando Cardinal Cento.

He later succeeded Joseph Philippe, SCI, as the seventh Bishop of Luxembourg upon the latter's death on 21 October 1956. On 8 September 1957, Lommel blessed the Luxembourg Miner's Monument.

From 1962 to 1965, Lommel attended the Second Vatican Council, in which he was an enthusiastic and engaged participant.

Lommel visited the Midwest United States in 1965.

The elderly Bishop's resignation was accepted by Pope Paul VI on 13 February 1971, after fifteen years of service, passing on the governance of the diocese to his coadjutor, Bishop Jean Hengen.

Lommel died later died at the age of 85. He is buried in the crypt of the Cathedral of Luxembourg.

Catholic Church titles
Preceded by Joseph Philippe, SCI	Bishop of Luxembourg; 21 October 1956 – 13 February 1971	Succeeded by Jean Hengen
