= Jean-Claude Hollerich =

Luxembourgish Catholic cardinal (born 1958)

His Eminence Jean-Claude Hollerich SJ
- Cardinal, Archbishop of Luxembourg
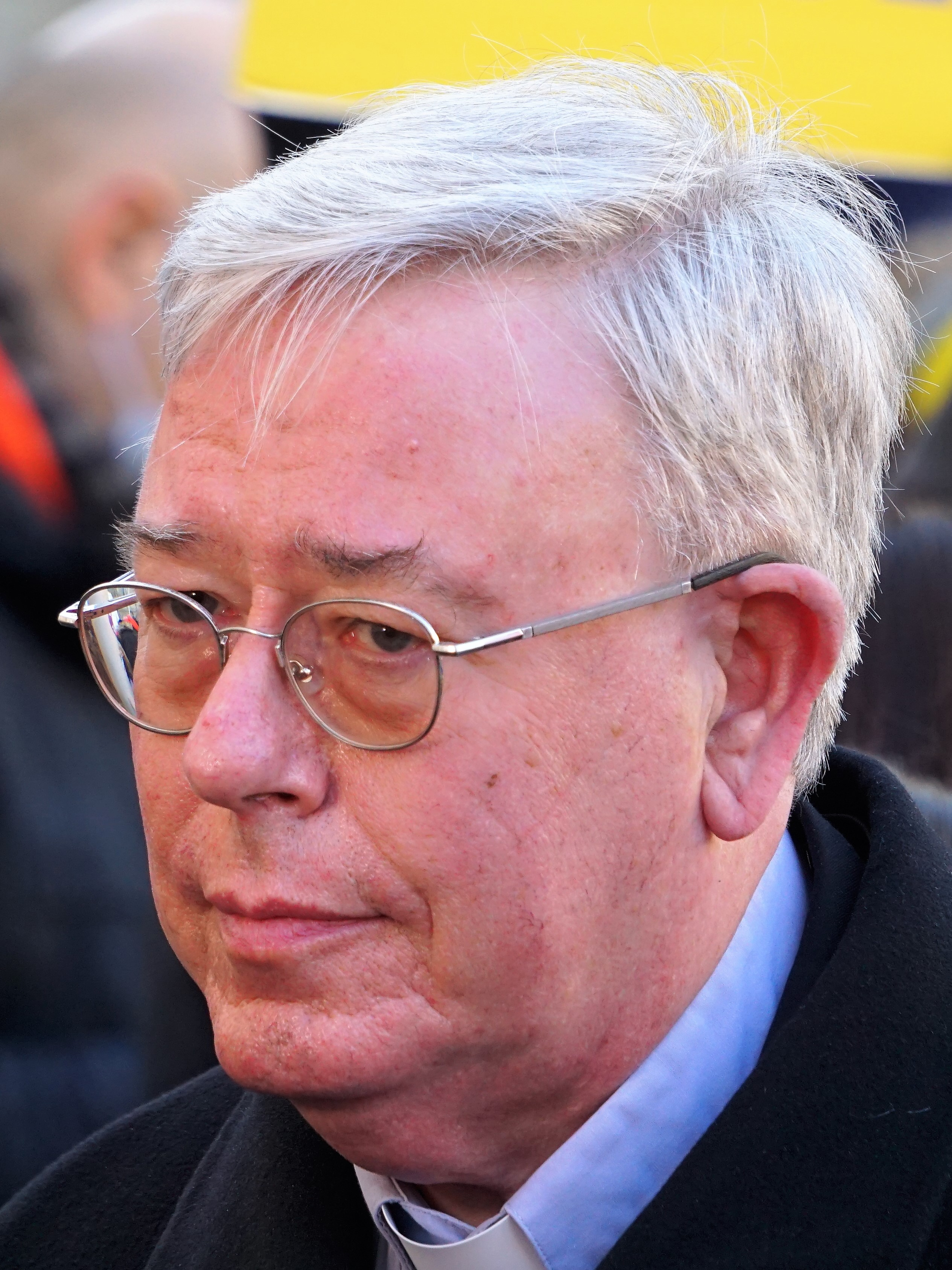
- Hollerich in 2022.
- Church: Catholic Church
- Archdiocese: Luxembourg
- See: Luxembourg
- Appointed: 12 July 2011
- Installed: 16 October 2011
- Predecessor: Fernand Franck
- Other posts: President of the European Episcopal Conferences (2018-2023); Cardinal-Priest of San Giovanni Crisostomo al Monte Sacro Alto (2019-)

Orders
- Ordination: 21 April 1990
- Consecration: 16 October 2011 by Fernand Franck
- Created cardinal: 5 October 2019 by Pope Francis
- Rank: Cardinal-Priest

Personal details
- Born: Jean-Claude Hollerich; 9 August 1958 (age 68) Differdange, Luxembourg
- Education: Pontifical Gregorian University; Sankt Georgen Graduate School of Philosophy and Theology; Sophia University; LMU Munich; Center for European Integration Studies
- Motto: Annuntiate (Announce)
- Coat of arms: Jean-Claude Hollerich's coat of arms

Jean-Claude Robert Guy Hollerich SJ (born 9 August 1958) is a Luxembourgish Catholic prelate who has served as Archbishop of Luxembourg since 2011. He was the president of the Commission of the Bishops' Conferences of the European Union (COMECE) from March 2018 to 2023. He is a member of the Jesuits.

In addition to studies and pastoral work in Belgium, Germany, and Luxembourg, he studied in Japan from 1985 to 1989 and worked there from 1994 to 2011.

Pope Francis raised him to the rank of cardinal on 5 October 2019, He is the first cardinal from Luxembourg. He is also a member of the Council of Cardinals.

Considered a close ally of Pope Francis, Hollerich was, before and during the conclave that followed his death, cited by a number of observers as a papabile.

== Biography ==
Hollerich was born on 9 August 1958 in Differdange to Emile Hollerich and Marie-Anne Wester. He grew up in Vianden and attended the École Apostolique of Clairefontaine in Eischen and the Lycée Classique in Diekirch. From 1978 to 1981 he studied Catholic Theology and Philosophy at the Pontifical Gregorian University in Rome. On 27 September 1981 he joined the Jesuits. After a novitiate in Namur from 1981 to 1983, he did pastoral work from 1983 to 1985 in Luxembourg. From 1985 to 1989, Hollerich studied Japanese language and culture as well as theology at Sophia University in Tokyo. He earned a theological licentiate in 1990 from the Sankt Georgen Graduate School of Philosophy and Theology in Frankfurt am Main.

On 21 April 1990 he was ordained a priest in Brussels. From 1990 to 1994 he earned a licentiate in German language and literature at LMU Munich. Until 2001 he was a doctoral student at the Centre for European Integration Studies in Bonn. On 18 October 2002, Hollerich took his perpetual vows in St. Ignatius' church in Tokyo. He is a member of the Japanese Jesuit province and was a professor of German, French and European studies (1994-2011) and Vice-Rector for General and Student Affairs of the Sophia University in Tokyo.

Pope Benedict XVI appointed Hollerich Archbishop of Luxembourg on 12 July 2011. He received his episcopal consecration on 16 October 2011 in the cathedral in Luxembourg from his predecessor Fernand Franck; the co-consecrators were the Archbishop of Cologne, Joachim Cardinal Meisner and the Archbishop of Tokyo, Peter Takeo Okada. He is the eighth Bishop and third Archbishop of Luxembourg.

Hollerich presided at the wedding of Guillaume, Hereditary Grand Duke of Luxembourg and Countess Stéphanie de Lannoy at Luxembourg's Notre-Dame Cathedral on 20 October 2012.

He has held leadership positions in a number of European associations. He was President of the Conference of European Justice and Peace Commissions from 2014 to 2018 and became President of the Council of Bishops' Conferences of Europe's Commission for Youth in September 2017. In March 2018, he was elected to a five-year term as president of the Commission of the Bishops' Conferences of the European Union (COMECE). Pope Francis appointed him to participate in the 2018 Synod of Bishops on Youth, Faith, and vocational discernment.

Since 1994, Hollerich has been a member of the Catholic student fraternity, AV Edo-Rhenania zu Tokio and of AV Rheinstein zu Köln im CV.

On 5 October 2019, Pope Francis made him Cardinal-Priest of San Giovanni Crisostomo a Monte Sacro Alto. Interviewed shortly afterwards, he supported the ordination of married men to the Catholic priesthood. He said: "I love my celibacy, I stand by it, but I see that married deacons can preach differently than I do, and I find that in itself a wonderful addition."

He was made a member of the Pontifical Council for Culture on 21 February 2020 and member of the Pontifical Council for Interreligious Dialogue on 8 July 2020.

In September 2020, he suggested that the limitations placed by the COVID-19 pandemic on access to the sacraments and church instruction programs will result in a smaller Church, because those who attend for cultural reasons will have learned to live without the Church. He thought this only exacerbated current trends, because "this merely cultural Catholicism, cannot last over time". He also said he supported asking the "big questions" but hoped the anticipated German synod would recognize its obligations to the Church worldwide. He thought the most important question was the role of women in the Church and expressed a willingness to consider the ordination of women: "I just don't know. But I am open to it. It is clear, however, that the current situation is not enough. You have to see and notice that women have a say in the church."

Hollerich said in an interview with the Croatian Catholic weekly, Glas Koncila, that while Pope Francis does not want the ordination of women, "I am a promoter of giving women more pastoral responsibility. And if we achieve that, then we can perhaps see if there still is a desire among women for ordination," he added.

On 8 July 2021, Pope Francis appointed him relator general of the 2023 synod of bishops.

In 2022, Hollerich said he considered the church's teaching that homosexual relationships are sinful to be wrong: "I believe that the sociological-scientific foundation of this teaching is no longer correct." In response, an anonymous memo later revealed to have been authored by Cardinal George Pell referred to Hollerich as "explicitly heretical."

On 7 March 2023, Hollerich was appointed to the Council of Cardinal Advisors.

Hollerich participated as a cardinal elector in the 2025 papal conclave that elected Pope Leo XIV.

In March 2026 Hollerich pubically voiced his advocacy for the ordination of women, saying that he did not envision a future of the church without them. Hollerich claimed that 90% of the laity he has talked to share his views.

== Views ==
Hollerich has advocated for change to the language of the Catechism of the Catholic Church regarding homosexuality.

== See also ==
- Cardinals created by Francis

Catholic Church titles
Preceded by Fernand Franck	Archbishop of Luxembourg; 12 July 2011 –	Incumbent
Preceded by Reinhard Marx	President of the Commission of the Bishops' Conferences of the European Community; 8 March 2018 –	Incumbent
Preceded by José de Jesús Pimiento Rodriguez	Cardinal-Priest of San Giovanni Crisostomo a Monte Sacro Alto; 5 October 2019 –	Incumbent
