= Fernand Franck =

Luxembourgish prelate

His Excellency Fernand Franck
- Archbishop Emeritus of Luxembourg
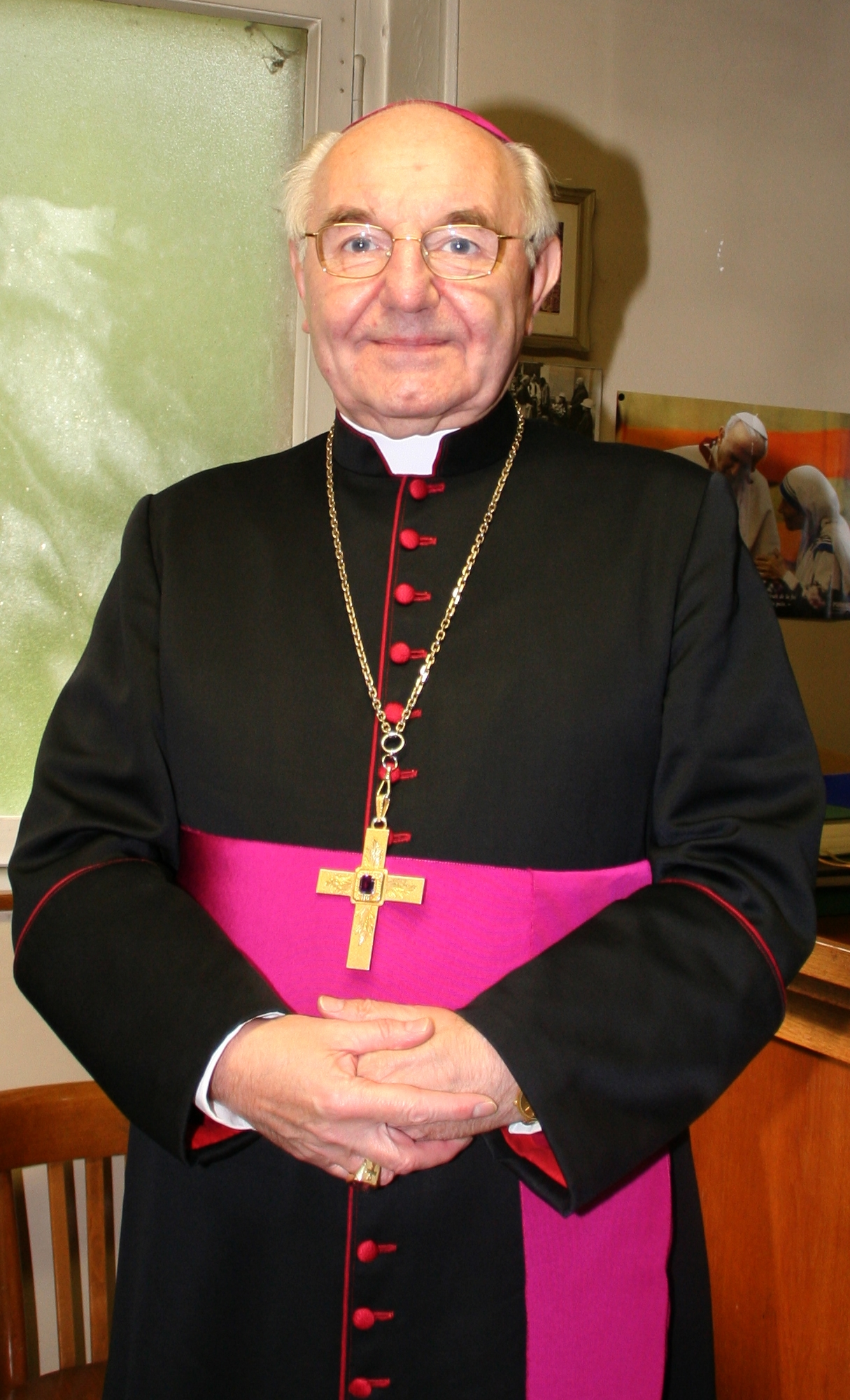
- Church: Roman Catholic
- Archdiocese: Luxembourg
- Appointed: 21 December 1990
- In office: 1991-2011
- Predecessor: Jean Hengen
- Successor: Jean-Claude Hollerich

Orders
- Ordination: 29 June 1960
- Consecration: 2 February 1991 by Jean Hengen

Personal details
- Born: 6 May 1934 (age 92) Esch-sur-Alzette Luxembourg
- Denomination: Roman Catholic
- Motto: Ut unum sint (That They May Be One)

Fernand Franck (born 6 May 1934) is a Luxembourgish prelate of the Catholic Church. He was Archbishop of Luxembourg from 1990 to 2011.

== Biography ==
He was born in Esch-sur-Alzette on 6 May 1934 and attended primary and secondary school in Esch-sur-Alzette and seminary in Luxembourg and Münster, Germany. Ordained a priest in 1960, Franck's first assignment was as associate pastor at St. Joseph Parish in Differdange, where he served until 1971. He then became pastor at St. Cuningundis Parish in Clausen, and also served as National Director for the Catholic Action of Children in Luxembourg and the Pontifical Mission Aid Society, both 1969–1977.

From 1977, Franck was Secretary General of the Society for the Propagation of the Faith at the Vatican and served as Secretary General of the Society of St. Peter the Apostle in Rome from 1988. His mission led him to visit many countries across every continent. In conjunction with these offices, he was also named Ecclesiastical Counsellor at the Embassy of Luxembourg at the Holy See (from 1981) and was a member of the Pontifical Council for Social Communications at the Vatican.

Pope John Paul II appointed him Archbishop of Luxembourg on 21 December 1990 and he was ordained a bishop on 2 February 1991 at Notre-Dame Cathedral in Luxembourg City. His motto Ut unum sint, (English: that they may be one, (John 17:11)) has inspired his pastoral leadership and his constant dedication to both the local and central Church. He serves on different European Episcopal Commissions and is a member of the Pontifical Council for Social Communications since 1999. He is the Grand Prior of the Luxembourg Lieutenancy of the Equestrian Order of the Holy Sepulchre of Jerusalem.

Sacred Heart University, which operates an overseas campus in Luxembourg, recognised his outstanding leadership and his ongoing support of the laity in the Church by conferring on him an honorary doctorate in humane letters in 2003.

Pope Benedict XVI accepted his resignation as Archbishop of Luxembourg on 12 July 2011.

Religious titles
Preceded by Jean Hengen	Archbishop of Luxembourg; 21 December 1990 – 12 July 2011	Succeeded by Jean-Claude Hollerich
