= Education Law of 1912 =

Luxembourgish law

The Education Law of 1912 (Luxembourgish: Schoulgesetz), also called the "loi Braun", was passed on 25 June 1912 by the Chamber of Deputies of Luxembourg. The law concerned primary school education in the country and was intended to modernise education, introducing several new subjects and heavily reducing the role of the Church in education.

== Contents ==
The law introduced the following changes:

- Abolition of school fees
- 7 years of obligatory schooling
- Reduction of maximum class sizes to 70
- Singing, gymnastics, drawing, and a basic knowledge of biology and physics, were introduced as new subjects
- Luxembourgish became a mandatory subject

The second part of the law concerned the status of teachers. It included the following measures:

- Right of the teacher (or a representative of the teachers) to be a member of the local commune's school commission
- The law requiring teachers to participate in religious education was abolished
- Teachers no longer needed a certificate of their religious standing, in order to be employed
- The local pastor was no longer responsible for supervising teachers

== Background and passage ==
It was believed that, with the (relatively late) industrialisation of the country, the population needed a suitable education to enable them to work in the new sectors of the economy. In the preceding years, more or less all the senior jobs in the steel industry, from foremen to engineers, had been taken by Germans. The basis for a good vocational training, was a solid primary school education. Another background motivation for the law was to introduce a broader education, beyond just literacy and numeracy, with a view to introducing universal suffrage (which was to happen in 1919).

The vote in the Chamber was preceded by a long political debate between the Left Bloc on the one hand, and the Right Bloc on the other. Especially the second part of the law was heavily criticised by the Church. Adherents of the Left Bloc, on the other hand, did not believe the law went far enough. The Chamber finally approved the law by 34 for, 17 against, with 1 abstention.

On 10 July 1912 the Director-General (Minister) Pierre Braun presented the law to Grand Duchess Marie-Adelaide for her signature. She signed it on 10 August 1912, although reluctantly, as she saw it as a matter of conscience. As a staunch Catholic, she was initially unwilling to approve a law described by the church authorities as unacceptable and unworkable.

Her reluctance to give her signature was one of the criticisms leveled at her later in 1919, and which contributed to her abdication.

The new law passed by the Chamber did not satisfy either side, neither the Catholic Church nor the anticlericals. Bishop Jean-Joseph Koppes stated that he refused the collaboration of the priests, and that catechism would henceforth be given in premises of the parish church until the government agreed to place religious education at the centre of the school curriculum. In 1913, when the issue of salaries for priests was debated in Parliament, the social democrats and radical liberals consequently demanded the abolition of the payment of priests' salaries by the State, since, in the words of Differdange's mayor, Émile Mark, the clergy could be accused of "direct incitement to disobedience to the laws of the State."

== Long-term aftermath ==
The stance of the Catholic Church eventually softened. In June 1920, the newly appointed bishop, Pierre Nommesch, successfully negotiated a compromise with the government, resulting in a minor amendment to the law in 1921. This amendment allowed teachers to once again participate in religious education specifically at their own request, rather than at the request of the priest, as had been the case between 1898 and 1912. Pleased with this resolution, Bishop Nommesch directed priests to conduct religious instruction classes within the school premises once again. This decision reinstated the presence of the clergy in public schools and ended the situation where clergymen had refrained from entering schools since 1912. The 1921 adaptations did not change the separation between secular education (provided by teachers) and religious education (provided by priests). The leadership of the government by the Catholic Party of the Right since 1919 likely contributed to easing the Catholic Church's mistrust of the state. Despite the dominance of the Party of the Right and its successor, the CSV, in national politics since 1919, the fundamental separation between secular and religious education was never challenged. The 1921 compromise finally ended the school dispute (German: Schulstreit) between Church and State which had been ongoing since 1843.

The 1912 school law is viewed as a historical compromise that did not fully satisfy either the Church or the anticlericals. However, the Braun Law, with its pedagogical innovations, facilitated Luxembourg's entry into the industrial age by aiming to provide vocational training for young Luxembourgers. Despite numerous legislative changes over the years, the essence of the 1912 law endures. The objectives of public education persist in preparing children for life using innovative methods, offering training tailored to societal needs, and shaping them into citizens of a democratic society.

== See also ==
- Education in Luxembourg
