= Nicolas Adames =

First Bishop of Luxembourg

Archbishop Nikolaus Adames
- Bishop Emeritus of Luxembourg
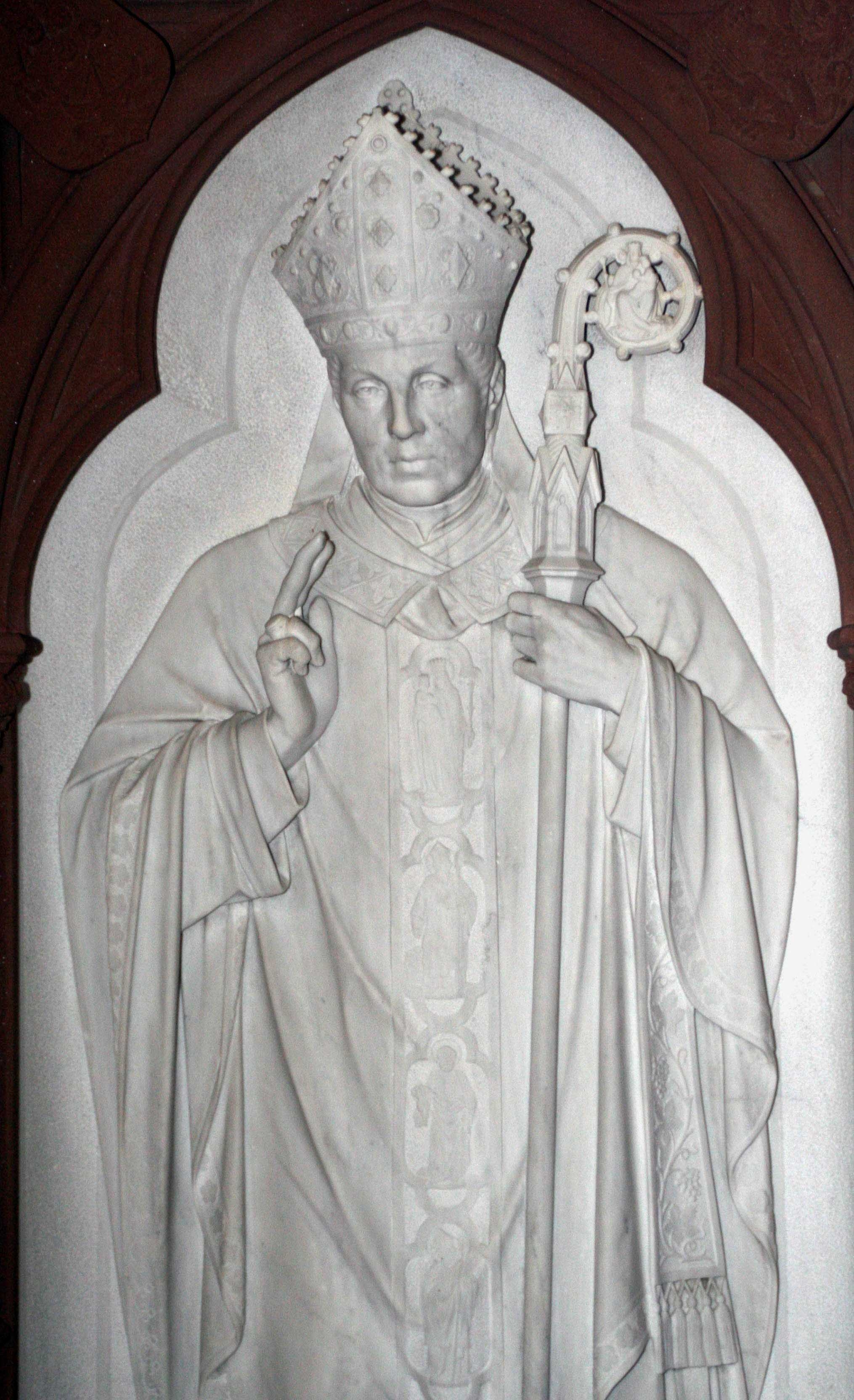
- See: Luxembourg
- Appointed: 2 November 1883
- Installed: 25 December 1870
- Term ended: 27 September 1883

Orders
- Ordination: 25 August 1839
- Consecration: 29 June 1863 by Nicolas-Joseph Dehesselle

Personal details
- Born: Nikolaus Adames; December 29, 1813 Ulflingen
- Died: February 13, 1887 (aged 73)
- Denomination: Catholic

Ordination history of Nicolas Adames
History
Episcopal consecration
- Consecrated by: Nicolas-Joseph Dehesselle

Nicolas Adames (29 December 1813 – 13 February 1887) was the first Bishop of Luxembourg.

== Life ==
He was born in Troisvierges in 1813, the only child of the farmer Jean Adames and Marie Magdalena Wangen.

Nicolas Adames' father died in 1818 before he was five years old. His mother became remarried to a widower, Nikolaus Köcher from Basbellain, with whom she had more children. In his village, Nicolas started teaching at the age of 12. He learned French in Belgium, and worked for an accountant for one year. Under his village priest, he studied to join the Petit Séminaire in Bastogne, but went instead to the seminary in Namur, and was ordained a priest on 25 August 1839.

In 1841 he became a chaplain in Arlon, then Echternach, before Bishop Jean-Théodore Laurent, the Apostolic Vicar in Luxembourg from 1840, made Adames priest of the Notre-Dame Church of the fortress city of Luxembourg. In 1845 he became the bishop's secretary.

When Jean-Théodore Laurent had to leave the country under pressure from anti-clericalists, Nicolas Adames provisionally administered the Apostolic Vicariate, with the title of Apostolic Provicar. During this period, Luxembourg and its majority Catholic population were ruled by the Protestant Dutch King-Grand Duke William II, and by an anti-church government.

On 27 March 1863 he was appointed titular bishop of Halicarnassos by Pope Pius IX, and made Apostolic Vicar of Luxembourg. His consecration was on 29 June 1863 under a picture of the Virgin Mary in the Church of Notre-Dame. In December 1869 he participated, as one of 744, in the First Vatican Council in Rome.

On 27 June 1870, the Apostolic Vicariate of Luxembourg was elevated to a diocese, and Nicolas Adames became the first Bishop of Luxembourg. His enthronement was on 25 December. The Church of Notre-Dame became the episcopal see, and thus, a cathedral.

When his successor, Jean Joseph Koppes, was appointed in 1883 by Pope Leo XIII, Nicolas Adames retired to the Redemptorist monastery on the Place du Théâtre. He died on 13 February 1887. For political reasons he was buried on 17 February in the Glacis chapel, which had been built at his instigation.

== Work ==
As pro-vicar, Adames had seen it as his goal to promote a real religiosity through popular missions. For this reason, he called the Redemptorists to Luxembourg in 1849, who settled around the Saint-Alphonse Church.

Although he had not yet been consecrated a bishop, he received permission in 1859 to administer the sacrament of confirmation. In 4 years, he confirmed around 57,000 people on his many parish visits. This created a strong awareness of the church amongst the population. He was also not afraid to officially condemn the reading and spreading of anti-clerical texts.

For the second centenary of the election of Mary the Comforter in 1866 the shrine image was ceremonially crowned, at the wish of the Pope, by Cardinal Karl von Reisach and 7 other bishops on 2 July 1866. The Muttergottesoktav or Virgin Mary octave was thus strengthened.

Nicolas Adames took an oath in case Luxembourg remained unharmed in the Franco-Prussian War of 1870 and retained its internationally recognised neutrality. He had pledged to build a chapel to the Virgin Mary with his own money in front of the former city walls on the Glacis. On 8 September 1885, the Glacis chapel was consecrated by his successor, Bishop Koppes.

He showed his loyalty to the Pope in defending papal infallibility at the First Vatican Council.

Elements of Adames's administration of his new bishopric still exist today, such as the Kirchlicher Anzeiger für die Diözese Luxemburg.

Catholic Church titles
Preceded by Jan Dekert	— TITULAR — Bishop of Halicarnassus; 27 March 1863 - 30 September 1870	Succeeded by Ezechias Banci, O.F.M.
Preceded by Jean-Théodore Laurent	Apostolic Vicar of Luxembourg; 1863 – 1870	Promoted to Bishopric
New title Promoted to Bishopric	Bishop of Luxembourg; 1870 – 1883	Succeeded by Johannes Joseph Koppes
