= Jean-Théodore Laurent =

19th century Apostolic Vicar of Luxembourg

- Apostolic Vicar of Luxembourg
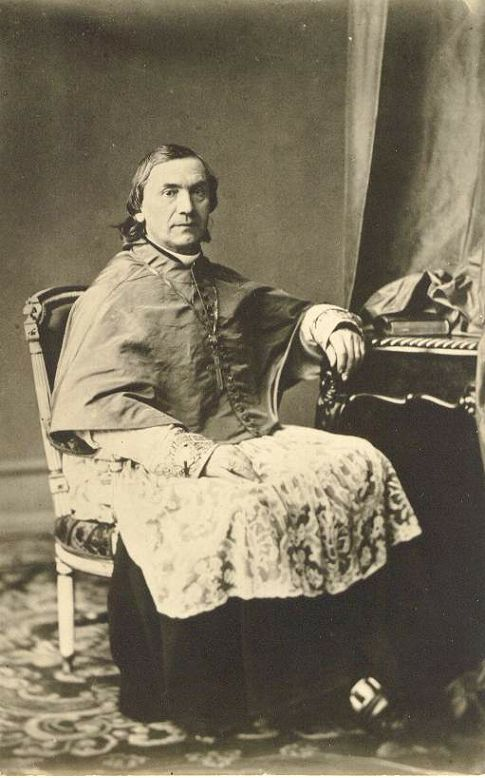
- Native name: Johannes Theodor Laurent
- Church: Catholic Church
- See: Apostolic Vicariate of Luxembourg
- In office: 25 February 1842 – 28 July 1856
- Predecessor: Johann Theodor van der Noot
- Successor: Nicolas Adames
- Other post: Titular Bishop of Chersonesus in Creta (1839-1884)
- Previous post: Vicar Apostolic of the Nordic Missions (1839-1842)

Orders
- Ordination: 14 March 1829
- Consecration: 27 December 1839 by Cornelius Richard Anton van Bommel

Personal details
- Born: 6 July 1804 Aix-la-Chapelle, Roer, French Republic
- Died: 20 February 1884 (aged 79) Simpelveld, Limburg, Kingdom of the Netherlands

Jean-Théodore Laurent (French pronunciation: [ʒɑ̃ teɔdɔʁ lɔʁɑ̃]; 6 July 1804 – 20 February 1884) was the Apostolic Vicar of Luxembourg from 1841 to 1856.

== Biography ==
Laurent was born in 1804 in Aachen to a family of modest means. His father, the Luxembourger Franz Laurent, had 14 children with his wife Gertrude Schönen, originally from Aachen. After attending a Gymnasium in Aachen, Laurent studied theology for two years in Bonn. As he disliked the lectures by Professor Georg Hermes, he moved to the diocese of Liège, where he continued his studies in the seminary. Here he was ordained a priest on 14 March 1829. From 1829 to 1835 he was a vicar in Heerlen, and from 1835 to 1839 worked as a parson in Gemmenich in Belgium, near Plombières. During this period the Cologne church controversy was escalating, in which he was involved through his own writings, and in which he took the side of the founder of the Aachener Priesterkreis and ultramontanist, Leonhard Aloys Joseph Nellessen, arguing against the tenets of Hermesianism.

The Leuven Professor Karl Möller and the Nuntius in Brussels, Raffaele Fornari, were friends with Laurent, and on 17 September 1839 he was appointed Apostolic Vicar of the Nordic Missions and titular bishop of Chersonesus in Crete. He was consecrated on 27 December 1839 in Liège. As Laurent was rejected by the Prussian government due to his position during the church controversy, his appointment was untenable, and he asked to be relieved of his office on 15 November 1840. Until then, he had resided in Aachen.

On 1 December 1841 he was appointed successor to the outgoing Apostolic Vicar of Luxembourg, Johann Theodor van der Noot, who formally retired on 20 February 1842. The appointment was initially kept a secret at the wish of Grand Duke William II of Luxembourg (who was also King of the Netherlands in personal union). Confrontations ensued between Laurent, oriented towards Rome, and the liberal Luxembourgish government. Laurent, more reckless than diplomatic, made efforts to establish a seminary, a regulated parish system, and to strengthen church influence in the schools.

During the Revolution of 1848-1849, false accusations were levelled against the Bishop, and the government increasingly agitated for his dismissal. He finally left Luxembourg on 1 May 1848. Numerous pleas from e.g. the Dutch King, still did not lead the government to soften their tone. In the end, Laurent submitted his resignation on 2 June 1856, at the request of Pope Pius IX. This was accepted on 10 July 1856, and the Luxembourgish government agreed to award him a pension. On 20 May 1856, there had been a formal statement in Luxembourg which rehabilitated the Bishop.

In Aachen, he lived with his brother, the city archivist and librarian Josef Laurent, and was involved in the foundation of several monasteries, specifically that of the Sisters of the Poor Child Jesus, of which he was the spiritual director and in whose church he often preached. In 1879 he followed them to Simpelveld, as they had to go into exile during the Kulturkampf, and functioned as their resident cleric. Here he died in 1884; his grave is in the cemetery of the Sisters.

Laurent was a complicated person and characterised by a certain imbalance. Guided in his actions by feelings and moods, he followed his sympathies and antipathies, and could appear spontaneous and energetic in his statements. At other times, he was filled with melancholy and gloom. In matters concerning the Catholic Church, however, he was always full of energy, without compromise, and always ready for a fight. He saw himself as the warrior of an orthodox faith, rejecting anything that hinted of Hermesianism. Equipped with his great theological knowledge, he was however less of a scholar, than an agitator and attacker. His bravery, sincerity and devoutness also brought respect from his opponents.

Catholic Church titles
Preceded by Johann Theodor van der Noot	Apostolic Vicar of Luxembourg; 1841 – 1856	Succeeded by Nicolas Adames
