= Nicolas-Joseph Dehesselle =

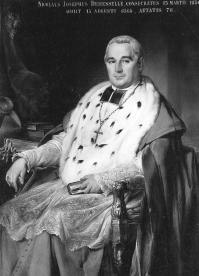

Nicolas-Joseph Dehesselle (1789–1865) was a 19th-century bishop of Namur in Belgium.

== Life ==
Dehesselle was born in Charneux and educated in Herve before attending Namur Seminary. He was ordained to the priesthood in 1812 and spent five years in the parish of Saint-Nicolas, Liège, before being appointed president of the seminary in Namur in 1817. In 1833 he was named vicar general of the diocese of Namur, and in 1835 bishop. He died on 15 August 1865.

== Honours ==
- Officer of the Order of Leopold, 19 July 1856.
