= Johannes Joseph Koppes =

Bishop Johannes Joseph Koppes
- Bishop of Luxembourg
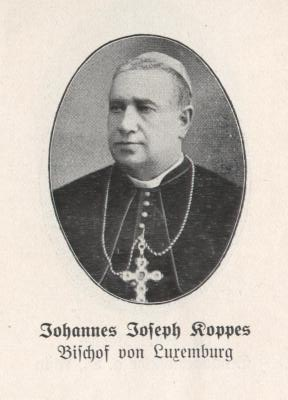
- See: Luxembourg
- Appointed: 28 September 1883
- Installed: 4 November 1883
- Term ended: 29 November 1918

Orders
- Ordination: 28 August 1868
- Consecration: 4 November 1883 by Edward Henry Howard

Personal details
- Born: Johannes Joseph Koppes; September 16, 1843 Canach
- Died: November 30, 1918 (aged 75)
- Denomination: Catholic

Jean Joseph Alphonse Koppes (16 September 1843 – 29 November 1918) was Bishop of Luxembourg from 1883 to 1918.

== Life ==
Johannes Joseph Koppes was born in Canach in 1843, the son of a schoolteacher Johann (Jean) Koppes and his wife Anna Maria née Ernster.

At the age of 25, he was ordained a priest on 28 August 1868, and worked as a parson in Esch-Alzette.

On 28 September 1883 he was appointed Bishop of Luxembourg, and was consecrated on 4 November of the same year by Cardinal Edward Henry Howard. Only the second person to hold the office since Luxembourg became a diocese in 1870, he exercised this function until his death on 29 November 1918.

His election as Bishop was supported by seminary professor Dominik Hengesch (1844–1899) and Msgr. Francesco Spolverini (1838–1918), the Internuntius for Luxembourg. Nikolaus Nilles SJ, who was initially a candidate, also supported Koppes in Rome. Koppes' motto as Bishop was Pax et Veritas.

At the beginning of his tenure as bishop, he officially recognised the controversial Dominican community of the monastery on Limpertsberg around the stigmatised Anna Moes (1832–1895). He supported Catholic associations, which were primarily sustained by laypeople and were inspired by German Catholicism: he encouraged the foundation of a Catholic folk high school, Catholic popular societies, an academic association, and the Party of the Right. This helped ensure that Catholicism would become the leading cultural as well as political force in society after the First World War.

His time in office also saw fierce and bitter public disputes, amongst other things over the controversial education law of 1912 and over press issues, in which Koppes took an uncompromising stance, and which damaged church-state relations (which had never been good in the 19th century). After the passage of the 1912 education law, he banned the Deputies who had voted for the law from receiving communion.

Koppes' historical reputation is that of a combative bishop, who fought actively against liberalism, socialism and Freemasonry. In the church terminology of the day, he was seen as an ultramontanist.

He regularly participated as a guest in the meetings of German bishops in Fulda. In 1913, Koppes was a speaker at the Deutscher Katholikentag in Metz, .

His uncompromising nature led to several conflicts with the liberal government. After Koppes died in Luxembourg city in 1918, the city council denied permission for him to be buried in the cathedral. Instead, he was buried (like his predecessor Nicolas Adames) in the Glacis chapel in front of the walls of the former Fortress of Luxembourg.

Catholic Church titles
Preceded by Nicolas Adames	Bishop of Luxembourg; 1883 – 1918	Succeeded by Pierre Nommesch
