= List of archbishops of Luxembourg =

The archbishop of Luxembourg is the ordinary of the Roman Catholic archbishopric of Luxembourg. The position was created on 23 April 1988, when Luxembourg was promoted from a bishopric. The seat of the see is Notre-Dame Cathedral, in Luxembourg City.

== List of ordinaries ==
=== Bishops of Luxembourg ===
Name	Start date	End date
Nicolas Adames	26 June 1870	27 September 1883
Jean Joseph Koppes	4 November 1883	29 November 1918
Pierre Nommesch	8 March 1920	9 September 1935
Joseph Laurent Philippe	9 September 1935	21 October 1956
Léon Lommel	21 October 1956	13 February 1971
Jean Hengen	13 February 1971	23 April 1988

=== Archbishops of Luxembourg ===
Name	Start date	End date
Jean Hengen	23 April 1988	21 December 1990
Fernand Franck	21 December 1990	12 July 2011
Jean-Claude Hollerich	12 July 2011	Present day

== See also ==
- Roman Catholic Archdiocese of Luxembourg
