= Joseph Laurent Philippe =

Joseph Laurent Philippe S.C.I.
- Bishop of Luxembourg
- Church: Catholic Church
- Diocese: Diocese of Luxembourg
- In office: 9 October 1935 – 21 October 1956
- Predecessor: Pierre Nommesch
- Successor: Léon Lommel
- Previous posts: Superior General of the Congregation of the Priests of the Sacred Heart (1926-1935); Titular Bishop of Tinum (1935); Coadjutor Bishop of Luxembourg (1935)

Orders
- Ordination: 28 May 1904
- Consecration: 9 June 1935 by Francesco Marchetti Selvaggiani

Personal details
- Born: 3 April 1877 Rollingergrund, Luxembourg
- Died: 21 October 1956 (aged 79) Luxembourg City, Luxembourg

Joseph Laurent Philippe S.C.I. (3 April 1877 – 21 October 1956) was Bishop of Luxembourg from 1935 to 1956.

== Life ==
Born in Rollingergrund in 1877, Joseph Laurent Philippe was ordained a priest on 28 May 1904. On 20 January 1926 he was made Superior general of the Priests of the Sacred Heart.

On 25 April 1935, Pope Pius XI appointed him titular bishop of Tinum and coadjutor bishop of Luxembourg. His consecration took place on 9 June in Rome, by Francesco Cardinal Marchetti Selvaggiani. On 9 September 1935 he became Bishop of Luxembourg, succeeding Pierre Nommesch, who died in office. As Bishop, he argued for a revival of the Spiritual Exercises, and of religious traditions. He was also the first of the Bishops of Luxembourg to live in the Avenue Marie-Thérèse, on the land of the old Fort Maria Rheinsheim (part of the Fortress of Luxembourg), where his successor would build the episcopal palace of today in 1957.

His time in office saw the expansion of the cathedral from 1935 to 1938 and the German occupation of Luxembourg in World War II. A third of the churches and chapels in the diocese were destroyed in the war, especially from 1944 to 1945. Personally, Philippe did not confront the German occupiers, so as not to endanger religious and the activity of the church, which could already only exercise its functions to a limited extent. However, he avoided all contact with the German authorities, and made preparations in case the diocese became leaderless. The church was progressively forced out of public life by the German authorities; Christian organisations were forcibly dissolved, religious education was banned from the schools, the monasteries were abolished, and active religious communities were deprived of their property. The diocesan administration, on the other hand, remained the only intact Luxembourgish institution during World War II.

After the liberation of Luxembourg, Philippe set out rebuilding the church institutions. From 14 May 1949, he was assisted by a coadjutor bishop, in the form of Léon Lommel.

He died in Luxembourg city in 1956, and was succeeded by Lommel.

Religious titles
Preceded by Pierre Nommesch	Bishop of Luxembourg; 1935 – 1956	Succeeded by Léon Lommel
