= Pierre Nommesch =

Luxembourgish Catholic bishop

Bishop Pierre Nommesch
- Bishop of Luxembourg
- See: Luxembourg
- Appointed: 8 March 1920
- Installed: 25 March 1920
- Term ended: 9 October 1935

Orders
- Ordination: 28 October 1890
- Consecration: 25 March 1920 by Sebastiano Nicotra

Personal details
- Born: Pierre Nommesch; December 16, 1864 Greiveldange [Greiweldingen]
- Died: October 9, 1935 (aged 70)
- Denomination: Catholic

Ordination history of Pierre Nommesch
History
Episcopal consecration
- Principal consecrator: Sebastiano Nicotra
- Co-consecrators: Thomas Louis Heylen Antoine Alphonse de Wachter
Episcopal succession
Bishops consecrated by Pierre Nommesch as principal consecrator
- Jacques Mangers: 1932

Pierre Nommesch (16 December 1864 – 9 October 1935) was the Bishop of Luxembourg from 1920 to 1935.

== Biography ==
At the age of 26, on 28 October 1890, Nommesch was ordained a priest. On 8 March 1920, he was appointed Bishop of Luxembourg, and on 25 March 1920, was consecrated by Sebastiano Nicotra. He remained in office until his death.

He became bishop after a long period of sede vacante, which was due to challenges to Luxembourg's national sovereignty following the Armistice of World War I.

His time in office was marked by reconciliation and understanding between state and the church: The conflict around schools received a compromise solution in 1921, so that religious education, relegated to church parishes since 1912, once again had a place in public education. Under his episcopate, loyalty to the monarchy and to Luxembourgish traditions, closeness to Rome (with pilgrimages to the "holy city", and celebration of the papal coronation anniversaries), and veneration of the Virgin Mary (expansion of the cathedral, started in 1935) remained important facets of Luxembourgish Catholicism.

Further religious-pastoral highlights of his time in office included the Eucharistic National Congress in 1924, increased devotion to the Sacred Heart, the rebuilding of the seminary at Limpertsberg in 1930, and consolidation of associations in the Belgian-inspired Catholic Action after 1930.

== See also ==
Religious titles
Preceded by Johannes Joseph Koppes	Bishop of Luxembourg; 1920 – 1935	Succeeded by Joseph Laurent Philippe
