= Notre-Dame Cathedral, Luxembourg =

Roman Catholic cathedral of Luxembourg City

Cathedral of Our Lady of Consolation of Luxembourg Kathedral Notre-Dame Cathédrale Notre-Dame Kathedrale unserer lieben Frau
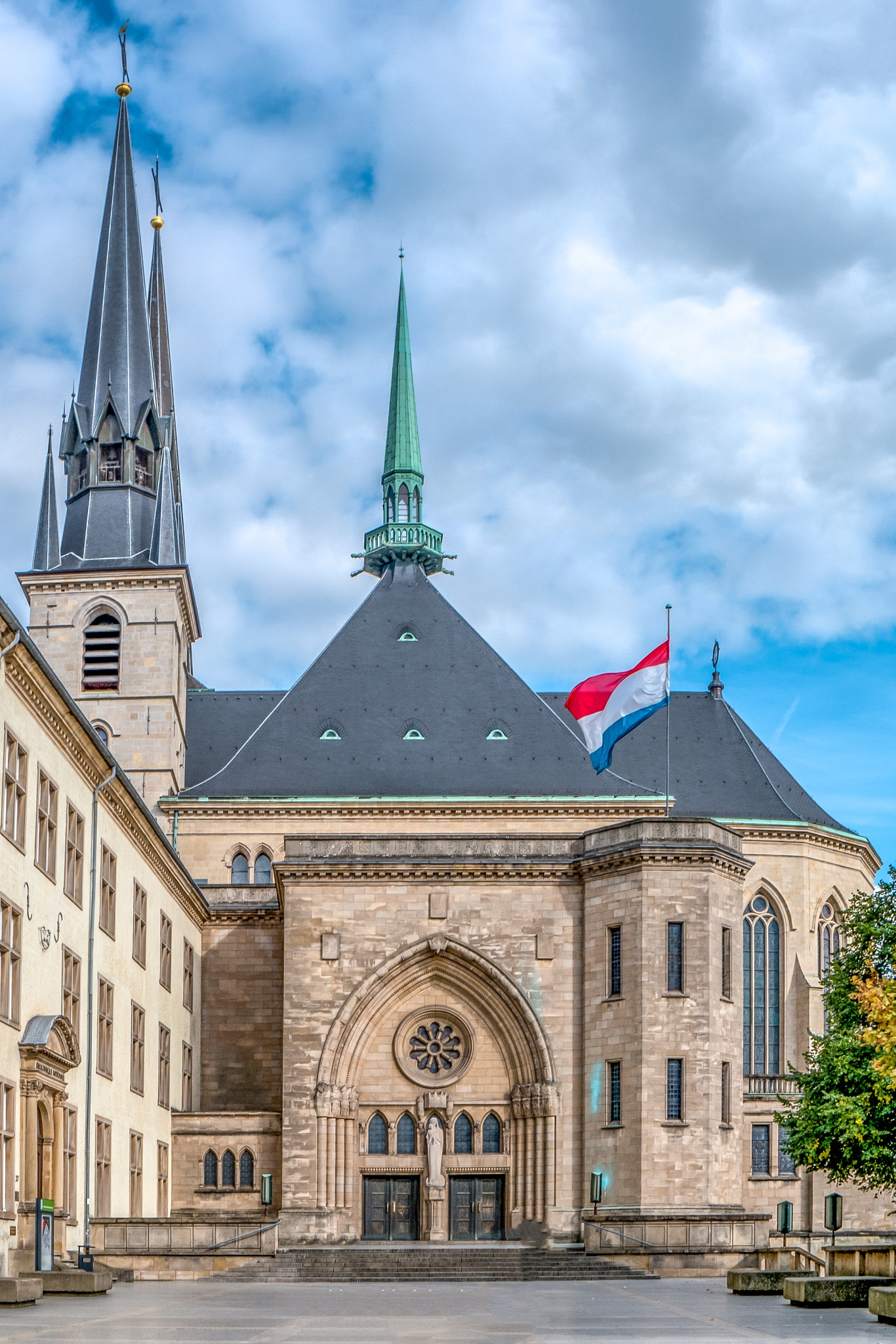
- Our Lady of Luxembourg

Religion
- Affiliation: Catholic Church
- Province: Archdiocese of Luxembourg
- Ecclesiastical or organisational status: Cathedral
- Status: Active

Location
- Location: Luxembourg City, Luxembourg
- Interactive map of Cathedral of Our Lady of Consolation of Luxembourg; Kathedral Notre-Dame; Cathédrale Notre-Dame; Kathedrale unserer lieben Frau
- Coordinates: 49°36′34.8″N 06°07′53.6″E

Architecture
- Type: Church
- Style: Baroque; Gothic
- Groundbreaking: 1613
- Completed: 1938

Notre Dame Cathedral (Luxembourgish: Kathedral Notre Dame, French: Cathédrale Notre-Dame, German: Kathedrale unserer lieben Frau) is the Catholic cathedral of the Archdiocese of Luxembourg, located in Luxembourg City in southern Luxembourg. It was originally a Jesuit church, and its cornerstone was laid in 1613. It is the only cathedral in Luxembourg. The church is an example of late Gothic architecture; however, it also has many Renaissance elements and adornments.

Pope Pius IX granted a Pontifical decree of coronation towards the Marian image of Our Lady of Consolation (Latin: Sancta Maria Consolatricis Afflictorum), the patron saint of both the city and the nation on 24 June 1866. The rite of coronation was executed by the former Archbishop of Munich, Cardinal Karl-August von Reisach on 2 July 1866. Fifty years later, the church was consecrated as the Church of Our Lady and in 1870, it was elevated to the Cathedral of Notre-Dame.

At the cemetery of the cathedral is the National Monument to the Resistance and to the Deportation. The centerpiece of the monument is the famous bronze monument by the 20th-century Luxembourgish sculptor Lucien Wercollier called The Political Prisoner. The cathedral was expanded and enlarged from 1935 to 1938.

== History ==
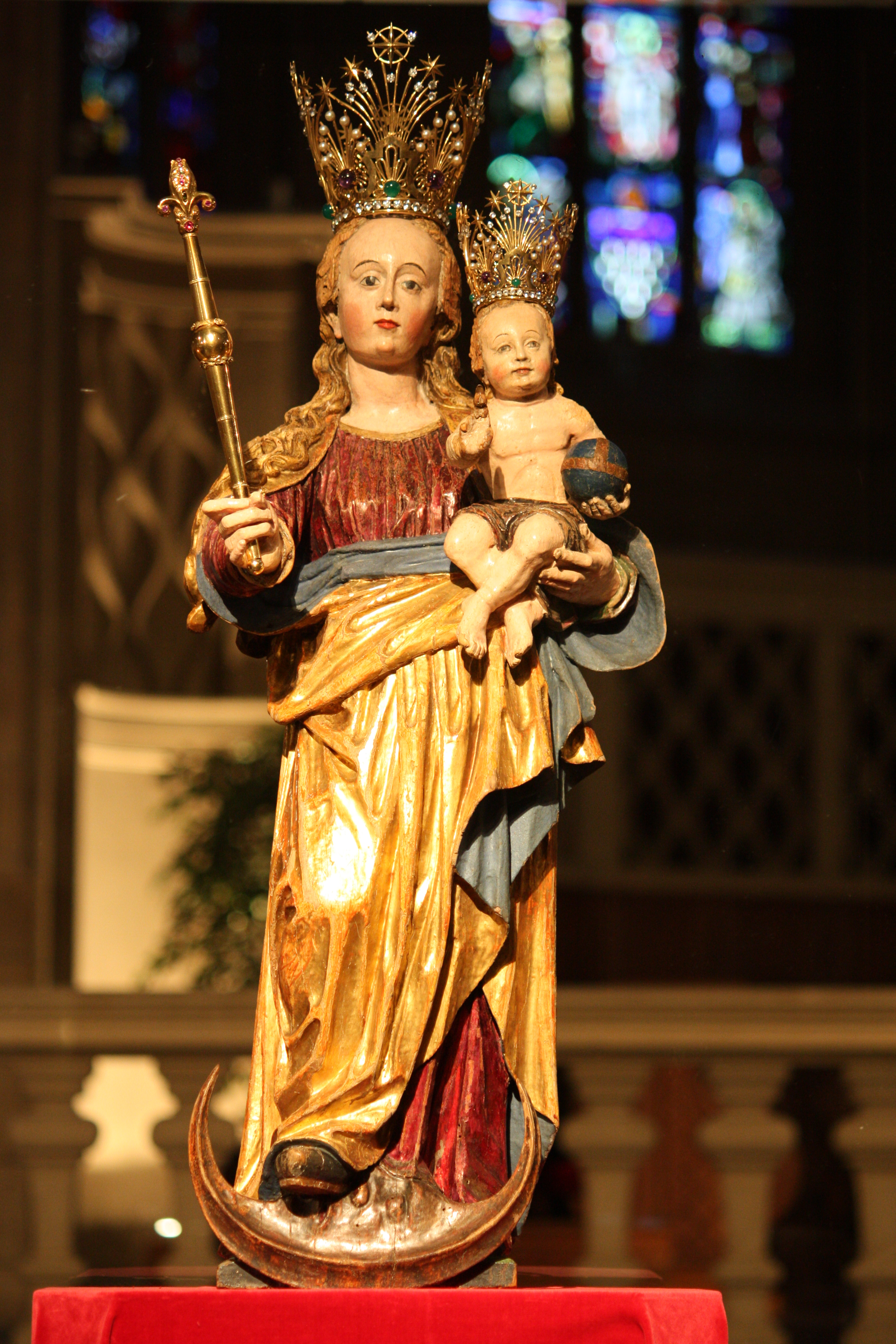
Our Lady of Luxembourg crowned by the decree of Pope Pius IX in 1866.

Jesuit priests from Belgium, which like Luxembourg belonged to the Spanish Netherlands at the time, opened a college in Luxembourg city in 1603, where the majority of young Luxembourgers were taught until 1773. The first stone of the church was laid on 7 May 1613, under Father François Aldenard. The constructor of the building was Ulrich Job, from Lucerne. Under him, the decoration of the columns also took place. The Jesuit church was consecrated and dedicated to the Immaculate Conception on 17 October 1621 by auxiliary bishop Georg von Helfenstein.

Artistically, it was above all the German sculptor Daniel Muller (died 1623) from Freiberg (Saxony) who contributed to the appearance of the church, his work including the organ tribune. The decorations in alabaster, a favourite material of Dutch Renaissance sculptors, represent early Baroque angels, who play music between leaves and floral decorations.

After the Jesuits had left the city in 1773, Empress Maria Theresa of Austria donated the church to the city of Luxembourg in 1778, and it became the new parish church under the name "Saint Nicolas et Sainte Thérèse". This was convenient, as at the time the old parish church, the church of St. Nicholas on the Krautmaart was small and decrepit, and was demolished in 1779. For this reason, a statue of St. Nicholas stands over the cathedral entrance in Rue Notre-Dame. In 1801 the church was dedicated to Saint Peter.

It received the name "Notre-Dame" on 31 March 1848 under the apostolic vicar Jean-Théodore Laurent. His successor, Nicolas Adames, had the Baroque interior refurbished from 1854 in a neo-Gothic style. When Luxembourg was elevated to a bishopric by Pope Pius IX on 27 June 1870, the Notre-Dame Church became Notre-Dame Cathedral.

== Architecture ==
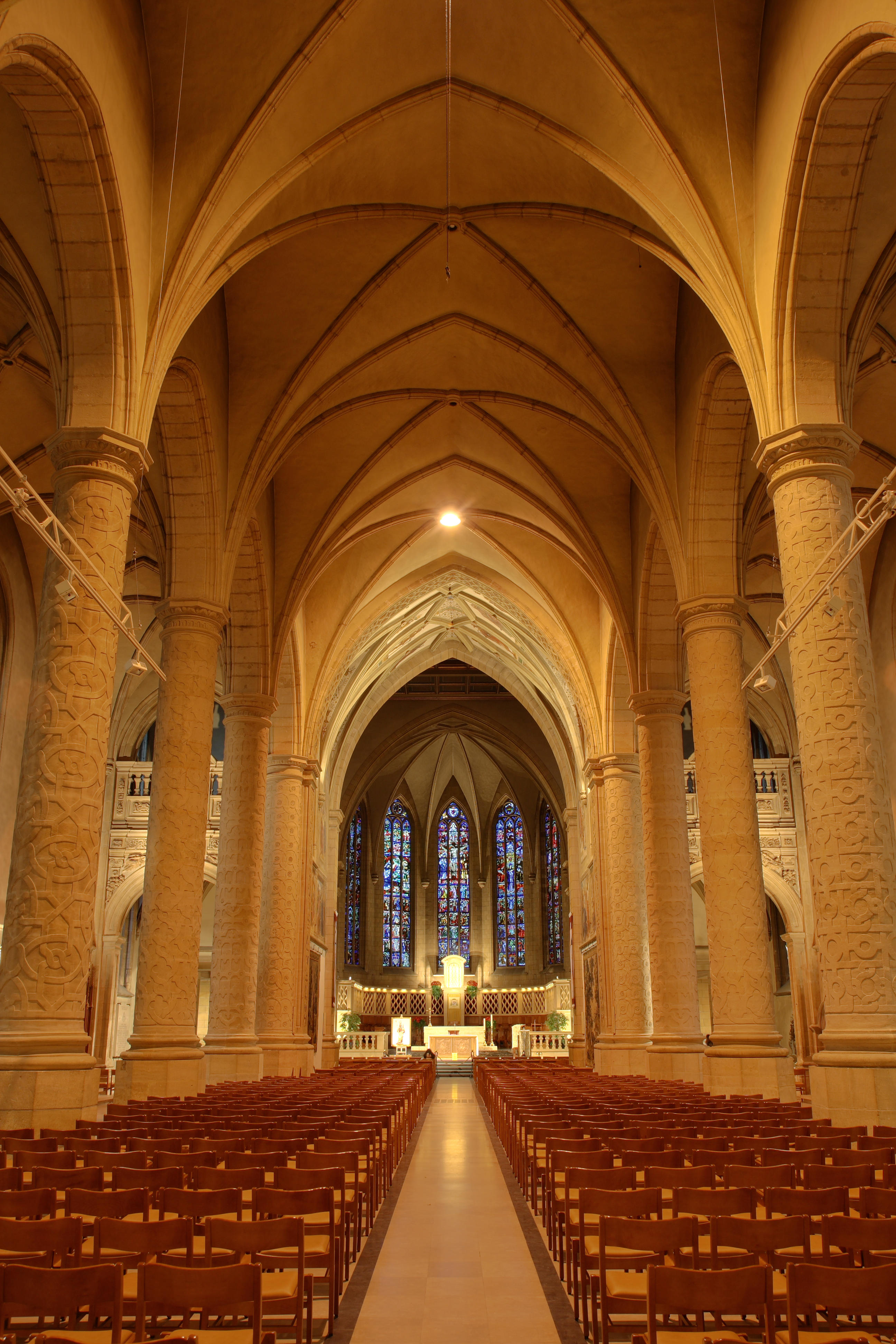
Nave of the cathedral

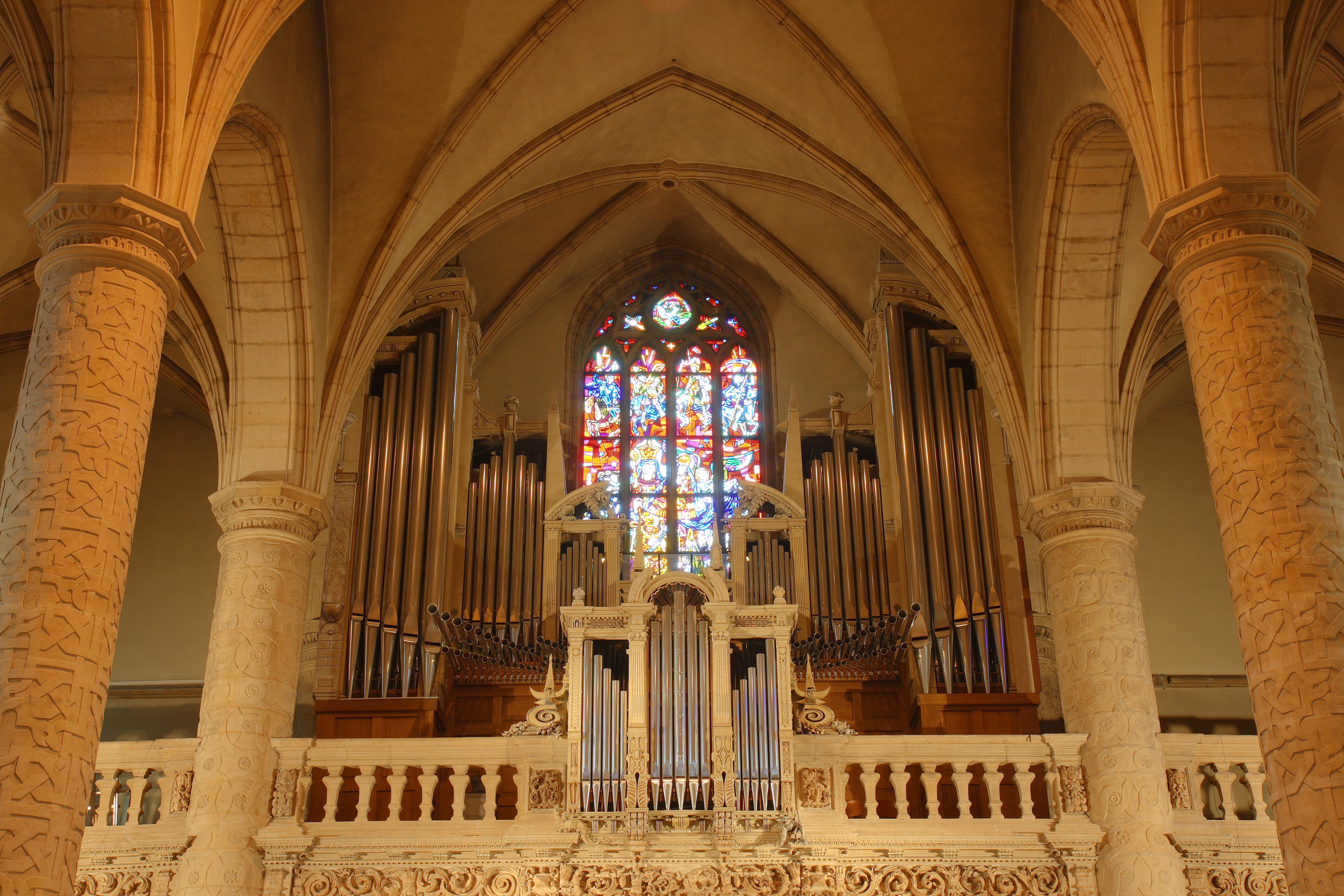
Organ gallery and stained glass

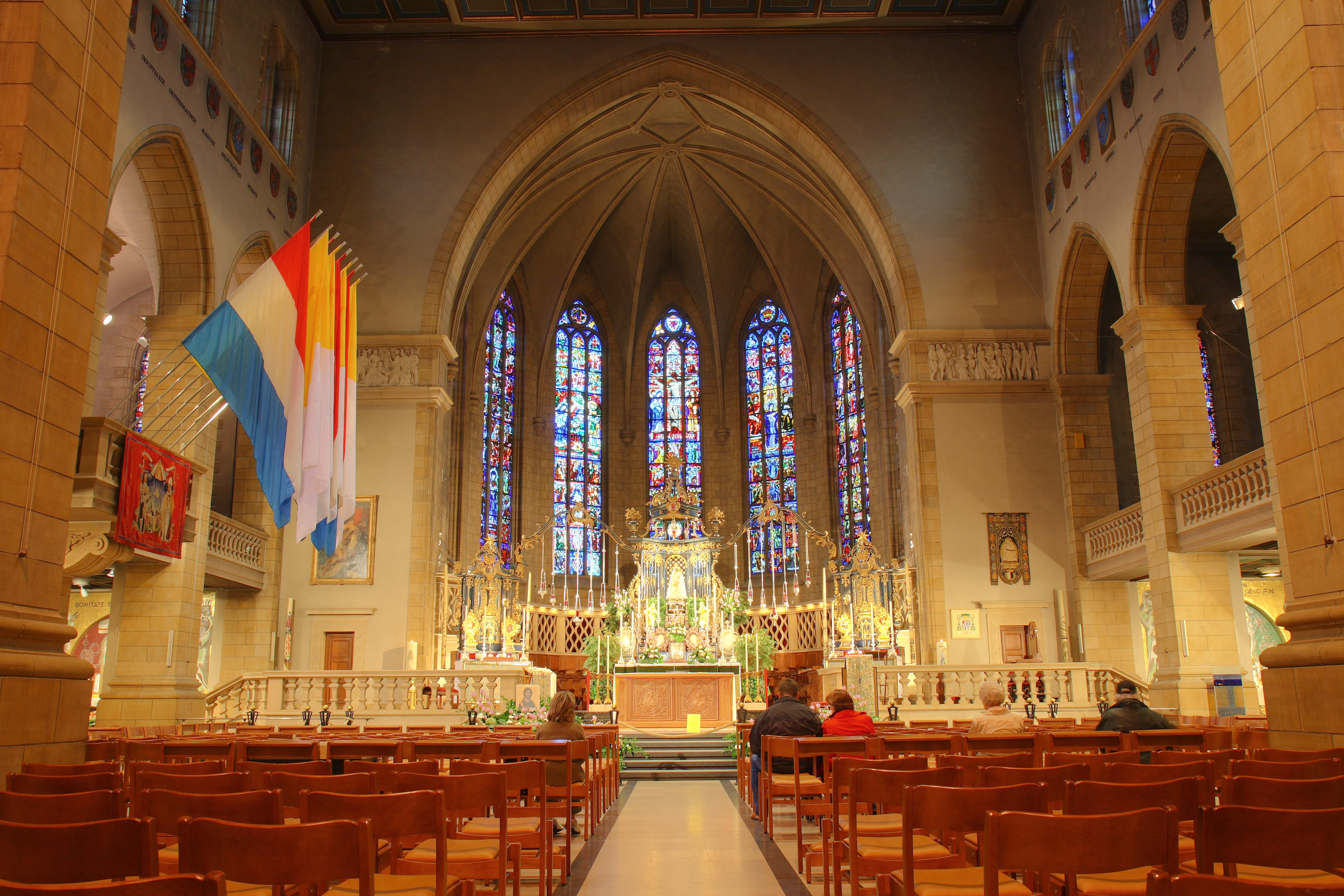
The cathedral quire

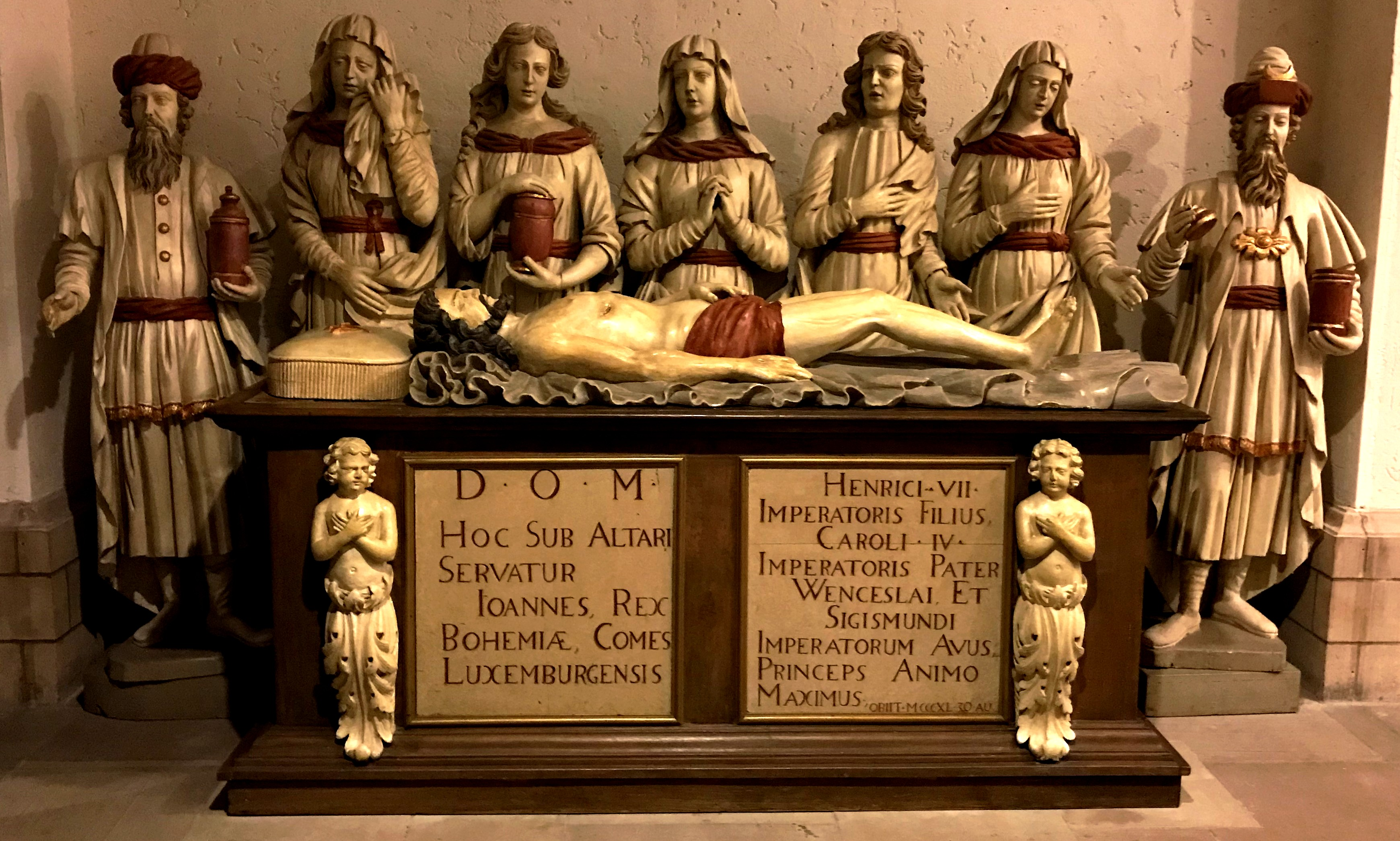
Tomb of John of Bohemia

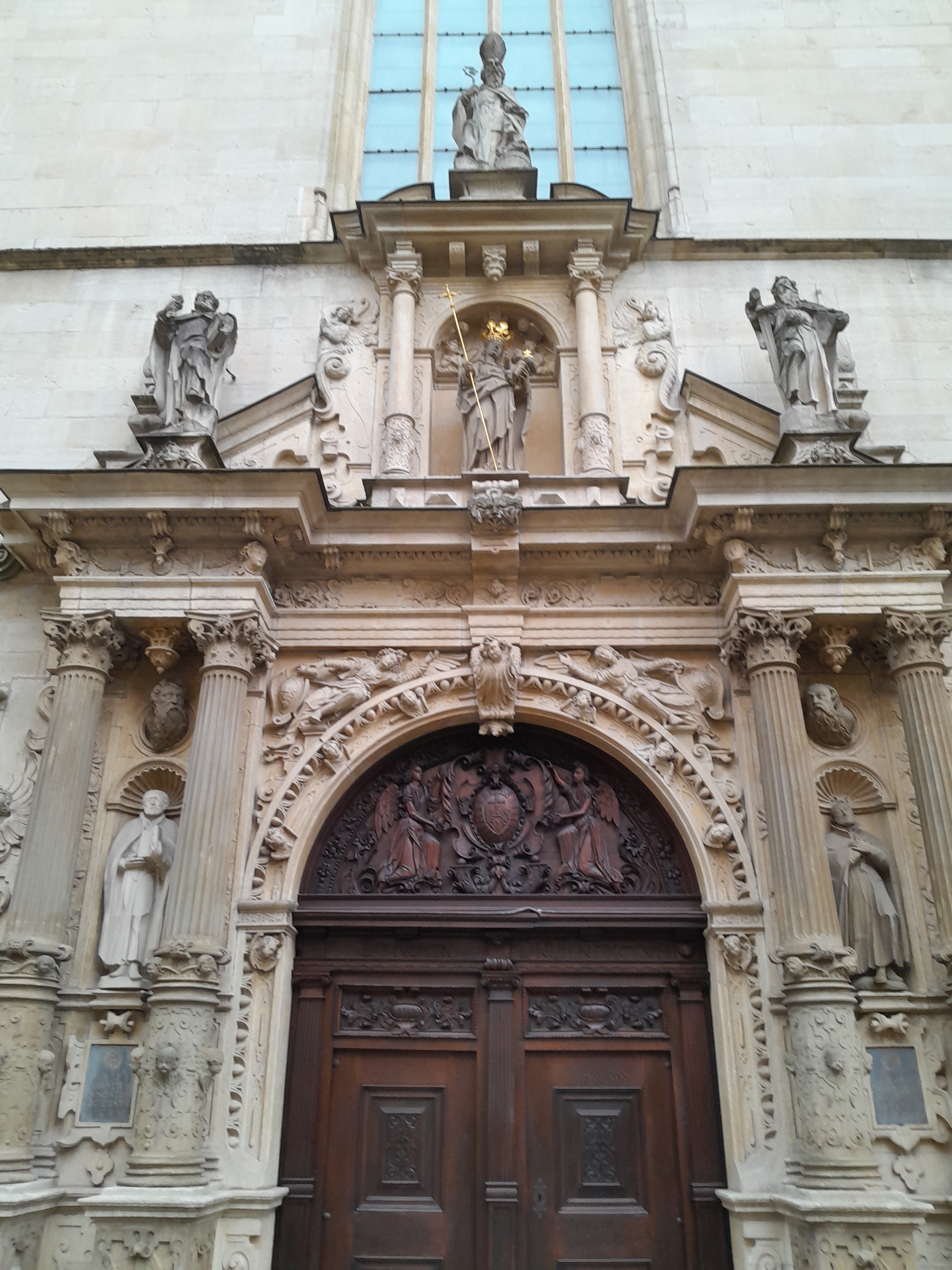
One of church lintels

Though a noteworthy example of late Gothic architecture, the cathedral has many Renaissance elements and adornments.

=== 20th century enlargement ===
From 1935 to 1938 the cathedral was enlarged and expanded. This enlargement, which influenced the silhouette of the fortress city of Luxembourg, went ahead according to plans by and under the supervision of the Luxembourgish architect Hubert Schumacher. The expanded area, which connects to the two choir bays of 1613–1621, characterises the image of the former Jesuit church both due to its spaciousness and through the architectural unity. The rebuilding of the exterior architecture on the Gothic-style cathedral presented a challenge, since the goal was to harmoniously integrate the church with the surrounding buildings, such as the former Athénée building from the 17th century, the national library, the old church of St. Maximin (1751) (now the Foreign Ministry), as well as the old residential houses.

=== Towers ===
The cathedral has three towers: the west tower, which was the tower of the Jesuit church and which contains the bells, the east tower, and the central tower, which stands over the transept.

When the cathedral was enlarged in 1935–1938, the east and central towers were added. The central tower, which is only a third of the height of the other towers, consists of a wide, pyramid-shaped base and a narrow peak covered with copper. The roof itself is carried by a steel frame, consisting of two PN20 beams from ARBED-Belval.

On Good Friday, 5 April 1985, around mid-day, work on the roof caused the west tower to catch fire. The church bells, i.e. the Virgin Mary bell, the Willibrord bell, the Peter bell, and the Cunigunde bell, were destroyed in the fire. When the tower collapsed, the roof of the central aisle was also partly damaged. It took until 17 October 1985 for the tower to be repaired.

== Burials in the crypt ==
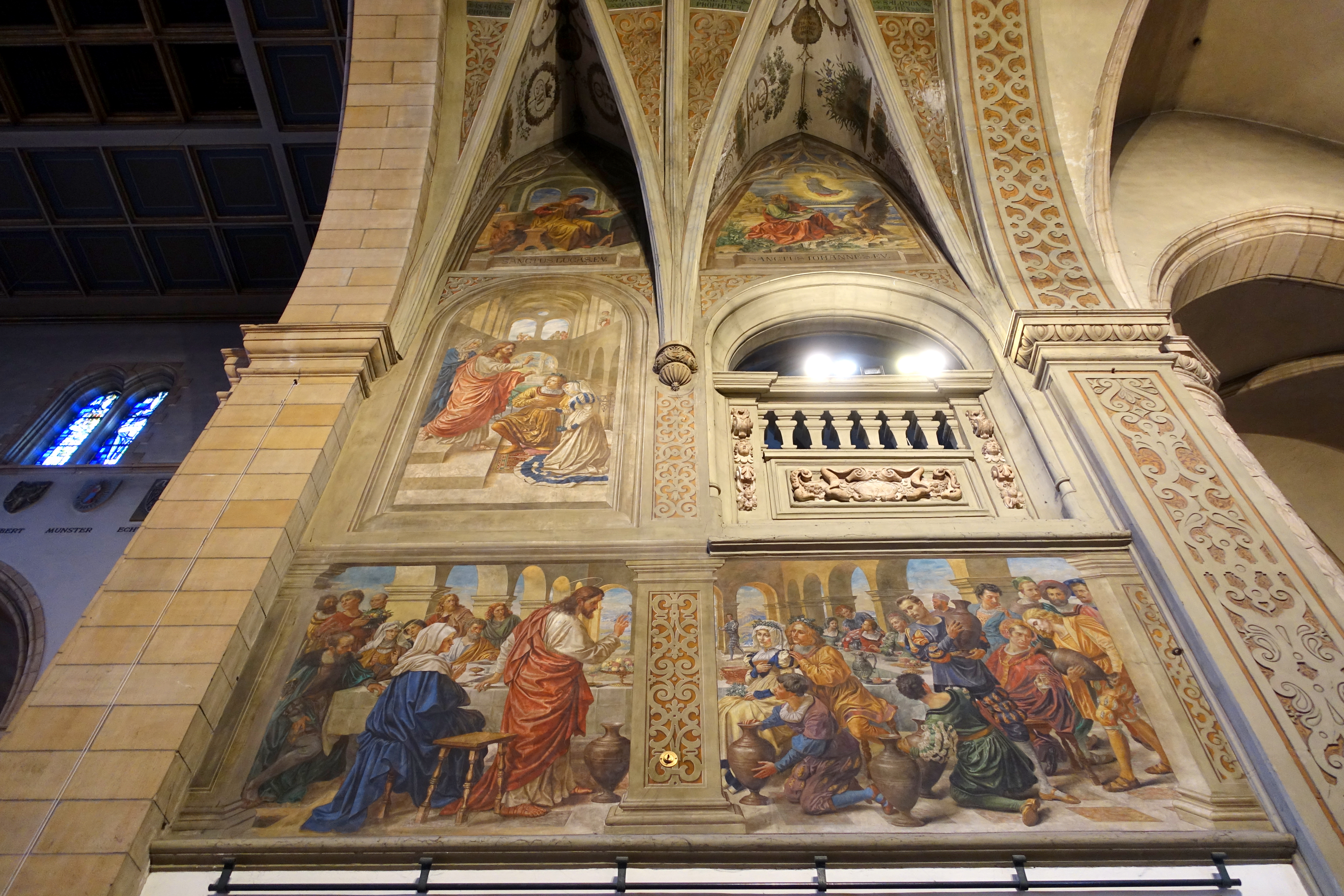
Religious paintings inside the cathedral.

The crypt of the cathedral contains the remains of Grand Dukes and Grand Duchesses of Luxembourg. The following people are interred here:

- John of Bohemia (1296–1346), whose remains were relocated from Germany to the cathedral in 1945
- Marie-Adélaïde, Grand Duchess of Luxembourg (1894–1924)
- Marie Anne, Grand Duchess of Luxembourg, born Infanta of Portugal (1861–1942) – Consort of William IV, Regent of Luxembourg (1908–1912)
- Felix, Prince Consort of Luxembourg, born Prince of Bourbon-Parma (1893–1970) – Consort of Charlotte I
- Prince Charles (1927–1977)
- Charlotte, Grand Duchess of Luxembourg (1896–1985)
- Joséphine Charlotte, Grand Duchess of Luxembourg, born Princess of Belgium (1927–2005) – Consort of Jean I
- Jean, Grand Duke of Luxembourg (1921–2019)

== See also ==
- Roman Catholic Marian churches
- List of Archbishops of Luxembourg
- List of Jesuit sites
