= Theodore van der Noot, 8th Marquess of Assche =

Belgian courtier and aristocrat (1818–1889)

Theodore Charles Antoine van der Noot, 8th Marquess of Assche and 6th Count van der Noot (14 July 1818 – 13 August 1889) was a Belgian courtier and aristocrat.

== Career ==
During the Holland period the Marquess of Assche was Lord-Chamberlain to William III of the Netherlands.

== Family ==
He was the eldest son of Maximilien Louis van der Noot, 7th Marquess of Assche and his second wife Adelaïde Countess d'Yve de Bavay (1792–1879). His sister Charlotte, countess van der Noot was married to Count de Lannoy, Lord Marshall to the Duke of Brabant.

Theodore married in Brussels on 14 June 1856 to the Russian Catherine Bernardaki (1825–1905), she was the widow of Gotthard Alexander Konstantin von Benckendorff. they had 4 children. He was succeeded by Edouard Dimitri van der Noot, 9th Marquess of Assche. His granddaughter was Countess Elisabeth van der Noot d'Assche.

=== Children ===
- Eduard Dimitri x Adrienne Barbanson.
- Henri Carlo Eduard Adrien Theodore x Colette Allard.
- Alfred

== Wealth ==
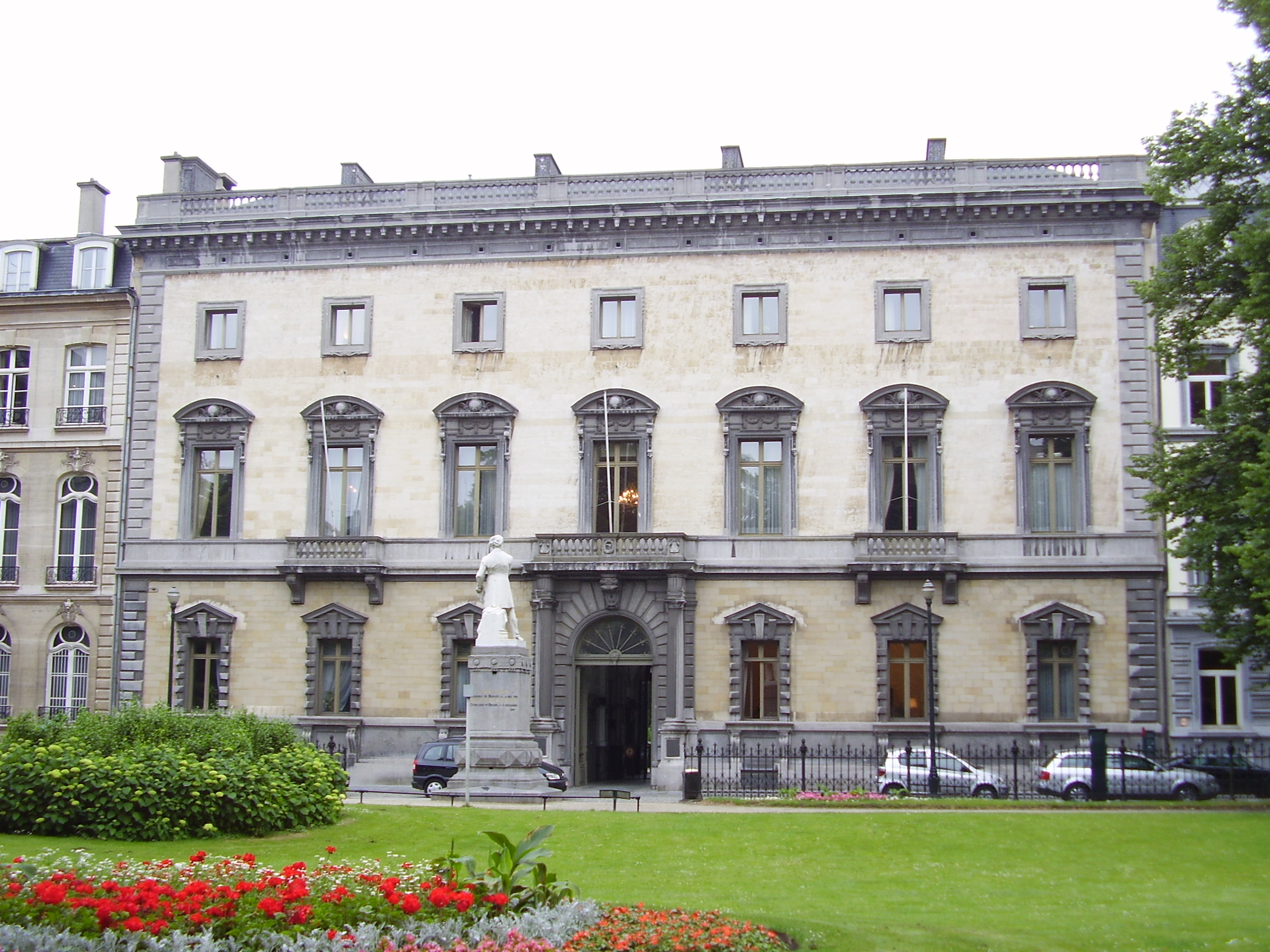
The Hôtel van der Noot d'Assche accommodates the Council of State.

Most members of the van der Noot-family had important functions at court and close contacts with the royal family. His wealth was impressive, between 1856 and 1858 he had a new palace built in Brussels by the architect Alphonse Balat. After second world war the Hôtel van der Noot d'Assche was sold to the Belgian state.

Another residence was the estate of the Chateau des Amerois, sold to Prince Philippe, Count of Flanders, who had the castle built by Gustave Saintenoy.
