= Count van der Noot =

Belgian Noble family

The Van der Noot family is a Belgian noble family. The title of Count van der Noot is a title created by Emperor Charles VI on 16 May 1716. Since then this title belongs to the Belgian nobility.

They are the current holders of the Marquess of Assche title.

== History ==
The house of van der Noot is divided in 7 families and branches, the most known is the branch of the Barons of Carloo, Baron of Schoonhoven and Marquess of Assche. The title Count van der Noot was created for Charles Bonventura, 1st Count van der Noot, he was the third son of Roger-Wauthier van der Noot, 1st Baron of Carloo (born 27 February 1644), Mayor of Brussels. His uncle was Philips Erard van der Noot, bishop of Ghent. He was the author of all counts van der Noot, who have lived ever since. His son Jean Antoine made a powerful alliance with Marie Josepha Taye, and his male heirs inherited the title of Marquess of Assche. the Since then the title passed from generation to generation in the House of van der Noot. Today all members of the family bear the title count or countess van der Noot, the head of the family is the current Marquess of Assche.

The House had two Bishops of Ghent, the last Princess Abbess of Nivelles (1776-1794) Marie Felicite, and the first Apostolic Vicar of Luxembourg (1833-1842), Johann Theodor (1769-1843).

In 1816 the family obtained the rank of Count van der Noot for all members. Theodore van der Noot, 8th Marquess of Assche had a luxurious palace built by Alphonse Balat in Brussels, today this palace is the seat of the Council of State. Theodore was considered one of the richest noblemen of the kingdom, possessing several estates including the Chateau des Amerois.

Henri van der Noot is a member of this family.

== List of family members ==
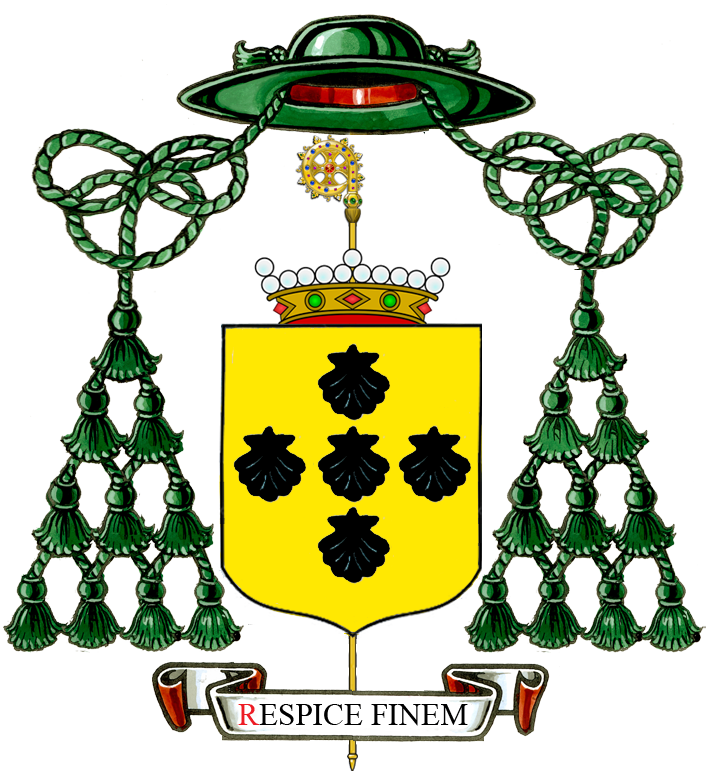
Yellow coat of arms

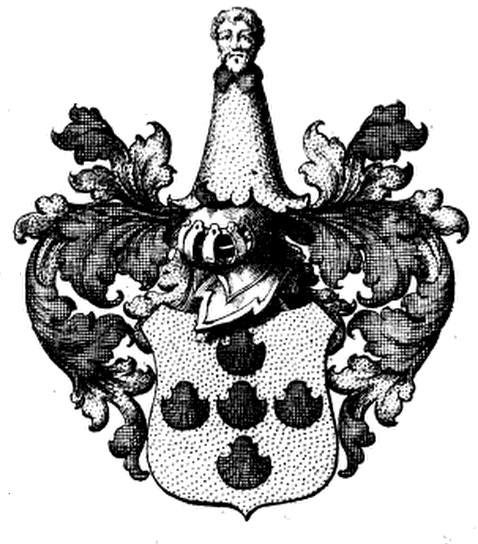
Crest

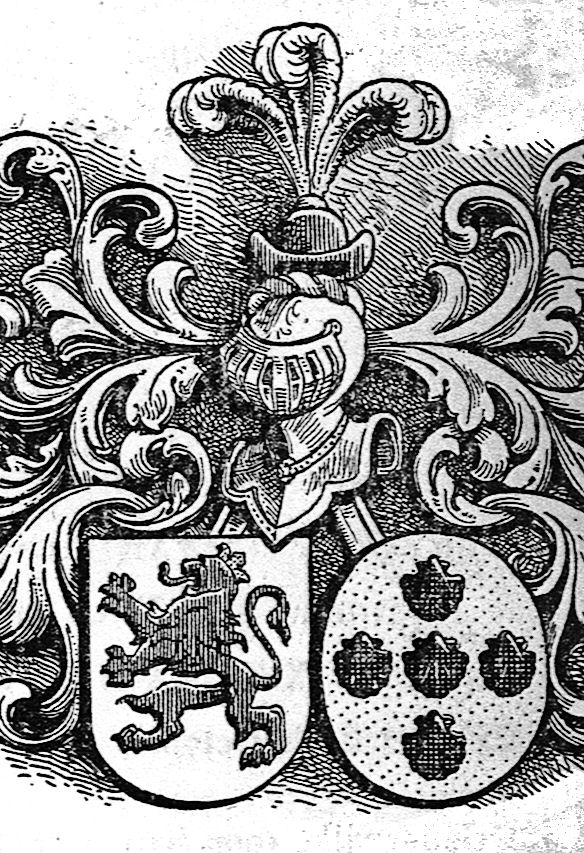
Roger de Baexen, married Françoise vander Noot

- Gilles van der Noot, died 1668: Lord of Carloo, knighted.
  - Philips Erard van der Noot, bishop of Ghent
  - Roger-Wauthier van der Noot, 1st Baron of Carloo:Lord mayor of the City of Brussels. Marr. Anne Louise, Lady of Cortenbach.
    - Philipp François, 2nd Baron of Carloo. Died 1759.
    - Jean Joseph van der Noot: Chief of Teutonic Order – Commandry of Ramersdorf.
    - Charles Bonventura, 1st Count van der Noot
      - Anne-Constance, Countess van der Noot; married to Philippe-Jean d'Arschot-Schoonhoven.
        - Guillaume-Ernest, Count d'Arschot-Schoonhoven
          - Anatole-Charles, Count d'Arschot-Schoonhoven;
            married to Alice, Princess of Looz-Corswarem.
      - Jean Antoine, 2nd Count van der Noot
    - Maximiliaan Antoon van der Noot: Bishop of Ghent.
    - Anna Philipine Theresia van der Noot: Married Lancelot-Ignace, Baron of Gottignies.
  - Anne-Françoise vander Noot de Carloo;
    married to Roger de Baexen, Lord of Thilen.
    - Marguerite-Philippine de Baexen, Lady of Thilen;
      married to Philippe-François de Varick, Lord of Court-Saint-Étienne.

=== Branch of the Marquess of Assche ===
Jean Antoine, 2nd Count van der Noot, married to Marie Josepha Taye, 6th Marquess of Assche, 6th Marquess of Wemmel.

  - Maximilien Louis, 7th Marquess of Assche and Wemmel, 3rd Count van der Noot married :
    1st to Albertine Joséphine Claire de Roose (only daughter Josephine married to Gustave-Ferdinand de Lannoy (1800–1892))
    2nd to Adelaïde, Countess d'Yve de Bavay (1792–1879)
    - Theodore van der Noot, 8th Marquess of Assche and Wemmel
      - Eduard Dimitri (1860–1928). Count van der Noot, 9th Marquess of Assche and Wemmel in 1889.
        - Elisabeth van der Noot d'Assche (1899–1974)
          - Marcantonio Ruspoli, 3rd Prince of Poggio Suasa
            - Costantino Ruspoli, 4th Prince of Poggio Suasa
        - Henri I Carlo Eduard Adrien Théodore (1902–1952). Count van de Noot, 10th Marquess of Assche in 1928, married Collette Allard, daughter of Baron Josse Allard.
          - Wauthier Antoine Constantin Eduard van der Noot, 11th Marquess of Assche, married Barbara Devis.
            - Henri II Christian Antoine Alexandre, 12th Marquess of Assche in 1994.
