= Biblioteca Civica Gambalunga =

Library in Rimini, Italy

Coordinates: 44.0614°N 12.5677°E

Gambalunga Civic Library
- Biblioteca Civica Gambalunga
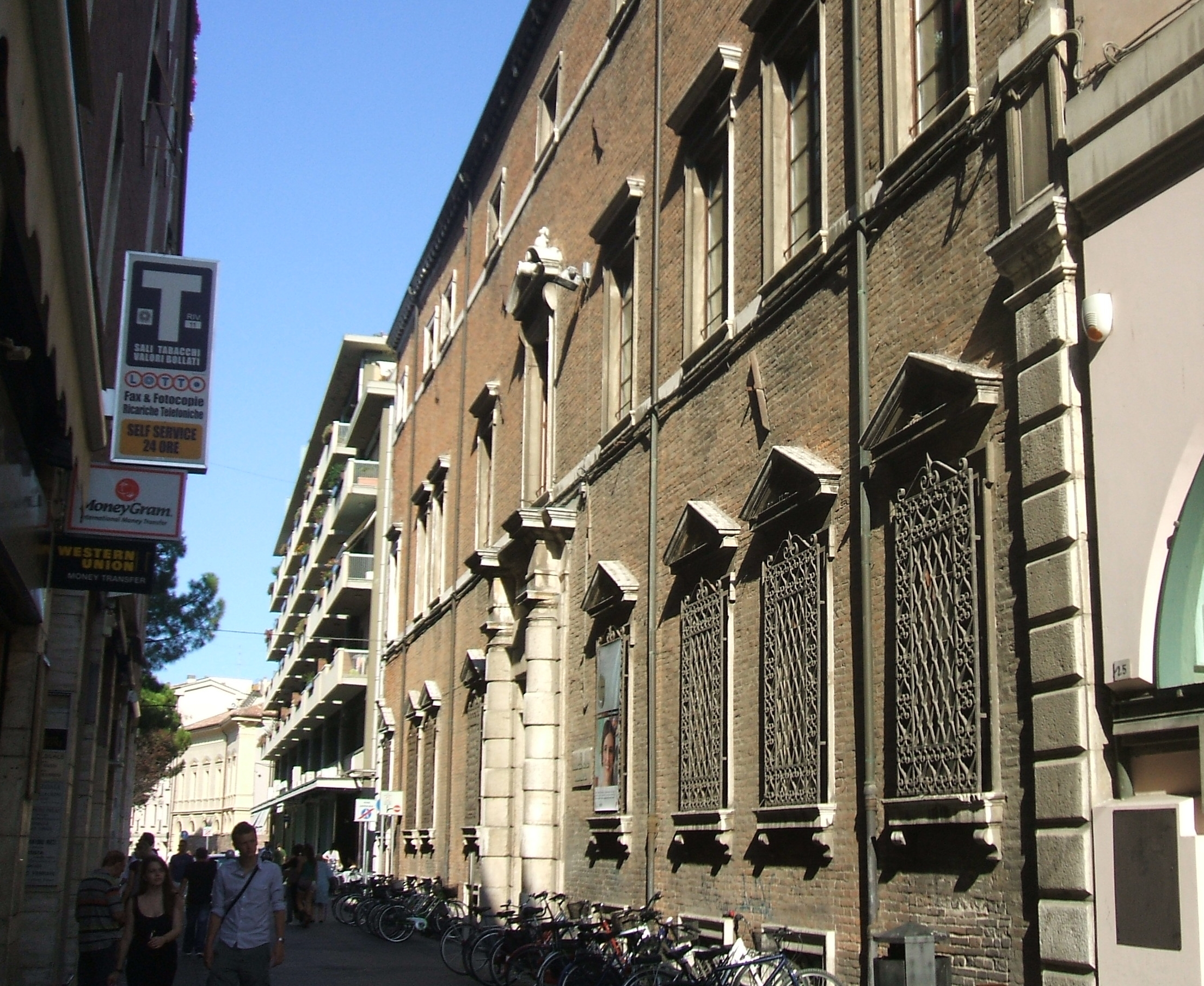
- Façade of the Palazzo Gambalunga, January 2015
- Location: Rimini, Emilia-Romagna, Italy
- Type: Public library
- Established: 1619; 407 years ago

Collection
- Items collected: Books, periodicals, engravings, drawings, prints, photographs, music scores, CD-ROMs, audiocassettes, media
- Size: >300,000 physical exhibits: 293,879 books; 6,000 prints; 2,400 periodicals; >1 million photographs

Other information
- Director: Nadia Bizzocchi (since 2022)
- Parent organisation: SBN Romagna
- Website: bibliotecagambalunga.it

The Biblioteca Civica Gambalunga, also known as the Gambalunghiana, is a public library in Rimini, in the region of Emilia-Romagna, northern Italy.

The library was founded in 1619 following a bequest by Riminese lawyer Alessandro Gambalunga. As of December 2023, the Gambalunghiana's collection holds over 300,000 physical exhibits, including 293,879 books. Readers known to have visited the library include Ezra Pound, Ambroise Firmin Didot, and Aby Warburg.

== History ==
=== Foundation ===
The Palazzo Gambalunga, as the building housing the library is known, was commissioned by Alessandro Gambalunga, a Riminese lawyer. It was constructed between 1610 and 1614 at the cost of 70,000 scudi. The road, then named Via del Rigagnolo della Fontana, was already inhabited by nobles.

The library was purchased mostly in Venice, and transported by sea to Rimini, where the books featuring Gambalunga's distinctive binding were bound in a workshop. Gambalunga predominantly stocked humanistic titles, with law books accompanied by Greek and Latin classics, and works in history, early modern science, Italian literature, grammar, poetry, and rhetoric. They were placed in the lower room of the house.

Gambalunga died on 12 August 1619. His 1617 will, drawn in Pesaro, bequeathed the library to the city's consuls, to be open "to all the others in the city". The will also provided an annual salary of 50 scudi for a librarian and 300 scudi per year to restore and expand the collection. A codicil written three days before his death added the Palazzo Gambalunga to the bequest and nominated Michele Moretti as the first librarian. The inventory of the library was drawn up by notary Mario Bentivegni between 3 September and 17 November 1620, and was found to include 1,438 volumes and just under 2,000 works. The library was relocated to the ground floor.

The Gambalunghiana's foundation is unusual among libraries of its era, being founded by a lay person rather than by a cardinal. It had no comparable local precedents.

=== Later years ===
By 1715, the library's collection had increased to 7,487 books. During the eighteenth century, Giuseppe Garampi, Prefect of the Vatican Archives, was a notable donor to the library. He frequented the library as a sixteen-year-old boy, and in later life, he deposited many incunables and codices, including a De Civitate Dei written for the Malatestas. He bequeathed the library 27 incunables upon his death in 1792, including a first edition of Roberto Valturio's De re militari and 86 codices. Local historians consider Garampi's contribution to the Gambalunghiana as crucial to Rimini's renewal, led by his teacher, Giovanni Bianchi, as a cultural centre rather than isolated provincial town.

With the foundation of the Cisalpine Republic in 1797, the library inherited over 5,000 volumes from suppressed religious orders. In November 1800, a municipal ginnasio was established in the Palazzo Gambalunga, made necessary by the Cisalpine Republic's abolition of schools and seminaries run by the Catholic Church. In 1940, the ginnasio merged with the classical lyceum, moving to its premises on Palazzo Buonadrata on the Corso d'Augusto.

In 1893, the library recorded an annual average of 800 users. By 1932, it numbered 36,946 volumes consulted by 23,418 readers. It was among the few buildings in Rimini's city centre not to be destroyed by the Second World War. The library was renovated in the early 1970s, and returned to the first floor of the Palazzo Gambalunga. In 1974, the library began its photographic archives. In 1989, it joined the Romagna hub of Italy's National Library Service. In 1990, it numbered 87,633 users.

In April 2019, semiotician Paolo Fabbri donated fifty philosophical works and manuscripts to the library on the occasion of its 400th anniversary.

== Collections and exhibits ==
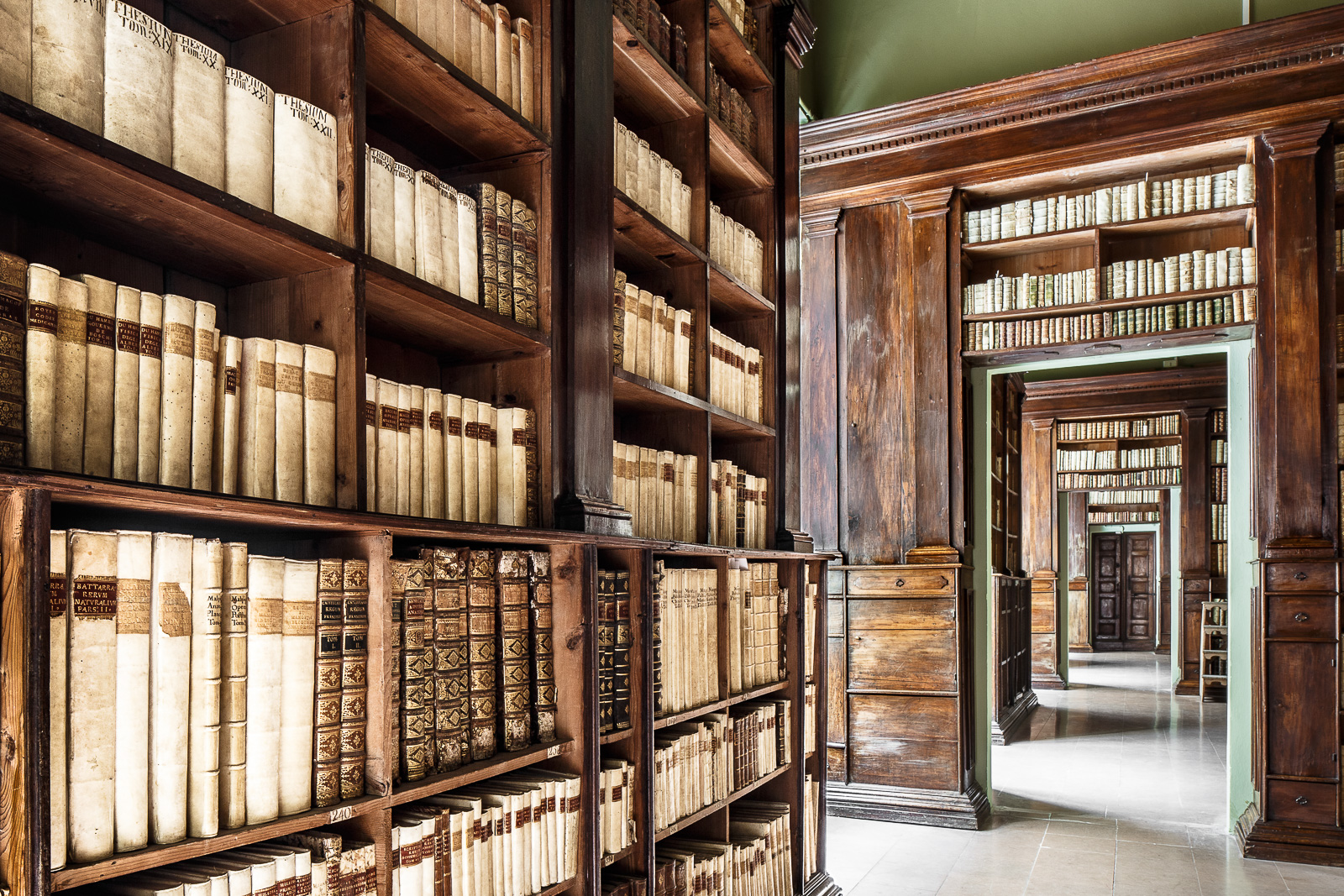
A room in the library, September 2015

As of December 2023, the Gambalunghiana's collection holds 293,879 books, including 60,000 rare books, 384 incunables, 5,000 16th-century books, 1,350 codices, 6,000 prints, and approximately 2,400 periodicals (330 current serials). The library also has 7,144 engravings and drawings.

Among notable exhibits include an 11th-century Evangelarium, an early 12th-century codex of Honorius Augustodunensis, a codex by Hugh of Saint Victor, and letters from Giovanni Bianchi. A collection from Adolphe Noël des Vergers records the French project for a collection of Latin epigraphy and other 19th-century archaeological ventures; the collection is housed in the Sala des Vergers, which was purpose-built in 1938. Other notable collections derive from the librarian Luigi Tonini and his son and successor, Carlo, and several families and photographers. The library also hosts local publications and other exhibits relevant to the history of Rimini; its earliest gazette is dated 10 August 1660.

The Gambalunghiana includes a film collection on its ground floor, and also collects music scores, CD-ROMs, and audiocassettes. Its collection numbers 16,605 books and audiovisuals from the Cineteca Nazionale, and over a million photographic images.

== Architecture ==
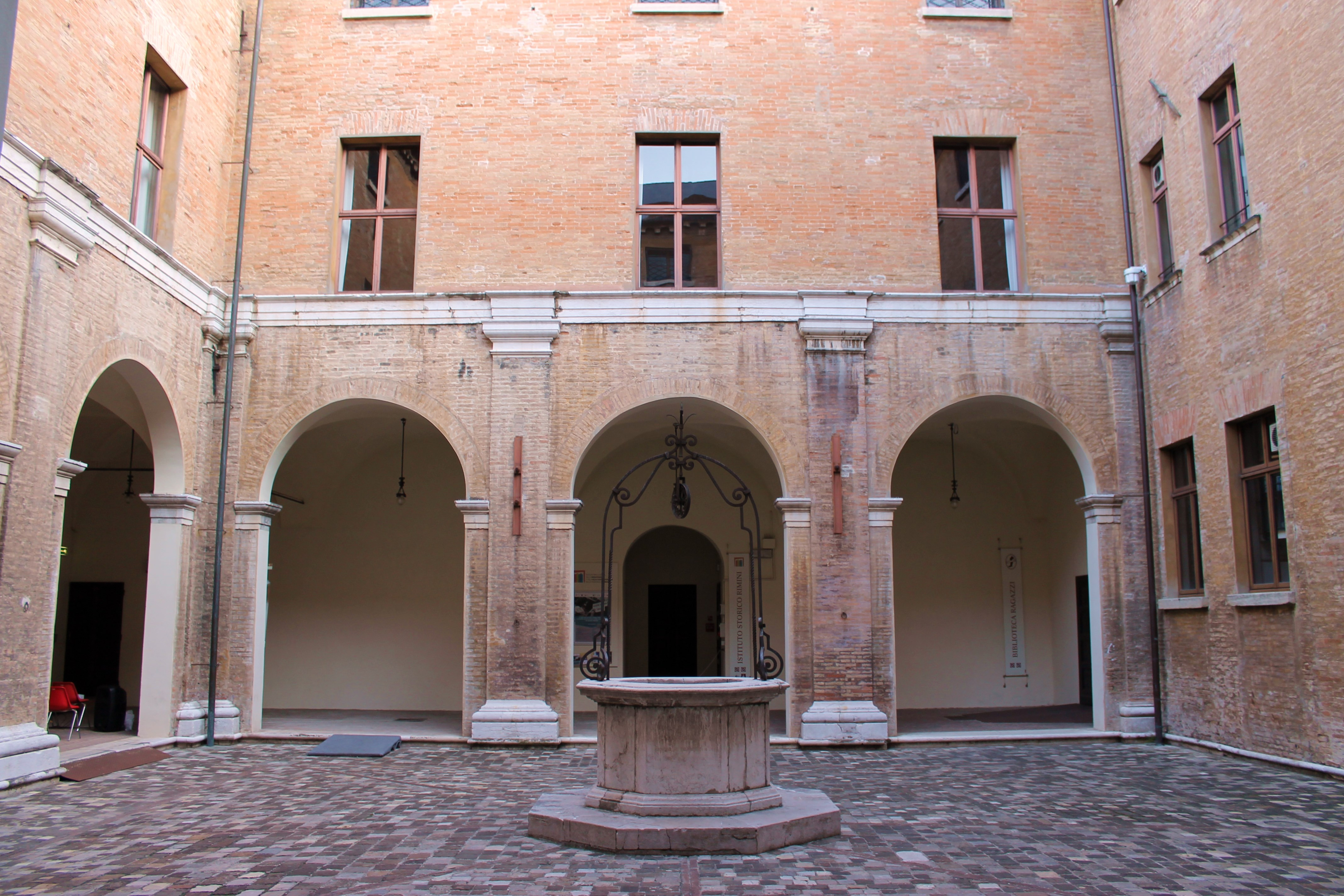
The inner courtyard, September 2018

The Palazzo Gambalunga is Renaissance in its architectural style, influenced by Sebastiano Serlio and Giacomo Barozzi da Vignola. It is centred on an inner courtyard, which since 1928 has featured an eighteenth-century well of Istrian stone.

The ground floor includes the library's film collection, an exhibition space, and the children's library. It initially housed the building's stables, workshops, garages and warehouses, and the library was moved to the three rooms on the ground floor after Gambalunga's death.

After the 1970s renovations, the library returned to the first floor, which originally housed the apartments of Gambalunga and his wife, Raffaella Diotallevi. Notable among the rooms is a rococo room with two Blaeu globes, dated to 1622 and 1640 in Amsterdam. Of the four oldest rooms, the first three date to the early 17th century, and include walnut shelves installed under Moretti's guardianship. The newer room was furnished in 1756, designed by Giovanni Battista Costa, to accommodate new books.

The top floor housed granaries, servants' quarters, the bookbinding workshop.

== List of librarians and directors ==
- Michele Moretti (1619–49)
- Girolamo Avanzolini (1649–78)
- Malatesta Garuffi (1678–94)
- Giuseppe Simbeni (1694–96)
- Girolamo Soleri (1696–1711)
- Ignazio Vanzi (1711–15)
- Antonio Brancaleone (1715–41)
- Lodovico Bianchelli (1741–48)
- Bernardino Brunelli (1748–67)
- Epifanio Brunelli (1767–96)
- Lorenzo Antonio Drudi (1797–1818)
- Luigi Nardi (1818–37)
- Antonio Bianchi (1837–40)
- Luigi Tonini (1840–74)
- Carlo Tonini (1874–1907)
- Aldo Francesco Massera (1908–1928)
- Carlo Lucchesi (1929–1952)
- Mario Zuffa (1954–1970)
- Piero Meldini (1972–1998)
- Marcello Di Bella (1998–2010)
- Oriana Maroni (?–2021)
- Nadia Bizzocchi (2022–)

== See also ==
- Villa des Vergers – a countryside villa in Rimini from which the Gambalunghiana's des Vergers collection derives
