= Wemmel =

- Municipality
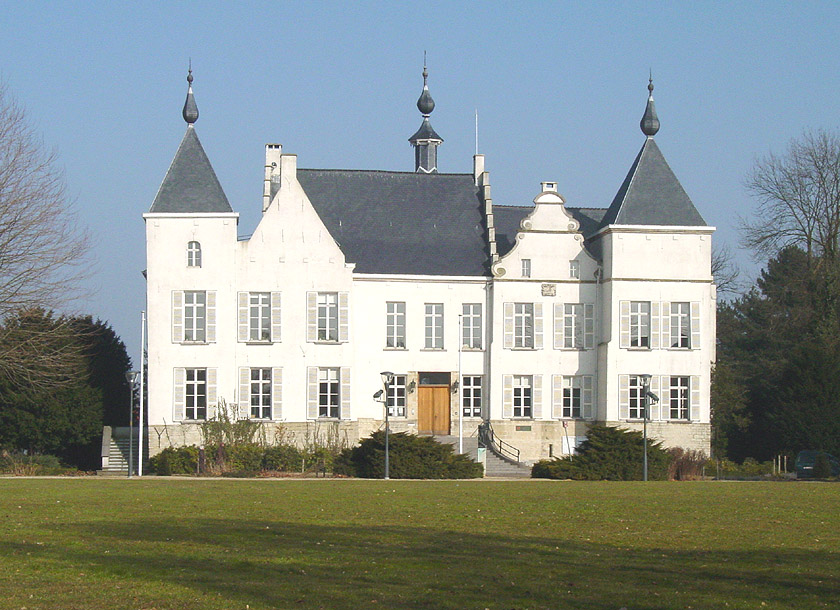
- Wemmel Castle, former residence of the Marquess of Wemmel, now Town Hall.

- Flag Coat of arms

- Location of Wemmel in Flemish Brabant
- Interactive map of Wemmel
- Location in Belgium
- Coordinates: 50°54′28″N 4°18′24″E
- Country: Belgium
- Community: Flemish Community
- Region: Flemish Region
- Province: Flemish Brabant
- Arrondissement: Halle-Vilvoorde

Government
  - Mayor: Walter Vansteenkiste (LB Wemmel)
  - Governing parties: LB Wemmel, Wemmel Plus !

Area
  - Total: 8.77 km^{2} (3.39 sq mi)

Population (2025-01-01)
  - Total: 18,291
  - Density: 2,090/km^{2} (5,400/sq mi)
- Postal codes: 1780
- NIS code: 23102
- Area codes: 02
- Website: www.wemmel.be

Wemmel (Dutch pronunciation: [ˈʋɛməl]; French pronunciation: [wɛmɛl]) is a municipality in the province of Flemish Brabant, in the Flemish region of Belgium. The municipality only comprises the town of Wemmel proper. On January 1, 2018, Wemmel had a total population of 16,347. The total area is 8.74 km^{2} (3.37 sq mi), which gives a population density of 1,870/km^{2} (4,800/sq mi).

The official language of Wemmel is Dutch, as in the rest of Flanders. In 1954, however, special linguistic facilities were given to local French-speakers. Although outside the Brussels-Capital Region, Wemmel is sometimes considered part of the suburbs of Brussels – it directly borders the city municipality of Jette and the neighbourhood of Laeken, and was a component of the short-lived Arrondissement of Brussels-Periphery. The Brussels orbital motorway, known as the ring, cuts through the southern part of the town.

== History ==
The centre of Wemmel initially developed around the Sint-Servaaskerk (Dutch: Church of Saint Servatius), because the ground there was best suited for building. Around the year 370, Frankish invaders drove out the ruling Romans, who had settled the area around the 2nd century AD. Wemmel eventually became part of the Duchy of Brabant.

One of the first lords of Wemmel of which there is a historical record was marshal Goswinus van Wembelne, who lived at the beginning of the 12th century. His descendants would be the lords of Wemmel until the end of the 12th century, when Isabella van Wembelne married Aernout II of Kraainem, and Wemmel became part of the already considerable possessions of Kraainem. Many notable men would come from this noble family, including Aernout III, who would die fighting on the French king's side at the Battle of the Golden Spurs. His son Leo was a skillful diplomat, who would sign the 1366 treaty that resolved a dispute between the County of Flanders and the Duchy of Brabant over the Lordship of Mechelen.

In 1838 all family belongings in Wemmel were sold to count Willem Bernard de Limburg-Stirum, who had become the mayor. Two of his daughters inhabited the castle until 1926. Their heirs then donated the castle to the municipality, since then it has served as the town hall. The castle was entirely renovated in 1992–1993.

== Marquess of Wemmel ==
Leo's granddaughter married Gyselbrecht Taye, the lord of Elewijt, and Wemmel once again came under a different lord, this time belonging to the well known Coudenbergh family from Brussels. This family would govern the heerlijkheid as it was raised in status first to a barony and later to a margravate, only losing power in 1792 as France invaded the Low Countries as part of the French Revolutionary Wars.

Through the marriage between Marie Josepha Taye 6th Marquess of Assche, 3rd Marquess of Wemmel and count Jan-Antoon Van der Noot, the House of vander Noot inherited all the power and castles. Members of his family would play an important role in the Brabantian Revolution.

In 1838, all the ruling family's possessions in Wemmel were sold to William Bernard of Limburg-Stirum, who then became mayor. Two of his daughters would continue to live in Wemmel Castle at the centre of the town until 1926. Their heirs donated the chateau to the municipality, and it has served as the municipality's town hall ever since.

== Language situation ==
The official language is Dutch, as everywhere in Flanders. In 1954, however, special linguistic facilities were given to local French-speakers (according to an official census, they were more than 30% in 1947). They can request official documents from the local administration in French. Since Wemmel is part of the bilingual judicial and electoral district of Brussels-Halle-Vilvoorde, French can be used before the courts. Some primary and maternity schools also teach in French.

== Sights ==
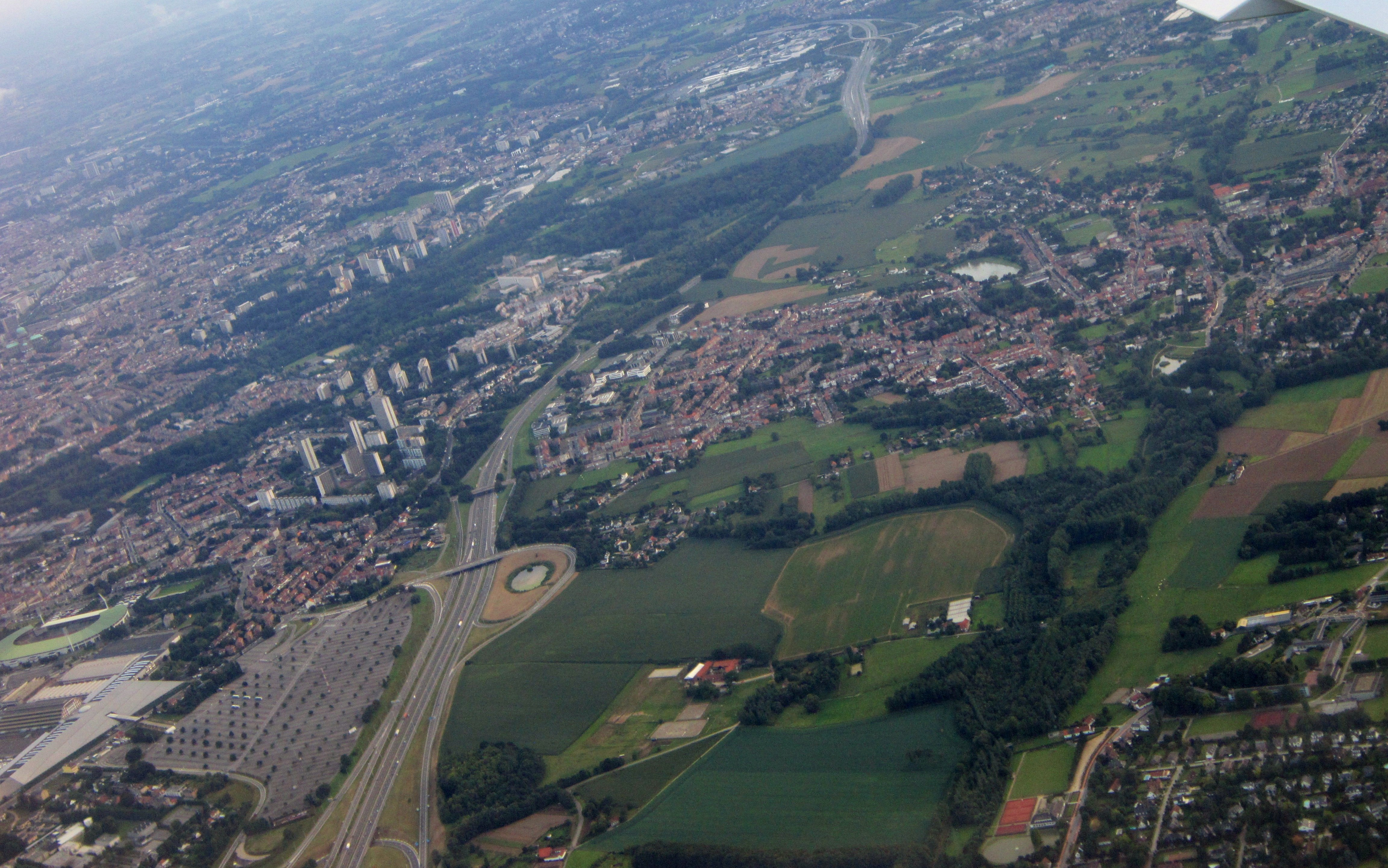
Aerial view

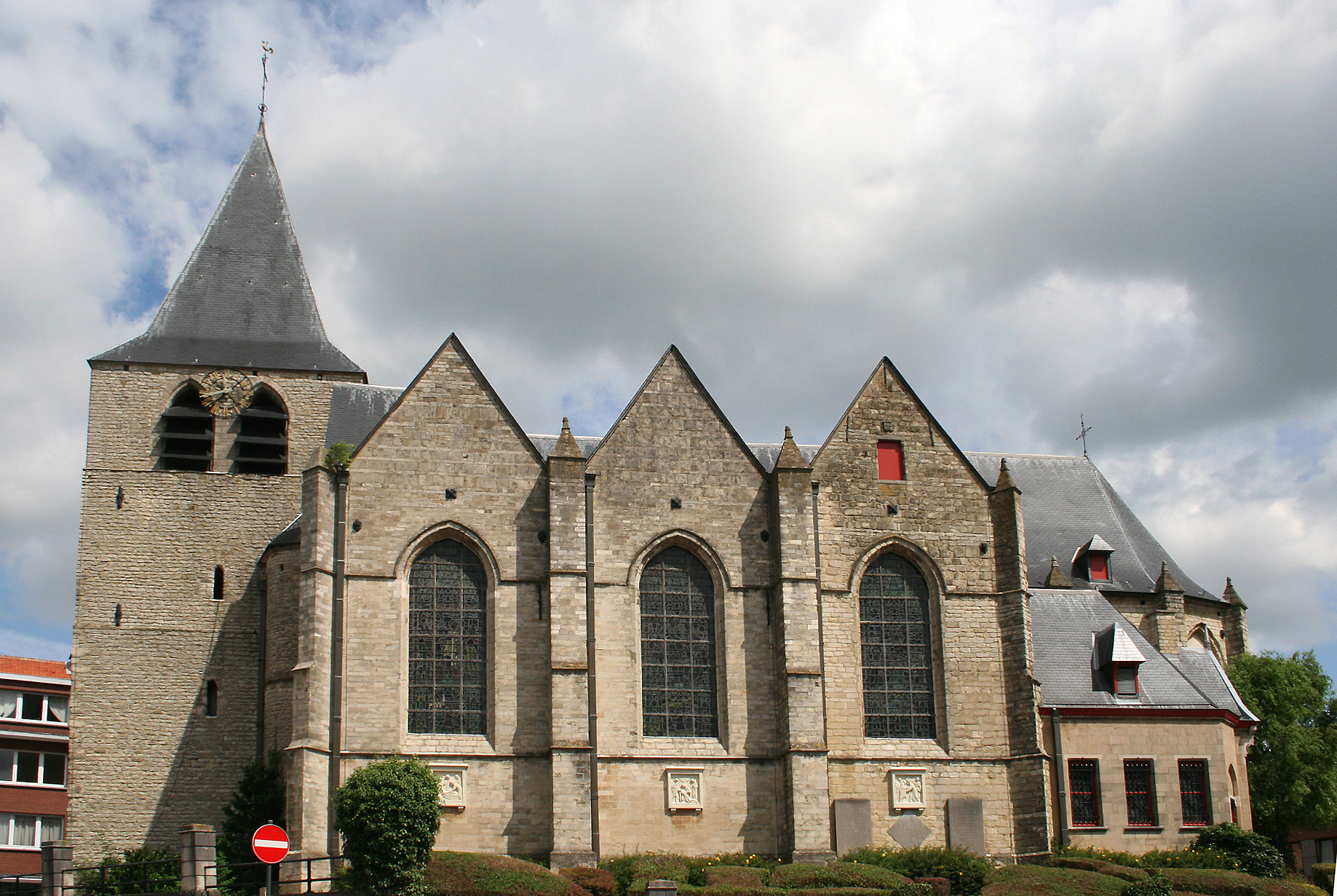
Sint-Servaas Church

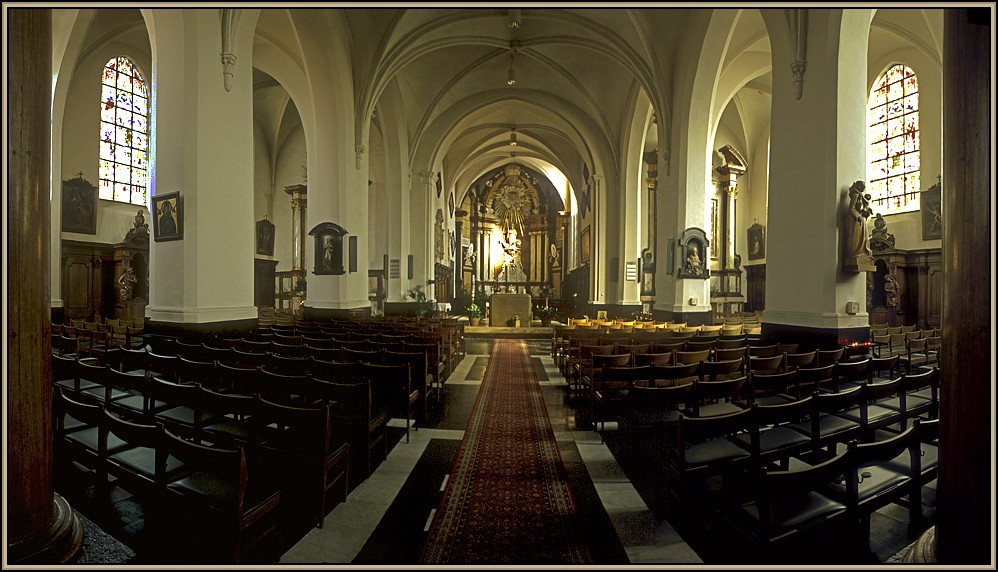
The interior of the church

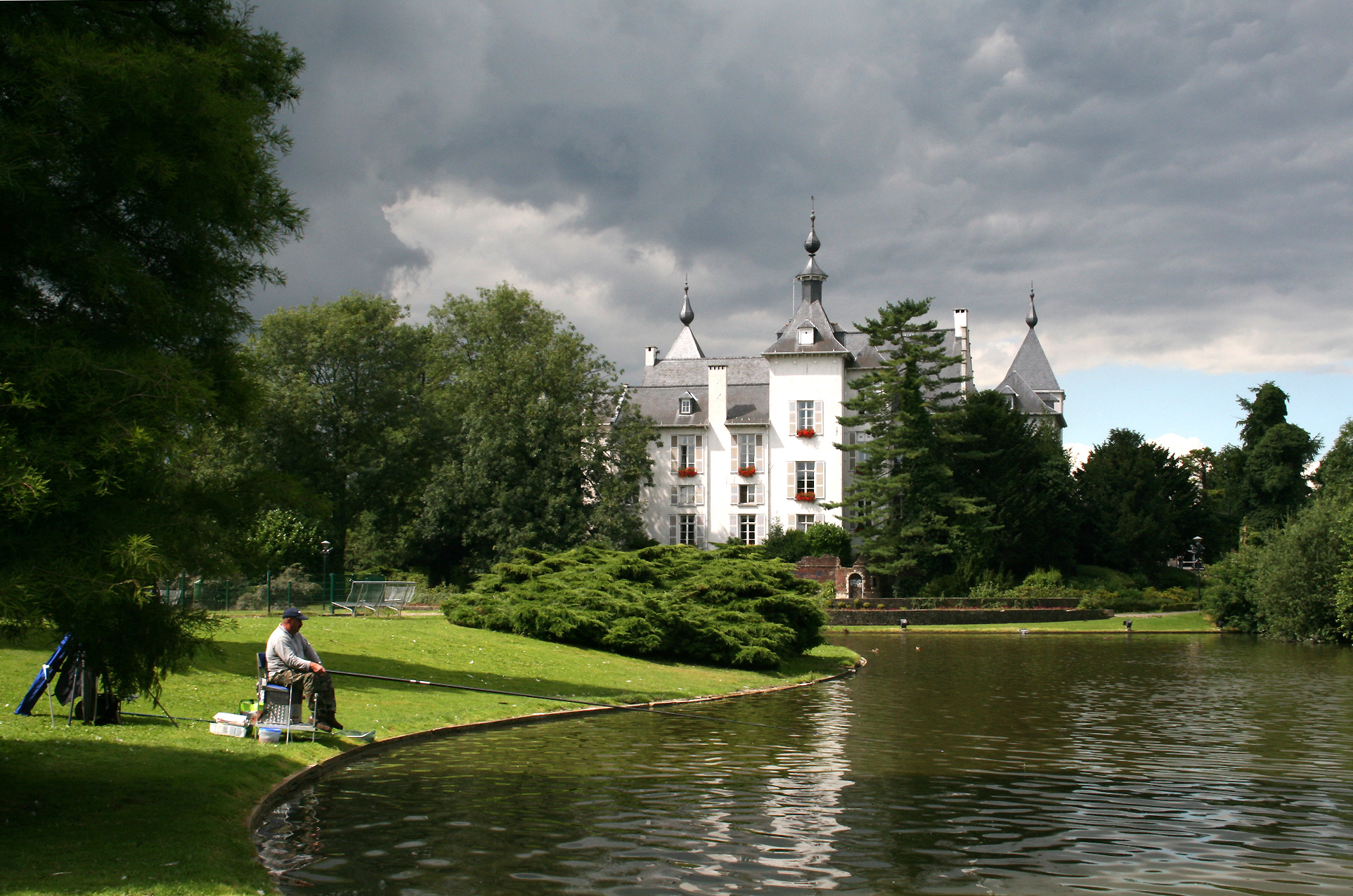
Wemmel Castle and park, today town hall

== See also ==
- Municipalities with linguistic facilities
