= Arthur-Stanislas Diet =

French artist

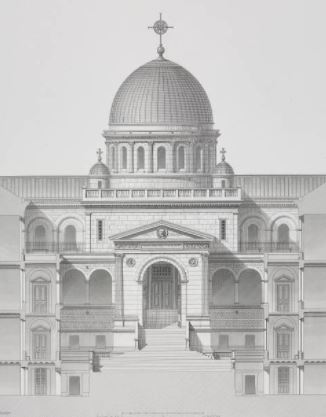
Chapel at the Hôtel-Dieu; Diet and Gilbert

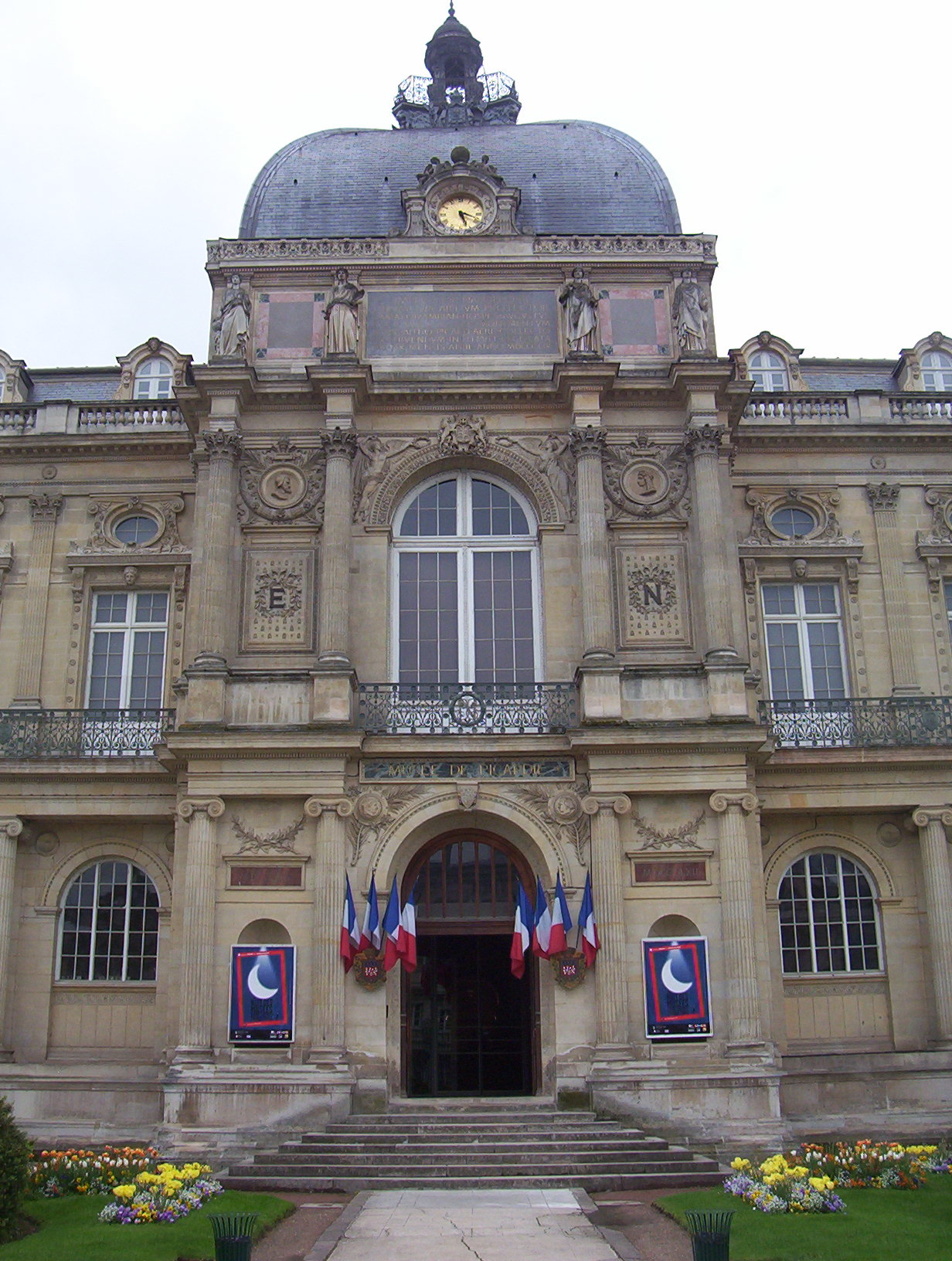
Musée de Picardie; Diet and Parent

Arthur-Stanislas Diet (5 April 1827, Saint-Denis-Hors, near Amboise - 17 January 1890, Paris) was a French architect and watercolorist.

== Life and work ==
He entered the École Nationale Supérieure des Beaux-Arts in 1846, where he studied in the workshop of Félix Duban. In 1853, on his third try, he won the Prix de Rome, with his design for a museum. However, that same year, he married Léonie Maria Gilbert, adopted daughter of the architect Émile Jacques Gilbert, which disqualified him from being a resident at the Académie de France à Rome. Their son, Edmond-Marie (1854-1924), was a composer, who studied with César Franck. Shortly after, he was appointed a government architect, with responsibility for several official buildings in Paris.

From 1862 to 1866, together with Henri Parent, he created designs in the Second Empire style for the new Musée de Picardie in Amiens. As a reward for his contributions, he was named a Knight in the Legion of Honor in 1867. This was followed by assisting his father-in-law, Gilbert, on a work-in-progress: rebuilding the Hôtel-Dieu, which was part of Haussmann's renovation of Paris. This project occupied him until 1878, due in part to the interruptions caused by the Franco-Prussian War, and Gilbert's death in 1874. Work on other health facilities would follow, notably an expansion of the Charenton Asylum (now known as the Esquirol Hospital), originally designed by Gilbert in 1845, and the construction of new buildings at the National Veterinary School of Alfort.

In 1879, Diet redesigned the Villa des Vergers in Rimini, Italy, which was owned by the family of Adolphe Noël des Vergers.

In 1884, he was elected to the Académie des Beaux-Arts, where he took Seat #6 for architecture; succeeding Paul Abadie (deceased). Two years later, he was a recipient of the Ordre des Palmes Académiques.
