= Saintenoy =

Saintenoy is a surname. Notable people with the surname include:

- Gustave Saintenoy (1832–1892), Belgian architect
- Paul Saintenoy (1862–1952), Belgian architect, son of Gustave
