= Mario Ruspoli, 2nd Prince of Poggio Suasa =

Mario Ruspoli

Prince of Poggio Suasa
- Tenure: 1899–1963
- Predecessor: Prince Emanuele Ruspoli
- Successor: Prince Marcantonio Ruspoli
- Born: October 16, 1867; Țigănești, Romania
- Died: January 16, 1963 (aged 95); Florence, Italy
- Spouse: Pauline Marie Palma de Talleyrand-Périgord
- Issue: Prince Costantino Ruspoli; Prince Marescotti Ruspoli; Prince Alessandro Ruspoli; Prince Emanuele Ruspoli; Prince Carlo Ruspoli
Names
- Mario dei Principi Ruspoli
- House: Ruspoli
- Father: Prince Emanuele Ruspoli
- Mother: Princess Caterina Vogoride-Conachi

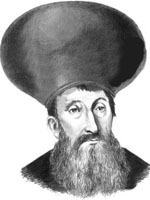
Great Chancellor Costache Conachi, maternal grandfather of Mario.

Mario dei Principi Ruspoli (October 16, 1867 – January 16, 1963) was an Italian prince, son of Emanuele Ruspoli, 1st Prince of Poggio Suasa and first wife Princess Caterina Vogoride-Conachi. He was the 2nd Prince of Poggio Suasa and Prince of the Holy Roman Empire.

He was responsible for the brief development of Chatsworth, New Jersey as a resort in the early 20th century.

== Marriage and children ==
He married in Paris, September 25, 1890 Pauline Marie Palma de Talleyrand-Périgord (Venice, April 2, 1871 – Rome, October 21, 1952), daughter of the Maurice de Talleyrand-Périgord, the 4th Duke of Dino and Elizabeth Beers-Curtis (a sister of his father's third wife), and great-great-great-niece of Charles Maurice de Talleyrand-Périgord, by whom he had five children:

- Costantino Carlo Michele Agostino dei Principi Ruspoli-Poggio Suasa (New York City, July 8, 1891 – Commander of the 11th Folgore Parachute Company, killed in action at the Second Battle of El Alamein in World War II at Deir El-Munassib, El Alamein, Egypt, October 25, 1942), married in Brussels, December 29, 1923 Elisabeth Catherine Adrienne Marie Anne Comtesse van der Noot d'Assche (Brussels, July 22, 1899 – Ixelles, March 27, 1974), by whom he had three sons:
  - Marcantonio Mario Dimitri Ruspoli, 3rd Prince of Poggio Suasa
  - Edoardo Eugenio Bosone dei Principi Ruspoli-Poggio Suasa (Brussels, February 17, 1928 –), unmarried and without issue
  - Marescotti Giovanni dei Principi Ruspoli-Poggio Suasa (Etterbeek, March 6, 1935 –), married firstly Yvonne Masse, by whom he had two sons, and secondly at Chelsea, London, September 6, 1963 Diana Baronesse d'Orville van der Hoop (Lausanne, January 21, 1943 –), by whom he had three daughters:
    - Francesco dei Principi Ruspoli-Poggio Suasa (December 11, 1958 –), unmarried and without issue
    - Alexis dei Principi Ruspoli-Poggio Suasa (November 28, 1959 –), married and had issue:
    - Livia dei Principi Ruspoli-Poggio Suasa (March 26, 1966 –), married Jean-Pierre Tasiaux, and had issue
    - Serena dei Principi Ruspoli-Poggio Suasa (January 17, 1971 –), unmarried and without issue
    - Dáphne Barbara Philippa dei Principi Ruspoli-Poggio Suasa (Uccle, September 29, 1972 –), married civilly at Uccle, May 29, 1998 and religiously at Èze, June 27, 1998 François, Comte Didisheim (Ixelles, January 16, 1960 –), and had issue
- Carlo Mauricio Marescotti dei Principi Ruspoli-Poggio Suasa (New York City, New York, October 17, 1892 – Lieut-Col. in Command of a Battle Group of the Folgore Parachute Division, KIA at the Second Battle of El Alamein in World War II at El Alamein, Egypt, October 24, 1942), married in Rome, June 10, 1935 Virginia dei Marchesi Patrizi Naro Montoro (Rome, February 22, 1901 – Rome, August 6, 1977), whose mother was English, by whom he had a son and a daughter:
  - Eugenio dei Principi Ruspoli-Poggio Suasa (Rome, June 12, 1938 –), married in Paris, May 2, 1960 Catherine Carolus-Barré (Saint-Jean-de-Luz, August 13, 1941 –), by whom he had a daughter and a son:
    - Smeralda dei Principi Ruspoli-Poggio-Suasa (Rome, August 19, 1961 –), unmarried and without issue
    - Marescotti Carlo dei Principi Ruspoli-Poggio Suasa (Rome, September 23, 1963 –), married and had issue
  - Francesca Patrizia Palma Rita Maria Raimonda Carla dei Principi Ruspoli-Poggio Suasa (Rome, July 17, 1940 –), married in Rome, July 12, 1969 Eriprando Visconti di Modrone, Count of Vico Modrone (Milan, September 24, 1932 – Mortara, March 28, 1995), and had a son and a daughter, both unmarried and without issue
- Alessandro Edmondo Eugenio dei Principi Ruspoli-Poggio Suasa (Chatsworth, New Jersey, March 14, 1895 – Rome, 1975), married in Paris, August 28, 1924 Marthe-Marie de Pineton de Chambrun (Paris, January 7, 1899 – 1984), by whom he had one son and two daughters:
  - Mario Giovanni Battista Pietro dei Principi Ruspoli-Poggio Suasa (Rome, June 17, 1925 – Paris, June 13, 1986), married firstly in Paris, April 8, 1947 and divorced Claude Delmas (La Rochelle, March 16, 1924 –), by whom he had two sons, and secondly on April 4, 1974 Dominique Rivolier (Neuilly-sur-Seine, August 12, 1946 –), without issue:
    - Stefano dei Principi Ruspoli-Poggio Suasa (Paris, October 5, 1947 –), married firstly in Paris, 1978 Laurence Allix, by whom he had an only daughter, and secondly in Paris Annie Nataf, without issue:
      - Léonore dei Principi Ruspoli-Poggio Suasa (Paris, October 31, 1981 –)
    - Fabrizio dei Principi Ruspoli-Poggio Suasa (Paris, April 4, 1951 –), unmarried and without issue
  - Giacinta Palma Margherita Maria dei Principi Ruspoli-Poggio Suasa (Rome, March 3, 1927 – Rome, March 27, 1953), unmarried and without issue
  - Palma Maria dei Principi Ruspoli-Poggio Suasa (Lausanne, August 19, 1928 –), married ... di Maio
- Emanuele Costantino dei Principi Ruspoli-Poggio Suasa (Florence, June 5, 1900 – ?), married Teresa Tomassetti, by whom he had two son:
  - Carlo Maurizio dei Principi Ruspoli-Poggio Suasa (Sabaudia, October 25, 1949), married in Rome Iolanda Padovano, by whom he had three daughter:
    - Gioia dei Principi Ruspoli-Poggio Suasa (Roma, December 17, 1986)
    - Smeralda dei Principi Ruspoli-Poggio Suasa (Roma, December 17, 1986)
    - Margherita dei Principi Ruspoli-Poggio Suasa (Roma, September 5, 1989)
  - Camillo dei Principi Ruspoli-Poggio Suasa
- Carlo Maurizio Giuseppe Edgardo dei Principi Ruspoli-Poggio Suasa (Oberhofen, August 25, 1906 – Buenos Aires, June 11, 1947), married firstly in Venice, September 12, 1927 Marina dei Conti Volpi di Misurata (Venice, February 19, 1908 – March 9, 1977), by whom he had an only daughter, and secondly in Rome Luisa Maria Camperio (1914 – Rome, August 30, 1948), by whom he had an only son:
  - Esmeralda Giovanna Amelia Palma Maria dei Principi Ruspoli-Poggio Suasa (Rome, June 24, 1928 – Panarea (Sicily), 1988), married in Rome Giancarlo Sbragia (Rome, March 14, 1926 – June 27, 1994)
  - Costantino Filippo Maria dei Principi Ruspoli-Poggio Suasa (New York City, New York, April 23, 1947 –), unmarried, who by Maria Consuelo (Lily) Child-Villiers of the Earls of Jersey (August 21, 1953 –), unmarried, whose mother was Italian, a former niece by marriage of Virginia Cherrill and paternal granddaughter of George Child Villiers, 8th Earl of Jersey, aunt of actor, writer and producer William Villiers, had an only son (despite their equal aristocratic birth never married to each other nor to anyone else):
    - Bartolomeo Sebastian Ruspoli (London, November 8, 1976 –), actor

== Cultural and charitable interests ==
- Rotary Club of New York

== Ancestry ==
Ancestors of Mario Ruspoli, 2nd Prince of Poggio Suasa

8. Francesco Ruspoli, 3rd Prince of Cerveteri
4. Prince Bartolomeo Ruspoli
9. Countess Maria Leopoldina von Khevenhüller-Metsch
2. Emanuele Francesco Ruspoli, 1st Prince of Poggio Suasa
10. Valerio Ratti
5. Carolina Ratti
11. Luigia Masucci
1. Prince Mario Ruspoli, 2nd Prince of Poggio Suasa
12. Magistrate Manolache Conachi
6. Great Chancellor Costache Conachi
13. Princess Ileana Cantacuzino
3. Princess Caterina Vogoride-Conachi
14. Secretary Manolache Donici
7. Smaranda Negri-Donici
15. Princess Ileana Rosetti-Roznovanu

== See also ==
- Ruspoli
- Villa des Vergers – a countryside villa in Rimini, Italy, that Ruspoli owned between 1938 and 1946, employing Pietro Porcinai to design the villa's gardens

Italian nobility
Preceded by Emanuele Ruspoli, 1st Prince of Poggio Suasa	2nd Prince of Poggio Suasa; 1899–1963	Succeeded by Marcantonio Mario Ruspoli, 3rd Prince of Poggio Suasa
