= Wemmel Castle =

Coordinates: 50°54′26″N 4°18′12″E

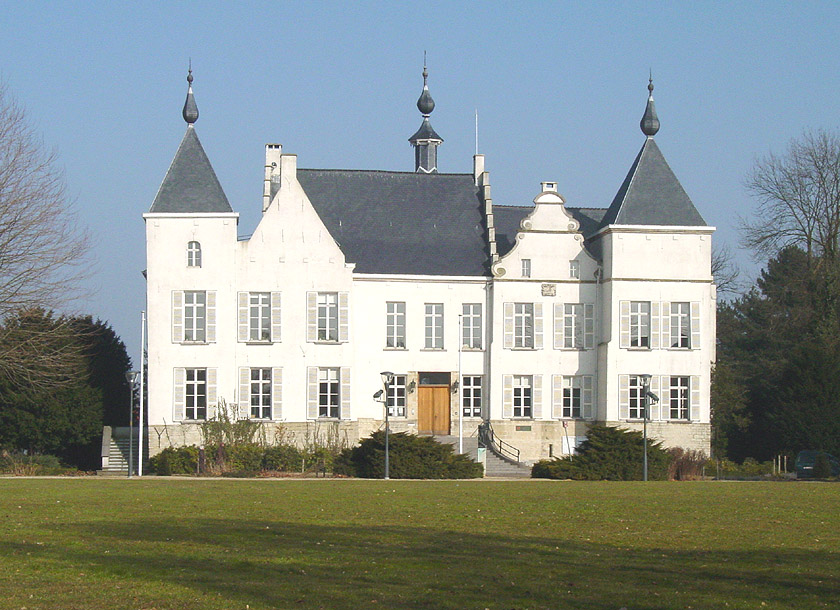
Wemmel Castle

Wemmel Castle (Dutch: Kasteel van Wemmel; French: Château de Wemmel) is a former aristocratic estate in the centre of Wemmel, Flemish Brabant, Belgium. It was formerly the property of the noble House of Taye.

== History ==
The castle was originally built as a fortification. In 1649, Philip-Albert Taye, 1st Marquess of Wemmel had his property redesigned in Baroque style. Inside, he decorated the rooms with his heraldic crest. In the 17th and 18th centuries, it was the main residence of the Marquess of Wemmel until Marie Josepha Taye, 6th Marquess of Assche and 3rd Marquess of Wemmel, married Jean-Antoine van der Noot. In 1838, the castle was sold to the mayor, Willem-Bernard Count of Limburg-Stirum. The House of Limburg-Stirum gave the estate to the local community.

== Today ==
Today the estate is still the property of the municipality of Wemmel, and functions as town hall. The park is open to the public.

== Bibliography ==
- Delmelle J., Wemmel et son Chateau in Brabant, n.p., 1962, p. 11-13.
- Dessaer R., Geschiedenis van Wemmel, Anderlecht-Brussel, 1945, p. 71-78.
