= Adrienne Barbanson =

Adrienne Barbanson van der Noot (1875–1944), Marquise of Assche and Wemmel, was an aristocratic patron of the arts in Belgium before and during the Second World War.

== Biography ==
Adrienne Barbanson was born in Paris on 29 June 1875, the daughter of the Belgian diplomat Alfred Barbanson and his wife Berthe Drion. In 1898 she married Edouard van der Noot, Marquess of Assche. Together they had four children, Elisabeth (born 1899), Marie-Thérèse (1900), Henri (1902) and Alfred (born 1908). Her husband died in 1928.

The marquise was the foundress of a charity, "Amis de Salzbourg", that provided bursaries for young Belgian musicians to visit the Salzburg Festival. This later became the "Association mozartienne de Belgique". After the German annexation of Austria in 1938 she turned her attention to organising benefit concerts in Brussels to support needy musicians, continuing to host concerts even during the German occupation. In the later 1930s she was also a member of CABEM (Comité de Rapatriement et d'Assistance aux Asiles de l'Ambassade de Belgique à Madrid), an organisation assisting Spanish refugees.

She died in Brussels on 27 May 1944.
