= Johann Theodor van der Noot =

Johann Theodor Van der Noot
- Apostolic Vicar of Luxembourg
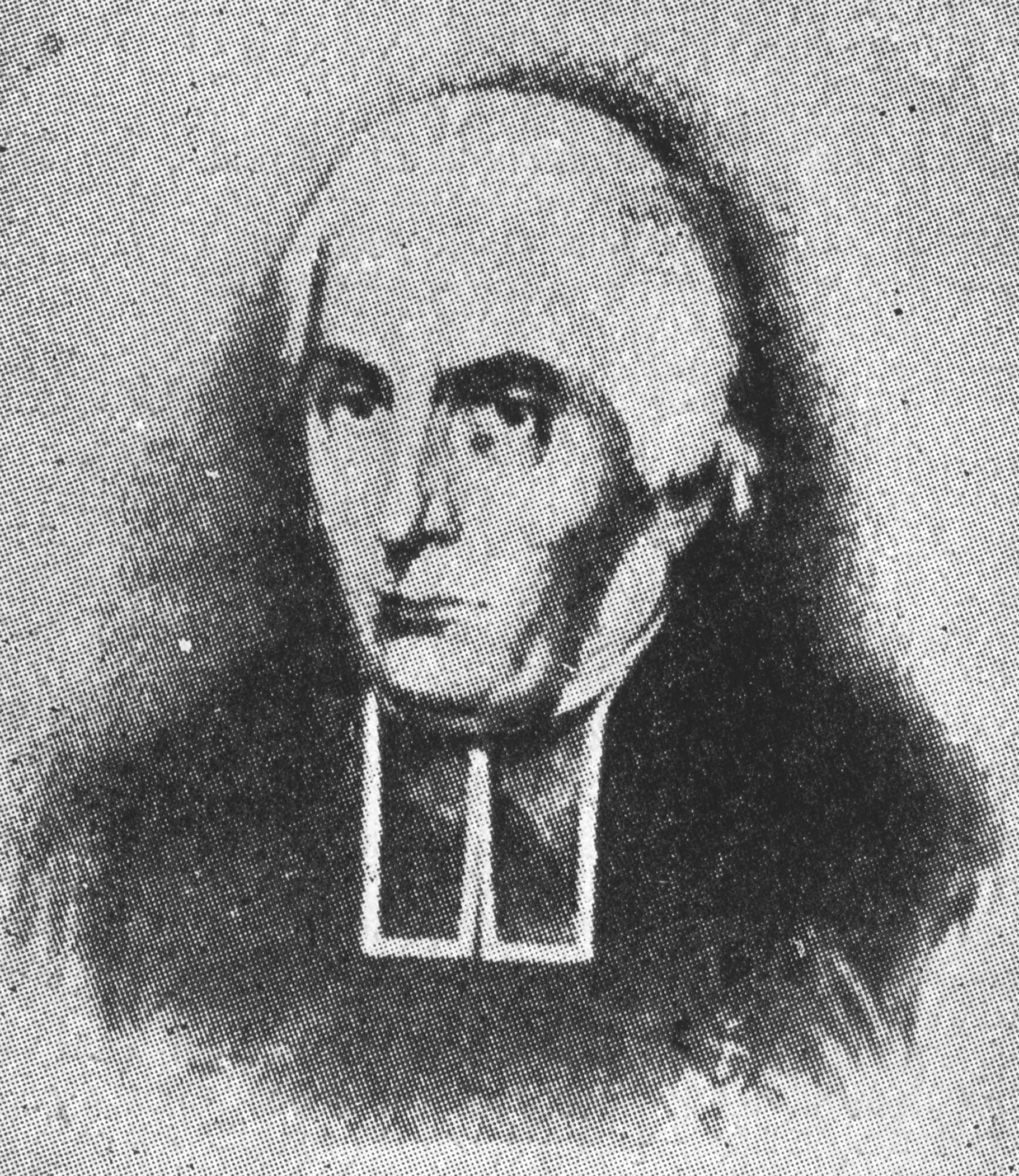
- Church: Catholic Church
- See: Apostolic Vicariate of Luxembourg
- In office: 25 December 1833 – 13 December 1841
- Predecessor: Vicariate established
- Successor: Jean-Théodore Laurent

Orders
- Ordination: 1797

Personal details
- Born: 6 August 1769 Luxembourg City, Duchy of Luxembourg, Austrian Netherlands, Habsburg Empire
- Died: 19 April 1843 (aged 73)

Johann Theodor or Jean Théodore van der Noot (1769–1843) was the first Apostolic Vicar of Luxembourg.

== Life ==
Van der Noot was born in Luxembourg on 6 April 1769, to the merchant Jean-Nicolas van der Noot and his wife Madeleine Herman. He was descended from the Brussels patrician lineage of House van der Noot. A distant cousin of the last Princess Abbess of Nivelles (1776-1794), Marie Felicite Van der Noot, he graduated from Leuven University as the first of his year in Philosophy, and received Holy orders in the Catholic Church at Trier. When Luxembourg fell under French revolutionary rule, members of the clergy were obliged to take the oath to uphold the Civil Constitution of the Clergy. Van der Noot refused, and was condemned to deportation. In 1797 he escaped to Trier, secretly returning to Luxembourg the following year and living there clandestinely until 18 January 1800, when his sentence was quashed.

After the Concordat of 1801, he was appointed parish priest of Itzig in 1802, of Bettembourg in 1823, and of St Peter's church (now Notre Dame Cathedral), Luxembourg, in 1832. In 1833 he became apostolic prefect for those parts of Luxembourg under Dutch control (the rest, under Belgian control, being subject to the bishop of Namur), and in 1840 he was appointed first apostolic vicar for the whole of the Grand Duchy of Luxembourg as established under the Treaty of London (1839). He formally retired on 20 February 1842, his successor, Jean-Théodore Laurent, already having been appointed the previous December. He died on 19 April 1843.

Catholic Church titles
Preceded by first appointment	Apostolic Vicar of Luxembourg; 1840 – 1842	Succeeded by Jean-Théodore Laurent
