= Marie Josepha Taye =

Noble lady from Flanders (1740–1820)

Marie Josepha Taye (1740- 10 November 1820), Countess van der Noot and Marquise of Assche and Wemmel, was a noble lady from Flanders.

She was born as daughter of the Marquess of Wemmel, François Philippe Taye, and Catherine Louise de Cottereau, daughter of the Marquess of Assche. Until her marriage on 17 May 1763 to Jean-Antoine, Count van der Noot (the nephew of Maximilian-Atoine van der Noot, Bishop of Ghent) she resided from 1754 as noble lay canoness in Nivelles. All eight of her great-grandparents belonged to the high nobility: Taye, Coudenhove, d'Orgnies, de Berghes Saint Winnoc, de Coutereau, de Nesselrode, Leefdael en Vlaederaecken.

She held the Order of the Starry Cross.

She resided in Wemmel Castle and Schoonhove Castle, that she had built in 1777.

== Children ==
- Joseph Amour Philippe van der Noot (born 1761)
- Maximilian-Louis van der Noot (29 May 1764 – 1847), 7th Marquess of Assche; and baron of Schoonhoven; (born 1764)
  married to Albertine-Josephe Roose.
  - Marie-Josèphe, countess van der Noot (1805);
    married to Gustave de Lannoy
- Marie Louise Josephe van der Noot (born 1765)
- François Marie Joseph van der Noot (born 1770)
- Jean Philippe Joseph van der Noot (born 1771)
- Philippe Henri François Xavier Guilain van der Noot (born 1772)
- Paul Guilain Roger Eugène Joseph van der Noot (born 1774)
