= Villa des Vergers =

Countryside villa in Rimini, Italy

- Interactive map of the Villa des Vergers area
- Former names: Villa Belmonte

General information
- Status: Completed
- Type: Villa
- Architectural style: Neoclassical
- Location: Via Monte L'Abate 32, San Lorenzo in Correggiano, Rimini, Emilia-Romagna, Italy
- Coordinates: 44°0′45.88″N 12°34′54.17″E
- Named for: Adolphe Noël des Vergers
- Year built: 17th century
- Renovated: 1879

Technical details
- Size: 4,000 square metres (43,000 sq ft)
- Grounds: 104,500 square metres (1,125,000 sq ft)

Design and construction
- Architects: Arthur-Stanislas Diet; Georges Chedanne

Website
- villadesvergers.it

The Villa des Vergers is a countryside villa in San Lorenzo in Correggiano, a frazione of Rimini, in the region of Emilia-Romagna, northern Italy. Dating to the 17th century, the villa was purchased by Adolphe Noël des Vergers in 1843, and substantially redesigned in 1879 by Arthur-Stanislas Diet. Between 1938 and 1946, it was owned by Mario Ruspoli, 2nd Prince of Poggio Suasa, who employed Pietro Porcinai to design the villa's gardens. The villa was used as a military headquarters by German forces in the Second World War, and has since been owned by a series of local entrepreneurs.

Since 2021, the villa has hosted civil wedding ceremonies. It is also used for corporate events.

== Bibliography ==
- Emanuele Mussoni, Villa des Vergers-Ruspoli e il giardino di Pietro Porcinai, Rimini, Associazione Adolphe Noël des Vergers - Edizioni Medusa, 2011.

== History ==
17th-century records attest to a villa in San Lorenzo in Correggiano owned by the Riminese Diotallevi family. In later years, the villa was owned by the Belmonte family, whose final owner, Giovan Maria Belmonti Stivivi, hosted Napoleon Bonaparte at the villa.

In 1843, the villa was purchased by Adolphe Noël des Vergers. The des Vergers family entertained notable guests at the villa. With the death of Hèlene Noël des Vergers in 1934, the family left the villa. In 1938, collections from the library were accommodated in the purpose-built Sala des Vergers in Rimini's Biblioteca Civica Gambalunga.

Between 1938 and 1946, the villa was owned by Mario Ruspoli, 2nd Prince of Poggio Suasa. During the Second World War, the building was used by the occupying Germans as a military headquarters. On two occasions, partisans attacked officers and couriers on their way to the villa. Some structures in the villa also sheltered local residents. The villa was a military target in the Battle of Coriano, and was captured by the Royal 22nd Regiment on the afternoon of 15 September 1944.

In 1946, the villa was acquired by Attilio Castiglioni; following his death in 1988, it was bought by Luigi Annibali and Piero Reggini. In 1994, the villa was purchased by Andrea Angelo Facchi, a local entrepreneur. In the early 2000s, the villa was the start of an annual nativity procession in San Lorenzo. In 2007, the villa's degradation, especially that of its chapel and garden, prompted an appeal for public intervention by Riccionese writer Rosita Copioli. In its response, Rimini's municipal government emphasised the difficulty of public intervention given the villa's private ownership.

Following Facchi's death in 2012, the villa entered into the property of his heirs. In 2016, the villa was advertised for sale at a reported price of €12 million.

In September 2020, Antonio Pappalardo, an Italian anti-vaccination politician and former carabinieri general, announced a symposium at the villa to plan the arrest of Giuseppe Conte, Prime Minister of Italy, and form a new national government.

In 2021, Rimini's municipal government approved the hosting of civil wedding ceremonies in the villa. The venue hire cost was initially fixed at €2,500.

== Architecture and layout ==
The villa measures almost 4,000 square metres (43,000 sq ft), with 48 rooms, including 20 bedrooms and 10 bathrooms. It was substantially redesigned in 1879 by Arthur-Stanislas Diet using Istrian stone, and also features the work of Georges Chedanne. Designed in neoclassical style, the villa is among the few local examples of Napoleon III's architecture. It includes a chapel.

The property's total size is 104,500 square metres (1,125,000 sq ft), of which 74,600 square metres (803,000 sq ft) are gardens. The park surrounding the villa was designed by Pietro Porcinai, during Ruspoli's ownership of the villa. Two-thirds of the park is wooded, particularly the perimeter. The garden is oriented to the south, with a rectangular pool at its end and flanked by holm oaks. It contains sculptures with mythological themes.

The property also includes a 1,700-square-metre (18,000 sq ft) farm, as well as a citrus orchard, two guardhouses on either side of the entrance gate, three greenhouses, and a belvedere.

== Listed status ==
The first regulatory protections for the villa were adopted by Gaston des Vergers in 1913. In 1993, a local residents' association campaigned for the protections to be extended to the surrounding hill. On 3 January 1996, the villa was designated a site of considerable landscape interest (Italian: notevole interesse paesaggistico), subjecting it to particular regulations under the Superintendency of Ravenna and the Ministry of Cultural Heritage.

== In popular culture ==
The villa features in the music video for Lo specchio dell'anima, a 2023 song by Gianni Drudi.

== See also ==
- Villa Mussolini – a seaside villa in nearby Riccione purchased by the family of Benito Mussolini, Italy's fascist dictator, in 1934
