= Marquess of Wemmel =

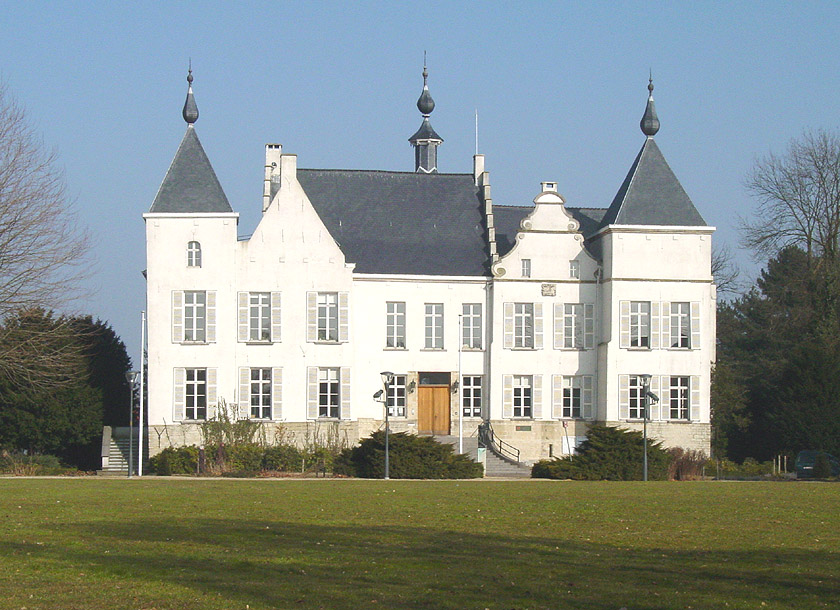
Wemmel Castle, former residence of the Marquess of Wemmel

The Marquess of Wemmel was a Flemish title in use during the Ancien Régime, Wemmel is a city in Flanders.

== History ==
The title was created in 1688 for Philip Taye, 1st Marquess of Wemmel captain in the Spanish army. Until 1688 he was Baron of Wemmel, this title came from his ancestor Gyselbrecht Taye. His family was generations in charge of the Heerlijkheid of Wemmel. Their daughter, Marie Jospeha Taye married to the count Jean-Antoine van der Noot. The house of Taye, who was member of the Seven Noble Houses of Brussels resided in Wemmel Castle.

The marquess took an important ceremonial position and was seated in the States of Brabant, and was ceremonial Lord Chamberlain of the Archduchess. Other people of the Taye family include Maria de Taye.

== Marquesses of Wemmel ==
1. Philip-Albert Taye, 1st Marquess of Wemmel
2. François Philippe Taye, 2nd Marquess of Wemmel married to Catherine Louise de Cottereau, 5th Marquess of Assche.
3. Marie Josepha Taye 6th Marquess of Assche and 3rd Marquess of Wemmel married to Jean-Antoine van der Noot.
