= Elisabeth van der Noot d'Assche =

Belgian noble (1899–1974)

Elisabeth, Countess van der Noot, Countess of Assche (July 22, 1899 in Brussels – March 27, 1974) was a Belgian aristocratic lady. During the Second World War, she became friendly with the highest circles of the German occupation authorities, whilst in a few occasions helping the resistance.

== Descent and family ==
Elisabeth was the first child of the 9th Marquess of Assche, Edouard Dimitri van der Noot (1860–1928) and Adrienne Barbanson (1875–1944). On December 19, 1923, Elisabeth married the Roman aristocrat Costantino Ruspoli de Poggio-Suasa, who was making a diplomatic career. They had met each other while his father, Mario Ruspoli, 2nd Prince of Poggio Suasa, was an ambassador in Brussels (1919–1924). The spouses established themselves in the city, where they had three children: Marcantonio (°28.11.1926–2003), Edoardo (°February 17, 1928) and Giovanni Marescotti (°06.03.1935). On January 8, 1930 they attended the wedding of the Italian crown prince Umberto and the Belgian princess Marie José.

At the outbreak of the war, Costantino joined the Italian army and became captain of the 11th Folgore Parachute Company. He was killed on October 25, 1942 at the Second Battle of El Alamein, while defending Hill 77, the most advanced Italian position, during operation Lightfoot.

== Double role during the war? ==
The widow of the posthumously decorated commander had remained in Brussels. She became intimate with the occupying authorities in Belgium, amongst whom the military governor Alexander von Falkenhausen and his close collaborators, chief of the Command Staff Bodo von Harbou and civilian administrator Eggert Reeder. Freiherr von Falkenhausen had taken up quarters in the Palais d'Assche, where Elisabeth had grown up. "Elisa" became the unofficial 'public relations' of Falkenhausen.

Falkenhausen had made his career in the Reichswehr and was somewhat mistrustful of and distrusted by the nazi's. During week-ends he hosted at Seneffe Castle, left behind by the Jewish bankers' family Philippson and now declared "ownerless, non-Arian Capital". With Elisabeth by his side, he would invite the highest Belgian nobility: prince Albert de Ligne, duke de Croÿ, and also princess Marie José, sister of king Leopold. High-ranking officers, such as Gerd von Rundstedt and Carl-Heinrich von Stülpnagel, would also join in frequently. Hunting parties were held there, or in the castle Ter Rijst, where Elisabeth leased the hunting and fishing rights. In this period Elisa is mentioned in Falkenhausen's diary almost on a daily basis.

At the same time Elisabeth played a small part within resistance activities. She is said to have provided food for allied pilots, who were hidden by the Comet line, group organizing routes to Spain.

According to her son, she would receive each day dozens of requests for "humanitarian interventions".

== Arrest ==
In the beginning of December 1943, Elisabeth was arrested in the hôtel Bristol (Paris) by the SD and taken to Berlin. The city was being bombarded and at one point she and her Gestapo guard Hertha Schulz had to run for hours through the streets, searching shelter. After interrogation and accused of currency smuggling, she was deported to the concentration camp of Ravensbrück. Harbou had been arrested on the same grounds and died a few weeks later in a Berlin cell, under unclear circumstances.

Several months earlier, in July, Ulrich von Hassell had warned that the NSDAP considered Falkenhausen's relations with the Belgians all too intimate and that he was being watched by the Gestapo. When what he had feared came true, a disapproving Von Hassell wrote in his diary that her phone had been tapped and that the accusations against her were not political but moral (black money market and immorality). With the aim of discrediting Falkenhausen, it was even being rumoured that Elisabeth and Alexander were lovers and had married in the Antwerp Cathedral.

Falkenhausen asked Wilhelm Keitel for her release, but in vain: he was told that she had been arrested on the personal orders of Benito Mussolini. In Ravensbrück, Elisabeth became friendly with, amongst others, countess Lagi von Ballestrem, a resistance fighter who had been with the Solf Circle. They had been assigned with sorting confiscated jewellery. Helmuth James von Moltke, whom she had got to know in Brussels, gave her a copy of Rudyard Kipling's If.

Elisabeths arrest was a prelude to the fall of Falkenhausen himself, who was dismissed on July 18, 1944 and replaced by a Reichskommissar: Josef Grohé. A few days later he was arrested for his suspected role in the 20 July plot against Hitler. He was deported to Dachau. At this point the relationship between Falkenhausen and Ruspoli, and similar relations of German highranking officers with Belgian citizens, provoked a comment by Hitler.

== Return ==
After a few months in Ravensbrück, Elisabeth was retained in a forced residence in Thüringen. Freed in May 1945, she made her way back to Brussels. The American ambassador's wife Lydia Kirk recounted how, after the war, she discreetly mingled again with the higher circles. Her beauty and adventurous life exerted fascination. Kirk called her "a miniature Marlène Dietrich" and "a pocket Venus". Neither did she fail to mention the rumour that Elisbeth had received high-ranking German officers while taking a bath, or Elisabeth's boast that she had converted her German camp guard to catholicism.

Meanwhile, Falkenhausen was imprisoned, first in Neurenberg and later in Belgium. He corresponded extensively with his "Sainte-Elisabeth". At the Falkenhausen trial, Karl Otto von Kameke gave testimony on his relationship with Elisabeth Ruspoli. Falkenhausen was sentenced to twelve years of hard labour, but released a few days afterwards.

The widow Ruspoli died, thirty years after the Liberation, in her home town. She had not been recognized as a member of the Resistance, but was accepted as a political prisoner.
