= Marcantonio Mario Dimitri Ruspoli, 3rd Prince of Poggio Suasa =

Marcantonio Mario Ruspoli

Prince of Poggio Suasa
- Tenure: 1963–2003
- Predecessor: Prince Mario Ruspoli
- Successor: Prince Costantino Mário Ruspoli
- Born: November 28, 1926; Etterbeek, Brussels, Belgium
- Died: August 1, 2003 (aged 76); Recife, Pernambuco, Brazil
- Spouse: Lúcia Helena Pessoa de Mello; Gleide Portela Chagas
- Issue: Princess Adriana Ruspoli; Princess Elisabeth Ruspoli; Princess Christiane Ruspoli; Prince Costantino Mario Ruspoli, 4th Prince of Poggio Suasa; Princess Diana Ruspoli; Prince Pietro Ruspoli
Names
- Marcantonio Mario Dimitri dei Principi Ruspoli
- House: Ruspoli
- Father: Prince Constantino Ruspoli
- Mother: Countess Elisabeth Catherine van der Noot d'Assche

Marcantonio Mario Dimitri dei Principi Ruspoli (November 28, 1926 – August 1, 2003) was the 3rd Principe di Poggio Suasa and Prince of the Holy Roman Empire, Ambassador of Italy to Argentina and Brazil and businessperson, son of Prince Costantino Ruspoli (Costantino is an eldest son of Mario Ruspoli, 2nd Prince of Poggio Suasa), and wife Princess Elisabeth Catherine Adrienne Marie Anne born Comtesse van der Noot d'Assche.

== Personal life ==
Marcantonio Mario Dimitri Ruspoli, 3rd Prince of Poggio Suasa, was born as the eldest son of Costantino Carlo Michele Agostino dei Principi Ruspoli-Poggio Suasa and Countess Elisabeth van der Noot d'Assche. His upbringing was marked by a unique fusion of Italian noble traditions and the cosmopolitan values of his Belgian lineage. This blend of cultural influences deeply shaped his identity and decisions throughout his life, allowing him to balance the legacies of both family heritages.

Prince Marcantonio Mario Dimitri grew up in an environment of significant contrasts. His father, Costantino Carlo, was a military hero who commanded the 11th Paratrooper Company Folgore and lost his life during the Second Battle of El Alamein in World War II. His mother, Elisabeth, provided him with a refined European education, nurturing his appreciation for culture and the arts.

Beyond his aristocratic education, Marcantonio Mario Dimitri successfully integrated his noble heritage with a practical, modern approach. In the industrial sector, he excelled as an entrepreneur and served as Italy’s ambassador to Brazil and Argentina, strengthening diplomatic and cultural ties between the nations. His ability to reconcile tradition and innovation reflects his versatility and the influence of his distinguished family background on his life choices.

== Marriages and children ==
He married firstly at Recife, Pernambuco, November 17, 1951 and divorced in 1958 Lúcia Helena Pessoa de Mello (April 22, 1922 –), a Portuguese Brazilian, without issue.

He married secondly at Maceió, Alagoas, September 8, 1981 Gleide Chagas Portela (Catende, Pernambuco, November 18, 1935 – Recife, Pernambuco, July 3, 1992), a Portuguese Brazilian, daughter of Pedro Chagas and wife Natália Portela, by whom he had six children:

- Donna Adriana dei Principi Ruspoli-Poggio Suasa (Recife, Pernambuco, February 27, 1963 –), unmarried and without issue.
- Donna Elizabeth dei Principi Ruspoli-Poggio Suasa (Recife, Pernambuco, January 17, 1965 –), married at Recife, Pernambuco, December 2, 1990 Natanael Gonçalves, by whom she had an only daughter:
  - Nataly Gonçalves (São Paulo, São Paulo, September 2, 1994 –).
- Donna Christiane dei Principi Ruspoli-Poggio Suasa (Recife, Pernambuco, January 25, 1968 –), married on March 31, 1990 José Portella de Macedo, Jr., by whom she had an only son:
  - José Eduardo Ruspoli Portella de Macedo (Manaus, Amazonas, March 17, 1991 –) He married on January 09, 2021 Allany Carvalho de Melo.
- Don Costantino Mario Ruspoli, 4th Prince of Poggio Suasa (Recife, Pernambuco, June 29, 1971 –)
- Donna Diana dei Principi Ruspoli-Poggio Suasa (Recife, Pernambuco, March 5, 1973 –), married in Recife, Pernambuco, June 2, 2002 Fábio Miguel Santos, by whom she had an only son:
  - Fábio Henrique Miguel Ruspoli dos Santos (Recife, Pernambuco, August 5, 2005 –).
- Don Pietro Marcos Ruspoli (Maceió, Alagoas, March 25, 1981 – Maceió, Alagoas, March 28, 1981).

== See also ==
- Ruspoli

== Sources ==
- House of Ruspoli of Poggio Suasa
- Genealogy website
- Genealogy website
- Genealogy website

Italian nobility
Preceded by Don Mario Ruspoli, 2nd Prince of Poggio Suasa	3rd Prince of Poggio Suasa; 1963–2003	Succeeded by Don Costantino Mario Ruspoli, 4th Prince of Poggio Suasa
