= Pietro Porcinai =

Italian landscape architect (1910–1986)

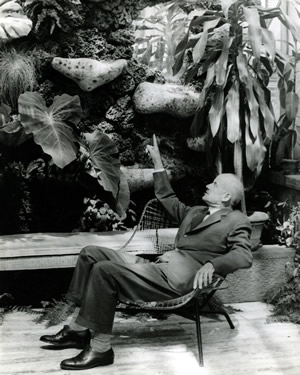
- Born: 20 December 1910; Fiesole, Province of Florence, Kingdom of Italy
- Died: 9 June 1986 (aged 75); Florence, Italy
- Occupation: Architect

Pietro Porcinai (20 December 1910 – 9 June 1986) was an Italian landscape architect from the twentieth century. He designed a wide variety of projects in various disciplines: gardens and public parks, industrial districts, hotels and tourist villages, motorways and agricultural areas. The hundreds of projects implemented in Italy and abroad comprise “landscaped” gardens, integrated within the surroundings as to appear untouched by human hand.

== Biography ==
Porcinai’s education in landscape architecture began early since his father was in charge of the gardens at the Villa Gamberaia, an early seventeenth-century villa in the village of Settignano, overlooking Florence. As a youth, he studied horticulture at the prestigious Regia Scuola Agraria Media agricultural college. After graduation, he started working full-time as a landscape designer at the Martino Bianchi nursery in Pistoia, and later worked in Belgium and Germany. His travels abroad brought him into contact with contemporary European design. He met famous plant breeders and horticulturalists (Fritz Encke, Karl Foerster) and the most eminent European garden and landscape architects (Russel Page, Geoffrey Jellicoe, René Pechère and Gerda Gollwitzer). This experience gave the young Porcinai a chance to compare his own education in design and horticulture with a broader concept of the profession that was in sharp contrast with the Italian tradition of formal garden design.

== Professional activity ==
In the 1930s he launched his lifelong struggle for the recognition in Italy of garden and landscape design as a modern profession. In the world of Italian architecture and town planning non-architects were generally excluded from landscape design. In 1937 Porcinai began writing for the magazine Domus (magazine) directed by Giò Ponti, which rapidly become Europe’s most influential design publication. This gave him not only his own professional opening, but also the opportunity to educate both architects and the public at large in the importance of landscape design. In 1938 Porcinai settled a studio in Florence with the architects Nello Baroni and Maurizio Tempestini. This dynamic studio rapidly became a benchmark in the cultural life of the city, introducing Porcinai to the influential business dynasties who were to remain his loyal clients throughout his professional career. In 1948 in Cambridge he was one of the 17 founder members of the International Federation of Landscape Architects (IFLA). A staunch defender of the natural and landscape heritage, at length he championed the cause of a proper training in landscape and garden architecture in Italy, coming up against a wall of indifference in the schools and even the universities. In 1950, with a handful of other pioneers, he fathered the foundation of the Italian section of the IFLA in the form of the AIAP (Italian Association of Garden and Landscape Architects) of which Porcinai was for many years secretary and, from 1979 on, Honorary President. In Italy the post-war economic reconstruction produced a new moneyed class of industrial entrepreneurs: manufacturers of televisions and textiles, and executives in the burgeoning empires of petroleum and technology. The Italian practice of holding design competitions for public projects provided more visibility for his expanding practice. From designing private gardens for industrialists it was a logical step to projecting sites for factories and offices: notable examples include the Mondadori centre in Segrate, Milan (in collaboration with Oscar Niemeyer), and the Brion Vega plant in Caselle d’Asolo, Venice. A growing reputation for swimming pool design led to commissions from hotels, including the Hotel des Bains at the Venice Lido and resort complexes such as the holiday village in Nicotera Marina in southern Italy. In the 1970s public parks and urban design projects became an important part of Porcinai’s practice, with an increasing number of commissions from outside Italy. Major projects included plans for parks in four Saudi Arabian cities (in collaboration with Albini, Helg and Partners), the Place Beaubourg in front of the Pompidou Centre in Paris (as consultant to the architects Piano and Rogers), a design for the Parco Sempione in Milan (with the architect Viganò), and the Parco della Favorita in Palermo, Sicily. He was also engaged in large-scale projects such as the new Brennero motorway in northern Italy and the intricate relocation of the Egyptian temple of Abu Simbel for UNESCO. Porcinai was convinced of the need to apply the lessons of the garden to the ecology of the urban context. He attacked the arrogant imposition of architectural theory on the modern city. However, he did not confine his criticism to the architectural profession: he was prepared to indict modern society for the twin evils of materialism and collectivism. The solution must lie in a process of education – in his words “a task of evangelisation”. Frustrated by the architects’ domination of design education in the Italian universities, in the 1960s Porcinai resolved to establish an educational centre at Villa Rondinelli. The villa would become in the 20th century what the neighbouring Villa Medici was in the Quattrocento – a meeting place for artists and philosophers. The new studios were constructed in the villa garden for this purpose. Unfortunately, the dream faded in the 1970s. Although Porcinai had acquired clients among the new elite, he had also made enemies. A period of enforced exile, during which he opened an office in Beirut, undermined the financial basis of the educational centre. Committed to the profession, he took an active part in a number of international conferences; in 1971 he took part in the First International Symposium on the protection and restoration of historic gardens in Fontainebleau held by ICOMOS (International Council on Monuments and Sites) where he promoted the ICOMOS-IFLA International Committee for Historic Gardens, which in 1982 drew up The Florence Charter on preservation of historic gardens, a set of rules governing the maintenance, conservation, restoration and reconstruction of historic gardens.

== Awards and distinctions ==
Porcinai won numerous prizes and awards, including the In-Arch prize in 1960 and the Award of Merit from the School of Environmental Design of the University of Georgia, and in 1979 the Friedrich Ludwig von Schkell Golden Ring by the Academy of Fine Arts Munich. His remarkable professional expertise ranked him among the elite of European landscape architects, a position consecrated in 1985 when he was the only living Italian to be assigned an extensive biography in The Oxford Companion to Gardens by Sir Geoffrey and Susan Jellicoe.

== Major written works ==
Along with his numerous designs and projects, Porcinai has also left a large number of articles which cast fascinating light upon his cultural vision, his strategy and his design concepts. He contributed to magazines and newspapers (both Italian and foreign) including Domus, Garten und Landschaft, Architecture d'Aujordhui, and other minor journals such as Il giardino fiorito, Flora, etc. In his published articles Porcinai called for training in landscape design, professional collaboration between planners, architects and landscape architects, sensitive road and motorway design and a sensitivity to regional characteristics in project development. For many years he was an outspoken critic of the modern city. In an article entitled Urbanité de l’urbanisme (L'Architecture d’aujourd’hui no. 118, February 1965), unanimously acclaimed by specialist critics, he attacked the arrogant imposition of architectural theory on the city. Other important writings include the essay Garden in the Italian Agrarian Encyclopaedia and Giardino e paesaggio 1942 - Accademia dei Georgofili. In May 1967 his book Giardini d’Occidente e d’Oriente, written with Attilio Mordini, was published by Fratelli Fabbri Editori.

== Works and important projects ==
- 1935: Tirana, Gardens of King Zog's Palace
- 1938–41: Turin, Private garden, Villa Bona
- 1938–43: Turin, Garden with swimming pool of Villa Maggia
- 1938–47: Reggio Emilia, Garden with swimming pool, orangery, vegetable garden, "La Barisella" estate
- 1938–46: Garden of the Villa des Vergers in Rimini
- 1939–40: Florence, Swimming pool of Villa I Collazzi
- 1947–65: Florence - Siena - Perugia - Rome - Capri - Turin - Milan - Genoa, Swimming pools and private gardens
- 1948–54: Florence, Garden Villa L'Imperialino
- 1951–58: Florence, Villa La Terrazza - Garden with swimming pool and lemon house
- 1952–59: Saronno (Varese), Garden of villa Fiorita
- 1952–59: Anghiari (Arezzo), Garden villa with swimming pool, tennis and riding school
- 1952–62: Pozzuoli (Naples), Landscaping of Olivetti headquarters and Ina-Olivetti district
- 1953–55: Roveta, Florence, restaurant renovation and park arrangement with swimming pool and minigolf
- 1954–56: Montecatini Terme (Pistoia), Swimming pool and park
- 1956–57: Berlin, park at the Hansaviertel
- 1957–63: San Donato, Milan, External arrangement and roof gardens offices-SNAM
- 1957–63: Como, Garden with swimming pool Villa on Lake Como
- 1957–64: Sansepolcro (Arezzo), Garden with swimming pool, tennis court, games room
- 1958–61: Milan, Alfio Restaurant: arrangement and extension of the winter garden
- 1959–69: Trivero (Biella), Garden of Villa Ca 'Gianin
- 1960–63: Trivero (Biella), Factory parking and garden, terrace and winter garden
- 1960–86: San Domenico - Fiesole (Florence), Restoration of the garden, restructuring of Villa Rondinelli and construction of greenhouses - studio.
- 1960: Isola Polvese, Trasimeno Lake, (Perugia), Garden with swimming pool, tennis court and landing stage
- 1961–65: Florence, Garden Villa Il Roseto
- 1961: Rapallo (Genoa), Hotel Bristol: green areas, parking, swimming pool
- 1962–64: Trivero Vercelli, Panoramic road and external arrangement of the Zegna factory
- 1963–71: Abu Simbel, UNESCO Temple Transfer Project - Consultancy.
- 1963–76: Collodi, Pinocchio Park
- 1963: Bascapé - Pavia, Memorial Enrico Mattei
- 1965–67: Cap Ferrat, Garden and swimming pool of two single-family villas
- Edmonton, Civic Center Lighting, Garden and Pool for a Private Villa
- Toronto, Public Gardens
- 1965–70: Siena, Garden of villa L'Apparita
- 1965–73: Autostrada del Brennero: Verona - Brenner section on behalf of the Autostrade Company.
- 1966–71: Ca 'Vescovo of Caselle d'Asolo (Treviso), Landscape arrangement of the Brion Vega factory
- 1966–80: Florence - Perugia -Varese - Siena - Pisa - Piedmont - Venice - Genoa, Gardens and private parks; private agricultural areas
- Selinunte, Agrigento, Archaeological Park: layout of the roads, study of management and green areas
- 1966: Cran sur Sierre, Private garden
- 1967–75: Trivero Vercelli, "Mountain Cemetery" and garden Villa il Roc
- 1967: Beirut, Private garden
- 1968–72: Marina di Nicotera (Vibo Valentia), Tourist village
- 1968: Venice, Garden and swimming pool of the Hotel des Bains
- 1969–84: Portofino, Garden with swimming pool
- 1969–79: Palermo, Feasibility study and preliminary design of the La Favorita park and Monte Pellegrino
- 1970–72: Florence, Garden of villa La Palmierina
- 1970–75: Florence, San Martino alla Palma, Arrangement of the park of villa Torrigiani with swimming pool and riding school
- 1970–78: Perugia, Garden with swimming pool, tennis court and gym
- 1971–72: Giulianova, Teramo, Hotel, green areas and swimming pool for the Onda Company
- 1971–80: Santa Croce sull'Arno (Pisa), Garden villa Il Castelluccio
- 1972–73: Taranto, New plant landscaping Italsider
- 1972–74: Florence, Garden with swimming pool of Villa Il Martello
- 1972-75: Cap Ferrat, private garden
- Segrate (Milan), Headquarters park Mondadori
- Montecarlo, Principality of Monaco, Arrangement of terraces and "Spelugues" real estate complex
- Brindisi, Tourist village and camping for the Torre Guaceto company
- 1973–78: Rome, Museum of Villa Giulia: green areas and hanging garden for the Museum of modern art
- 1973: Paris, Consultancy for the arrangement of the square and terraces Center Pompidou for architects R.Piano and R. Rogers
- Athens, Hanging Gardens of Private Houses
- Otranto, Lecce, Alimini Lakes tourist village landscaping for the Costa d'Otranto Company
- 1974–76: Asolo, Treviso, Consultancy for plantations Brion tomb (project by architect Carlo Scarpa)
- Abha, Medina, Taif - Saudi Arabia, Recreational parks - Project
- 1977–78: Athens, Garden and private parks
- Almeria, Garden with private swimming pool
- 1977–79: Reggio Emilia, Green areas of the new plant Max Mara
- 1977–83: Rome, Hotel Sheraton - swimming pool, green areas and fountains
- 1977: Teheran, Private park with swimming pool on behalf of the company Bonifica (Rome)
- Washington DC, International competition for green areas of the French Embassy
- 1978–83: Lugano, private park
- 1979: Rapallo, Genoa, New arrangement of green spaces - Hotel Bristol
- Sarche di Calavino, Trento, Environmental recovery project of a quarry for Italcementi
- Milan, Winter Garden of the Savini Restaurant
- 1981–82: Gavi Ligure, Alessandria, Project of a sports center for a public park. Broglia Foundation
- Bassano del Grappa, Green areas of the Nardini plant
- 1981–86: Tuscany - Liguria - Umbria, Gardens and private parks
- 1982–83: Parma, Plant green areas Barilla
- Fiesole, Florence, Project of the garden and swimming pool Hotel Villa San Michele
- 1982–86: Reggio Emilia, Green areas and courtyards, new Marina Rinaldi plant
- Cernobbio, Como, Villa d'Este: project for the new arrangement of the underground car parks with the roof garden above and the entrance square
- Reggio Emilia, Competition for the urban planning project of the Zucchi barracks area
- 1983–84: Venice, swimming pool and tennis courts hotel Cipriani
- Matera, Environmental recovery of a quarry for Italcementi
- Zoagli, Genoa, Arrangement of the square of the church of Sant'Ambrogio
- 1984–85: Cap Martin, Park with swimming pool, Villa Cypris
- Costa Rica, Private garden with tennis and swimming pool
- Naples, Green areas of the New Business Center on behalf of Mededil
- Sabaudia, Latina, Tourist village project for the Cogeca Society
- Como, Proposals for the new arrangement of Piazza Cavour
- Venice, 1970 - Winter garden Papadopoli Restaurant Hotel Sofitel Venice
