= Château des Amerois =

19th-century castle in Belgium

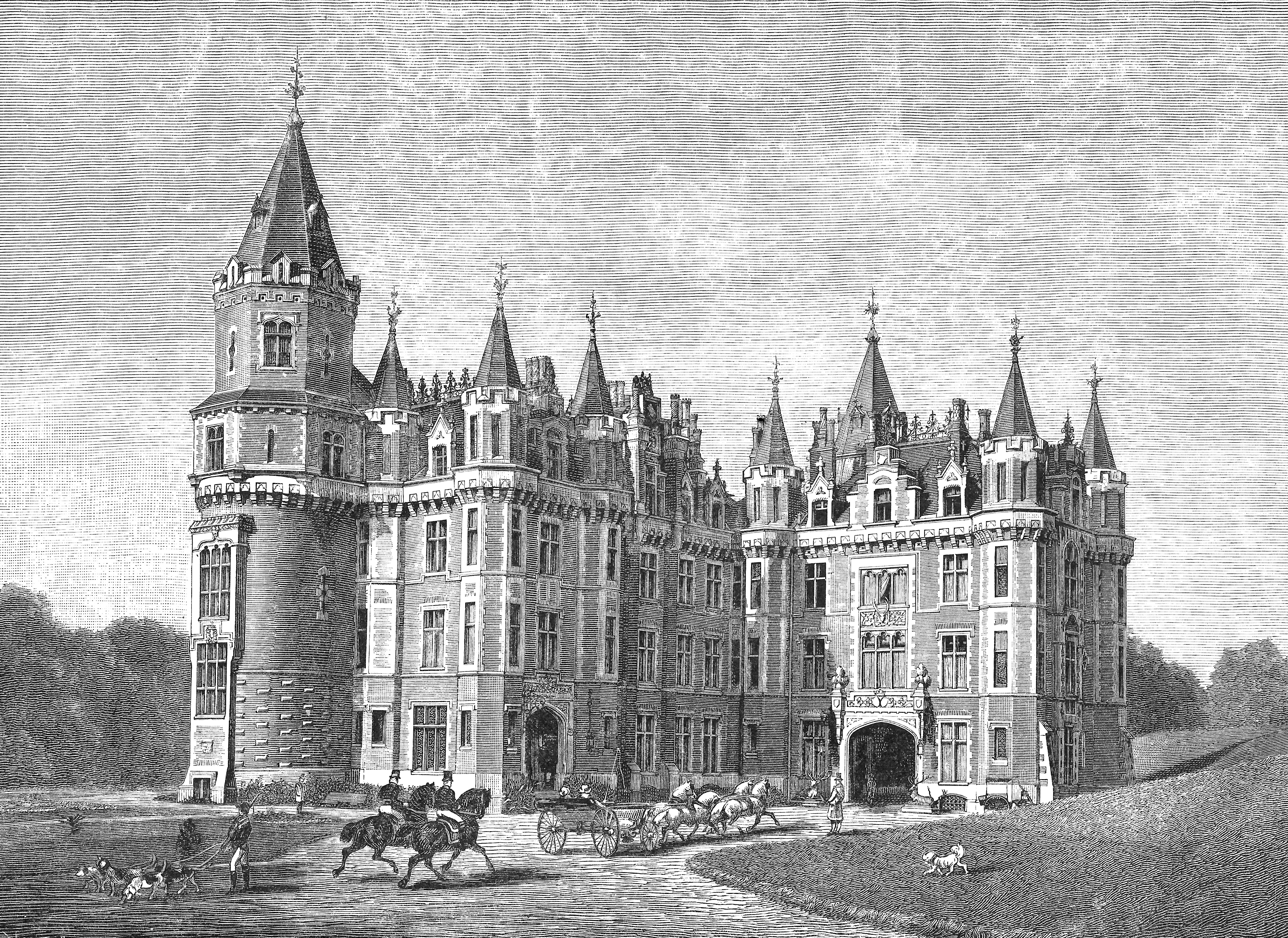
- Royal Château of Amerois, c. 1890
- Interactive map of the Château des Amerois area

General information
- Type: Château
- Architectural style: Gothic Revival
- Location: Belgium
- Coordinates: 49.748454°N 5.151091°E
- Construction started: 1874
- Completed: 1877

The Château des Amerois (French pronunciation: [ʃɑto dez‿amʁwa]) is a 19th-century neo-Gothic style château in the Ardennes forest, south-east of Bouillon, Wallonia, Belgium. Replacing an original building destroyed by fire, the current château was built from 1874 to 1877 for Prince Philippe, Count of Flanders.

== History ==
The domain was originally purchased in 1849 by the Count of Mesniel, who acquired land to build a manor house. In 1859, the property was purchased by Theodore van der Noot, 8th Marquess of Assche. Nine years later, the property was sold for 1 million Belgian francs to Prince Philippe, Count of Flanders, the brother of King Leopold II.

After a fire destroyed this first manor house in 1873, Prince Philippe commissioned the architect Gustave Saintenoy to build a replacement. The chapel received special attention and received polychromes by the painter Jules Helbig. The park houses redwoods and a 158-metre-long (518 ft) bower. Thousands of plant and flower species were grown in several greenhouses. Prince Philippe also planned sumptuous stables. Passionate about hunting, he spent several months a year at the château. His wife, Princess Marie of Hohenzollern-Sigmaringen, made sketches and watercolours.

When Prince Philippe died in 1905, his three children inherited the château and sold it to the Liège wood merchant Robert Colette for 7 million Belgian francs. He cut down practically all the trees and resold the property three years later to Alice Solvay, the niece of Ernest Solvay. Nowadays, the estate still belongs to her descendants.

During the First World War, a patrol of German soldiers commanded by Lt. Wolf-Werner von Blumenthal of the 2nd Reserve Heavy Cavalry occupied the château, which left it without major damage, except in the wine cellar.

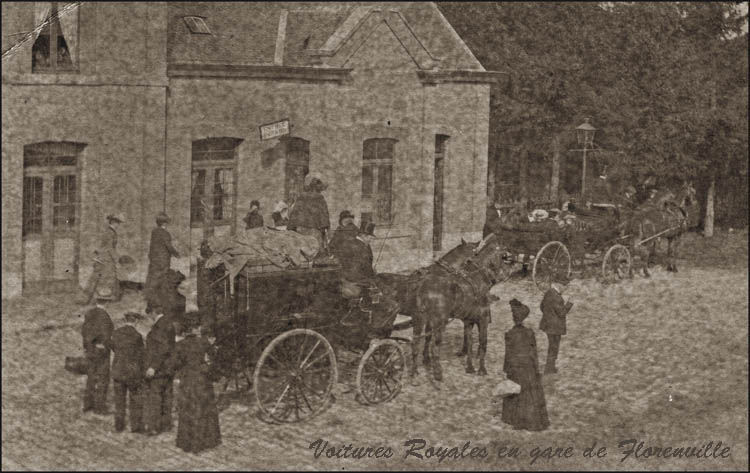
The royal carriages in front of Florenville railway station

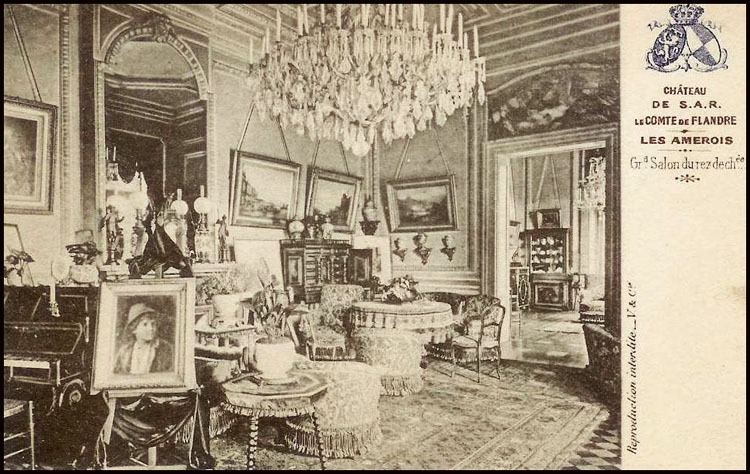
The large living room on the ground floor

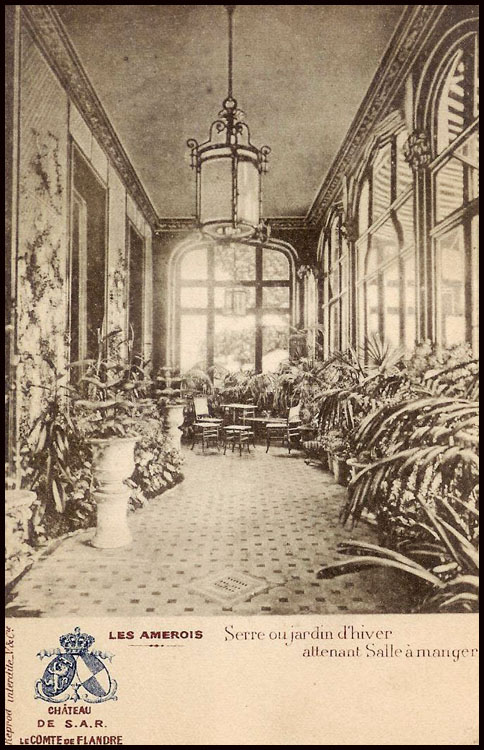
The Winter Garden

== Residents ==
- 1849: Count of Mesniel
- 1859: Theodore van der Noot, 8th Marquess of Assche
- 1868: Prince Philippe, Count of Flanders
- 1924: Robert Colette
- 1927: Alice Solvay
- 1931: Pierre Solvay
- 1989: Eldest son of Pierre Solvay as well as Wangen and Aubertin families

== See also ==
- List of castles and châteaux in Belgium
- Culture of Belgium
- Belgium in the long nineteenth century
