= Giovanni Bianchi (physician) =

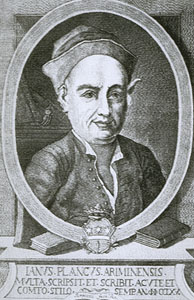
Giovanni Bianchi

Giovanni Bianchi (1693–1775), also known as Jano Planco, was an Italian physician, anatomist, archaeologist, zoologist and intellectual. He wrote numerous medical texts and De Conchis minus notis liber (1739), a work on Foraminifera, and maintained a cabinet of curiosities.

== Biography ==
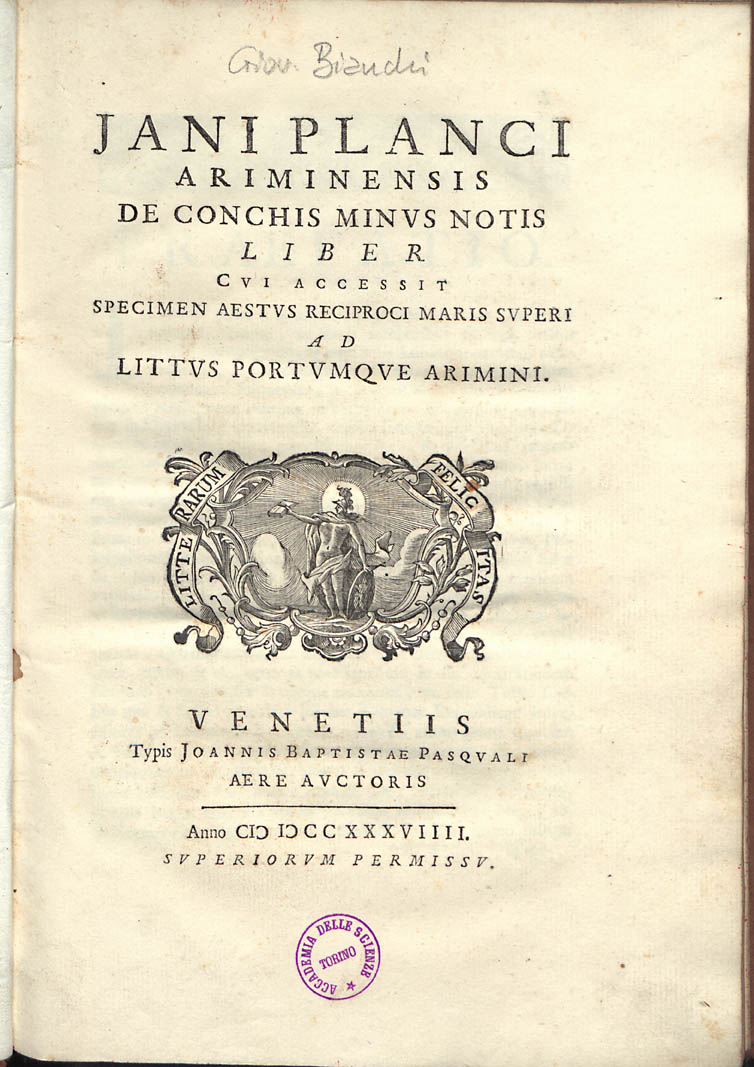
De conchis minus notis liber, 1739

Giovanni Bianchi was born in Rimini in 1693, the son of Gerolamo, a pharmacist. He studied medicine, physics and botany at the University of Bologna, graduating in 1719. He then moved to Padua and became acquainted with Giovanni Battista Morgagni and Antonio Vallisneri. He returned to Rimini, where he practised medicine for the next twenty years. He maintained a correspondence with a wide circle of cultured Italians but was not always in agreement with other members of the medical profession, preferring to put into practice his own research results rather than relying on traditional methods.

He was appointed Professor of Human Anatomy at the University of Siena in 1741 but resigned three years later because of ongoing conflict with other academics. Returning to Rimini, where he was held in high esteem and nominated as a "noble citizen" by the municipal authorities, he became director of a private academy in which students studied medicine, logic, geometry and Greek.

He published an autobiography in Latin in 1742 in which he described himself as a child prodigy, dedicated to his studies and gifted with exceptional skills; the work was written anonymously as if by someone else. He had great talents as a doctor and a relationship with a number of important scientists and scholars, resulting in considerable fame, both in Italy and abroad.

Bianchi had interests in many fields and was an ardent collector. He amassed a personal museum of archaeological, botanical and zoological specimens. He was a member of various academies and scientific societies and published many medical papers. In 1739, he published De Conchis minus notis liber, a work about the foraminifera, single-celled tiny organisms with shells.

He is buried in the church of Sant'Agostino in Rimini. A monumental plaque bears the Latin inscription Nascitur infelix, vixit infelicior, obiit infelicissime (He was born unhappy, he lived more unhappy, he died maximally unhappy).

== Works ==
- De conchis minus notis liber (in Latin). Venezia: Giovanni Battista Pasquali. 1739.
