= Gustave Saintenoy =

Belgian architect (1832–1892)

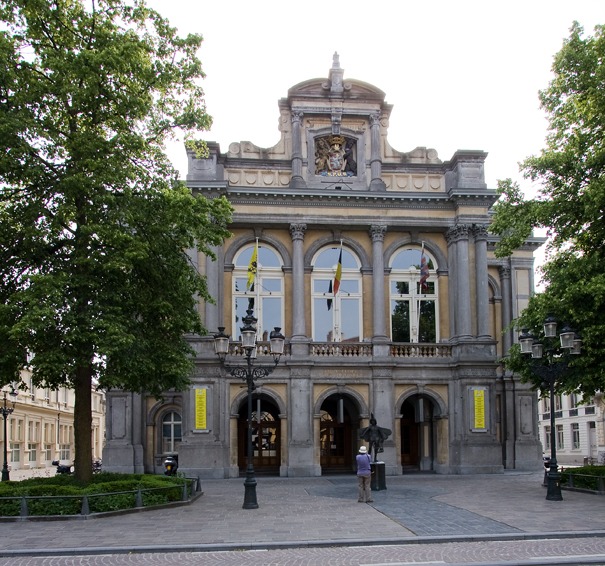
Opera house in Bruges

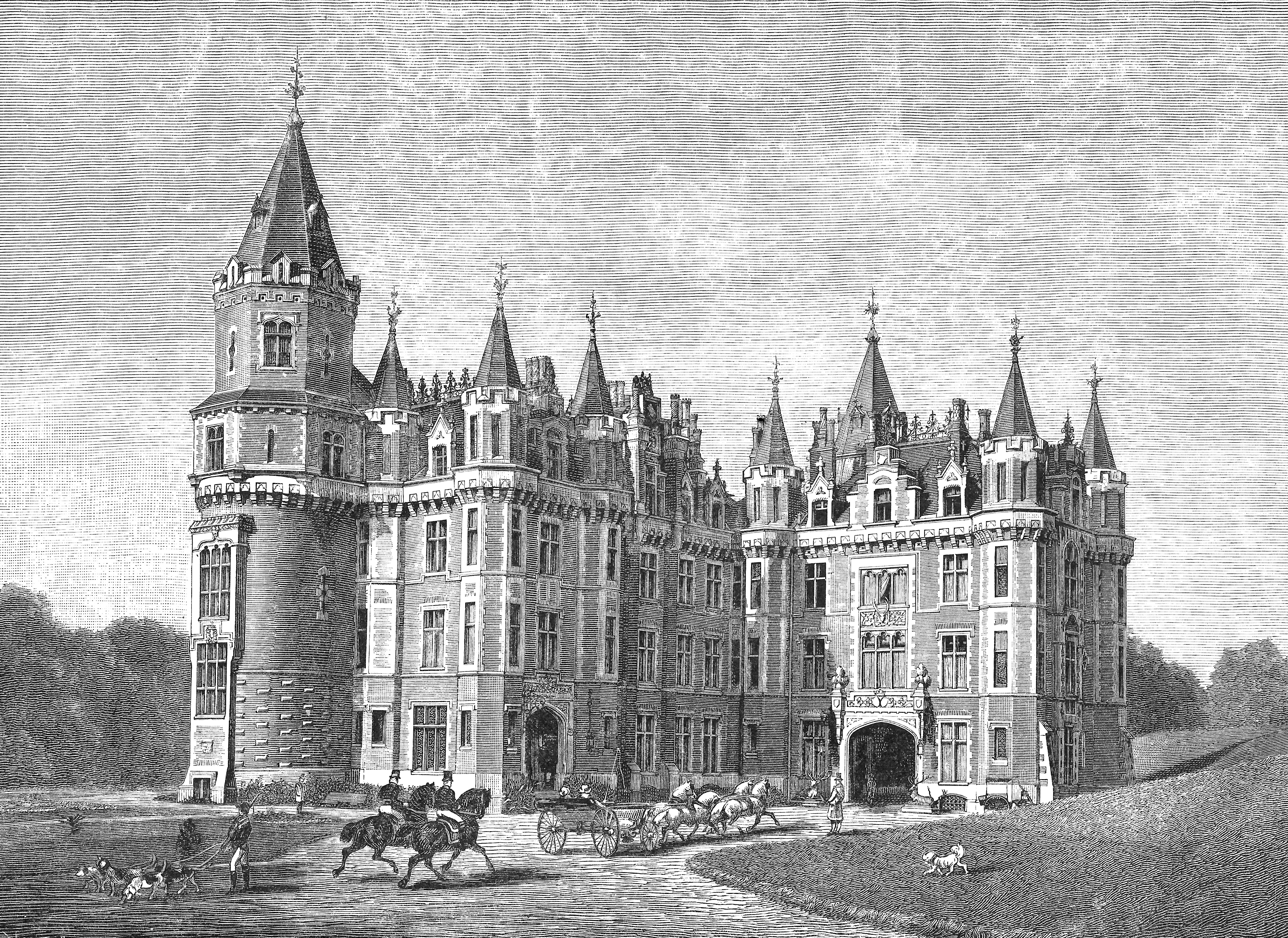
The Royal Castle of Amerois

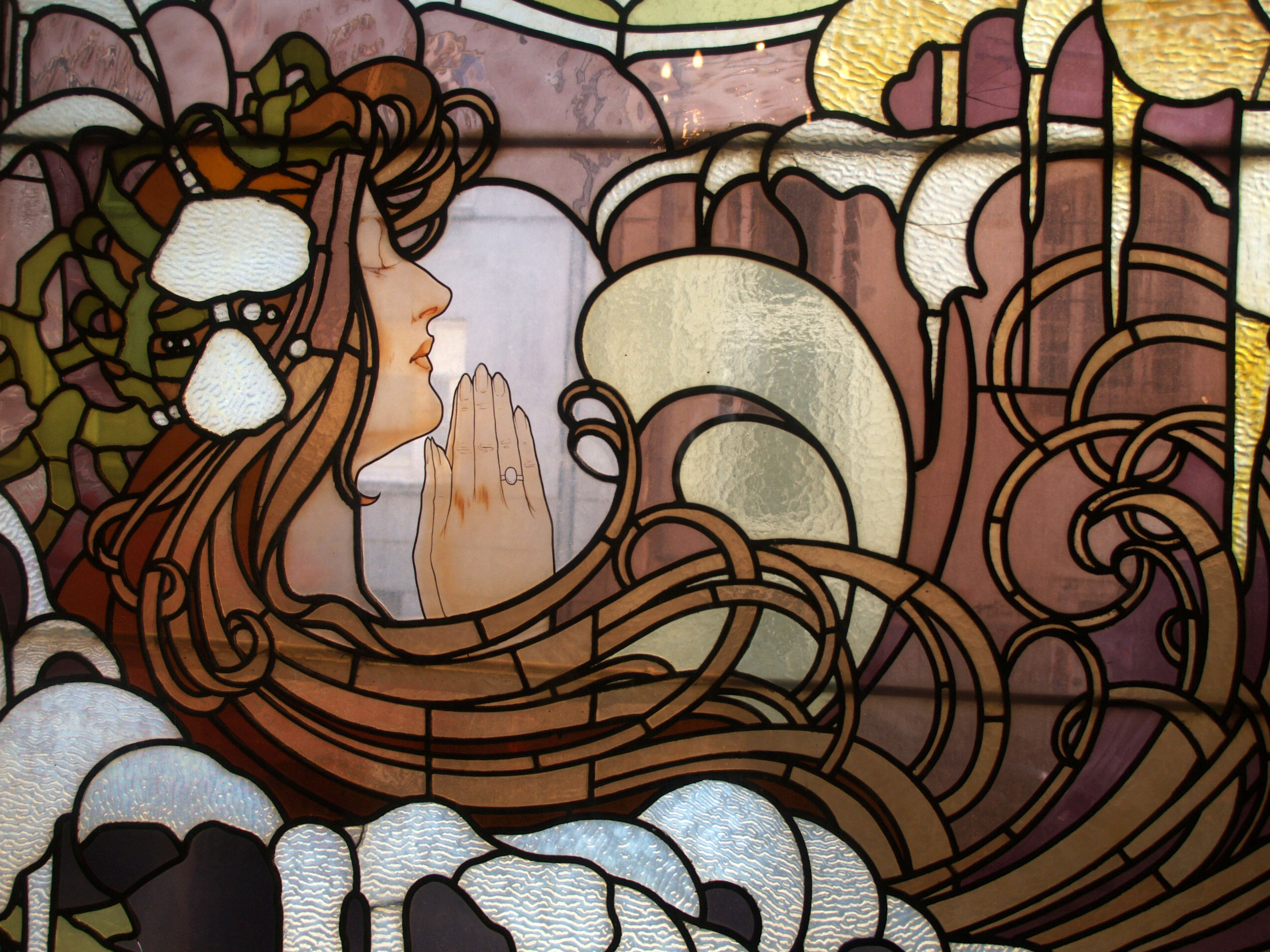
Stained glass window of woman with distinctive nose, "La Vague", in the Hotel Saintenoy, Brussels

Gustave Jean-Jacques Saintenoy (French pronunciation: [ɡystav ʒɑ̃ ʒak sɛ̃t(ə)nwa]; (6 February 1832 – 17 January 1892) was a Belgian architect.

== Family ==
Saintenoy was born in Brussels on 6 February 1832. He married into the Cluysenaar family of architects. In 1861, he married Adèle-Clothilde Cluysenaar (born 31 August 1834, died 15 August 1901). They had one son born in 1862 named Paul, who also became a famous architect.

He died in Schaerbeek on 17 January 1892. After his death, he was buried in Schaerbeek Cemetery.

== Architect ==
He was a student at the Royal Academy of Fine Arts in Brussels. In 1866, he became the titular architect of the Count of Flanders. He built important buildings in royal command such as the Palace of the Count of Flanders and the Royal castle of Amerois.

== Work ==
- Brussels-Luxembourg railway station
- Palace of the Count of Flanders, Brussels
- Royal City Theater, Bruges.
- Chateau des Amerois
