= Marquess of Assche =

Title belonging to the Belgian nobility

The Coat of the House of van der Noot.

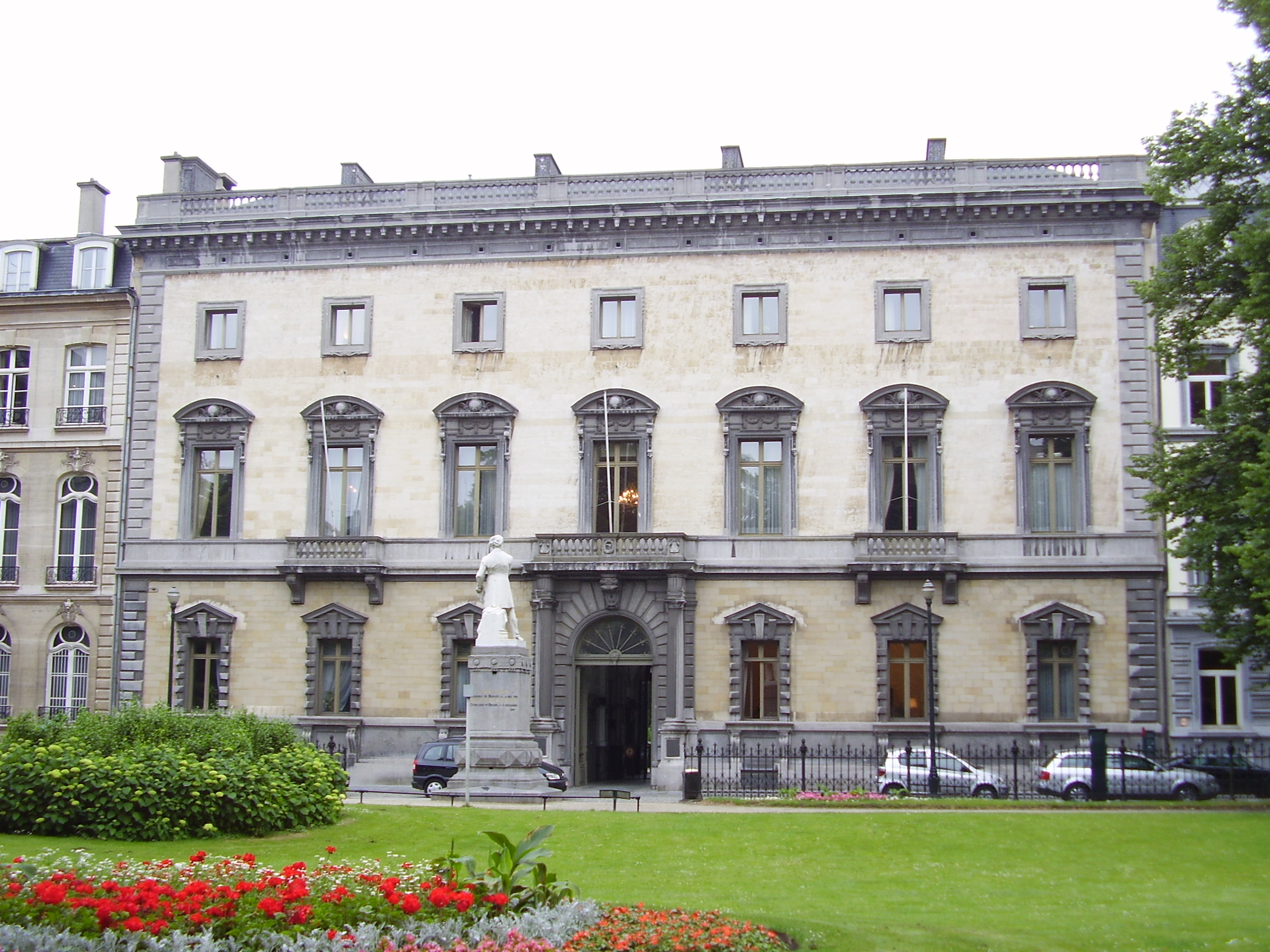
The palace of the Marquess of Assche, in Brussels, by architect Alphonse Balat, originally a private residence, since 1948 seat of a superior court: the Belgian Council of State

Marquess of Assche is a title belonging to the Belgian nobility, Assche is the old writing of the city of Asse. The Margraveships still stands today and belongs to the House van der Noot. Today the current Marquess of Assche still resides in Belgium.

== History ==
The first Marquess of Assche was created in 1633 for the House of Cottereau, a family of French origin and belonged to the high nobility of the Duchy of Brabant. First of the line was Guillaume I de Cottereau, 1st Marquess of Assche, Baron of Jauche, Lord of Assche and Lord of Puisieux. His father John II of Cottereau, Baron of Jauche was the lord Mayor of Brussels and married to Margueritte of Wideux, Lady of Assche. He was followed by Henri François. The house of Cottereau kept the Margraveship for several generations until it changed to the family van der Noot, after the death of Marie Taye. The Marquess of Assche lived in Steenockerzeel Castle.

== List of Marquess of Assche ==
=== House of Cottereau ===
1. Guillaume I de Cottereau, 1st Marquess of Assche, (1560-1620).
2. Henri Francois de Cottereau, 2nd Marquess of Assche, died without issue.
3. Guillaume II de Cottereau, 3rd Marquess of Assche, (1615-1689).
4. John IV de Cottereau, 4th Marquess of Assche, (1670-1725).
5. Catherine Louise de Cottereau, 5th Marquess of Assche, (1705-1765) married to François Philippe Taye, Marquess of Wemmel.
6. Marie Josepha Taye, 6th Marquess of Assche, (1740-1820), Marquess of Wemmel she was married to count Jean-Antoine van der Noot.

=== House of van der Noot ===
1. Maximiliaan Lodewijk van der Noot, (1764 - 1847) 7th Marquess of Assche and baron of Schoonhoven. died 18 March 1847.
  1. Theodore van der Noot, 8th Marquess of Assche
2. Charles-Antoine van der Noot
3. Edouard Dimitri van der Noot (1860 - 1928), 9th Marquess of Assche.
4. Henri van der Noot, Marquess of Assche (1902-1952), marr. to Colette Allard.
5. Wauthier van der Noot, Marquess of Assche.
6. Henri II van der Noot, Marquess of Assche.

== Other ==
- Elisabeth van der Noot d'Assche, daughter of Edouard Dimitri.
