= 2017 Medborgarplatsen stabbing =

Stabbing incident in Sweden

- Location: Medborgarplatsen square in Stockholm, Sweden
- Date: 31 August 2017
- Weapon: knife
- Victim: 1 policeman injured
- Perpetrator: Muhammad Hussaini
- Motive: Wanting a residence permit in Sweden
- Verdict: Attempted murder 2 counts of assault
- Convictions: 5 years in prison, deportation

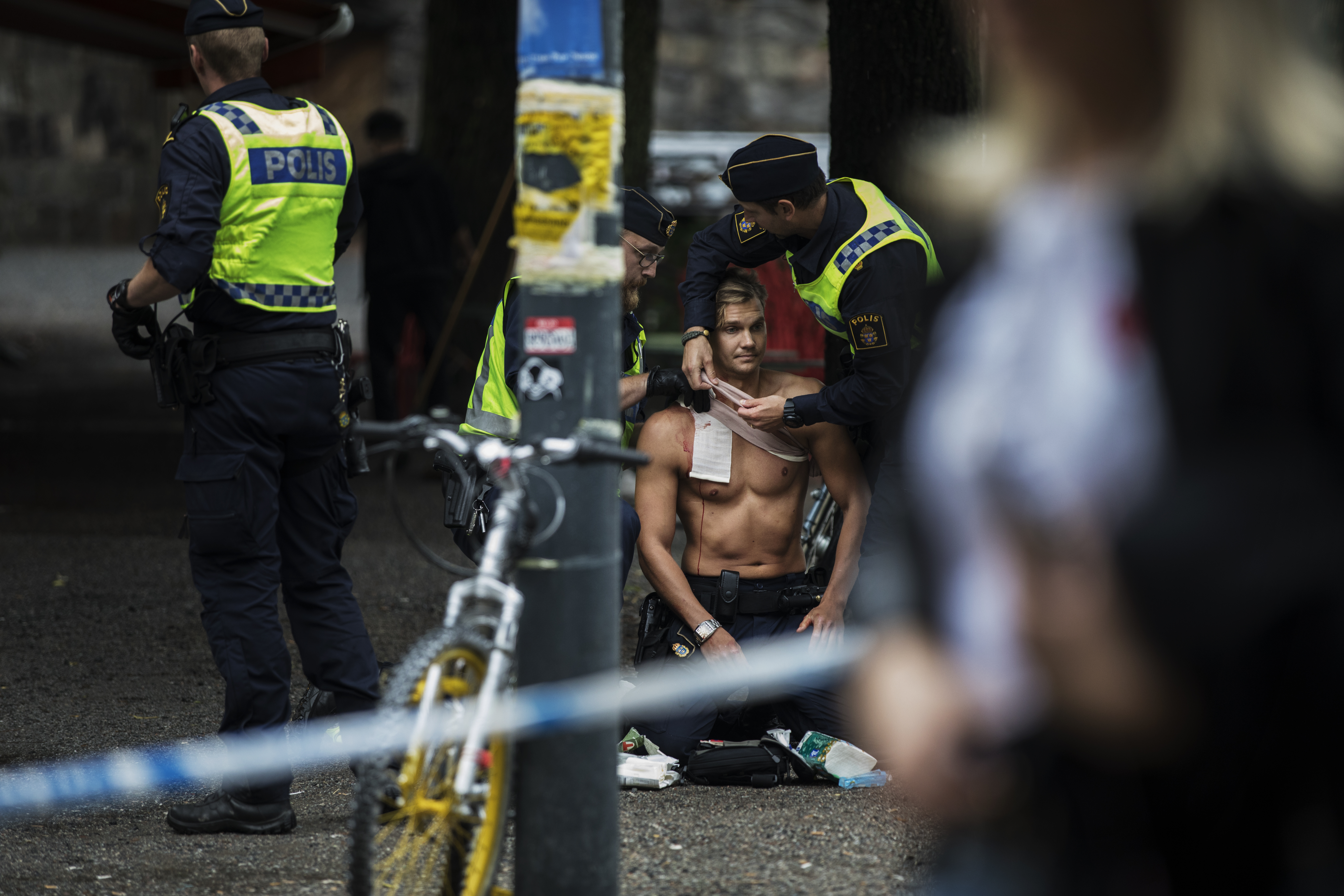
Photo: Lisa Mattisson

On 31 August 2017, policeman Ted Eriksson and his colleague patrolled the area around Medborgarplatsen and Björns trädgård in Stockholm in conjunction with a sit-in protest concerning deportation of Afghan migrants from Sweden. The perpetrator, who had previously taken part in the protest, unprovokedly stabbed Eriksson in the neck from behind, the seriousness of the attack didn't cause any fatal injuries despite the spinal cord was punctured and the vertebra was fractured.

An Afghan asylum seeker named Muhammad Hussaini who had arrived during 2015 was arrested shortly thereafter by Eriksson's colleague on suspicion of attempted murder.

A forensic psychiatrist found that Muhammad Hussaini did not commit the attack affected by any psychiatric illness, as the perpetrator had hoped the attack was proof that he was mentally ill and therefore be more likely to receive a residence permit. Muhammad Hussaini had also hoped that psychiatric illness would lead to him being acquitted at the trial.

Muhammad Hussaini had applied for asylum as an unaccompanied minor while claiming to be 16 years old (born 17 December 1999) in December 2015, but crime investigators concluded his true age to be about 22–23 years old that he had faked his mental illness. The perpetrator's real age, 25 years old was found out by a journalist from Expressen days after the trial.

On 29 March 2018, Muhammad Hussaini was found guilty of attempted murder by the Stockholm District Court and sentenced to 5 years in prison with subsequent deportation. Policeman Eriksson was awarded 125 000 SEK in damages. The Afghan was also found guilty of two counts of assault at a secondary schools a few days before the Medborgarplatsen attack.
