= Medborgarplatsen metro station =

Stockholm Metro station

Medborgarplatsen
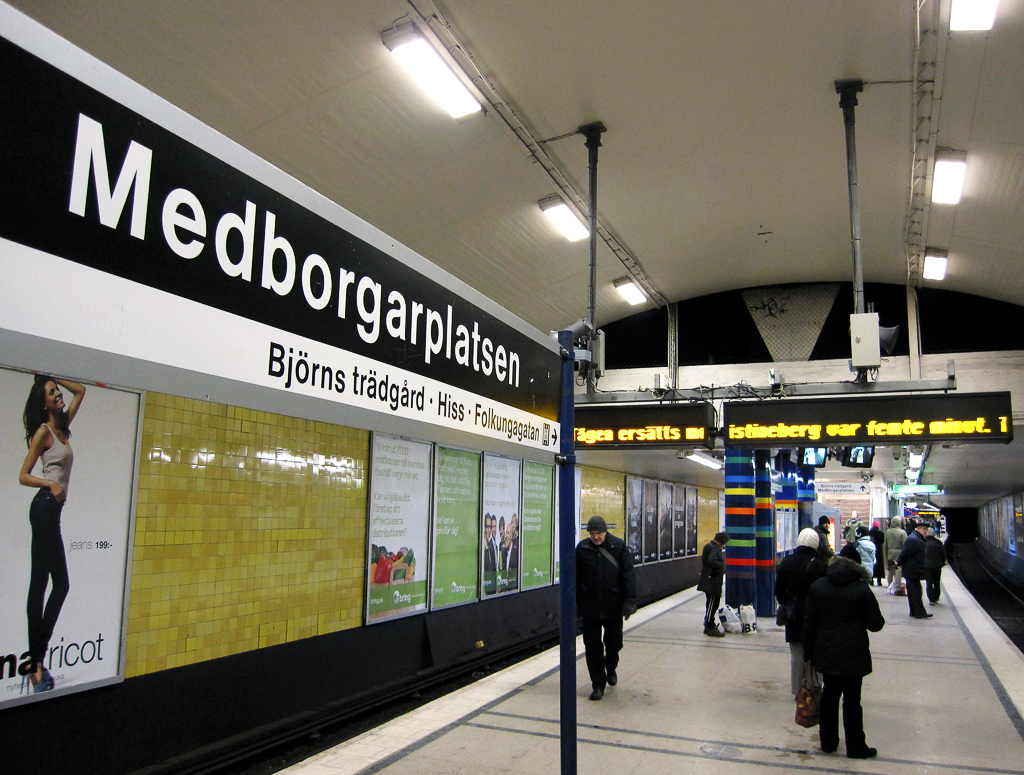
- Station platform, 2010

General information
- Coordinates: 59°18′53″N 18°4′19″E
- System: Stockholm Metro station
- Owner: Storstockholms Lokaltrafik
- Platforms: 1 island platform
- Tracks: 2

Construction
- Structure type: Underground
- Depth: 6–18 m (20–59 ft)
- Accessible: Yes

Other information
- Station code: MBP

History
- Opened: 1 October 1933; 93 years ago
- Rebuilt: 1 October 1950

Passengers
- 2019: 26,750 boarding per weekday

Services
Preceding station	Stockholm Metro	Following station
Slussen towards Åkeshov	Line 17	Skanstull towards Skarpnäck
Slussen towards Alvik	Line 18	Skanstull towards Farsta strand
Slussen towards Hässelby strand	Line 19	Skanstull towards Hagsätra
Location
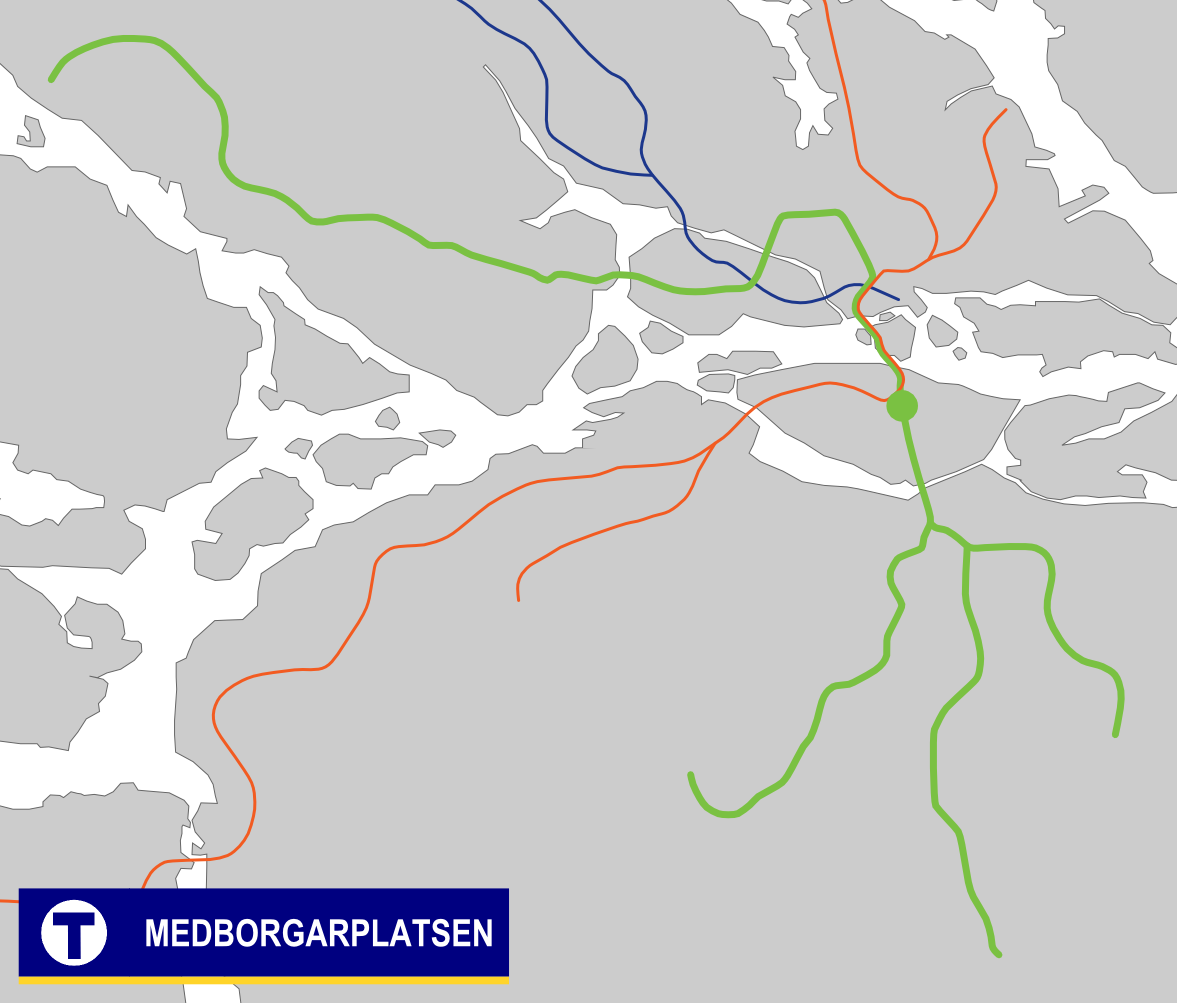

Medborgarplatsen is a station on the Green Line of the Stockholm Metro. It is situated near to the Medborgarplatsen square on the island of Södermalm in Stockholm City, Sweden. It is 0.6 km (0.37 mi) from Slussen.

== History ==
Medborgarplatsen is, along with Skanstull, the oldest underground station on the metro, actually predating that system by some years. The station lies in the Södertunneln, a tunnel originally built in 1933 for use by routes 8 and 19 of the Stockholm tramway, and had an entrance in Götgatan. Originally known as Södra Bantorget, the station took its current name in 1944.

In 1950, Medborgarplatsen became part of Stockholm's first metro line when the Södertunneln was adapted to become part of the line from Slussen south to Hökarängen. This required an extension of the station platforms to the north to accommodate the metro's trains, and this work was not completed when the line opened on 1 October, with the station not reopening until 1 November.

An additional entrance in Björns trädgård was opened on 29 November 1995.

== Operation ==
The station lies below Götgatan between its junctions with Noe Arksgränden and Folkungagatan, and has two tracks and a single, rather narrow, island platform. The are two ticket halls, which are both at basement level, one giving access to the south end of the platform whist the other is at its mid-length.

The middle entrance has a street level access in a pavilion in the Björns trädgård, whch provides stair, escalator and lift access to the booking hall. There is similar access from there to the platform. The southern ticket hall lies under the junction of Götgatan with Folkungagatan, and has street level entrances, via stairs, on both sides of Götgatan. There is further stair access to the platform from the ticket hall, and this entrance has no lifts.

== Art ==
The walls of the station have yellow tiles, partly original from the 1930s. As part of Art in the Stockholm Metro project, Gunnar Söderström designed the color scheme of the pillars and walls in 1979. In the southern ticket hall there is a wall decoration and floor mosaic by Mari Pårup from 1997.

== Gallery ==
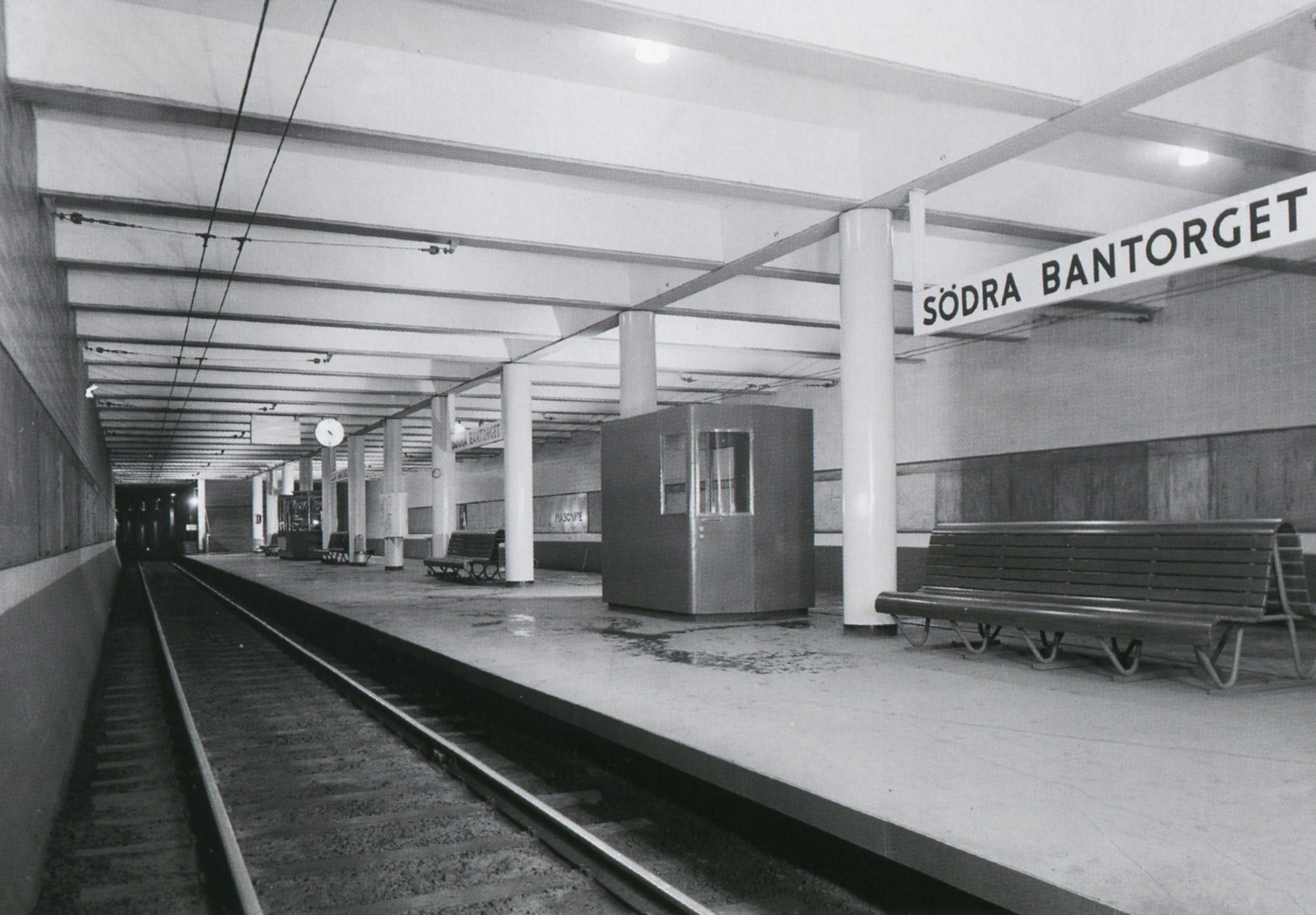
Södra Bantorget tram station, 1930s

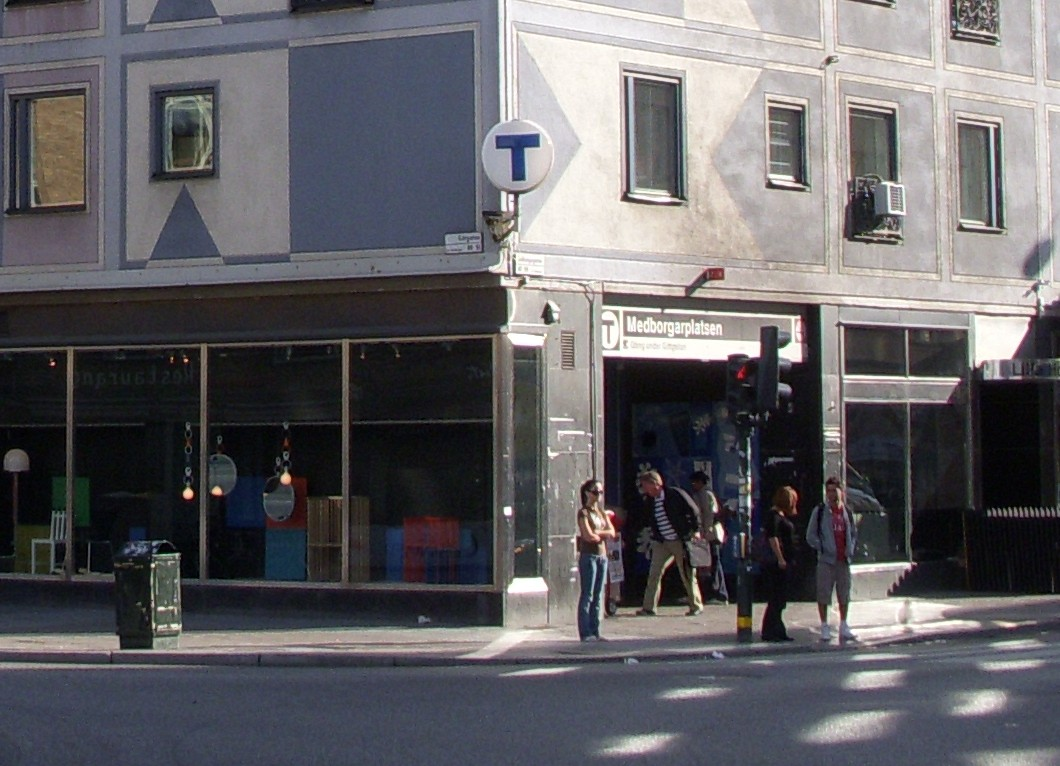
Entrance on Folkungagatan, 2009

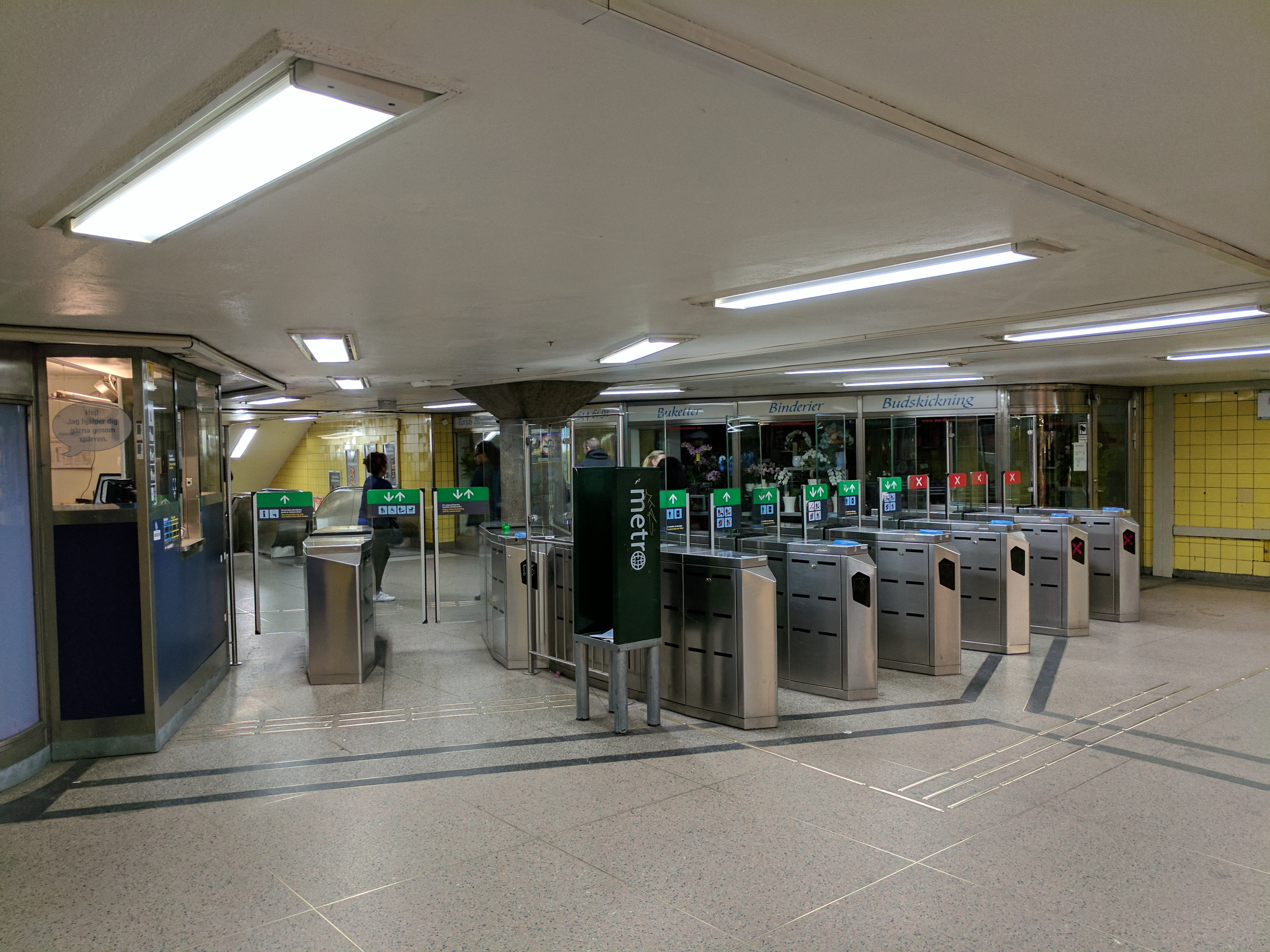
Ticket hall, 2017

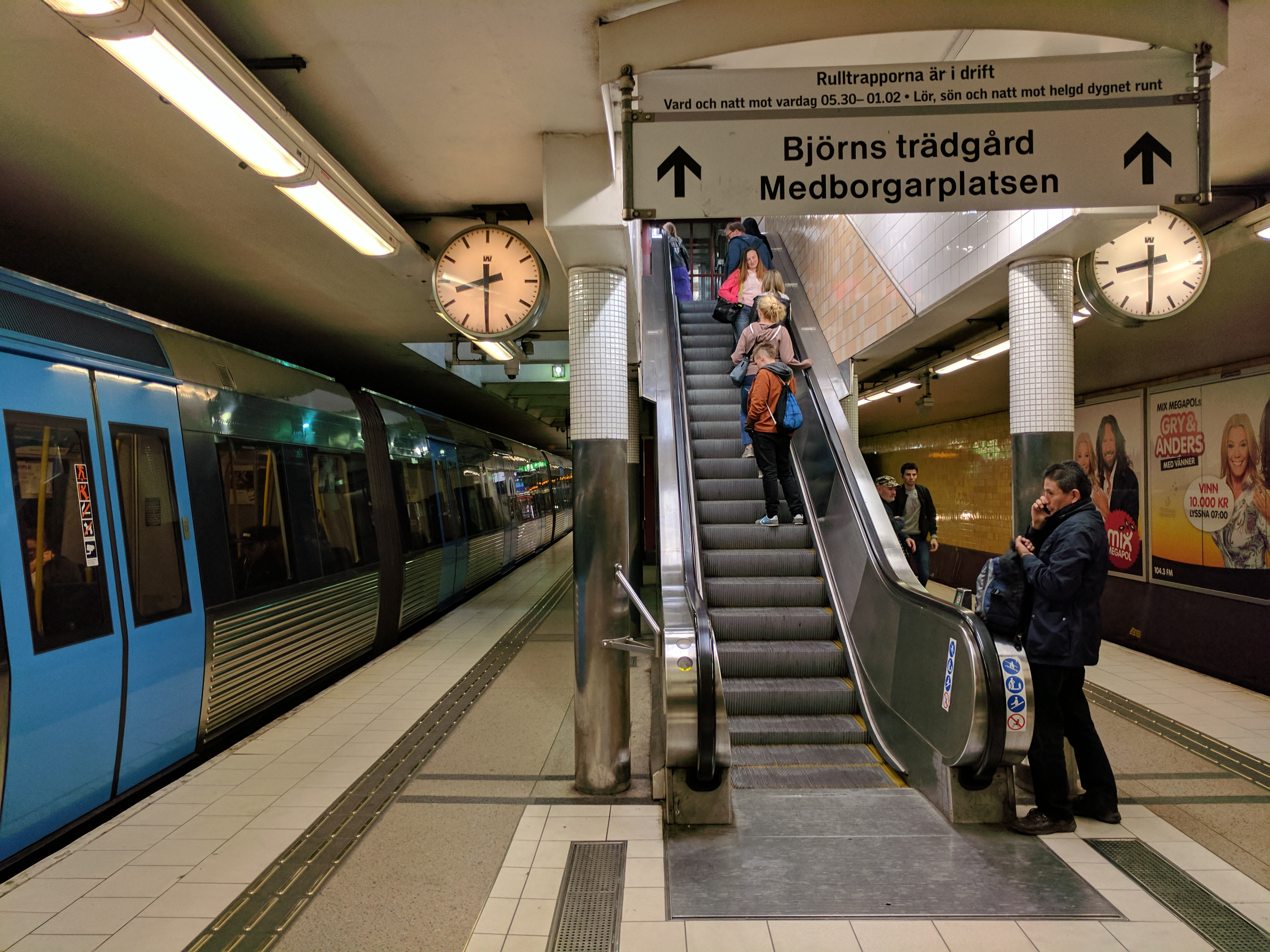
Exit to Björns trädgård, 2017

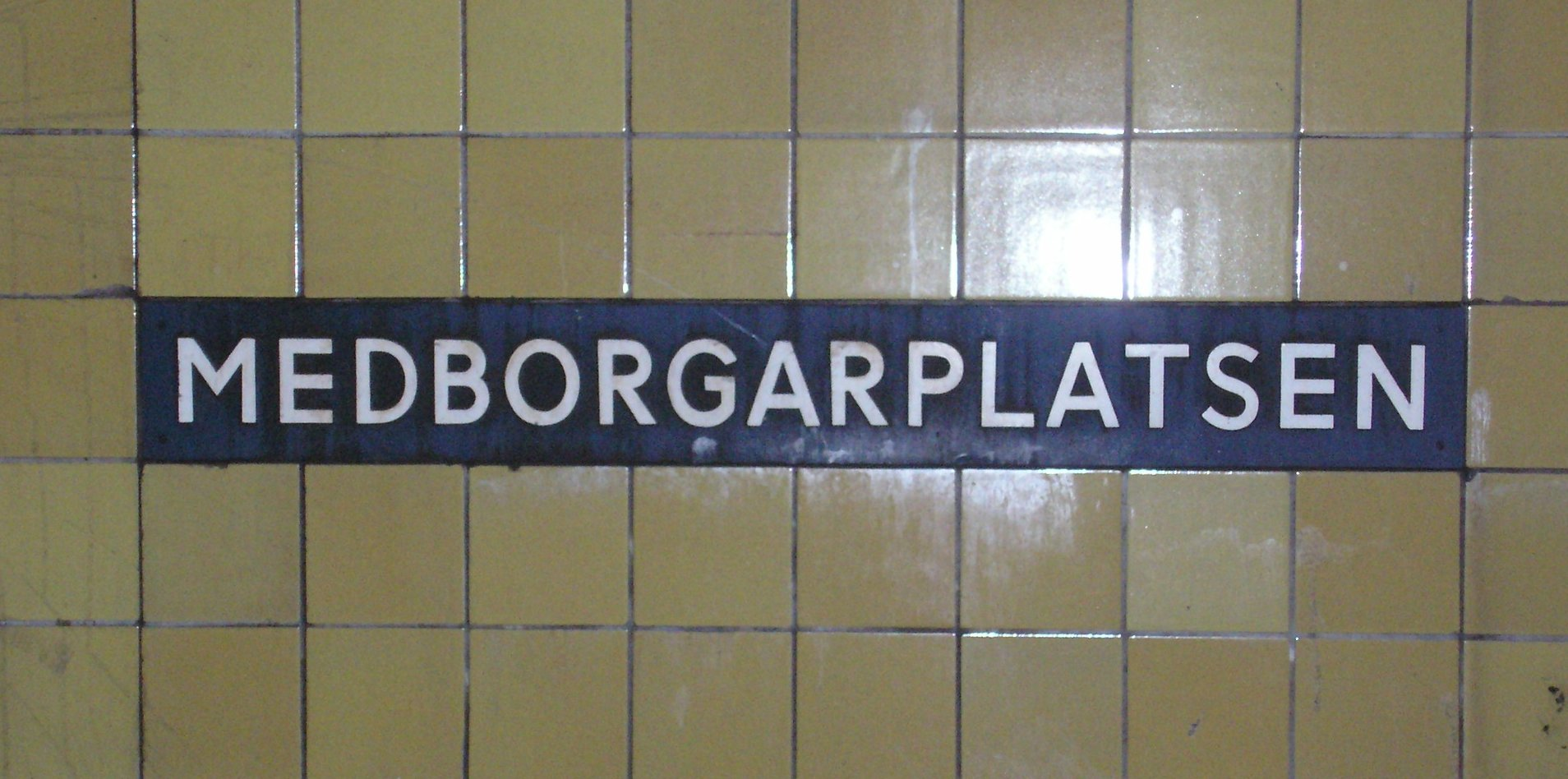
Station tiles, 1954
