= Södertunneln =

Metro tunnel in Stockholm, Sweden

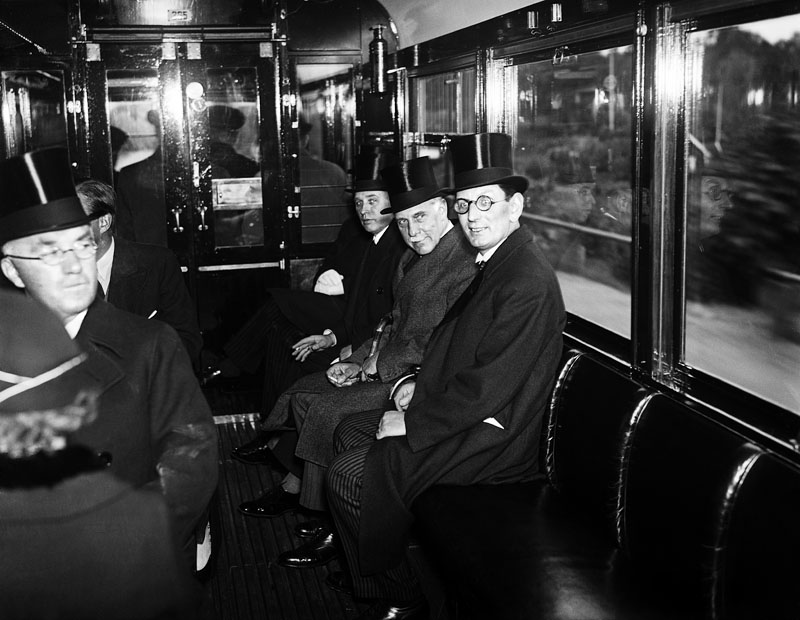
Inauguration tour in 1933; City Commissioner Yngve Larsson on the right.

Södertunneln, also called the Katarina Tunnel, is a tunnel from Skanstull to Slussen on Södermalm in Stockholm, inaugurated on 30 September 1933. It is a part of the Stockholm Metro's Green Line. Södertunneln was the first urban rail tunnel in Stockholm and paved the way for the later expansion of the Metro.

== History ==
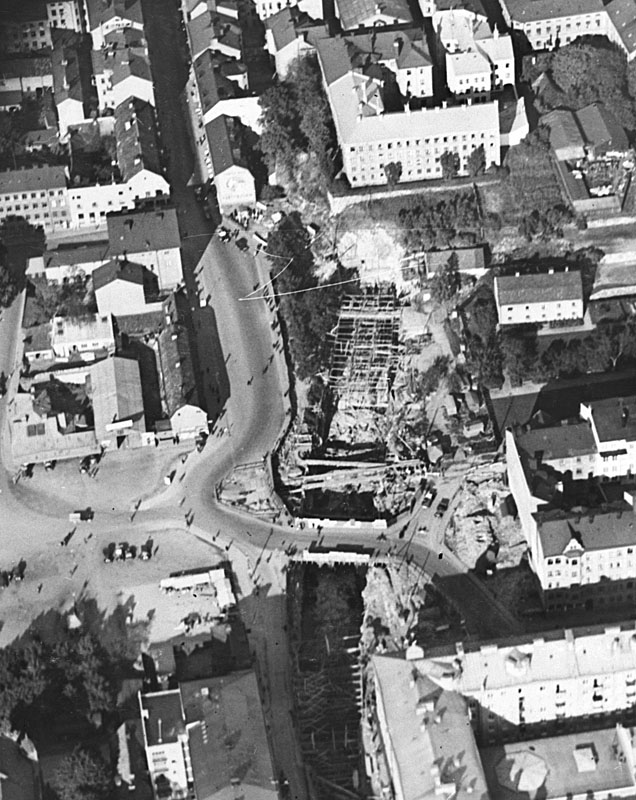
Södertunneln at Södra Bantorget under construction in open cut, 1932.

In 1920, a proposal was made to put the traffic from the Enskedebanan into a tunnel, as it had been realized that the increasingly dense tram traffic on the streets was problematic. Throughout the 1920s, investigations were carried out. When the Örbybanan opened in 1930, the situation became even more urgent, and the 1930 Traffic Committee was formed under the leadership of City Commissioner Yngve Larsson. The committee presented its report on Södertunneln on 5 February 1931, and on 30 March, the Stockholm City Council decided to carry out the projects. The cost of the tunnel was estimated at 4.5 million krons.

Construction began in 1931, and the construction caused traffic problems on Götgatan, especially for tram traffic, which had to be diverted.

The new infrastructure –in a premetro fashion– had three stations: Slussen, with a turning loop, Södra Bantorget and Ringvägen, the latter two now renamed "Medborgarplatsen" and "Skanstull," respectively. The stations had 60-meter-long platforms, but from the beginning, it was planned for a full-scale metro with 100-meter platforms. The artist Kalle Lodén was responsible for the signage and color schemes of the stations. The metro also had an advanced signalling system for the time to allow for frequent traffic. On 30 September 1933, the inauguration ceremony took place with City Commissioner Yngve Larsson, and Stockholm had its first underground.

In 1941, it was decided that Södertunneln, along with the connecting Interurban tram lines, would be converted to full metro standard, and in the mid-1940s, work began to adapt the suburb sections. In 1949, it was time to rebuild Södertunneln, which became more expensive and extensive than initially anticipated, primarily because longer trains and 145-meter platforms were now planned due to the rapidly increasing traffic volume. On 1 October 1950, the metro service with the new metro trains was inaugurated (with a design that closely resembles the older cars still in use on the Stockholm metro). On 24 November 1957, the southern metro was connected to the northern one, and in the early 1960s, Slussen's metro station was covered and took on its current appearance.

== Road tunnel ==
There was also a proposed road traffic tunnel named the Katarina Tunnel, which was never built. Its northern tunnel mouth was to be located at the beginning of Katarinavägen, approximately where the P-hus Slussen's entrances and exits are. Here lies Tunnelbacken, named after this road tunnel in 1925.

== Historical images ==
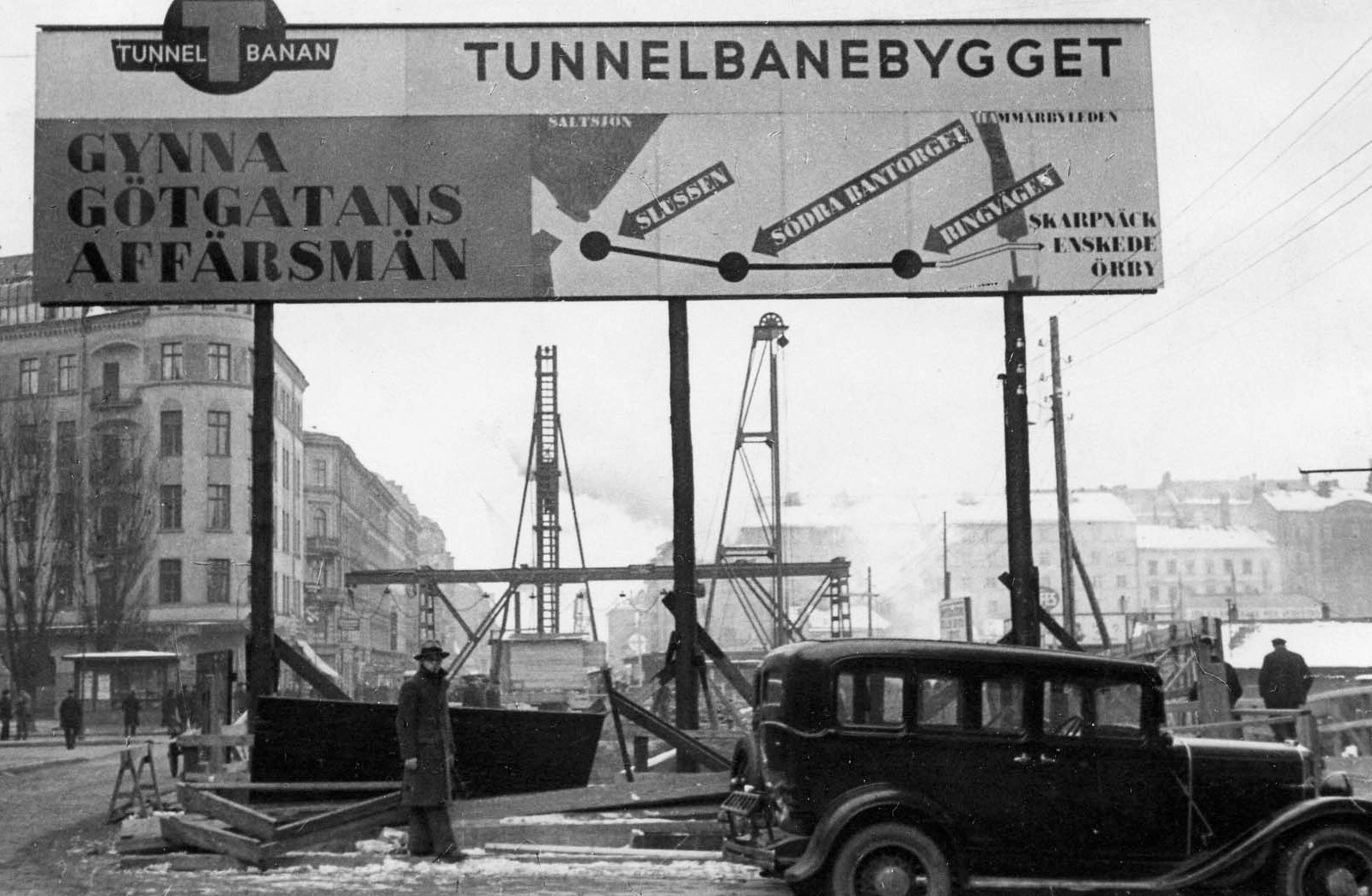
Tunnel construction on Götgatan in March 1933

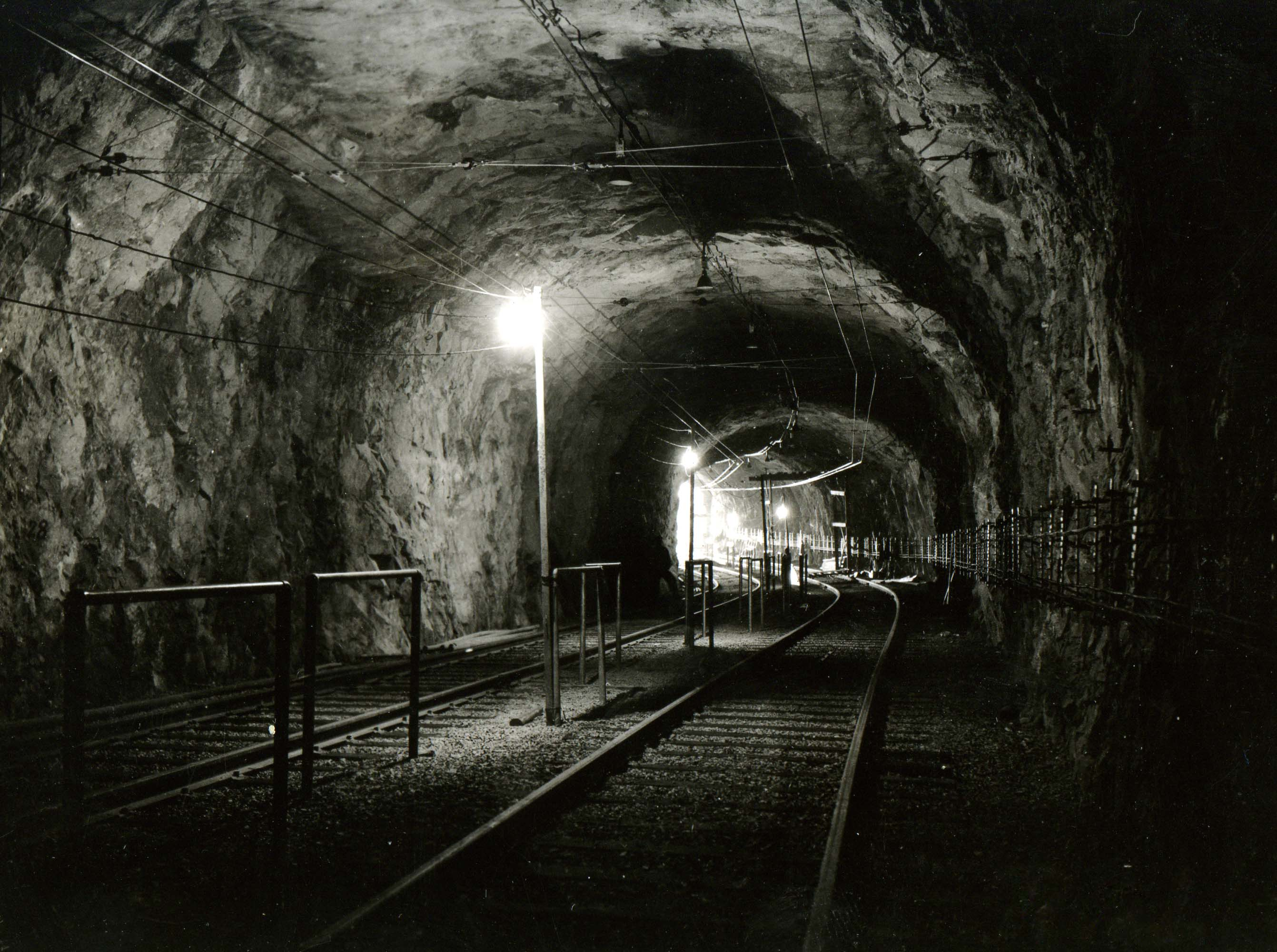
Södertunneln in 1933

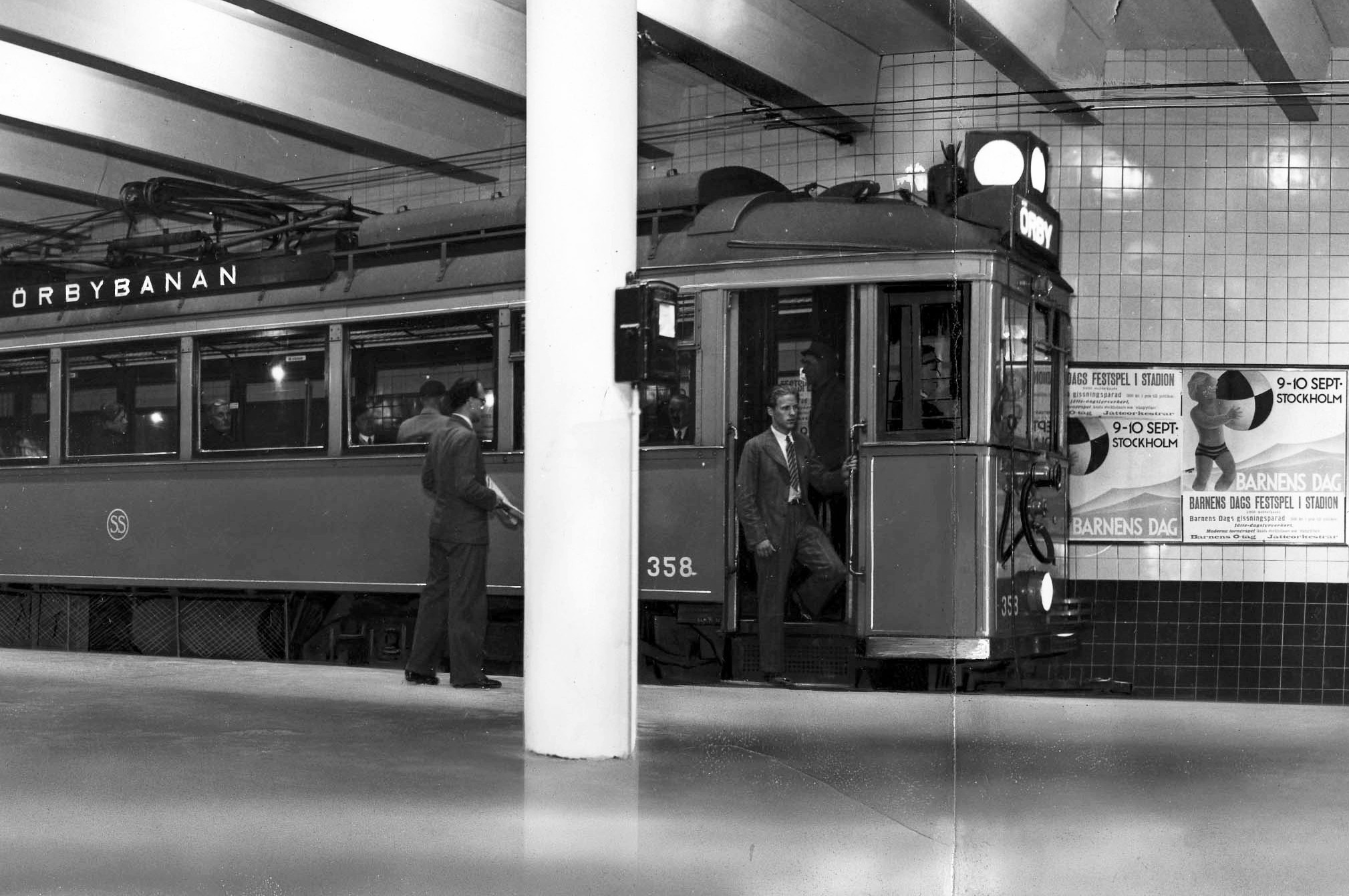
Station "Ringvägen" in September 1933

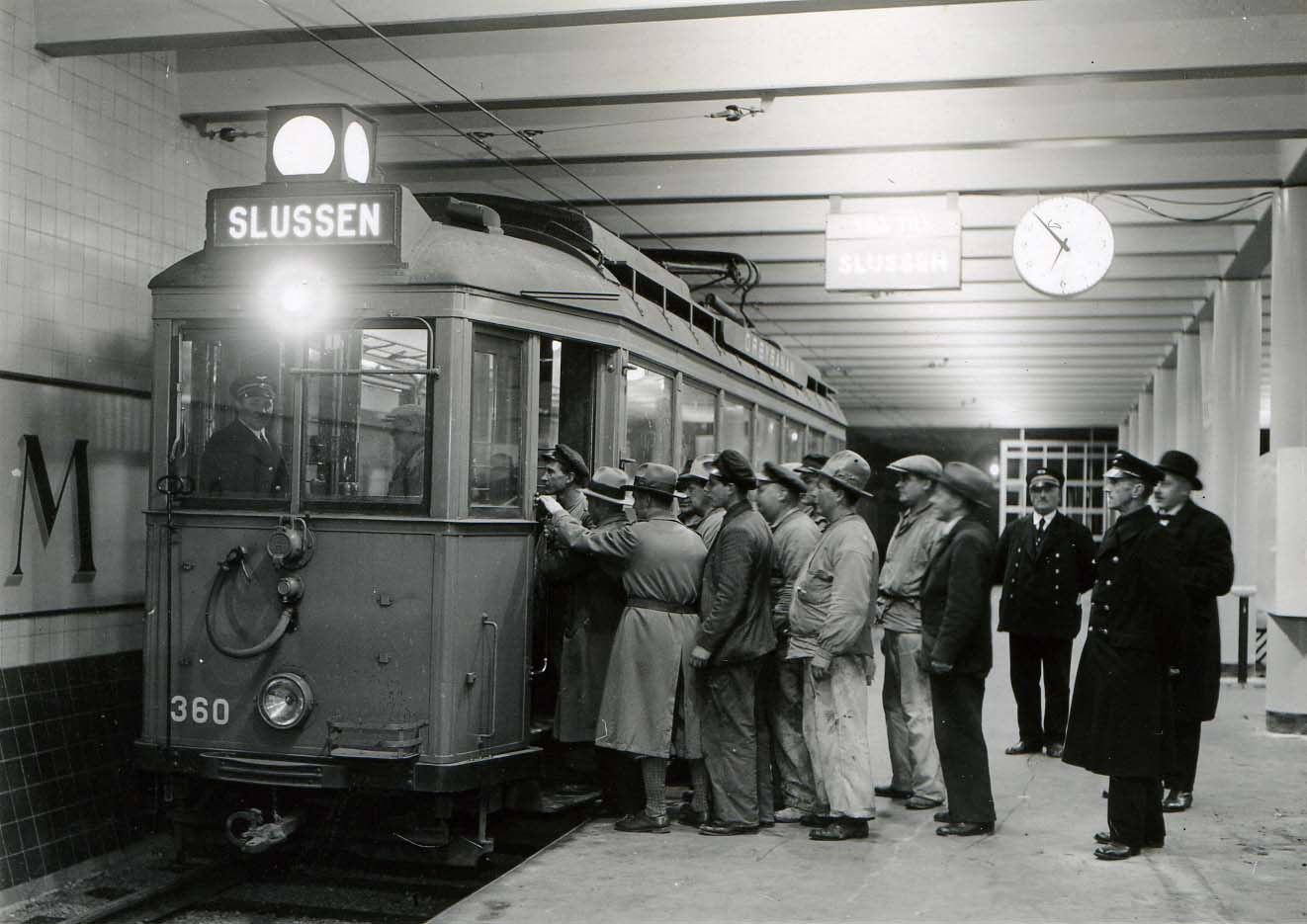
Örby Line at "Ringvägen" in 1933

== See also ==
- Stockholm metro

== Bibliography ==
- Friman, Helena (2008). Stockholm: en historia i kartor och bilder. Stockholm: Wahlström & Widstrand. ISBN 978-91-46-21843-2.
- Larsson, Yngve (1977). Mitt liv i stadshuset. Stockholm: Stockholms kommunalförvaltning. p. 474. ISBN 978-91-85676-00-2.
- Tunnelbanan Skanstull-Slussen: beskrivning utgiven i anledning av tunnelbanans invigning den 30 september 1933. Stockholm: Text & bild. 1982. ISBN 978-91-86178-01-7.
