= Den gröne Jägaren =

Bar & restaurant in Stockholm

Coordinates: 59°18′48″N 18°4′25″E

Den gröne Jägaren (meaning "The Green Hunter") is a bar and restaurant at Götgatan 64 in Södermalm, Stockholm, Sweden.

== History ==
It began at a small tavern in the 1600s at Sankt Paulsgatan, near Van der Nootska Palace. It is said that Jacob Johan Anckarström ate his dinner at the Den gröne Jägaren on March 16, 1792, before he went to the Gustavian Opera House to shoot the king Gustav III.

Today's restaurant is located on the ground floor of Hellgrenska Palace and was built in 1866. On the façade there is the classic flag sign with a green clad hunter with his gun. The building previously housed the nobleman's apartments, where Oscar II also drank. For many years the restaurant Norma was located in the premises. The facade now features the classic flag sign showing a green-clad hunter with a gun. Den Gröne Jägaren underwent an extensive renovation in 2019.

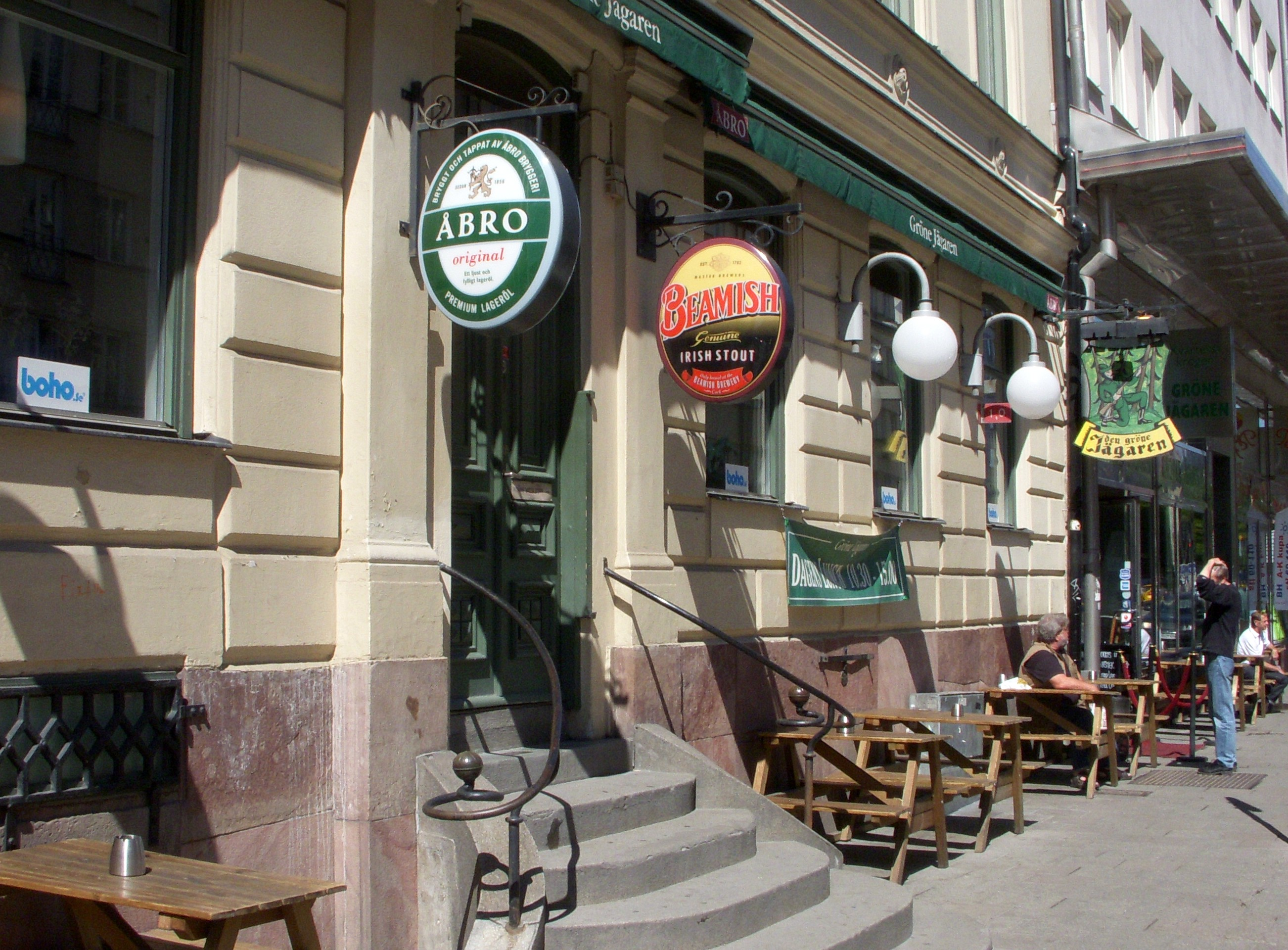

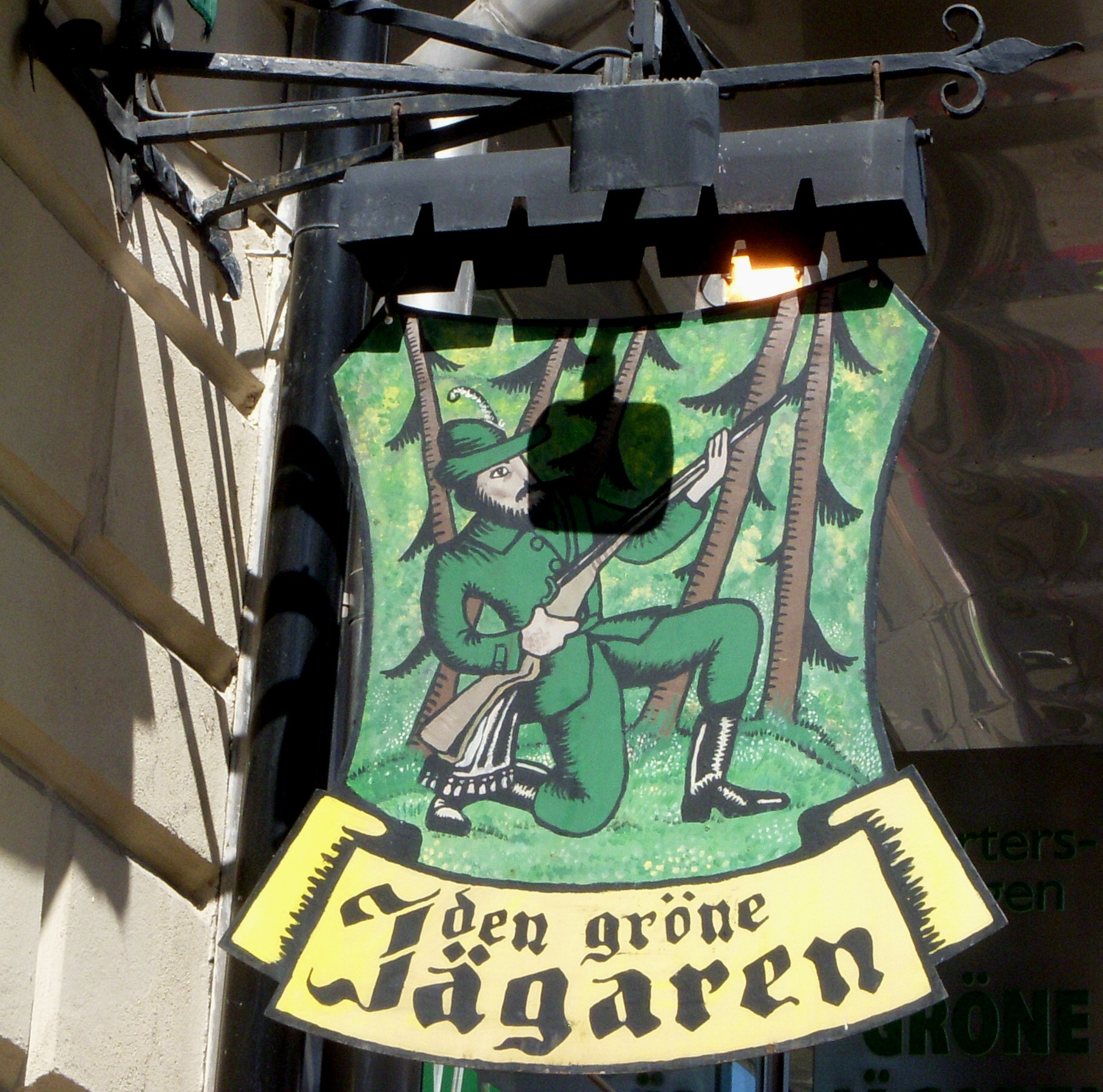

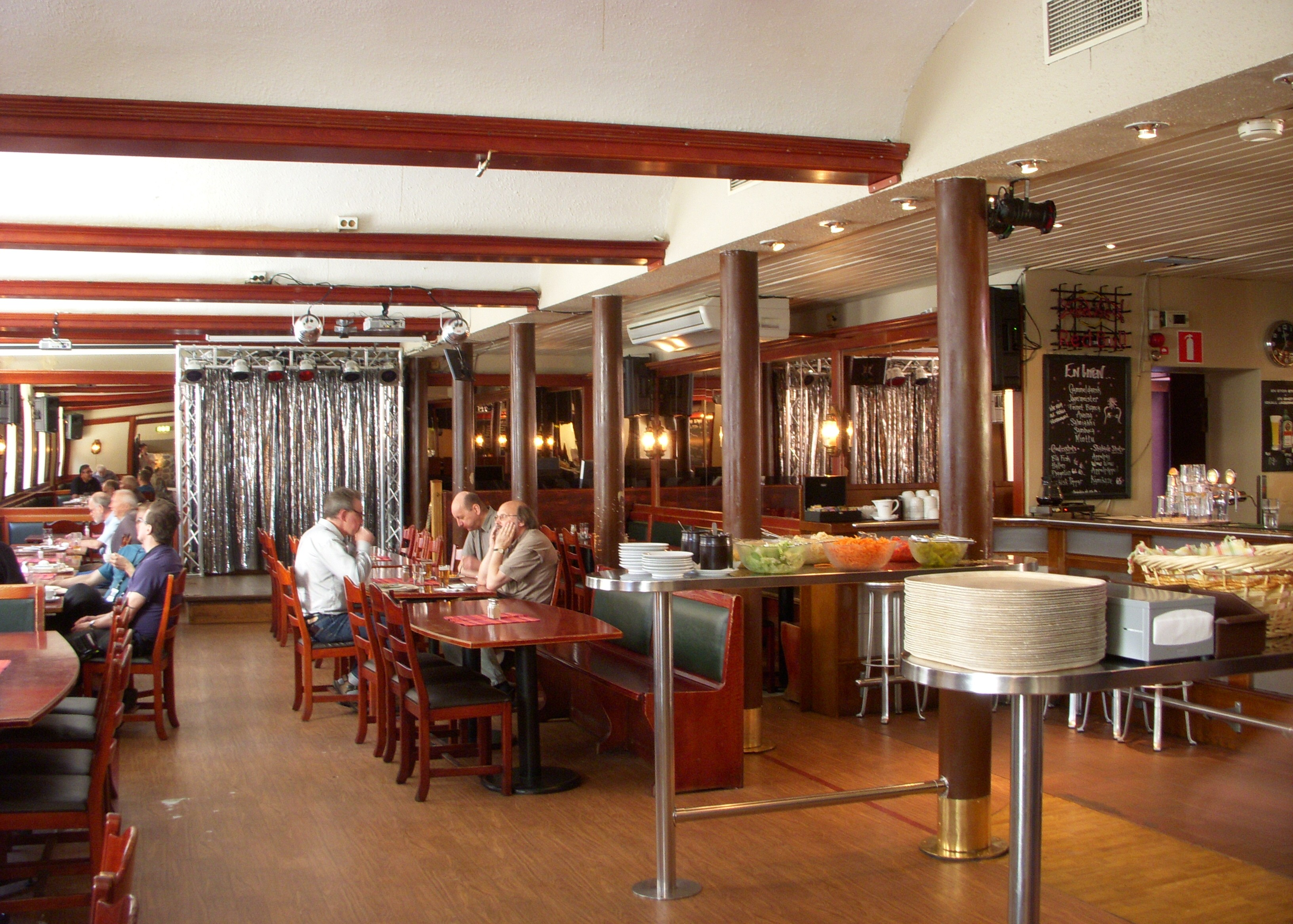
