= Jahnsson =

Jahnsson is a surname. Notable people with the surname include:

- Jean Jahnsson (1854–1944), Swedish jeweller, art collector and Consul General
- Kai Jahnsson (born 1965), Finnish sport shooter who competes in the men's 10 metre air pistol
- Sirkka Jahnsson or Sirkka Sari (1920–1939), Finnish actress
- Yrjö Jahnsson (1877–1936), Finnish economics professor at the University of Helsinki

== See also ==
- Yrjö Jahnsson Award
- Yrjö Jahnsson Foundation
- Janson
- Jansson
