= Skanstull metro station =

Stockholm Metro station

Skanstull
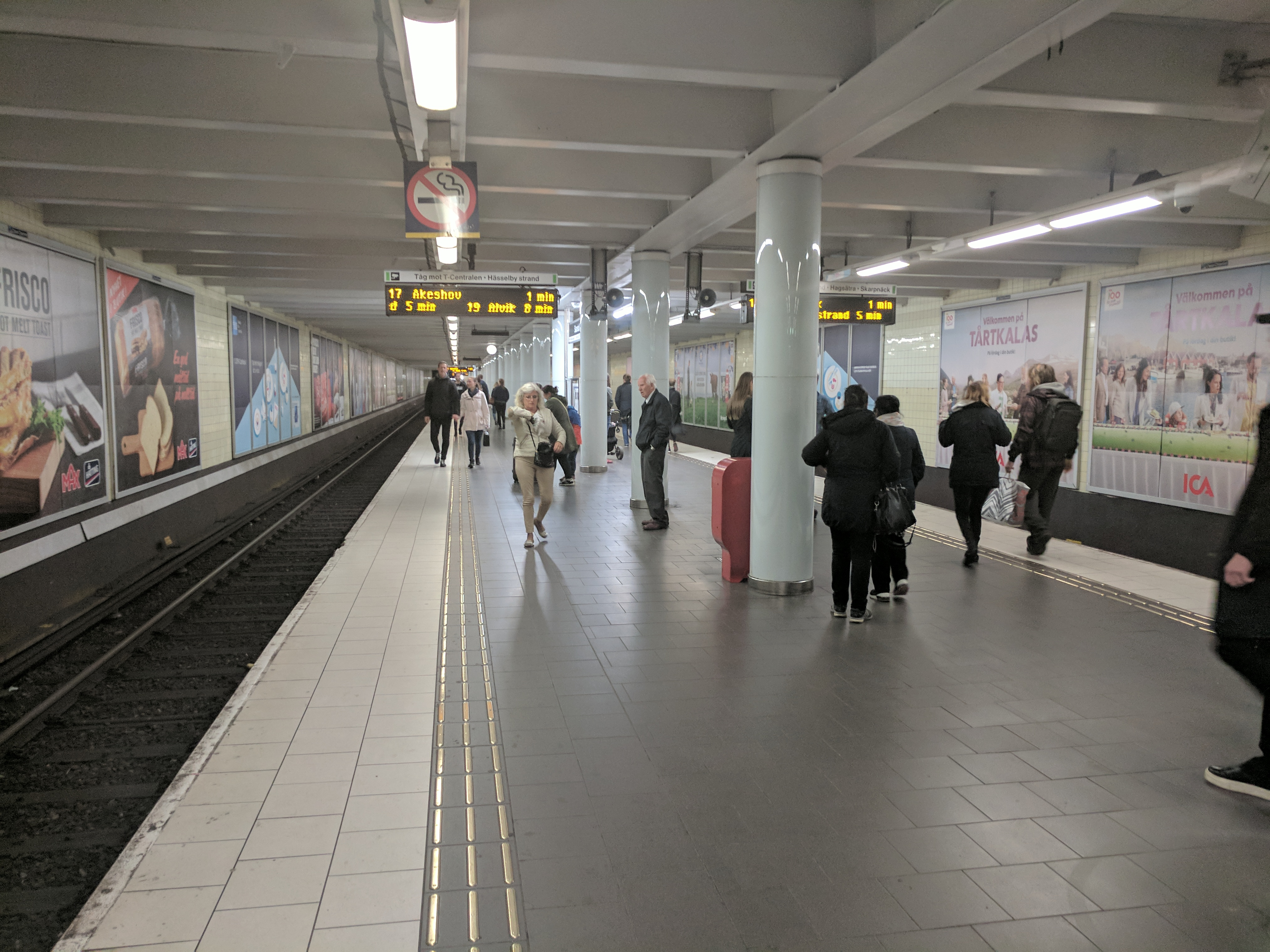
- The station platform

General information
- Coordinates: 59°18′28″N 18°04′33″E
- System: Stockholm Metro station
- Owner: Storstockholms Lokaltrafik
- Platforms: 1 island platform
- Tracks: 2

Construction
- Structure type: Underground
- Depth: 5 m (16 ft)
- Accessible: Yes

Other information
- Station code: SKT

History
- Opened: 1 October 1933; 93 years ago
- Rebuilt: 1 October 1950
- Former names: Ringvägen (1933–1950)

Passengers
- 2019: 29,950 boarding per weekday

Services
| Preceding station | Stockholm Metro | Following station |
|---|---|---|
| Medborgarplatsen towards Åkeshov | Line 17 | Gullmarsplan towards Skarpnäck |
| Medborgarplatsen towards Alvik | Line 18 | Gullmarsplan towards Farsta strand |
| Medborgarplatsen towards Hässelby strand | Line 19 | Gullmarsplan towards Hagsätra |
Location
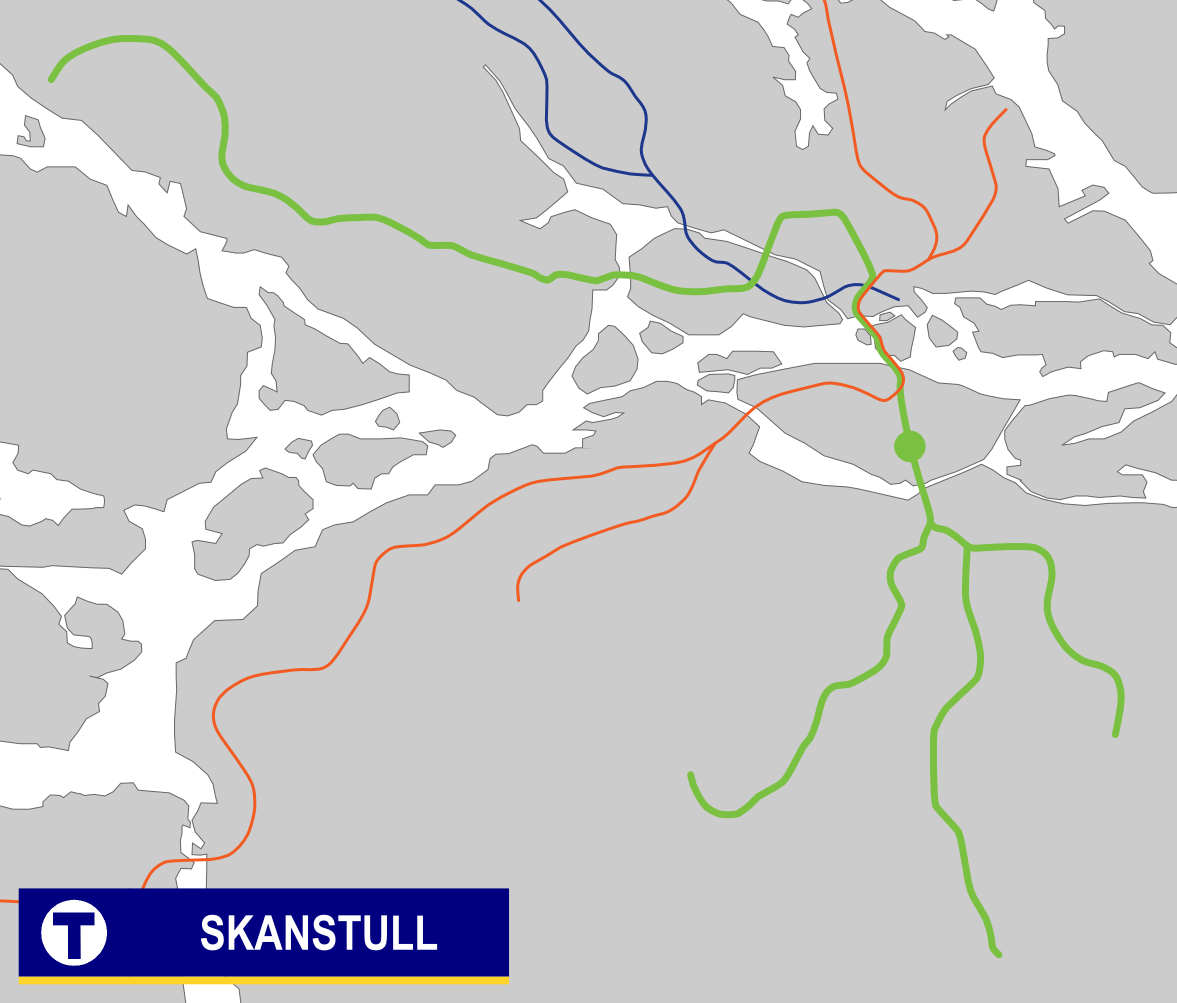

Skanstull is a station on the Green Line of the Stockholm Metro. It is situated in the Skanstull area of the island of Södermalm in Stockholm, Sweden, and is 1.2 km (0.75 mi) from Slussen.

== History ==
Originally known as Ringvägen, Skanstull is one of the oldest underground stations in Stockholm, alongside Medborgarplatsen. The station predates the Stockholm Metro itself, as it is located in the Södertunneln, a tunnel opened in 1933 for tram routes 8 and 19.

The station's first entrance was situated at the junction of Götgatan and Ringvägen, and the station retained the name Ringvägen throughout its time as a tram station.

On 1 October 1950, the station became part of Stockholm's first metro line and was renamed Skanstull. The Södertunneln was adapted for metro operation as part of the line running south from Slussen to Hökarängen, and the station was rebuilt to meet metro standards. A new entrance on Allhelgonagatan opened on 21 November 1957. The station was subsequently rebuilt in 2003–2004, and its platform was upgraded in 2009.

== Operation ==
The station lies below Götgatan at its junction with Ringvägen, and has two tracks and a single, rather narrow, island platform that lies about 5 metres (16 ft) below the street. The are two ticket halls, giving access at opposite ends of the platform.

The southern ticket hall lies at basement level under the junction of Götgatan with Ringvägen, and has street level entrances, via stairs, escalators and lifts, on both sides of Götgatan. There is similar access from there to the platform. The northern ticket hall is accessed from Allhelgonagatan, and has escalators descending to a passageway under the tracks, and stairs up to the platform from there. This entrance has no lifts.

To the north of the station, trains run through the Södertunneln towards Medborgarplatsen. To the south they leave the tunnel to cross the Hammarbyleden waterway on the Skanstullsbron bridge towards Gullmarsplan.

== Art ==
The southern ticket hall houses the art project Konstväxlingar, dating from 2004, in which video art is shown on screens.

== Gallery ==
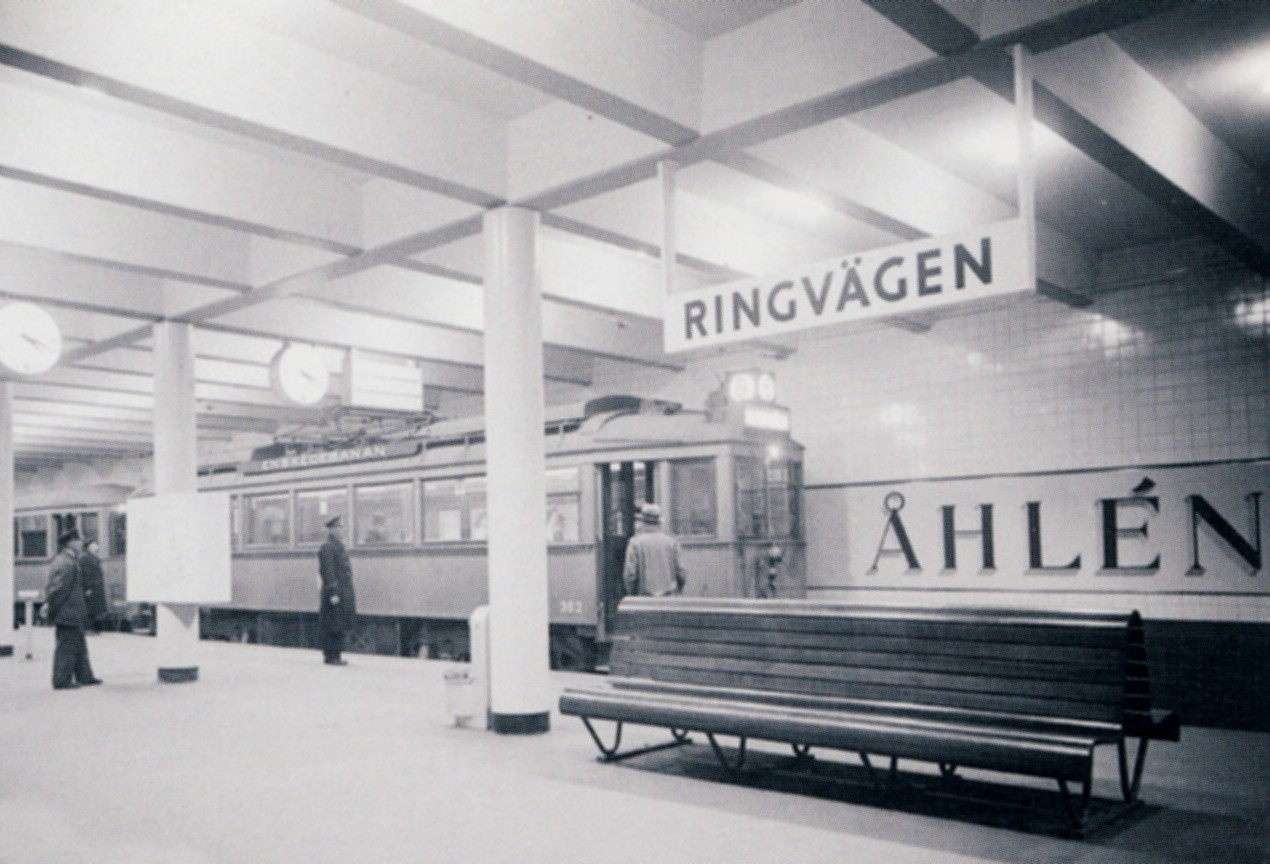
Ringvägen station platform, as it was when served by trams in 1935

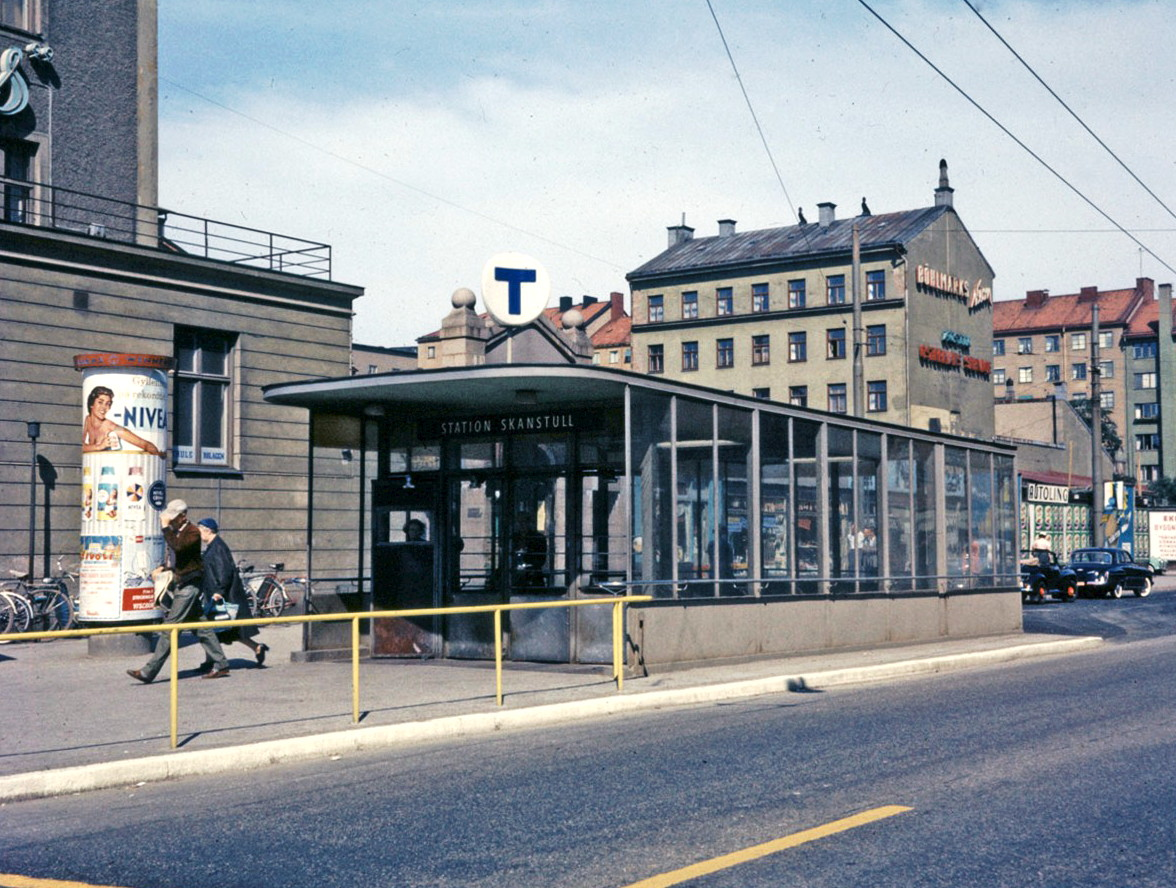
The Ringvägen entrance to the metro station in 1957

Allhelgonagatan entrance, with escalators, barriers and street entrance
