= Erik Fleming (silversmith) =

Swedish silversmith (1894–1954)

- Born: Erik Herman Fleming; April 26, 1894; Stockholm, Sweden
- Died: November 14, 1954 (aged 60); Stockholm, Sweden
- Occupations: Baron, teacher, designer, silversmith, goldsmith
- Children: Lars Fleming
- Awards: Prince Eugen Medal (1947)

Erik Herman Fleming (April 26, 1894 – November 14, 1954) was a Swedish metalsmith, baron, teacher, and designer. He was one of the foremost Swedish silversmiths of his time, and worked as a Swedish court artisan.

== Life and career ==
Erik Herman Fleming was born on April 26, 1894, in Stockholm, to parents Sigrid Wilhelmina Amalia Söderhielm and Oscar Herman August Fleming.

He attended the Althin's School of Painting in Stockholm from 1914 to 1915; and continued his studies in engineering at the Technische Universität Berlin from 1915 to 1917; and architecture at the Ludwig-Maximilians-Universität München from 1917 to 1918. He learned silversmithing as a hobby initially, and enjoyed it enough to pursued further study under Anna Möcklin (who had worked for C. G. Hallberg and K. Andersson).

In 1921, Fleming founded Atelier Borgila, a silver workshop and royal court supplier in Stockholm. C. F. Larsson was hired as the lead foreman for Atelier Borgila. Additionally Fleming taught metal arts at Konstfack in Stockholm, where he became head teacher of metal arts from 1947 until his death in 1954.

He was the father of the silversmith Lars Fleming (1928–2025).

Fleming's work is in the museum collection at the Nationalmuseum in Stockholm, Sweden.
