= Van der Noot =

Van der Noot is a Dutch or Flemish surname, with several variations. Van der Noot may refer to:

- The noble family of the Count van der Noot, the current Marquess of Assche:
  - Philips Erard van der Noot, 13th Bishop of Ghent.
  - Roger-Wauthier van der Noot, 1st Baron of Carloo, mayor of Brussels.
  - Maximiliaan Antoon van der Noot, Bishop of Ghent.
  - Theodore van der Noot, 8th Marquess of Assche
  - Elisabeth van der Noot d'Assche, daughter of the 9th Marquess of Assche.
  - Henri Van der Noot (1731–1827), Belgian revolutionary and nationalist
- Thomas van der Noot (1475–1525), Belgian printer and author
- Jonker Jan van der Noot (1539–1595), Flemish poet
- Thomas van der Noot (military figure) (1630–1677), Belgian soldier in the Swedish army
- Dino Betti van der Noot (born 1936), an Italian jazz composer

Vandernoot may refer to:

- Alexandra Vandernoot (born 1965), Belgian actress
- André Vandernoot (1927–1991), Belgian conductor

== See also ==
- Van der Nootska Palace, a palace in Sweden built by Thomas van der Noot.
