= Noot =

Noot may refer to:

- Van der Noot, surname
- Gwain Noot Sexton (née Gwain Harriette Noot; 1909–2007), Canadian-born American author, illustrator, visual artist, fashion designer
- Noot Seear (born 1983), Canadian fashion model and actress
- Noot vir Noot (Note for Note), an Afrikaans language musical quiz shown on South African television
- "Noot", a vocalization on the Swiss-British children's television series Pingu
- Noot., taxonomic author abbreviation of Hans Peter Nooteboom (born 1934), Dutch botanist
