= Sankt Paulsgatan =

Street in Södermalm, Stockholm, Sweden

Coordinates: 59°19′6.7″N 18°4′14.9″E

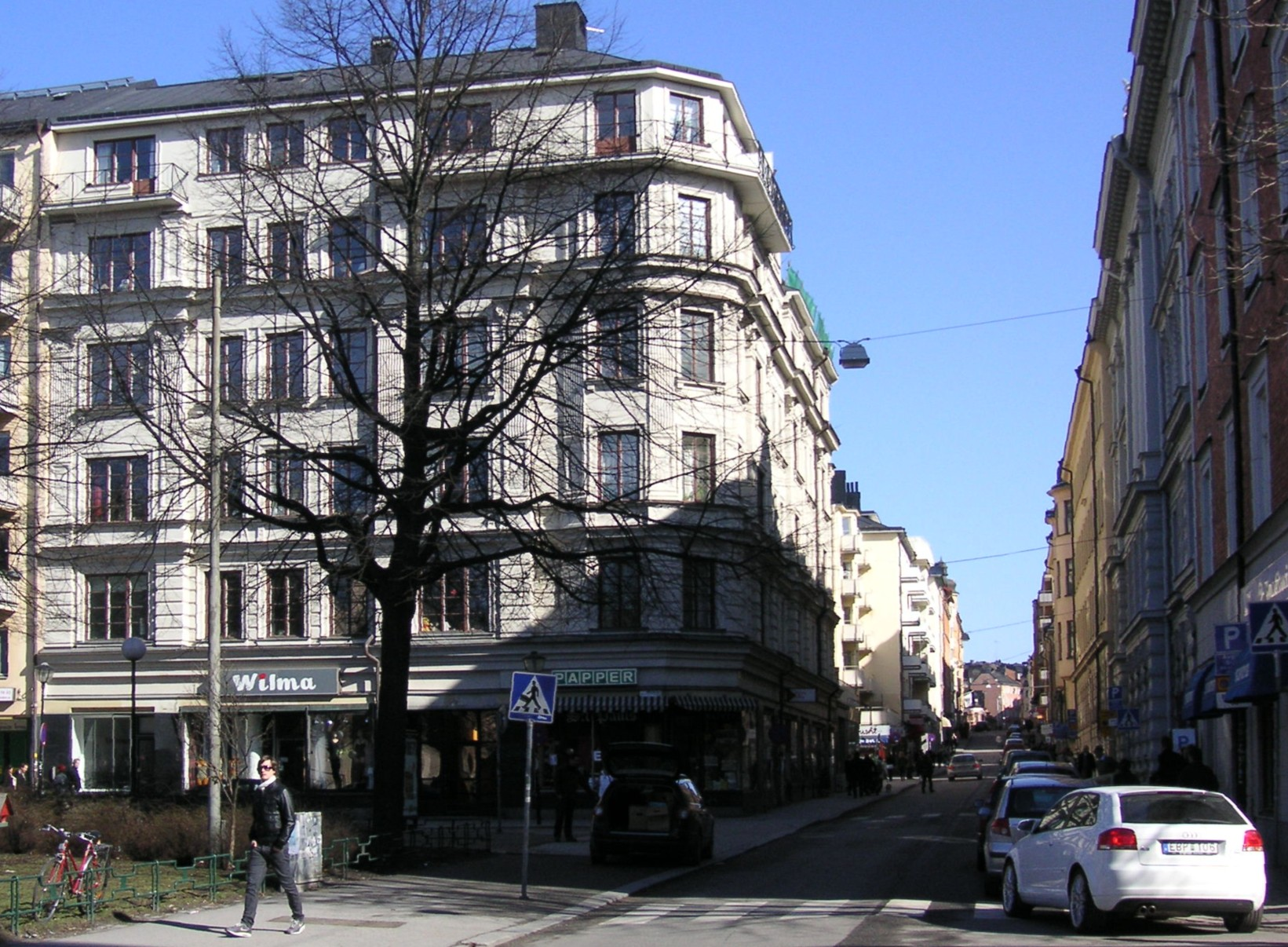
Sankt Paulsgatan in 2008

Sankt Paulsgatan (St. Paul Street) is a street of Södermalm, Stockholm, Sweden. The street leads east–west from Götgatan to Torkel Knutssonsgatan, parallel to Hornsgatan which is approximately 770 feet long.

In 1647 the street was first referred to as Sancti Påwels gathun. It is unclear where the name came from, but possibly the Maria Magdalena Church, which is close by, giving rise to the name of the street. The former Methodist St. Paul Church which lies along the street is named after the street. Also found on the street are Mariatorget (Maria Square) and Van der Noot Palace.
