= Jean Jahnsson =

Bror Johan (Jean) Teodor Jahnsson (7 September 1854 – 5 March 1944) was a Swedish jeweller, art collector and Consul General. Jahnsson was born in Stockholm, where he joined the goldsmith C.G. Hallberg's factory and shop in 1875, becoming a manager in 1879 and then president in 1896 of the goldsmith firm. In 1927 he was commissioned to evaluate Turkey's treasury.

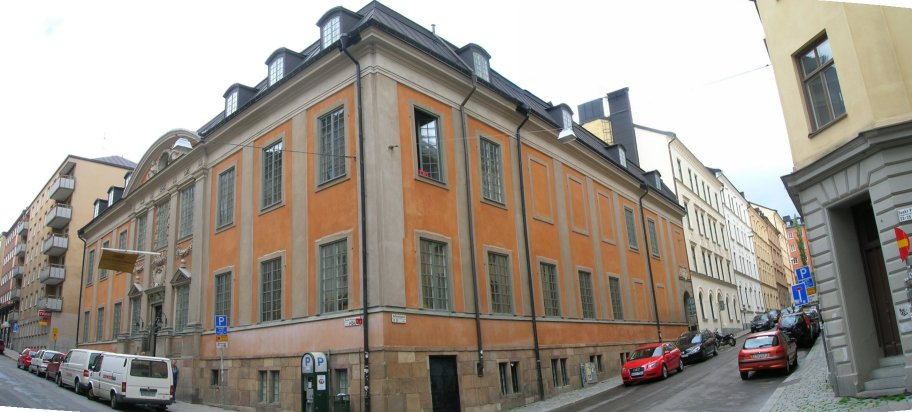
Van der Nootska Palace

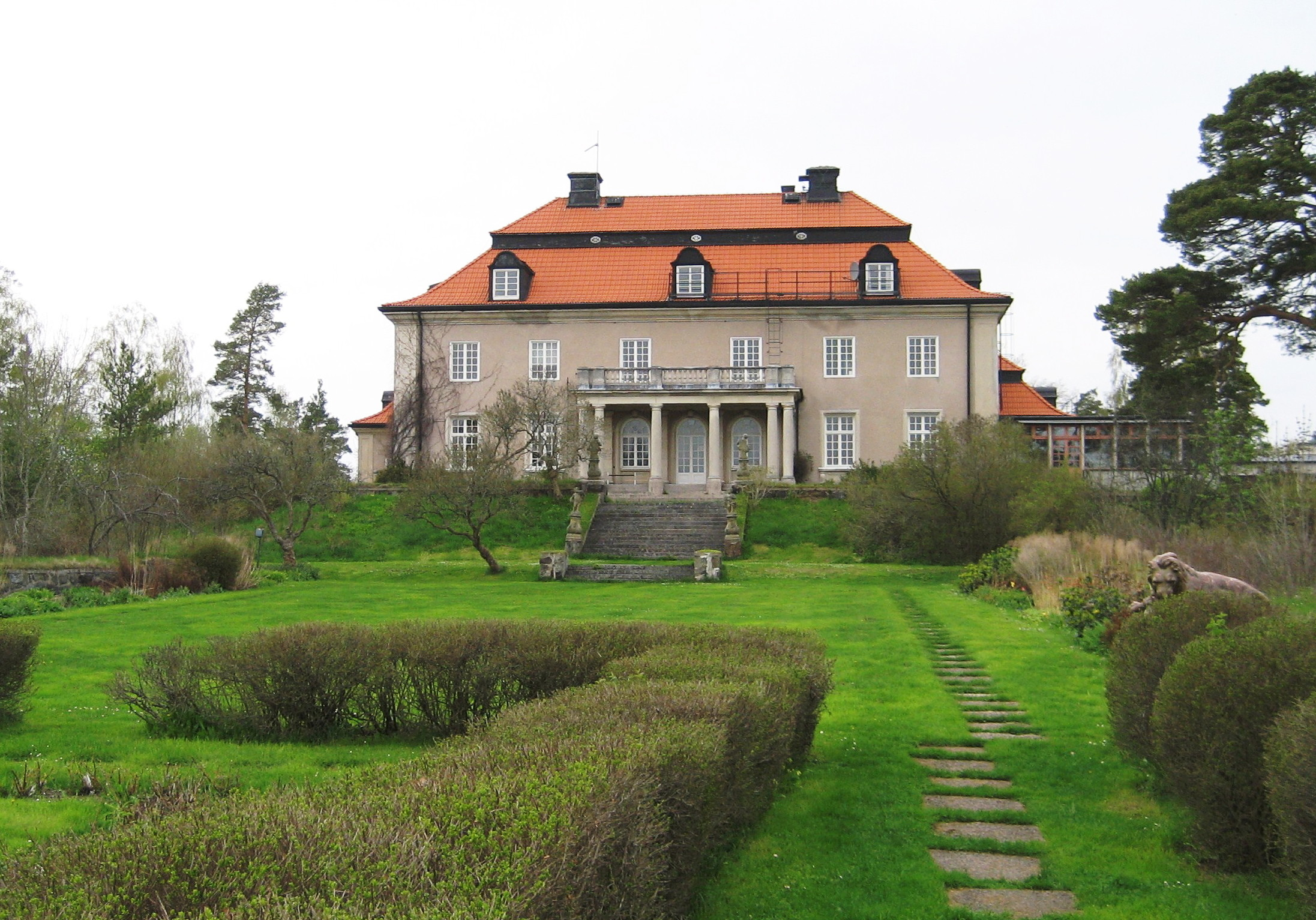
Stensunds Castle

Jahnsson acquired the old aristocratic Van der Nootska Palace in Stockholm in 1902, which had long been standing and fallen, and saved it from demolition by ensuring it undergo a complete restoration in consultation with a commission of architects which included Isak Gustaf Clason, Kasper Salin and Agi Lindegren and painter Vicke Andrén; it was the latter two who carried out the restoration.

Jahnsson gathered a rich collection at the palace, including mainly Swedish silverware, a collection of hundreds of spoons from the 15th century onwards, porcelain, an unmatched collection of precious bejeweled gold boxes, Swedish miniatures, art furniture, Swedish engraving portraits and a library of much more than 100,000 volumes, including nearly complete collections of Swedish dramatic literature and Reformation writings, Swedish history books and documents etc. Jahnson also had an extensive weapons collection, stored in Stensund Castle. Jahnsson was hit hard by the Kreuger crash in the early 1930s, in which he was stripped of his wealth and forced to leave the Van der Nootska Palace and auction off most of the collections. Stensund Castle was sold to Carl Matthiessen, 1933, and the weapons collection auctioned off . The remainder of Jahnsson's collections from Van der Nootska, which mainly consisted of the Stockholmiana Collection, were donated in 1942 to the Stockholm City Museum of Axel Wenner-Gren, who in February 1938, had bought the Van der Nootska Palace. The Stockholmiana Collection consisted of about 5000 images and about 3000 books and pamphlets.
