= Thomas van der Noot (military figure) =

Thomas van der Noot (1630–1677) was a Dutch military figure who served in the Swedish army. Born in Brabant, he came to Sweden with his mother in the 1650s and married a Swedish noble lady. Thomas van der Noot became a Swedish officer, second lieutenant in 1655, colonel in 1668 and was Major General in 1677, and participated in the Swedish service in many battles in Europe. He was in knighted in about 1674 about the time he built the Van der Nootska Palace in Stockholm. He was killed in the Battle of Stettin on 4 August 1677. After his death the Van der Nootska palace become an embassy to the Dutch minister.
