= C. G. Hallberg =

Swedish goldsmith, jeweler business

Carl Gustaf Hallberg, commonly known as C. G. Hallberg, was a prominent Swedish goldsmith and jeweler business, which in 1886 worked for the Swedish Court. Its central store was located at Drottninggatan 6 in Stockholm. It is best known for its silverware and metalware, which continue to fetch high prices in auctions today. In the early 20th century it was the largest jeweler in Scandinavia and one of Sweden's top firms; by 1961 it was still the largest jeweler in Sweden with 31 domestic shops and a global export network.

It was named after Carl Gustaf Hallberg (June 5, 1824 – April 12, 1888), who founded the business in 1860. When Hallberg left the business, Jean Jahnsson was president from 1896. It merged with GAB in 1961.
