= Björns trädgård =

Park in Södermalm, Stockholm, Sweden

Coordinates: 59°18′55″N 18°04′26″E

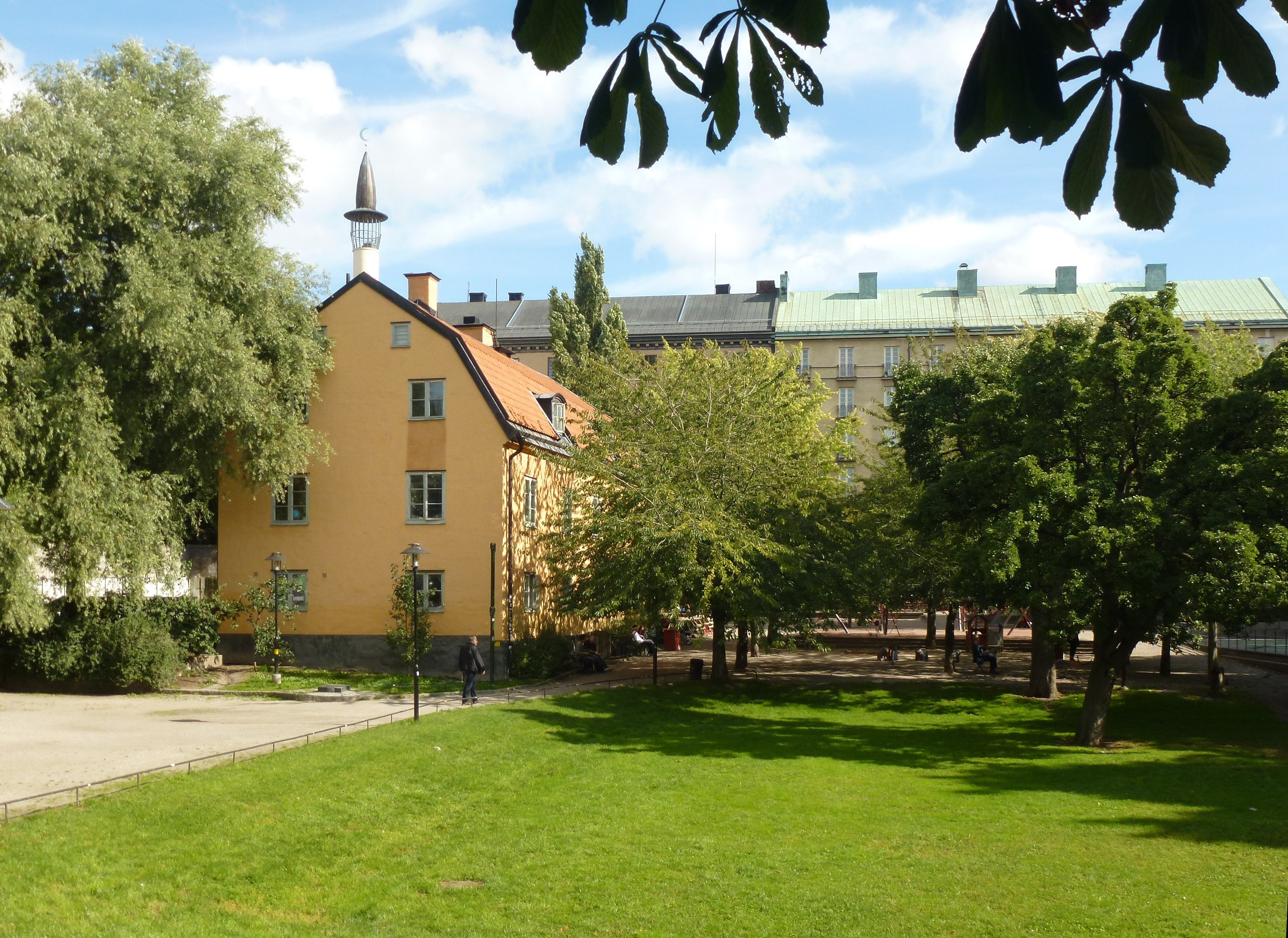
Björns trädgård 2012

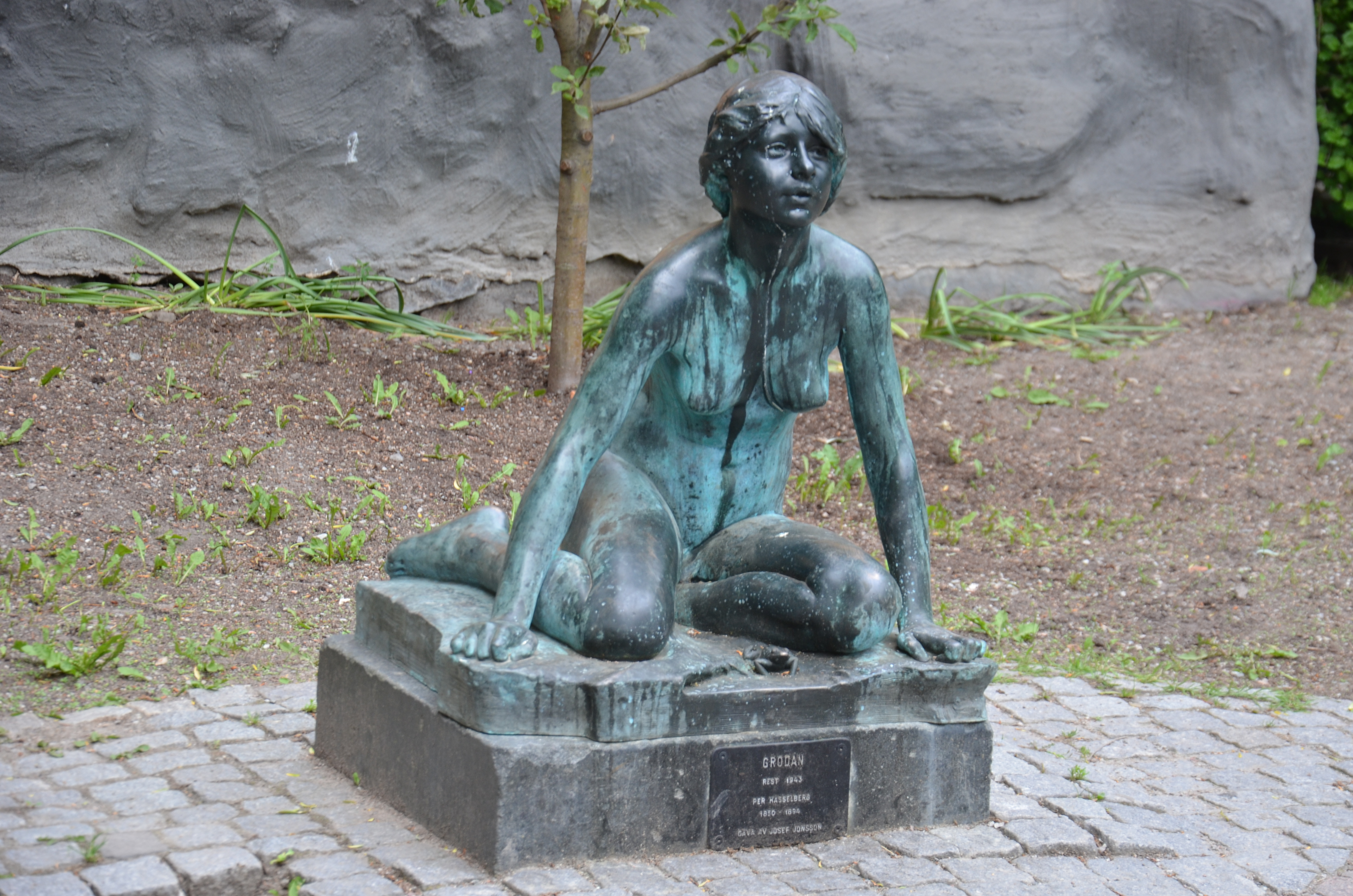
Grodan by Per Hasselberg at Björns trädgård

Björns trädgård is a park on Södermalm in Stockholm, Sweden. The park is located by the major street Götgatan, opposite Medborgarplatsen.

== History ==
The park is a green place for the citizens of Stockholm, and contain a playground for children. The park was named after the former owner Swedish doctor Karl Fredrik Björn (1855-1915). In 1925, the City of Stockholm began the construction work for a children's playground. In 1929, the renovation of the park's older lots was initiated, and in 1933–1935, terrace lots and retaining walls were added, as well as a splashing pond at the western end of the ore farm. The park was given a major facelift in 2004 and now contains a skateboard ramp. The Stockholm Mosque is located on a hill by the park. In the park is the sculpture "Grodan" which was cast in bronze in 1943 by Per Hasselberg (1850 – 1894).
