= Götgatan =

Street in Södermalm, Stockholm, Sweden

Coordinates: 59°19′10.6″N 18°04′14.2″E

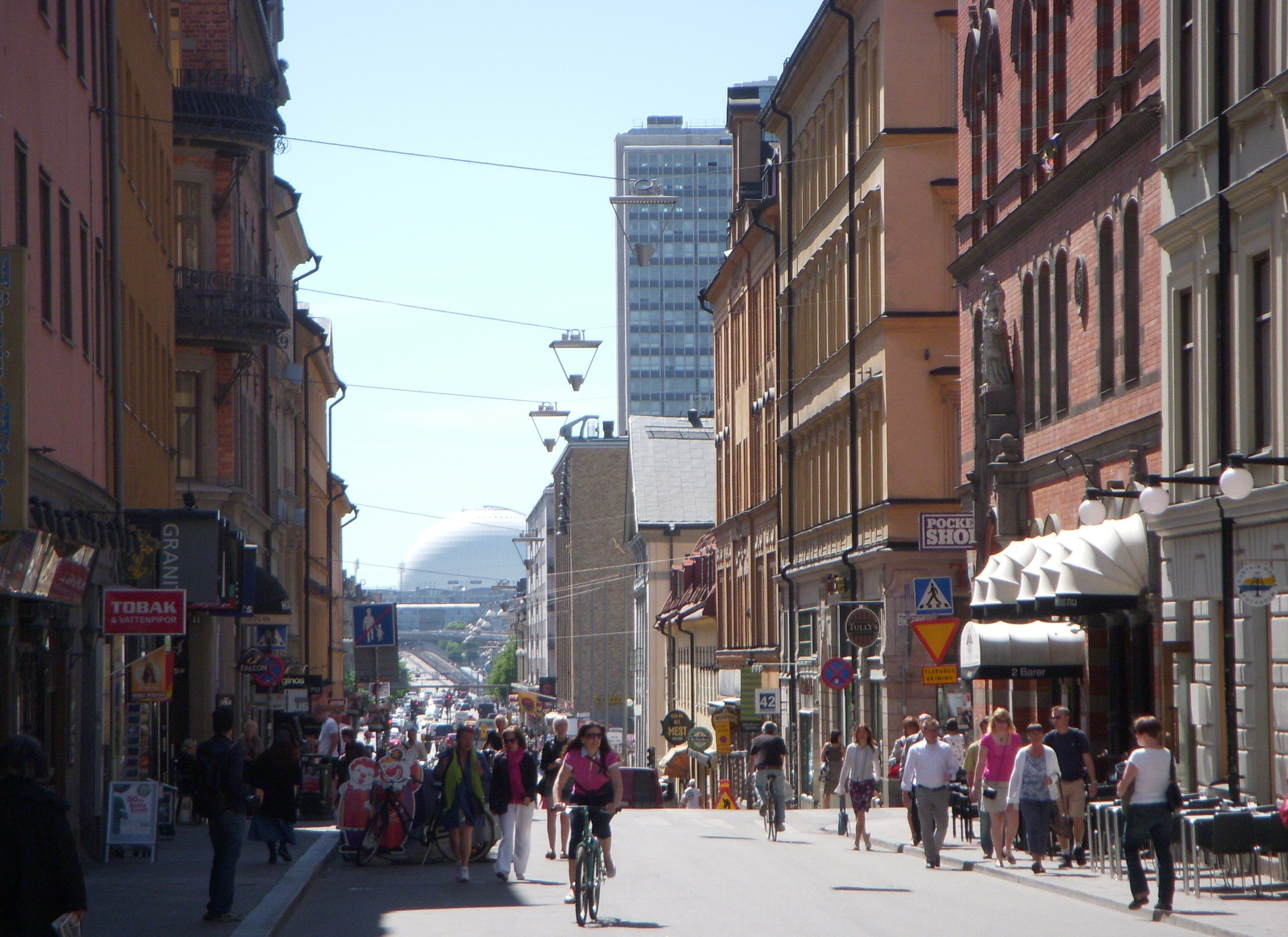
View of Götgatan from the top of the hill looking south. Skatteskrapan building rises on the right and Globen Arena can be seen in the distance.

Götgatan (Original Swedish Göthegatan for "Gothia Street") is the name of one of the longest streets in central Stockholm on the Southern Isle (Södermalm) of the city. The street itself has existed since the 12th century, and has had its name since the 1640s, the name based on it being a part of the old Göta highway.

At its northern end behind Stockholm City Museum it connects to Södermalm Square at Slussen, and it runs due south from there to the former toll position of Skanstull and a high bridge (Skanstullsbron) leading over to Globe Arena and mainland suburbs.

Götgatan passes spacious Citizen Square (Medborgarplatsen) and one of Stockholm's first skyscrapers popularly called Skatteskrapan (the Tax Scraper) because until recently it housed Sweden's tax authority. In a country known for high tax rates, the term Barescraper has also been used for the building, and for decades taxpayers would traipse along Götgatan and line up ceremoniously to file their income tax forms on the day they were due.

Greta Garbo was born a block west of Götgatan, and there is a bust of her on the (newer) building. A square named for her is located a few blocks east along park-like Katarina Bangata. Also a block away in either direction are the Roman Catholic Cathedral and the Stockholm Mosque.

There are three Metro stations along the street with two entrances for each.

The northernmost stretch of Götgatan runs southward up a steep slope from intersecting Hornsgatan (another long street that also begins there) and then descends to level off before Citizen Square. That portion is pedestrian, called Götgatsbacken ("Goth Street Slope") and has become increasingly trendy in recent years. The Royal Dutch Embassy is located there.

Otherwise Götgatan and all of the Southern Isle have long been known as a less pretentious and more relaxed – and so less fashionable – area than other parts of Stockholm. The area has been home to many struggling artists and artisans, and working-class residents. One of the area's oldest restaurants, Den gröne Jägaren, opened in 1866 in a block still owned by the Catholic Church.

== See also ==
- Geography of Stockholm
