= Our Lady of Consolation (disambiguation) =

Our Lady of Consolation is a Christian term honoring the Virgin Mary.

It may also refer to:

- Basilica and National Shrine of Our Lady of Consolation, Carey, Ohio, United States
- Basilica of Our Lady of Consolation, Táriba, Táchira, Venezuela
- Shrine Church of Our Lady of Consolation and St Francis, West Grinstead, West Sussex, England.
- Santuario della Consolata, Turin, Piedmont, Italy
