= Basilica of Our Lady of Consolation, Táriba =

Basilica of Our Lady of Consolation
- Basílica de Nuestra Señora de la Consolación
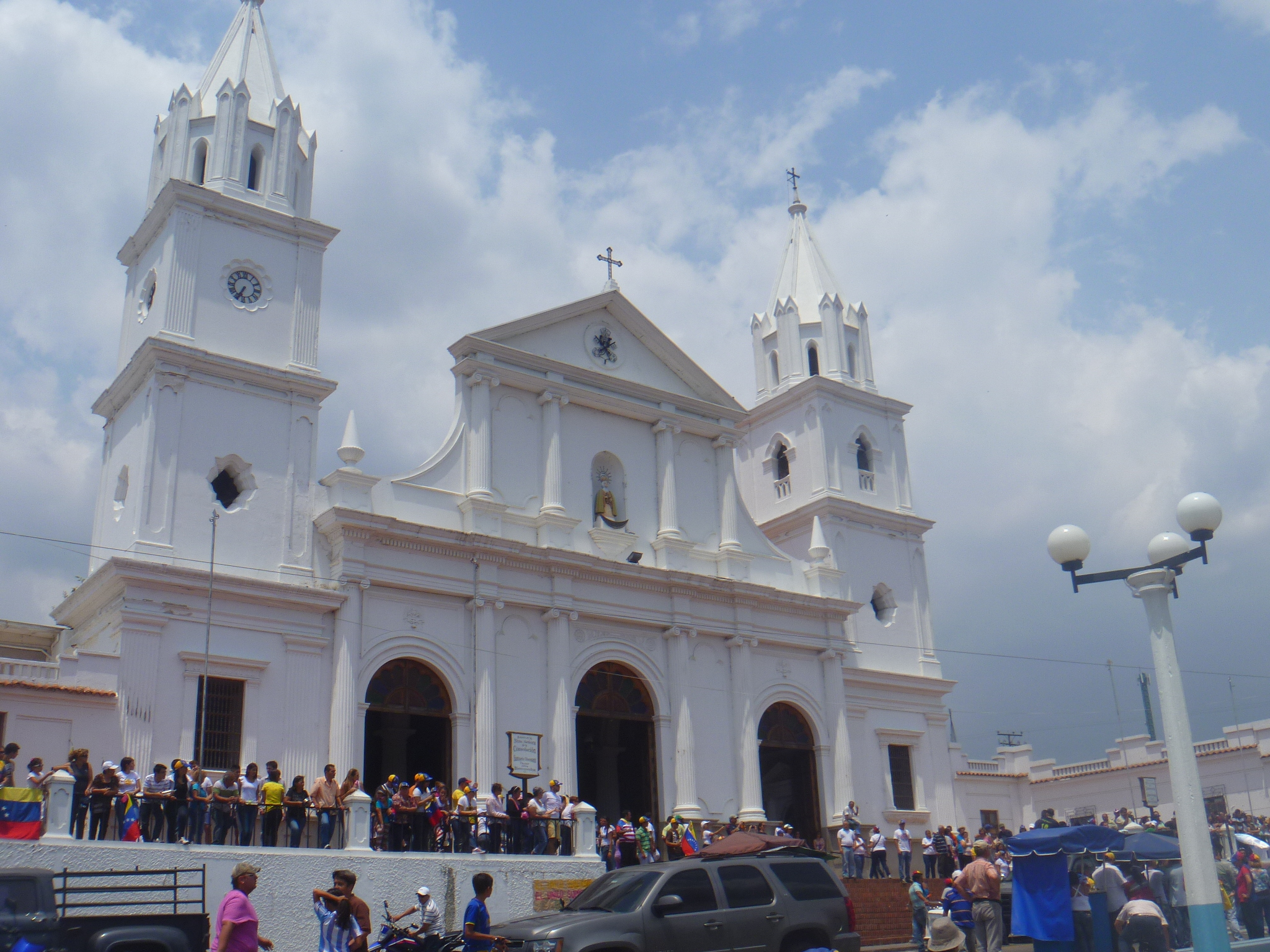
- Basilica of Our Lady of Consolation
- 7°49′04″N 72°13′36″W
- Location: Plaza Bolívar 5001, Táriba
- Country: Venezuela
- Denomination: Roman Catholic Church

Administration
- Diocese: Roman Catholic Diocese of San Cristóbal de Venezuela

The Basilica of Our Lady of Consolation (also Basilica of Táriba; Spanish: Basílica de Nuestra Señora de la Consolación) is a Catholic church located in the locality of Táriba in Táchira state in the Andes of Venezuela. It gained the status of basilica via the Pontifical Decree issued by Pope John XXIII on 20 October 1959, entitled Solacium ac Levationem.

The basilica enshrines a venerated Marian image granted a Pontifical decree of coronation titled Alacres Dei on 9 November 1959 by Pope John XXIII. The rite of coronation was executed on 12 March 1967 by the former Archbishop of Caracas, Cardinal José Humberto Quintero Parra.

The Catholic priest Francisco Martínez de Espinoza, curate and vicar of the Villa of San Cristóbal, began the construction of the first church dedicated to the Virgin of Táriba on 19 August 1690, which would later also be replaced.

The present church is dedicated to Our Lady of Consolation, patron of the state Táchira. Pope John XXIII gave it the title of minor basilica, as a work of Monsignor Miguel Ignacio Briceño Picón and due to the efforts made by Monsignor Alejandro Fernández Feo during the period of 1904 and 1913. It was remodeled under the administration of Monsignor Alejandro Figueroa Medina for the approaching date of the canonical coronation of the virgin.

The basilica was critically rebuilt in the 1960s due to the contributions of Martín Marciales Moncada.

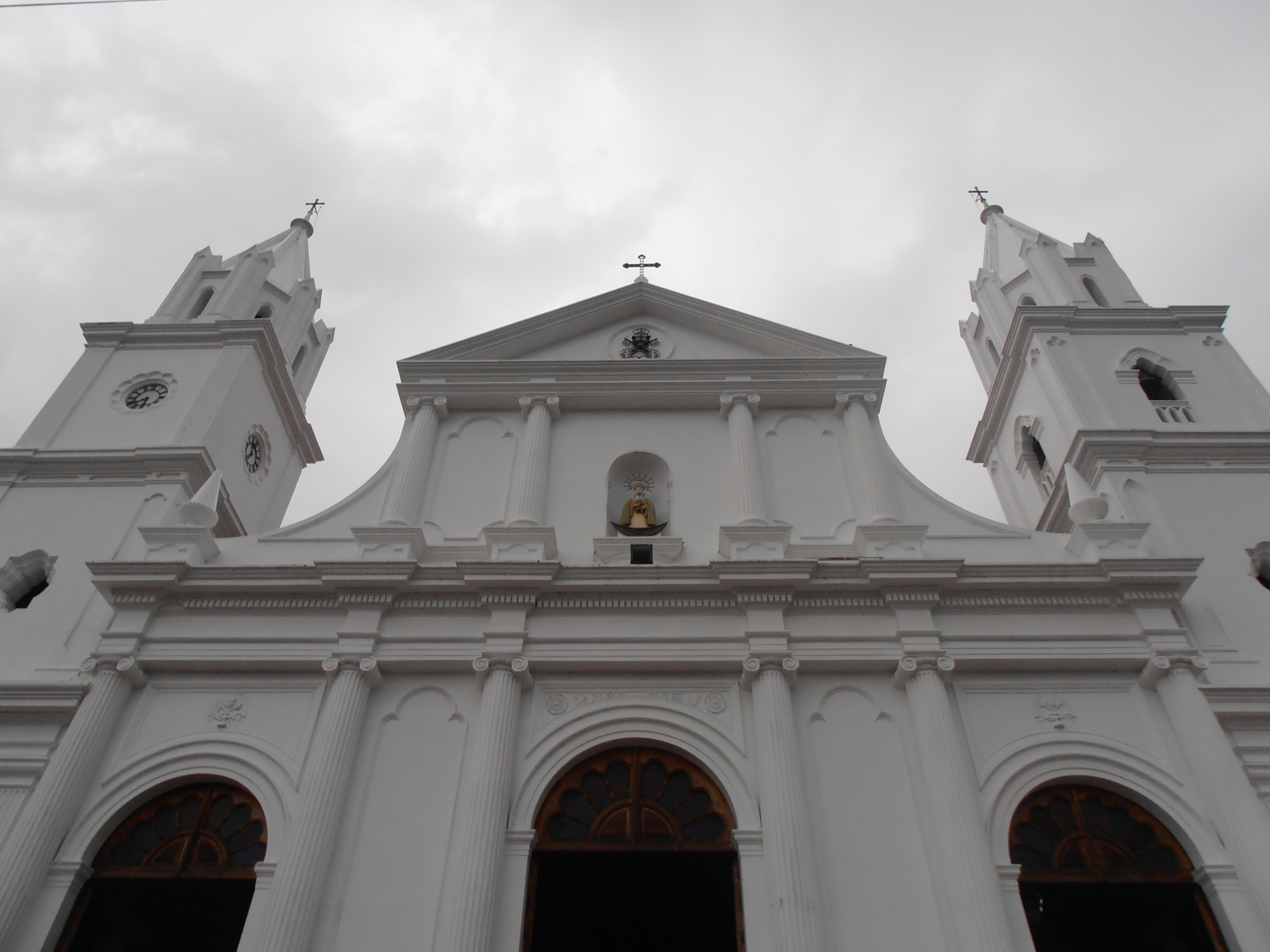
Another view

== See also ==
- Roman Catholicism in Venezuela
- Basilica and National Shrine of Our Lady of Consolation
