= Martín Marciales Moncada =

Venezuelan visionary, entrepreneur, and philanthropist

Martín Marciales, hijo
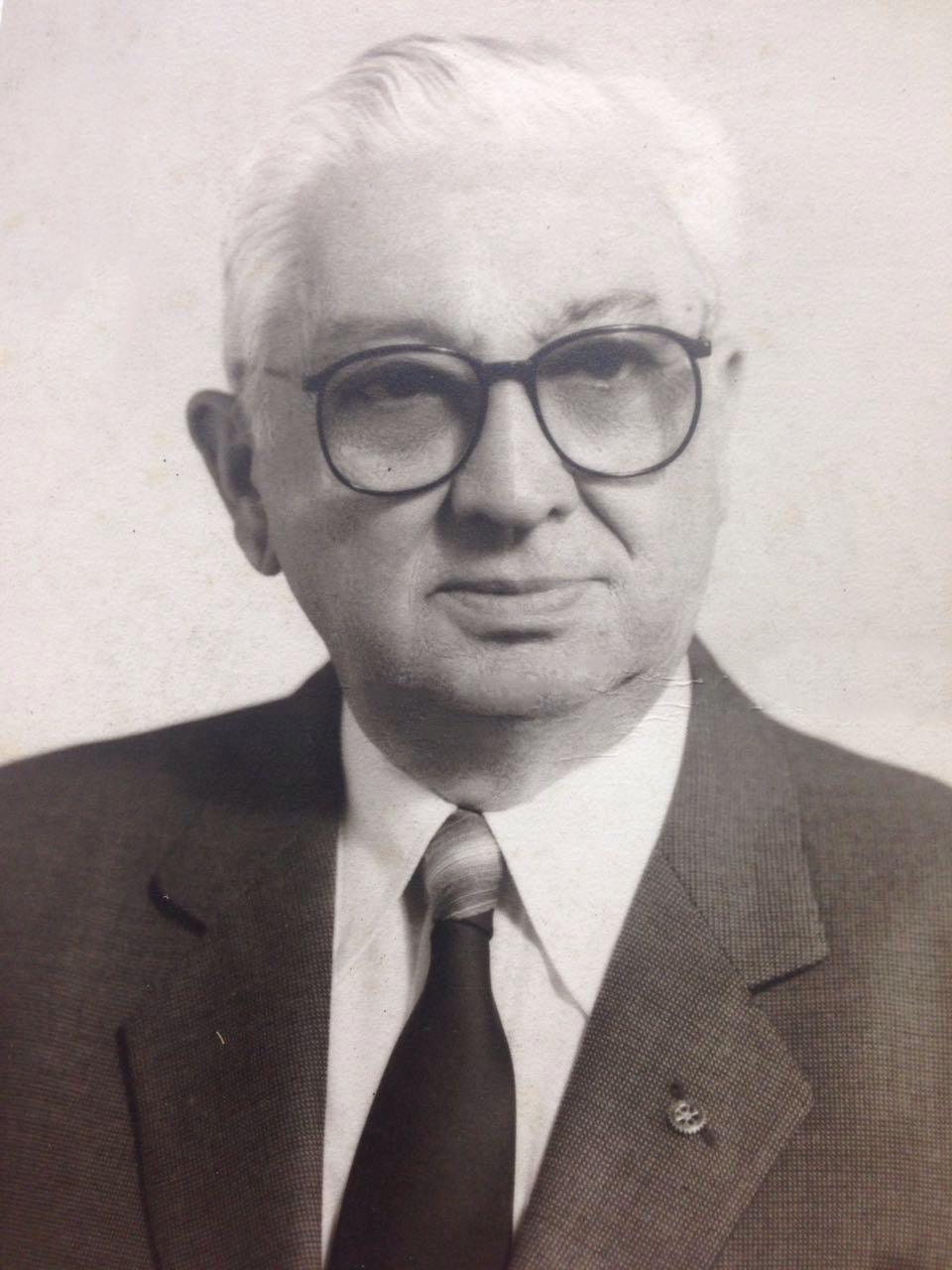
- Born: Martín Marciales Moncada; January 18, 1912; Táriba, Táchira, Venezuela
- Died: March 6, 2001 (aged 83)
- Occupations: Visionary, Entrepreneur and Philanthropist
- Known for: Multiple contributions to the modernization of San Cristóbal
- Spouse: Josefa Marina Gonzalez de Marciales (Mamina) (m. 1945)
- Children: Marcial, Mariana, Mariela and Mario Marciales González
- Parent(s): Martín Marciales Jaime and María Doralisa Moncada Castro
- Honours: Multiple orders, most notably:

Martín Marciales Moncada, known as Martín Marciales, hijo (January 18, 1912 – March 6, 2001) was a Venezuelan visionary, entrepreneur, and philanthropist. He critically contributed to the development of the city of San Cristóbal during the 20th century. Martín Marciales Moncada was one of the few financially successful Venezuelan entrepreneurs who was never involved in politics. President Velásquez referred to him as a “rarely seen prophet in his own land.” Historian Luis Hernández Contreras researched Martín Marciales Moncada's personal and public life and published his biography in a three-volume tome entitled Martín Marciales, hijo, which includes a prologue written by former Venezuelan President Ramón J. Velásquez. Martín Marciales Moncada was one of very few recipients of the Order Francisco de Miranda, Knight Grand Cross (1st Class), the highest rank of the order. It was the only time President Velasquez traveled outside of the capital city to grant the National Order to a citizen.

== Early life ==
Martín Marciales Jaime, Martín Marciales Moncada's father, was a revolutionary in favor of Juan Pablo Peñaloza, the opposition leader to both Cipriano Castro and Juan Vicente Gómez. The opposition were then called “Yellow Liberals.” Martin Marciales Jaime was a carpenter who hid weapons in secret compartments in the furniture he made. The weapons were intended to arm the forces of the so-called “Yellow Revolutionaries” who hoped to oust then dictator Juan Vicente Gómez from power.

When Martín Marciales Moncada was eight years old, his father was sent to prison at El Castillo de San Carlos due to his revolutionary activities. The entire family relocated closer to the prison so they could visit and assist Martin Marciales Jaime. At that time, Martín Marciales Moncada started working to help support his family. He and his mother opened a small shop where they sold groceries and basic goods. Martín Marciales Moncada graduated from elementary school, but did not continue his education.

== Return to San Cristóbal ==
As a young teenager, Martín Marciales Moncada started working as a traveling merchant. He sold spare parts for vehicles, including tires, as well as other goods. In his early twenties, Martín Marciales Moncada returned to San Cristóbal. There, he bought from his father and began managing a Chevrolet car dealership.

During this time, the Germans dominated most of local commerce in the area using their own monetary system; they paid local farmers with custom-made tokens, which could only be used in German-owned shops and businesses. As such, there was no real local currency in circulation. Martín Marciales Moncada played major role in disentangling the local economy from the German influenced system of tokens.

Later, at the age of 28, Martín Marciales Moncada began directly importing General Motors vehicles to San Cristóbal, and was one of two major importers of GM vehicles in the country. This business effort allowed Martín Marciales Moncada to develop enough financial power to contribute significantly to the city's development. Martín Marciales Moncada's biographer, Luis Hernández Contreras, described these efforts as Martín Marciales Moncada's “own diverse ways of being useful.”

On April 7, 1945, Martín Marciales Moncada married Marina González Romero. The couple had four children: Marcial, Mariana, Mariela, and Mario. Marina still resides in San Cristóbal and is a renowned philanthropist and artist.

== "Diverse ways of being useful" ==
=== Philanthropic Ventures ===
Martín Marciales Moncada either founded or co-founded the following:

==== Sports ====
- First basketball club
- Gimnasio Cubierto “Arminio Gutiérrez,” the first public sports facility in downtown San Cristóbal
- Club Deportivo Los Andes, founding member
- Los Peligrosos Baseball Club, board of directors
- Associación Deportiva Táchira, honorary president
- Instituto Municipal Superior de San Cristóbal, honorary member
- Guicaipuro, honorary member
- Cardenales Deportivo, honorary member

==== Social Clubs ====
- Club Táchira, board of directors
- El Club Demócrata, first vice president

==== Culture ====
- Salón de Lectura de San Cristóbal, the oldest (founded 1907) civil organization in town dedicated to promoting culture, board of directors member (1942)

==== Health services ====
- (ATLA) Foundation to prevent tuberculosis, founding member
- Policlínica Táchira, the first private clinic in the city, founding member
- Red Cross of San Cristóbal, founding member

==== Rotary Club San Cristóbal ====
He was a founding member of the Rotary Club. Much of Martín Marciales Moncada's philanthropic work was done through the Rotary Club, including:

- wheelchair bank
- sponsored schools
- city parks
- scholarships for students
- a free medical assistance unit for children at Clínica Los Andes
- free distribution of reading glasses for school children

==== Raffles ====
Annual donations of cars as prizes for various fundraising raffles

==== Fire department ====
In 1951, Martín Marciales Moncada imported the first fire truck to San Cristóbal and founded the local fire department. Many local people reported occasions in which he personally saved their lives as a volunteer firefighter.

==== Building the Basilica of Nuestra Señora de la Consolación de Táriba ====
Martín Marciales Moncada used raffle proceeds to help rebuild the Basilica of Our Lady of Consolation, Táriba. He contributed to the raffle by donating two houses, three cars, and ninety sewing machines, which were used as raffle prizes. All proceeds went directly to the Basilica. He was awarded the Order of St. Sylvester for his generosity by Pope Paulo VI on January 11, 1967.

==== Catholic University, San Cristóbal ====
Director of the Asociación Civil, an NGO responsible for the financial and administrative management of the university.

==== Brothers of La Salle (school for boys) ====
Martín Marciales Moncada contributed in founding a school for boys and built a relationship with his lifelong mentor, Fr. Hermano Basilio. Martín Marciales Moncada also sponsored Fr. Basilio's anthropological research on the Orinoco Delta natives.

=== Semi-Philanthropic Ventures ===
Martín Marciales Moncada was also dedicated to many private ventures for the sake of city development. These ventures did not serve as a source of personal income. He either founded or co-founded the following:

- Transportes Aéreos Centroamericanos (TACA). Martín Marciales Moncada created the San Cristóbal branch of the airline TACA and developed the first flight connections between San Cristóbal and the rest of the country.
- Cementos Tachíra, cement factory, co-founder
- Central Azucarero de Ureña, sugar plant, member of the promoting board
- Pasteurizadora Tachira, dairy plant, co-founder
- Matadero Industrial de la Fría, slaughterhouse, co-founder
- Pro-Vivienda, non-profit savings and loan institution, co-founder. Pro-Vivienda was dedicated to funding low-income housing development projects.

== Private Business Ventures ==
Martín Marciales Moncada either founded or co-founded the following:

- Creole Petroleum Corporation – Venezuela, representative. Martín Marciales Moncada developed a network of his own gas stations and created a gasoline transportation company to supply both his gas stations and the local airports with gasoline.
- Bank of Táchira, co-founder
- Regional Development Bank, Los Andes, co-founder
- Banco de Occidente, co-founder
- Seguros Los Andes, insurance company, co-founder

== Other activities ==
- State Chamber of Commerce, founder. Most of the large industry development initiatives in the state were conducted through the State Chamber of Commerce.

== Grandchildren of Note ==
Martín Marciales Moncada and Marina González Romero have fifteen grandchildren: Irene, María Isabel and Marisela Marciales Arreaza; Marcial Alfredo Marciales Carrilo; Carlos Martín and María Luisa Maggiolo Marciales; Elias Alfredo Issa Marciales; Carolina, Vanessa, Mariel and Edgar Martín Espejo Marciales; Martín José, Mario Alfredo, Mauricio and Marcos Marciales Contreras.

Three of Martín Marciales Moncada's grandchildren (Mario Alfredo, Mauricio, and Marcos Marciales Contreras) are national bass fishing champions. All three have represented Venezuela internationally in the National Sports Fishing Team and became the World Bass Fishing Champions, winning the World Championships in 2012.

== Orders ==
Martín Marciales Moncada received the following orders and other honors:

- Knight Grand Cross, Order of Francisco de Miranda, (1st Class), 1993
- Knight, Order of St. Sylvester, Granted by Pope Paulo VI. January 11, 1967
- Order 21 of September 1864. Legislative Assembly of Táchira. Granted on September 21, 1995
- Order Francisco Javier García de Hevia. Gold Class. Táchira's Executive Branch. First Class. Granted on January 12, 1999
- Order of Merit in Work. Táchira's Executive Branch. First Class. Granted on March 16, 1988

== Other Honors ==
- There is a street named after Martín Marciales Moncada in the center of San Cristóbal.
- Key of the City of San Cristóbal. San Cristobal Municipality, March 1988
- 40 years of Service Button from the Fire Department of San Cristobal. 27 of November 1992
- “Augusto Pinaud” Medal of Honor from the National Red Cross Committee of Venezuela. Granted on February 23, 1989
- Paul Harris contributor and member medal from Rotary Club International, April, 1984

== See also ==
- San Cristóbal, Táchira
- Catholic University of Tachira
- Basilica of Our Lady of Consolation, Táriba
