= Our Lady of Consolation =

Catholic title of the Virgin Mary

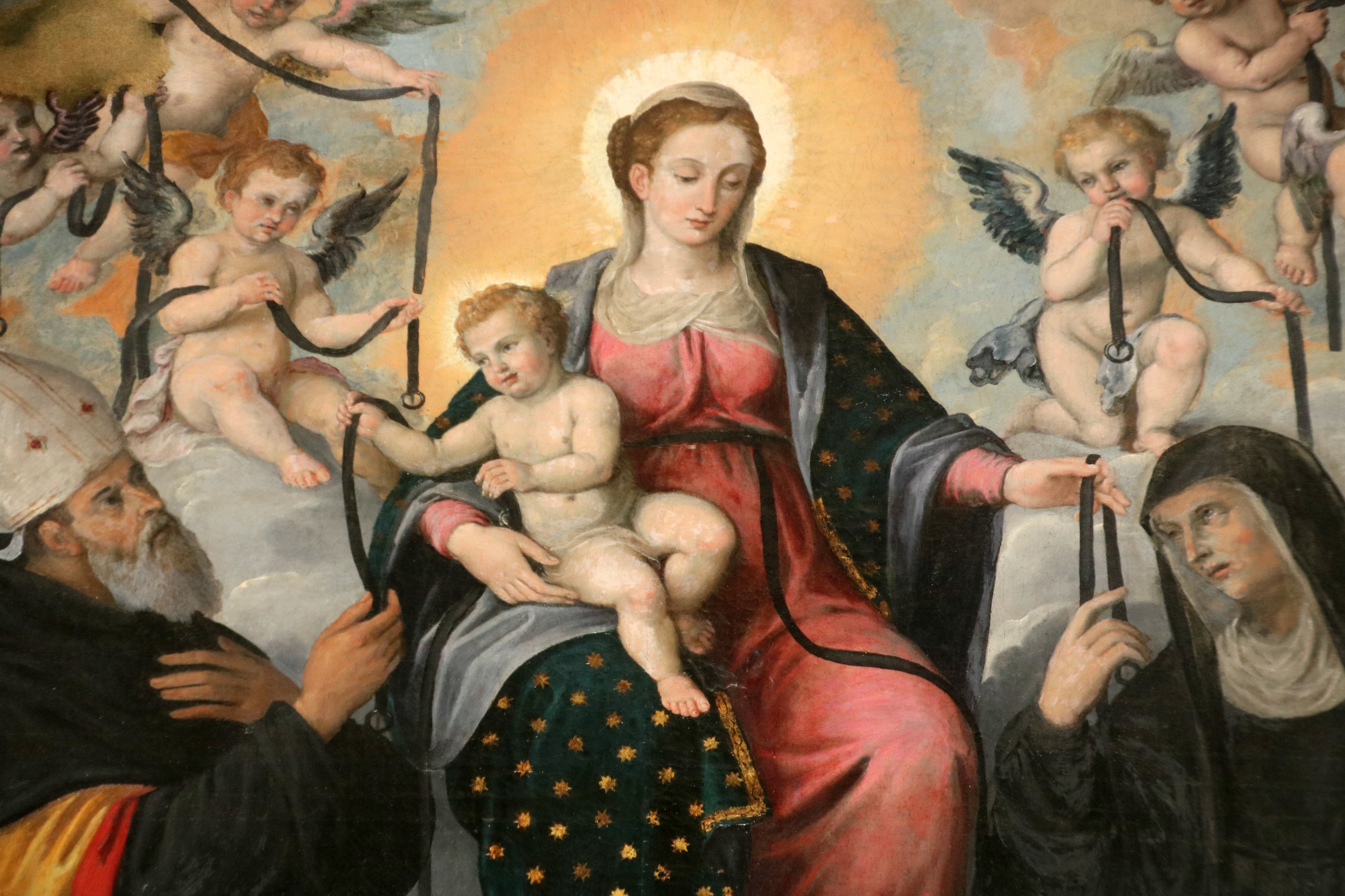
Our Lady of Consolation flanked by Ss. Augustine and Monica by Giovanni Francesco Guerrieri in he Augustinian church in Fossombrone

Our Lady of Consolation or Comforter of the Afflicted (Latin: Nostra Domina de Consolatricis Afflictorum) is a Roman Catholic title of the Blessed Virgin Mary venerated in the Catholic Church.

== History ==
The origin of this invocation is derived from the Augustinian friars who propagated this particular devotion. Along with Saints Augustine, and Monica, Our Lady of Consolation is one of the three patrons of the Augustinian orders. The title Consolatrix Afflictorum (English: Comforter of the Afflicted) is part of the Litany of Loreto, and is Augustinian in origin. This devotion was propagated by the Augustinian monks. By the early 18th century the custom of asking for the final blessing before death in the name of Our Lady of Consolation was very popular.

In congregations of the Augustinian Order, the "Augustinian Rosary" is sometimes called the "Crown of Our Mother of Consolation". The traditional depiction in Augustinian houses show Mary holding the Child Jesus on her lap. They both hold the Augustinian cincture in their hands.

== Archconfraternity ==
The oldest and most celebrated of these Confraternities of the Cord is probably the Archconfraternity of Our Lady of Consolation, also called the Archconfraternity of the Cincture of Saint Monica, Saint Augustine and Saint Nicholas of Tolentino. In 1439, the Augustinian Order obtained the faculty to set up the Confraternity of the Cincture for lay people. Later on, it was adopted by the Hermits of Saint Augustine as a distinctive part of their habit.

The confraternity of Our Lady of Consolation was founded in 1495 in Bologna, Italy. In 1575 both confraternities merged in a single Archconfraternity of Our Lady of Consolation and Cincture. Other similar confraternities were aggregated to the Archconfraternity in Bologna.

The annual feast of the Archconfraternity is 4 September. Members are obliged to wear a black leather belt, to fast on the vigil of the feast of Saint Augustine and to recite daily the "Little Rosary of Our Lady of Consolation" which is composed of thirteen couplets of beads. The essential prayers to be said are Our Father and Hail Mary repeated thirteen times after which is recited the Hail Holy Queen.

For the erection of and reception into this archconfraternity, special faculties must be had from the prior general. The headquarters of the society is the Church of Sant'Agostino, Rome where the body of Saint Monica lies.

== Veneration of the Blessed Virgin Mary ==
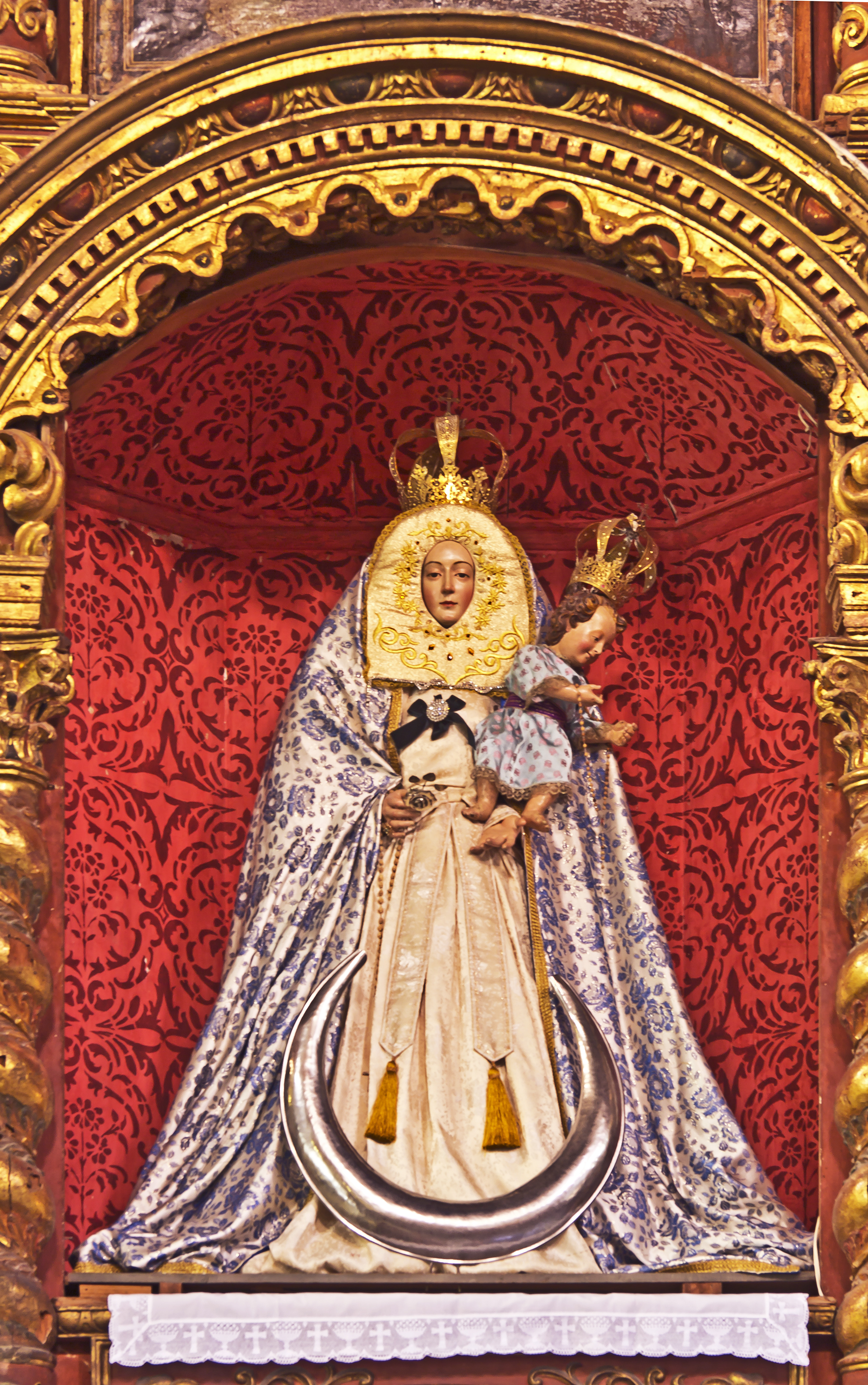
Our Lady of Consolation enshrined within the Church of Saint Francis, Tenerife, Spain

The feast of Our Lady of Consolation is observed in several Catholic countries within orders or religious institutes.

- The Order of Saint Augustine observe it on September 4.
- The Order of Friars Minor Conventual observe it on May 25
- The Order of Saint Benedict on July 5.

In Malta, the feast is celebrated on the last Sunday of October with pyrotechnic displays by Our Lady of Consolation Fireworks Factory. The Feast Day in Rome for Our Lady of Consolation is January 31; in the United States it is the Saturday after the Feast of Saint Augustine (August 28).

== Argentina ==
Pope Benedict XVI granted a decree of canonical coronation for the venerated 17th—century image of Our Lady of Consolation in Sumampa, Argentina, on 21 November 2009.

Pope Francis issued a decree to raise the shrine in Sampacho to the status of a minor basilica on 12 March 2024 for the Diocese of Villa de la Concepción del Río Cuarto. The inauguration rites took place on 10 June 2024 and was presided by the Archbishop of Cordoba, Cardinal Ángel Sixto Rossi.

== Belgium ==
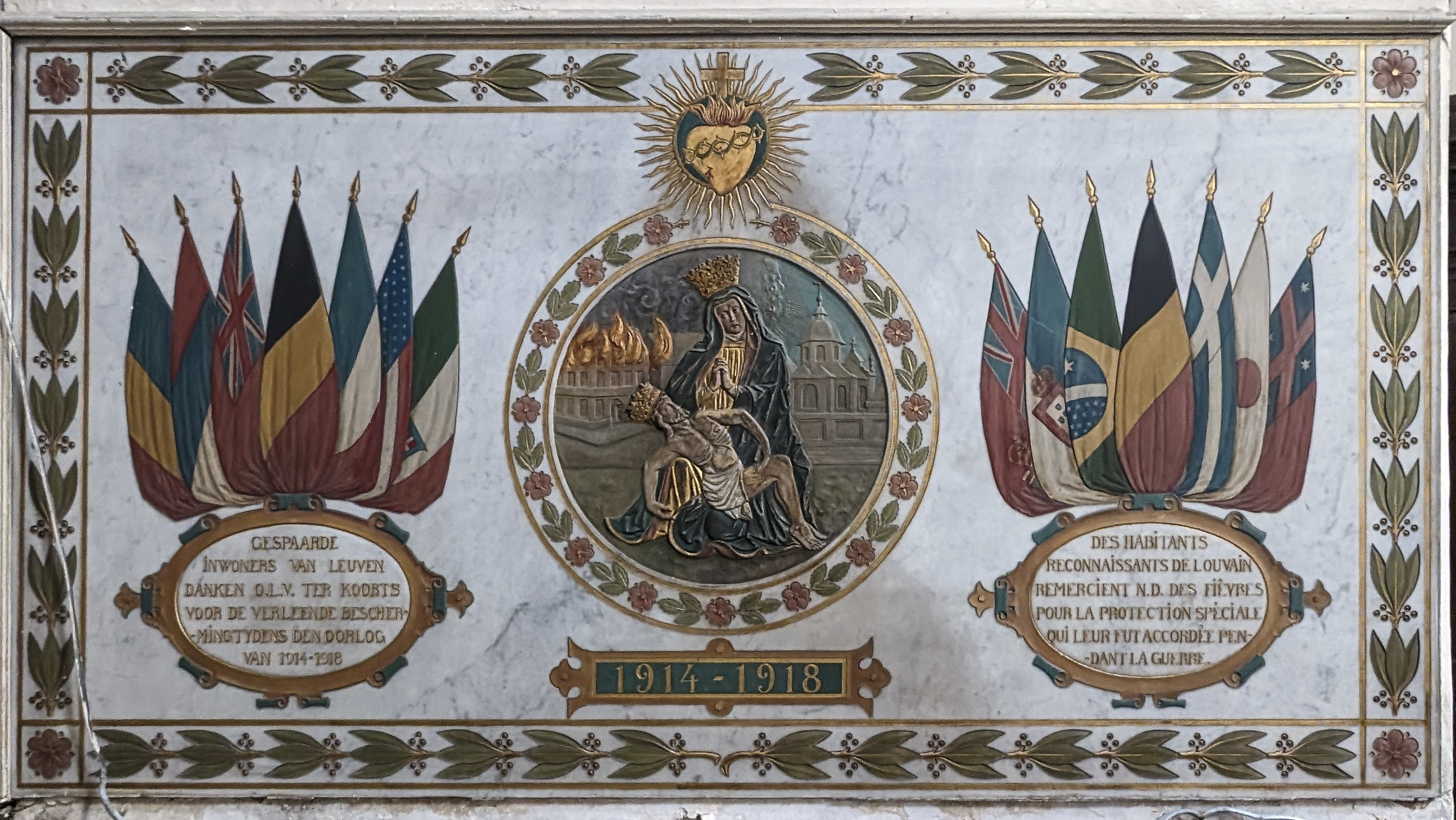
The venerated Pieta image of Leuven, Belgium

Pope Pius X granted a decree of pontifical coronation on 16 June 1907 towards a Pietà image dating from 1535 in the Franciscan church of Leuven. The rite of coronation was executed by the former Archbishop of Mechelen, Cardinal Désiré-Joseph Mercier. The image, also known as "Our Lady of Koorts" or "Our Lady of Fever" due to its longstanding claim to heal the sick, was renamed Our Lady of Consolation of the Afflicted by popular demand.

Pope Benedict XVI issued a Pontifical decree which raised the shrine of Onze-Lieve-Vrouw ten Troost in Vilvoorde to the status of Minor Basilica on 1 March 2006.

== England ==
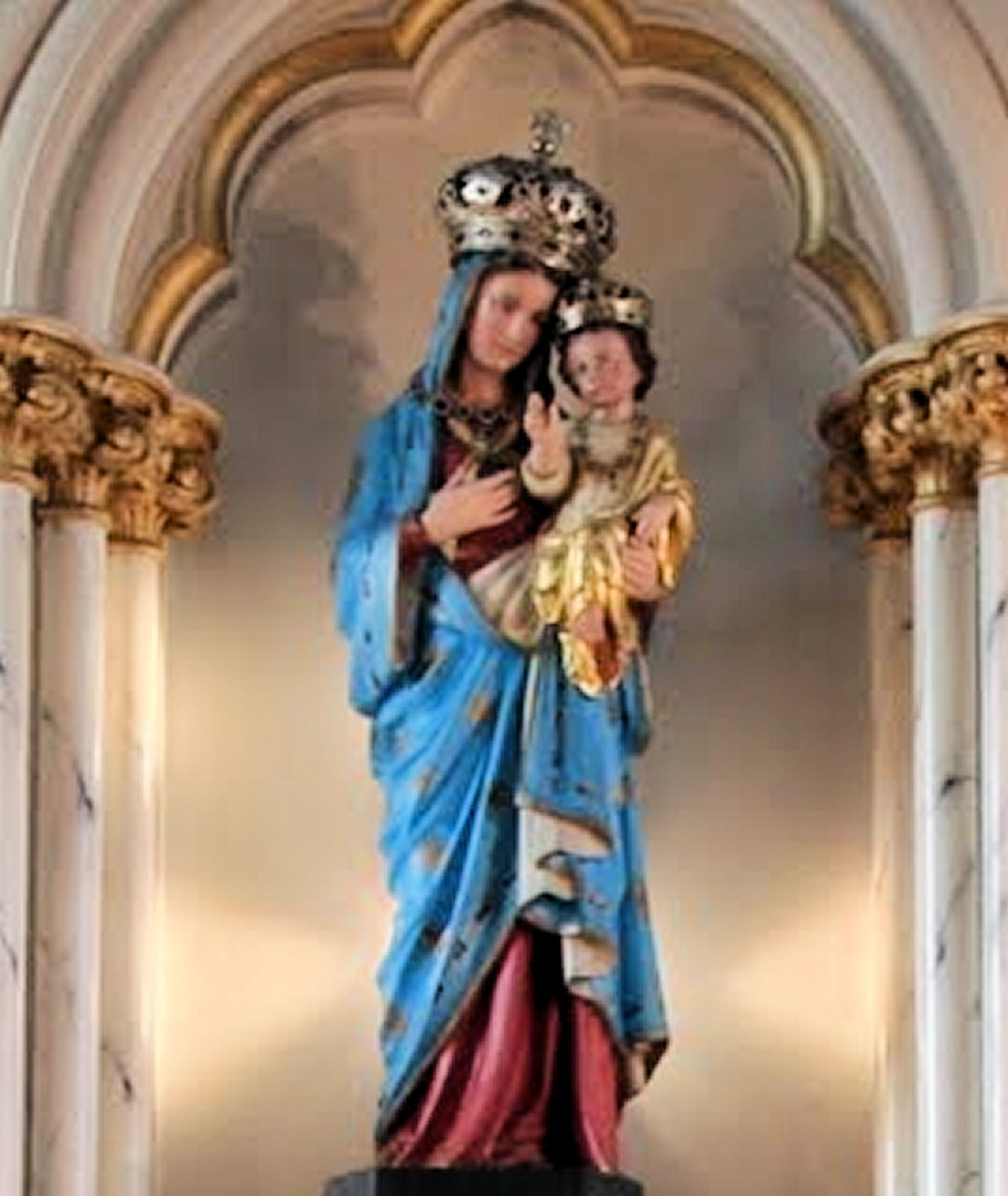
The canonically crowned image at the Shrine of Our Lady of Consolation in West Grinstead, England

The Shrine of Our Lady of Consolation in West Grinstead, in the Diocese of Arundel and Brighton dates from 1876 and is the first shrine in honour of the Blessed Virgin Mary to be established in England since before the Protestant Reformation.

Pope Leo XIII granted this venerated image a decree of pontifical coronation, executed by the former Bishop of Southwark, John Baptiste Butt on 12 July 1893.

== France ==
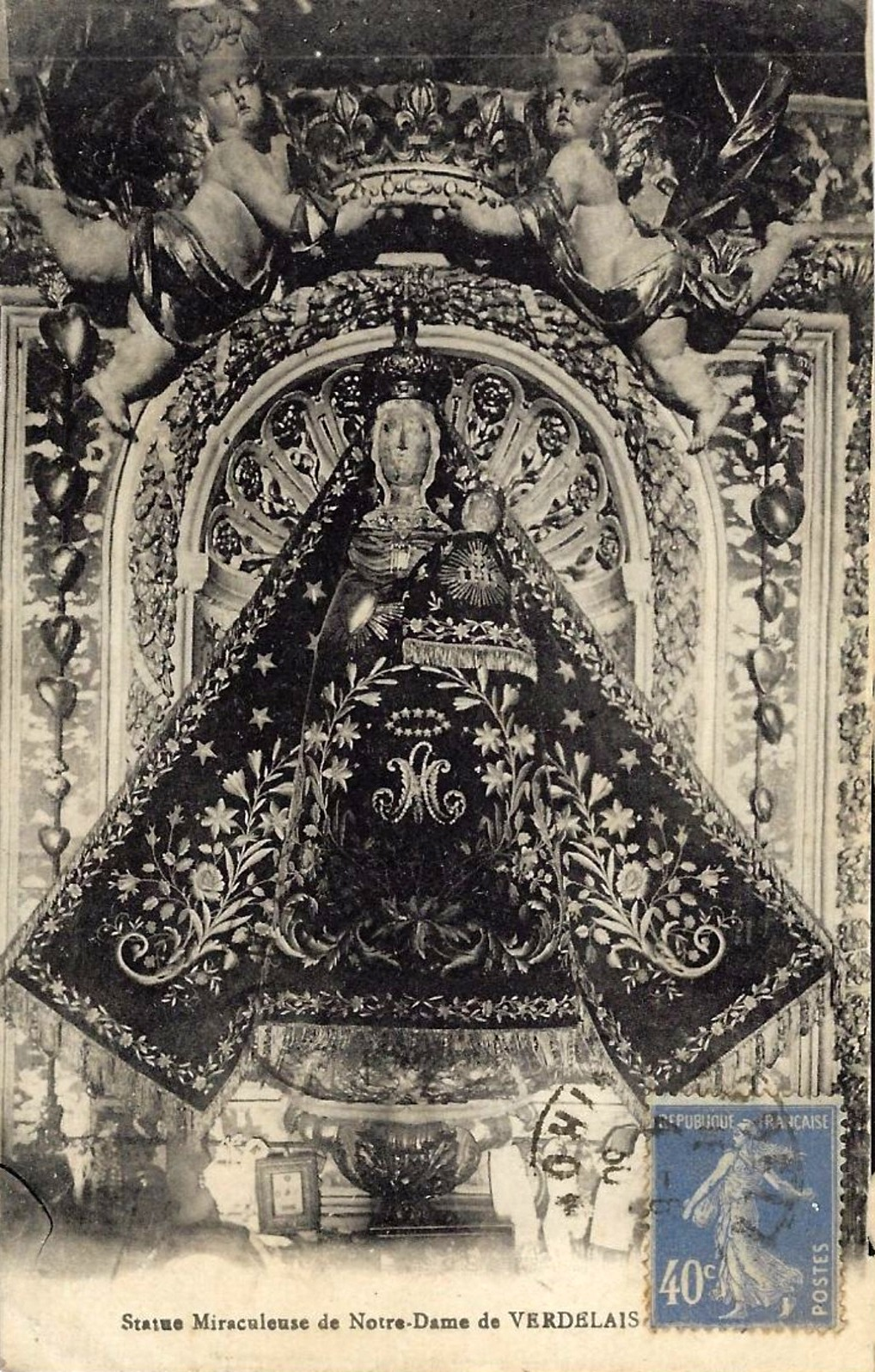
Our Lady of Consolation of the Afflicted in Verdelais

Stanbrook Abbey was founded in 1623 at Cambrai, France as the monastery of "Our Lady of Consolation", for English Catholic expatriates.

- Pope Innocent X encouraged the devotion to Our Lady, Comforter of the Afflicted by establishing a French confraternity in 1652.
- Pope Pius IX granted a canonical coronation to an image in Verdelais on 2 July 1856.
- Pope Pius X granted a decree of coronation to another image venerated in Hyeres on 21 June 1909.
- Pope Pius XI raised the shrine in Verdelais to the status of Minor basilica via the Pontifical decree Exstat in Civitate on 1 February 1924.

The dioceses of Vannes, Valence, Montpelier, Laval, Nantes, Périgueux, Tours and many others, dedicated churches or chapels to Our Lady of Consolation.

The French painter and artisan, William-Adolphe Bouguereau painted the image Mater Afflictorum in 1875, featuring the Blessed Virgin Mary along with a lacrimating woman and deceased male child. It is housed in Musée des Arts décoratifs, Strasbourg, in Alsace, France.

== Germany ==
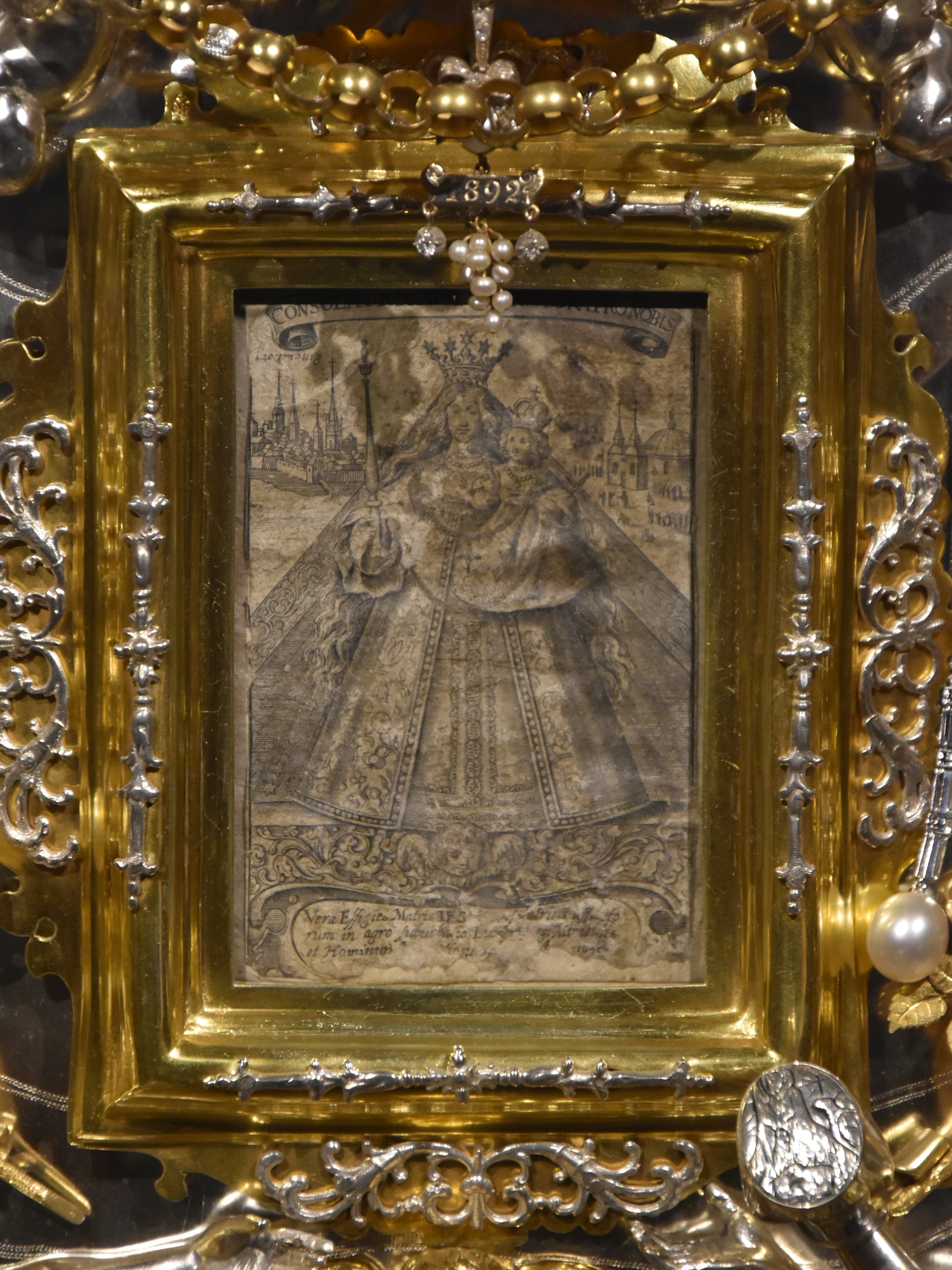
Our Lady of Kevelaer wearing her marked golden Pontifical crown from 1 June 1892

Our Lady, the Consoler of the Afflicted is venerated in the Marian Basilica of Kevelaer. In 1642 a copperplate engraving, representing Our Lady of Luxembourg, was installed in a sanctuary erected the same year. It is one of the best visited Catholic pilgrimage locations in north-western Europe.

- Pope Benedict XIV — granted its pilgrims abundant indulgences on 24 August 1740.
- Pope Gregory XVI — extended more titles to the image on 14 June 1840.
- Pope Leo XIII — granted a decree of pontifical coronation on 20 July 1890 and was crowned on 1 June 1892.
- Pope Pius XI — issued a Pontifical decree In Civitate Appellata which raised her sanctuary to the status of Basilica on 23 April 1923, the decree was signed by Vatican Secretary of State, Cardinal Pietro Gasparri.
- Pope John Paul II — visited the shrine on 2 May 1987.

== Iran ==
The Cathedral of the Consolata, Tehran is a Latin rite church which is devoted to Our Lady of Consolation.

== Italy ==
=== Bedonia ===
Pope John Paul II issued a Pontifical decree titled Progredientibus iam Plurium on 1 September 1978 which raised the sanctuary to the status of a Minor Basilica in Bedonia, Parma.

=== Casalbuono ===
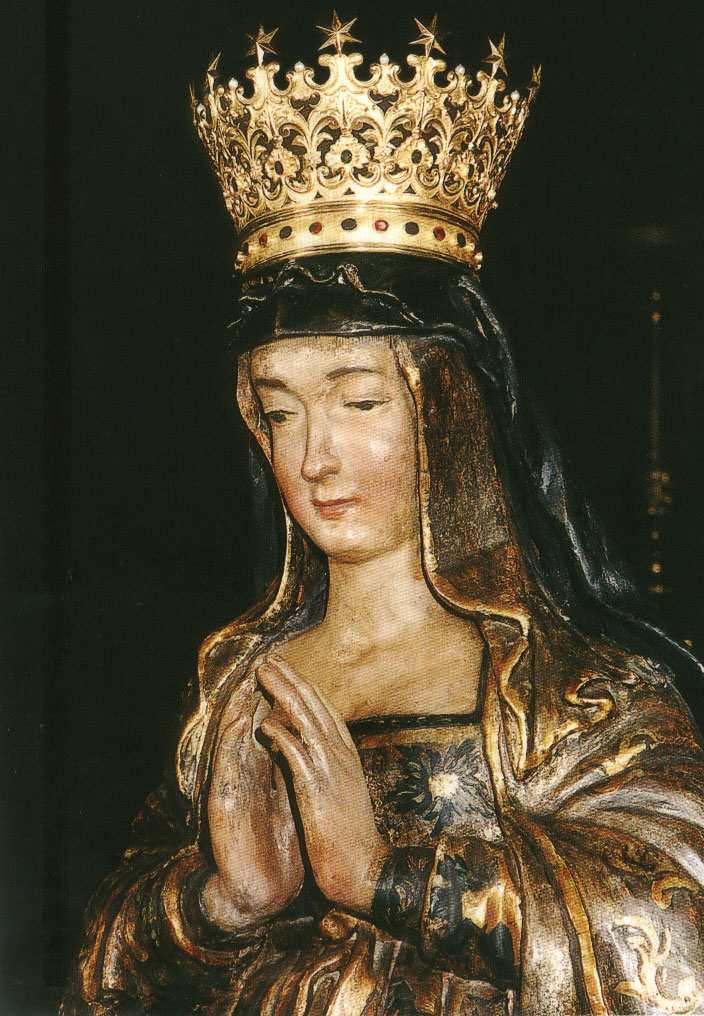
The image enshrined in Nereto, Teramo, Italy

The devotion to Our Lady of Consolation in Casalbuono began when her image was introduced to the laity during the 19th century. Her shrine sits on top of Mount Difesa, which was built around the 18th century, to replace the older structure that was destroyed. It has since attracted pilgrims and become customary that the image be translated from the town parish church to her sanctuary during its feast days.

Pope Benedict XVI decreed the canonical coronation of the image on 28 August 2010 through the Dicastery for Divine Worship and the Discipline of the Sacraments. The rite of coronation was executed by the former Archbishop of Palermo, Cardinal Salvatore de Giorgi on 11 September 2010.

=== Nereto ===
The image of Our Lady in Nereto recalls the invasion of the former Emperor of France, Lord Napoleon Bonaparte on 22 December 1798. Several soldiers of the Napoleonic Army raped and pillaged women in Nereto, and the townspeople retaliated against the army via murder. The army proceeded to charge into the town church of Nereto where a woman, Nicolina Tonelli had rung the bell and purported to release angels from the bell tower of the church which fended off the soldiers and purportedly dislodged their bullets. This claim of miraculous event is now commemorated annually on December 22 and is also memorialized in the same bell. The local townspeople later crowned the image by popular demand and further credited her for the miraculous repulsion of the Napoleonic Army.

=== Reggio Calabria ===
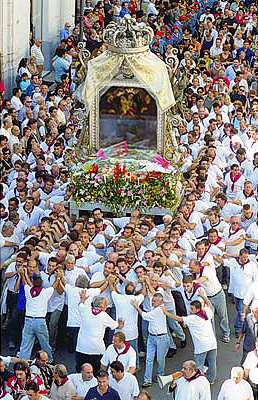
Procession with the statue of 1547 in Reggio Calabria, Italy

The devotion started when the Bishop of Cavaillon, Girolamo Cancelli invited twelve friars of the Order of Capuchins to the site donated by the Italian nobleman Giovanni Bernardo Mileto where an existing smaller statue was already enshrined. They finished a cloister in 1569 using the new rules of the Franciscan Order.

The Italian nobleman Lord Camillo Diano tasked the artisan Nicolò Andrea Capriolo in 1547 to make a larger image under this title. The canvas depicts Mary seated on a throne holding the Child Jesus and flanked by Saint Francis of Assisi holding a cross and a Bible and Saint Anthony of Padua holding a Lily flower and Christian book while a pair of Angels crown the head of Our Lady.

According to pious legend, this large painting mysteriously disappeared from its original place in Reggio Calabria Cathedral, only to be re-discovered by a young shepherd on the nearby hill of Eremo. The painting was brought back to the cathedral, only to be found again on the same hill. The faithful took this as a supernatural sign from the Blessed Virgin Mary and built a church on the exact site where the icon had appeared. The image remains today in what is known as the Basilica of Our Lady of Consolation in Eremo, Calabria. The first organized procession was recorded in 1636. The local townspeople decorated the image with silver crowns on their own accord on 10 November 1693 in thanksgiving for the earthquake relief in January 1693. These crowns are now located on the backside panel of the framed image.

Pope Innocent XIII granted the image a canonical coronation on 15 September 1722 with ornate crowns offered by the Vatican Chapter, currently installed on the image.

The local government further decreed the Marian title as their city patroness on 26 August 1752. The church was originally dedicated to Saint Theodore the Martyr and Saint Catherine of Alexandria but the enshrinement of the image dedicated it to Our Lady of Consolation of the Afflicted by popular demand. The church was completely damaged due to earthquake in 1908 and was rebuilt in 1965. A new altar was made and modern bronze panels were crafted by Italian artist Alessandro Monteleone (1897–1967).

Pope Paul VI raised the shrine to the status of Minor Basilica via the decree Rhegium Urbs on 28 November 1971. The image was stolen from its shrine on 17 August 1982 but was returned a few days later due to great public outcry.

=== Palatine Hill ===
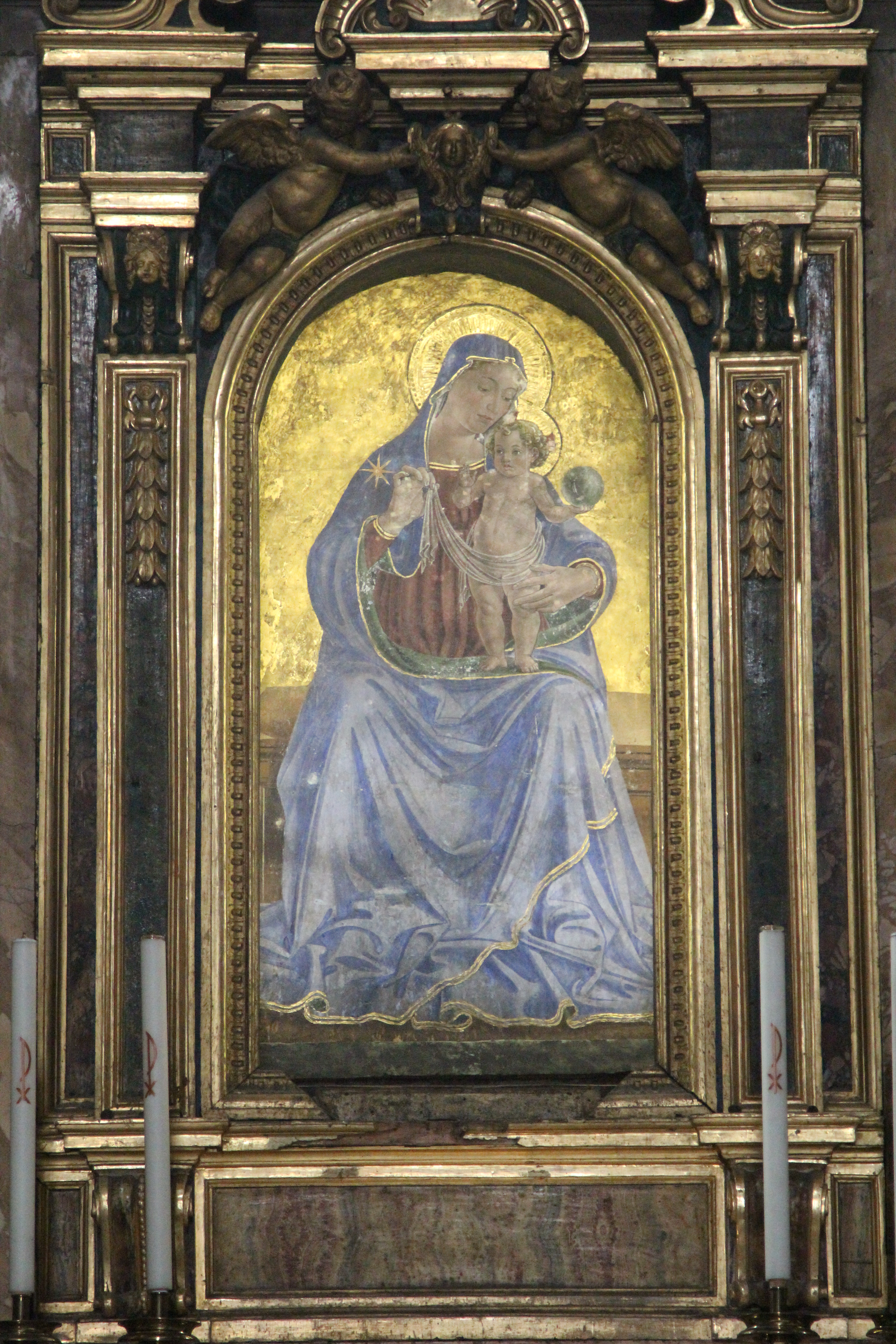
The image venerated in Santa Maria della Consolazione in the Palatine Hill. Pope Urban VIII crowned this image on 7 December 1634.

Another image in Rome is enshrined since 23 June 1385, a condemned prisoner named Giordanello degli Alberini was in the Campidoglio waiting to be executed, entrusts his testamentary dispositions to the Roman notary Pietro Mancini. Among which he donates two gold florins to have an image of Our Lady painted to be placed in the place of executions in front of the gallows, next to Santa Maria delle Grazie under Mount Campidoglio. The painting was created and placed on the wall of some barns of the Mattei family in Vico Jugario. It represents the Virgin seated with the child standing on her knees in the act of benediction and supporting her globe. The image was restored and repainted by the Roman artisan Antoniazzo Romano several times in 1465.

On 7 June 1470, the purported miracle of the Virgin Mary took place. According to Giovanni Antonio Bruzio, on that road corresponding to the ancient vico iugario there were the granaries of the Mattei Roman patricians. In their portico there was an image of the Holy Virgin, to whom a pious mother recommended herself, whose innocent son had been imprisoned and sentenced to death for evildoings, the Virgin told him, consoling her, that her son would not die, but miraculously saved from the forces. After this the faithful often offered gifts to this image and it was entrusted to the confraternity of Santa Maria in Portico. Near those granaries there was also a small hospital, near which a church dedicated to Our Lady, the Santa Maria della Consolazione was later built.

Pope Sixtus V recognized the pious association under this Marian title on 3 June 1585 and issued a Pontifical decree titled Licet ex Debito which elevated their status to an Archconfraternity.

Pope Urban VIII further approved the venerated image recognized by the Vatican Chapter, which was promoted by Count Alessandro Sforza and Pontifically crowned on 7 December 1634.

=== Salerno ===
Another image was honored a canonical coronation by Pope Pius X decreeing the coronation on 30 June 1906. The rite of coronation was executed by the former Archbishop of Salerno, Valerio Laspro on 1 October 1906 for the image venerated in the Church of Our Lady of Consolation in San Valentino Torio.

=== Turin ===
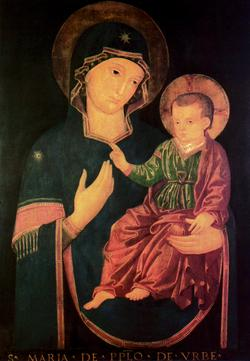
The venerated image of Augustina Domina Taurinorum (English: Noble Mistress of Turin). The bottom inscription reads Sancta Maria de Populo de Urbe (Latin: Holy Mary of the City and its Peoples).

A church at the site stood adjacent to the ancient Roman walls of the city. Pious legends claim that Saint Eusebius of Vercelli brought back an icon of Our Lady of Consolation when he was returning from exile in Alexandria, Egypt in 363 A.D. This venerated icon was presented to the city of Turin. Later on Bishop Maximus of Turin established a small shrine to house the icon in a church dedicated to Saint Andrew the Apostle.

Pope Pius X granted a decree of pontifical coronation for the image on 18 June 1904. Its golden aureole halo of twenty-four stars was donated by former Queen of Italy, Margherita of Savoy while the rest of its regalia were donated from the princes of Savoy and noble ladies of Turin. The rite of coronation was granted to and executed by the former Prefect of the Sacred Congregation of the Index, Cardinal Vincenzo Vannutelli in a public religious event. A grand total of six Cardinals attended the rite of coronation, including Cardinal Giulio Boschi (Ferrara), Giuseppe Callegari (Padua), Alfonso Capecelatro (Capua), Andrea Carlo Ferrari (Milan), and Domenico Svampa (Bologna).

Pope Pius X raised the shrine Santuario della Consolata to status of Minor Basilica on 7 April 1906. He later issued the decree Virginis a Consolatione Templum for this shrine which approved the Archconfraternity of the devotion on 25 July 1912.

Saint Joseph Marello attributed his recovery from typhus to Our Lady of Consolation. In 1878, he founded the Oblates of Saint Joseph.

In the 20th century, the rector of the Santuario della Consolata, Giuseppe Allamano, founded the Congregation of Clerics of Consolata Missionaries in 1902. These Christian missionaries later brought the Marian devotion the peoples of Africa.

== Japan ==
The Augustinian church located in the Shiroyama district of Nagasaki, Japan, is dedicated to Our Mother of Consolation.

== Luxembourg ==
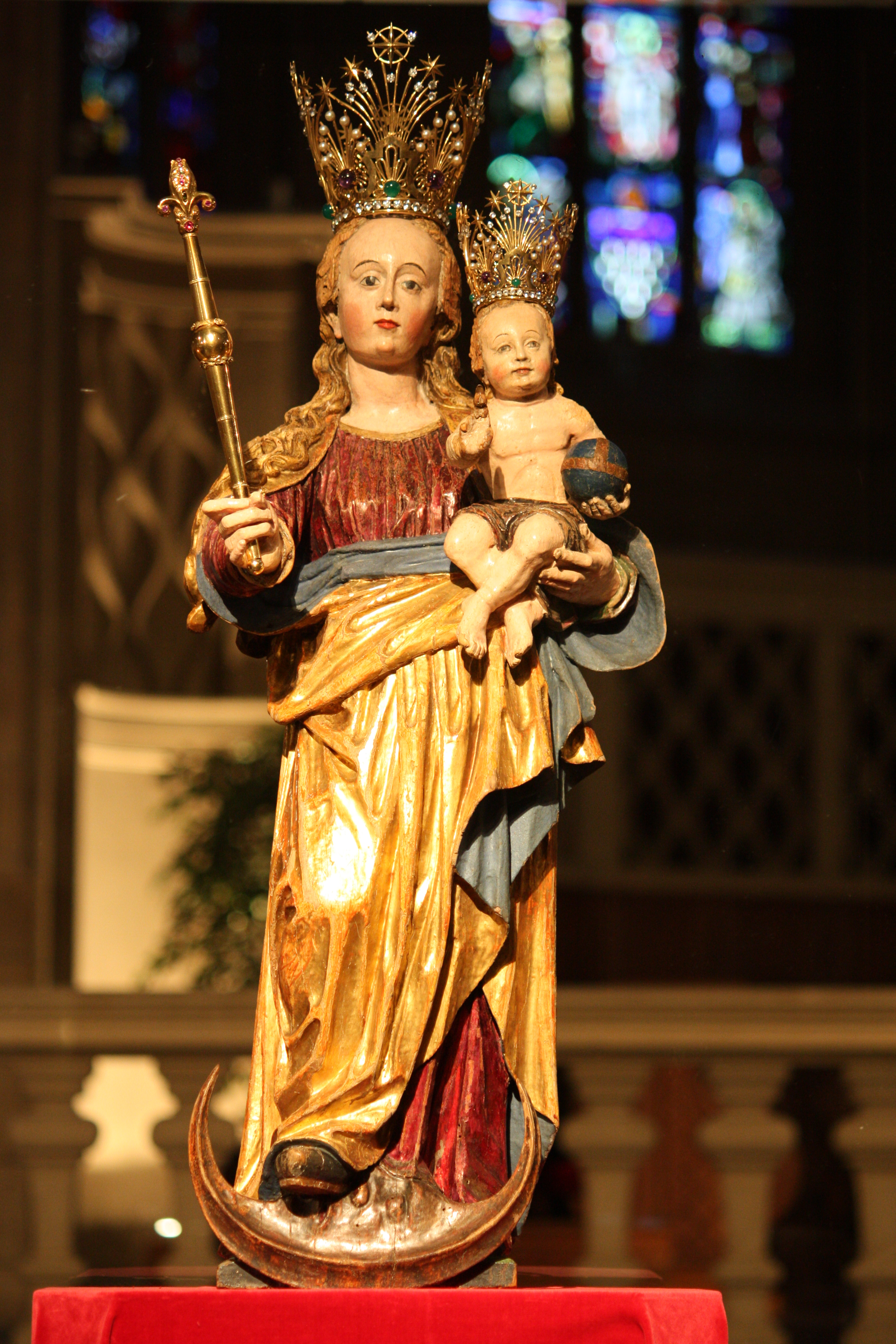
La Consolatrix Afflictorum du Luxembourg in the Royal Cathedral of Luxembourg crowned by the decree of Pope Pius IX in 1866

The devotion to Our Lady of Luxembourg, Comforter of the Afflicted, was initiated by the Jesuit Order on 8 December 1624 and led to the election of Our Lady as the protectress of the city on 27 September 1666 and of the duchy on 20 February 1678.

The image celebrates her feast on two calendar occasions, the 15 of September and on the Friday of Sorrows.

After the destruction of the old pilgrimage chapel at the time of the French Revolution, the statue of Our Lady of Luxembourg was moved to the high altar of the former Church of Saint Peter, today renamed as the Notre-Dame Cathedral in Luxembourg City.

Statues depicting her can be found in niches in buildings throughout the city of Luxembourg. From there the devotion was adopted by the English Benedictine nuns of Cambrai, France. It is solemnly celebrated during the Feast of Oktav.

Pope Pius IX granted a Pontifical decree of coronation towards this national image on 24 June 1866. The rite of coronation was executed by the former Archbishop of Munich, Cardinal Karl-August von Reisach on 2 July 1866. It was professionally restored in 2008 by the artisan Muriel Prieur. This devotion was later expanded in 1875 to Carey, Ohio, United States where a basilica enshrines a statue.

Pope Francis presented a Golden Rose to the Marian statue on 26 September 2024, in conclusion of the meeting in the Notre Dame Cathedral of Luxembourg with the catholic community and national authorities.

== Malta ==
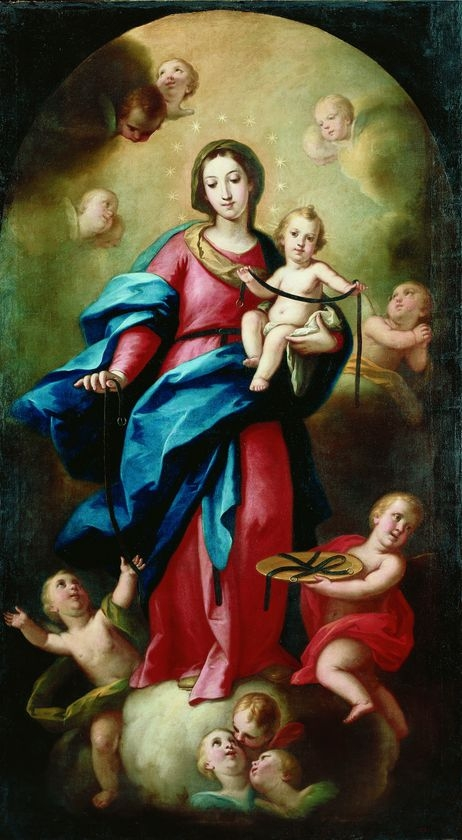
The Virgin of Consolation (1760) by Jose Vergara Gimeno (1726–1799). Oil on canvas.

In the 1700s, members of the Augustinian Order introduced the devotion to Our Lady of Consolation to the island of Malta. On 1 December 1722, the Prior General of the Augustinian Order, Thomas Cervioni, issued the decree for the erection of the Confraternity of Our Lady of Consolation in the Church of Saint Mark, operated by the Augustinian Order at Rabat, Malta.

By this time the pious custom of asking for the final benediction before death in the name of this Marian title became very popular, and the friars were given a dispensation to leave the monastery at any time to confer it. Eventually, Marian processions were suspended during the French occupation of 1798 to discourage the gathering of crowds.

A venerated image is enshrined at the Church of Saint Augustine in Valletta, Malta which features the Marian apparition to Saint Monica receiving the Holy Cincture. The image was painted in 1786 by the Maltese artisan Hermenegildus Grech.

== Philippines ==
=== Bulacan ===
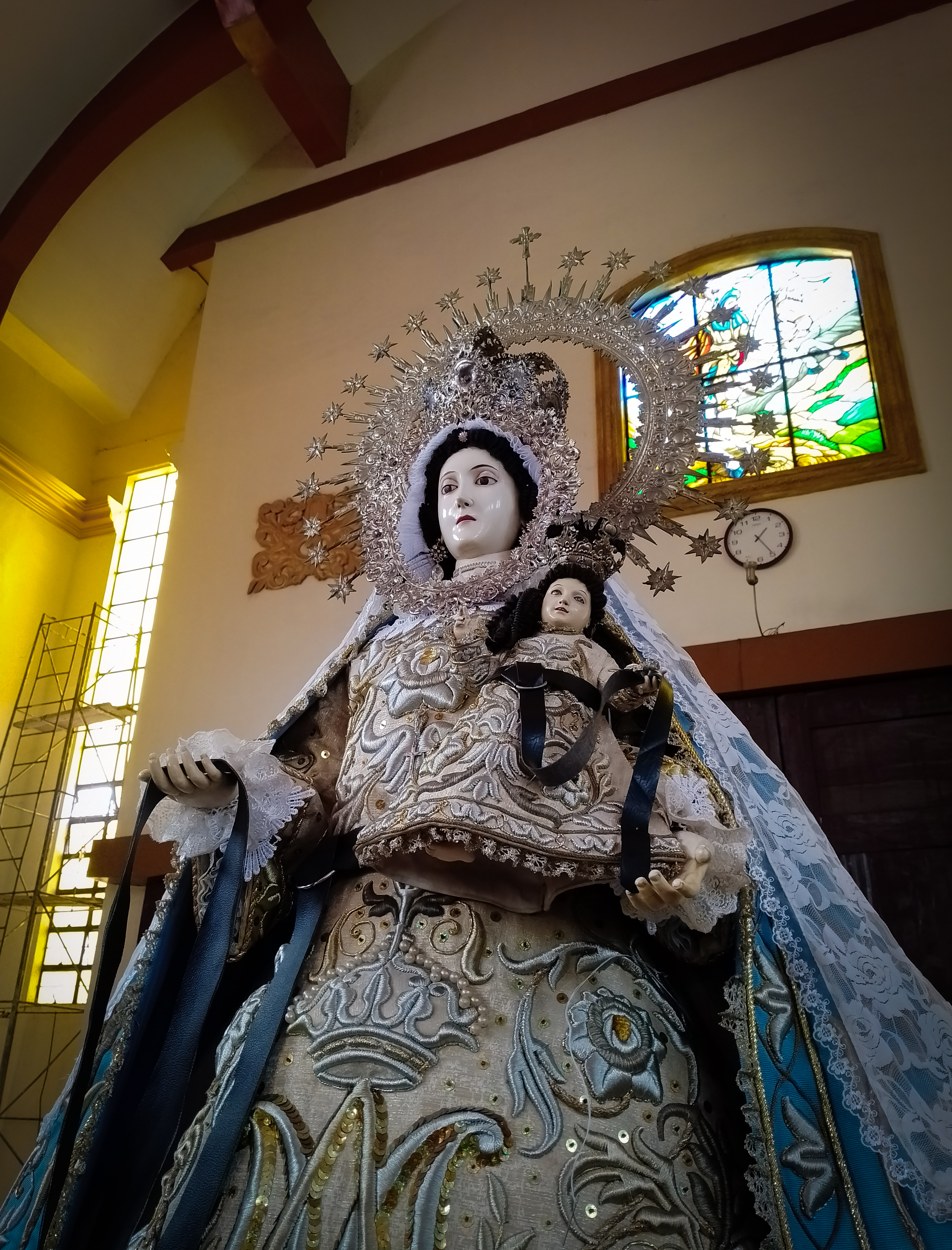
The image in Paombong, Bulacan, Philippines

The town of Paombong was established as a Catholic parish in 1639, and the devotion was introduced and propagated by the Augustinian friars. In 1974, a confraternity of Our Lady of Consolation was established. In 1988, she was declared as the secondary patroness of Paombong. On 5 December 2023, the city declared her as the "Mother and Comforting Queen of Paombong” and will be episcopally crowned on 6 September 2026.

=== Manila ===
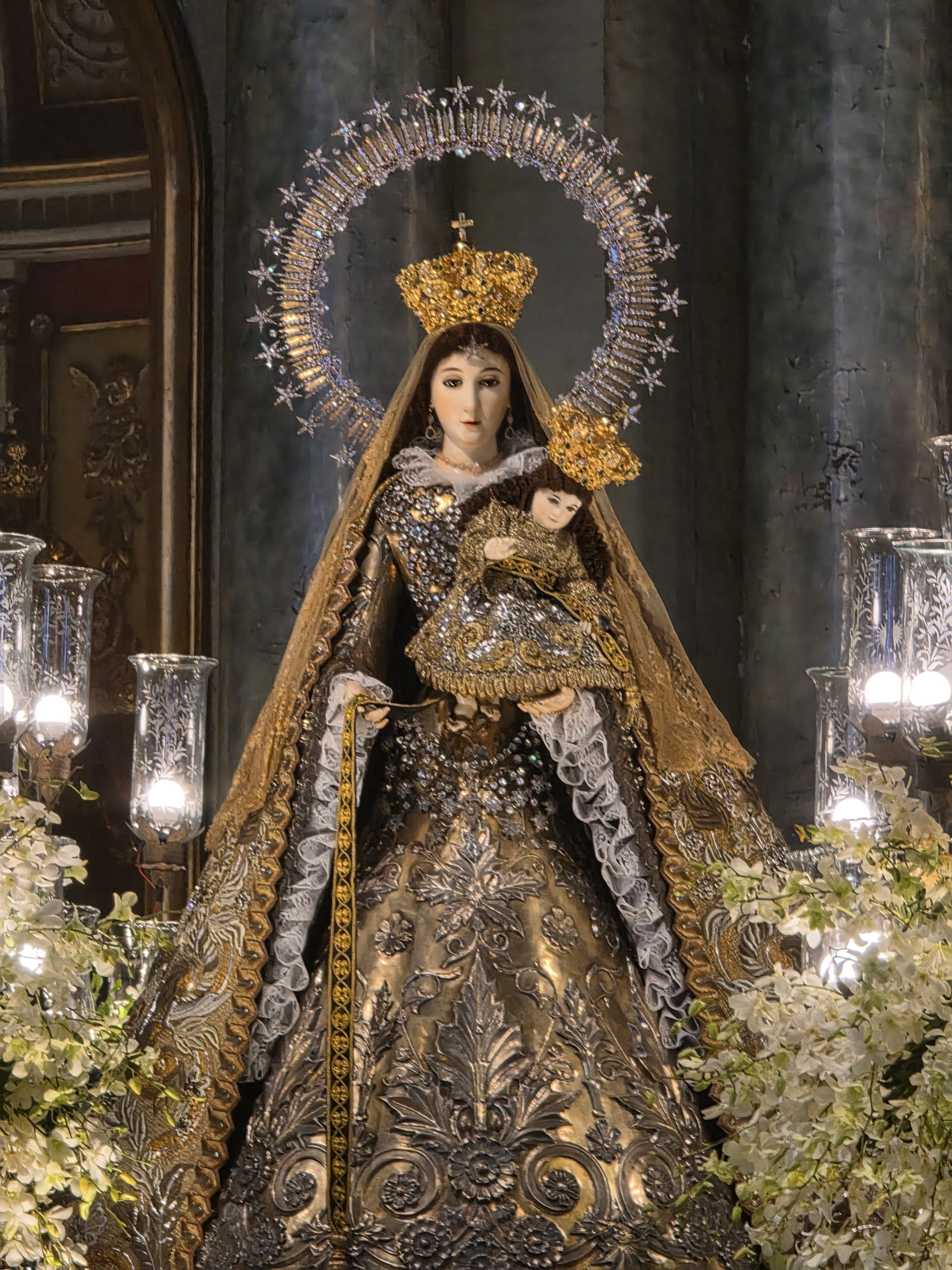
The image of Our Lady of Consolation and Cincture in the Church of Saint Augustine, Intramuros, Philippines

In 1607, the Confraternity of the Cofradia de la Nuestra Señora de la Consolacion y Correa was founded in Intramuros, Manila being one of the oldest Marian confraternities in the country. The image survived the Second World War being hidden for safekeeping.

Pope John Paul II issued a pontifical decree of canonical coronation towards the image on 12 June 1999. The rite of coronation was executed by the former Archbishop of Manila, Cardinal Jaime Lachica Sin on 4 September 2000. The San Agustin Church was also designated as the Archdiocesan Shrine of Our Lady of Consolation and Cincture.

On 13 February 2004, the original image of the Christ Child attached to Our Lady was stolen, but was later replaced with a replica. On 15 August 2024, the Manila City Council passed an ordinance formally declaring the image as the patroness of Intramuros, Manila. The image celebrated the 25th anniversary of its Pontifical coronation on 4 September 2025, held at Plaza Roma, Intramuros, Manila.

=== Palawan ===
The Marian devotion in Cuyo, Palawan began when the image is brought by the Augustinian Recollects in 1623. The image was episcopally crowned on 27 August 2022, coinciding with the fourth centenary of Christianity in the island of Palawan.

== Poland ==
Several images of the Blessed Virgin Mary under the title of Our Lady of Consolation have been honored by several popes and are venerated throughout Poland.

- Pope Benedict XIV — honored the miraculous icon in the Monastery of the Bernardine Fathers in Leżajsk with a pontifical decree of coronation. It was canonically crowned on 8 September 1752.
- Pope John XXIII — granted a decree of coronation for Nowy Sącz on 10 August 1963.
- Pope Paul VI - issued a Pontifical decree Propugnaculum Fidei Artisque which raised the shrine of Abbey Church, Czerwińsk nad Wisłą to the status of Minor Basilica on 10 July 1967, acknowledging the image enshrined within. The image was granted a Pontifical decree of coronation titled Didicimus in Templum on 2 February 1969, signed and notarized by the former Dean of the College of Cardinals, Luigi Traglia. The rite of coronation was executed on 6 September 1970.

The same Pontiff granted a decree of coronation for the images

  - in Dąbrówka Kościelna, canonically crowned on 15 June 1969.
  - in Golina, canonically crowned on 23 August 1970.
  - in Szamotuły, canonically crowned on 20 September 1970.
  - in Jodłowa, canonically crowned on 31 August 1975.
  - in Biechowo, canonically crowned on 12 September 1976.
  - in the Parish of the Nativity of Stara Blotnica, canonically crowned on 21 August 1977.
- Pope John Paul II — granted a decree of coronation for the images
  - in Orchówek crowned by pontifical decree Sæpe Nos Memoria on 26 March 1987. The rite of coronation was executed on 2 September 1990.
  - in Pasierbiec via the decree Notum est Christifideles on 6 August 1992. The rite of coronation canonically crowned on 28 August 1993.
  - In the Franciscan Church and monastery of Gniezno, via the decree Mater Iesu in Historiam on 20 November 1990. The rite of coronation was executed on 3 June 1997.
  - In the Church of the Annunciation of Miedzna, icon via the decree Lucis Matrem Fecundam on 5 September 1996. The rite of coronation was executed on 22 June 1997.
  - In the Church of the Holy Trinity in Lubiszewo Tczewskie, via the decree Vivens est Maria on 6 March 1997. The rite of coronation was executed on 31 August 1997.
  - In Domaniewice, icon venerated as "Comforter of the Afflicted" was canonically crowned on 8 September 1999.
  - In the Church of Saint Catherine of Alexandria of Kraków, image canonically crowned on 9 December 2000 (Great Jubilee Year).
  - In the Church of Saint Stephen of Kraków, canonically crowned on 12 September 2002.
- Pope Benedict XVI granted a decree of coronation for the icon in Bęczkowice on 16 November 2006 through the Congregation for Divine Worship. It was canonically crowned on 8 September 2007.
- Pope Francis — raised the shrine to the status of Minor Basilica in Poznań, on 13 May 2014.

He later granted a decree of coronation for the images

  - in Wiele, Pomeranian Voivodeship, Calvary chapel, which was canonically crowned on 28 May 2017.
  - in Kombornia, canonically crowned on 11 June 2017.
  - in the coastal Basilica of Gdynia, image canonically crowned on 12 June 2022.

== Spain ==
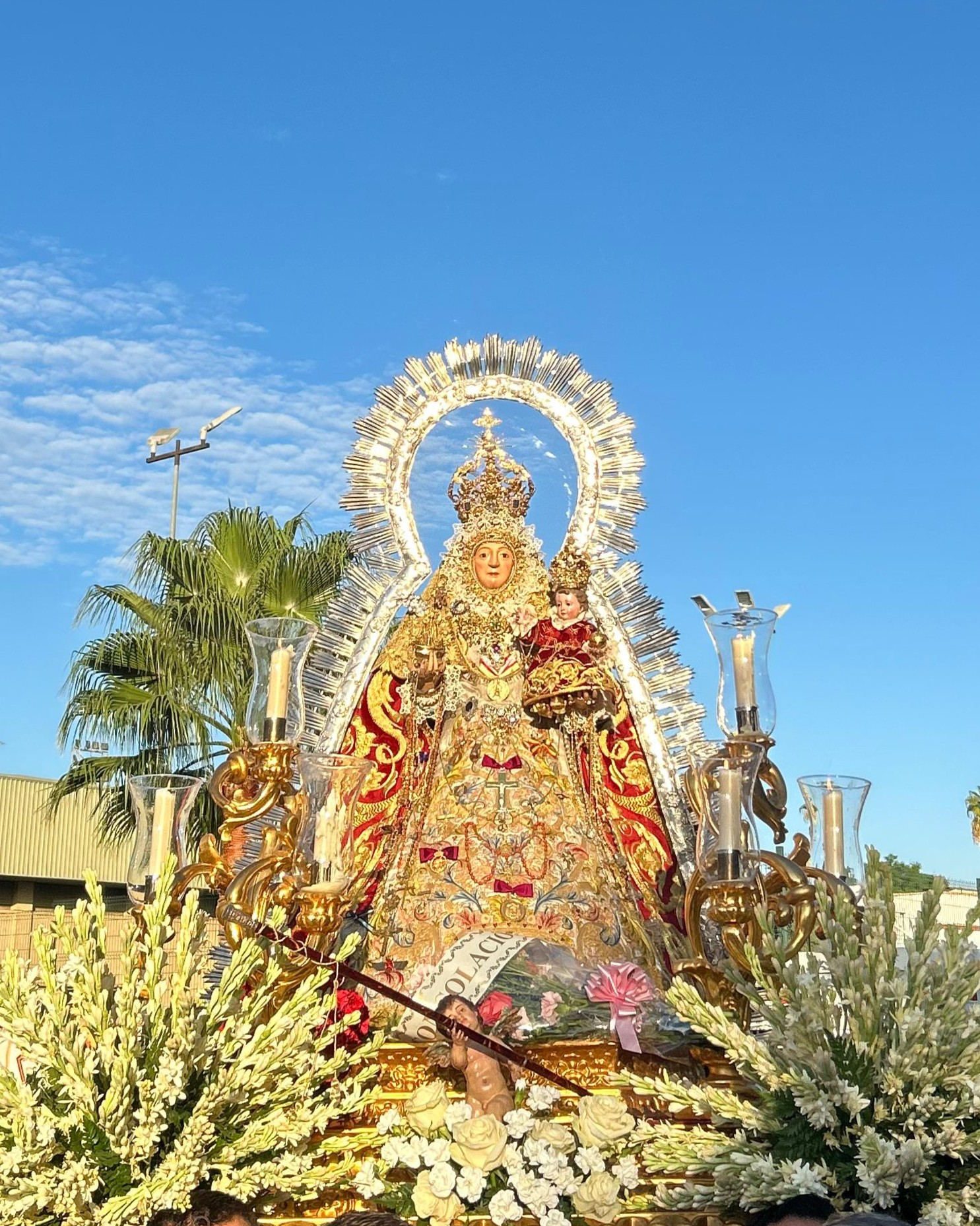
Image in Utrera, crowned by the Pontifical decree of Pope Paul VI

=== Utrera, Seville ===
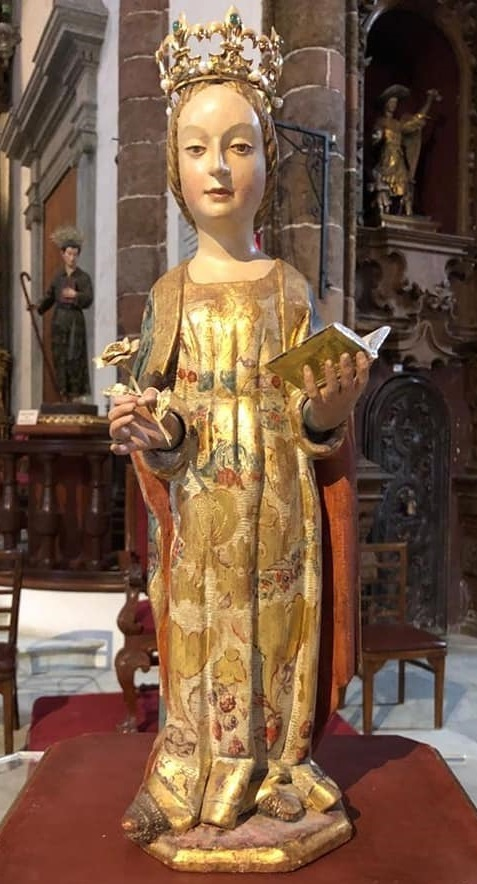
The Patronal image of the Virgin of Consolation (15th century) brought by the Spaniard Conquistador Alonso Fernández de Lugo in Santa Cruz de Tenerife

The venerated image of Our Lady of Consolation is a small carving of the seated virgin in the late Byzantine style, which dates back to the end of the 14th century, although its external appearance was later modified to adapt it to the tastes of the baroque prevailing in lower Andalusia.

Pope Paul VI signed the formal decree officially granting the canonical coronation of the statue on 7 July 1963. Within less than a year, the rite of coronation was executed on 1 May 1964 at the Plaza del Altozano.

Pope John Paul II later issued a Pontifical decree Populum et Fideles Christianorum on 7 March 1989 declaring this Marian title as the official city patroness of Utrera.

=== Valdepeñas, Ciudad Real ===
According to pious legend, the original Marian image was discovered in 1212, when the province of La Mancha was reconquered after the Christian victory in Battle of Las Navas de Tolosa and a chapel was later built in her honor.

Pope Francis decreed the coronation of the image on 30 November 2016. The rite of coronation was executed on 1 June 2019 by the Bishop of Ciudad Real, Gerardo Melgar Viciosa.

== United States ==
In 1848, Luxembourgish immigrants began to settle in the area around Dacada, Wisconsin. The eldest statue of Our Lady of Consolation in the United States was brought by a Luxembourg immigrant, Anna Margaret Deppiesse, in 1849 and later donated to Saint Nicholas Church.

During the American Civil War, three parishioners of Saint Augustine's Parish in Leopold, Indiana, fought for the North and were imprisoned at Andersonville Prison. Former Belgian nationals, Henry Devillez, Isidore Naviaux and Lambert Rogier, vowed that if they survived, one of them would make a pilgrimage to Luxembourg and obtain a copy of the statue of Our Lady of Consolation that stood in their ancestral church. Rogier went to Luxembourg in 1867 and upon his return in 1875 then enshrined it in Saint Augustine Church, where it now stands to the left of the main altar. In September 2013, the Archbishop of Indianapolis, Cardinal Joseph William Tobin dedicated a larger outdoor garden shrine.

One of the two main celebrations held each year in the Tacony section of Philadelphia was Our Lady of Consolation's Feast Day Parade. (The other is Memorial Day.) Each July statues of the saints were paraded through the streets of the neighborhood.

Pope Paul VI raised the shrine to the status of a Minor Basilica in Carey, Ohio, via his Pontifical decree Quam Prope Assit on 21 October 1971. The decree was signed and notarized by the Dean of the College of Cardinals and Grand Chancellor of the Apostolic Briefs, Cardinal Luigi Traglia. Today, the Basilica and National Shrine of Our Lady of Consolation is administered by the Order of Saint Francis.

== Venezuela ==
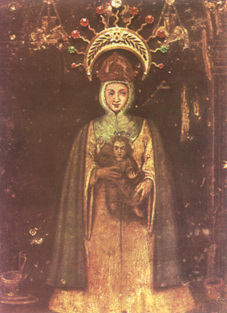
The Pontifically crowned image enshrined at the Basilica of Our Lady of Consolation, Táriba, Venezuela

An image dating from the sixteenth century is also enshrined in Tariba, Venezuela. The image is framed in solid gold with jewels donated by pious Marian devotees from the country.

Pope John XXIII raised the Marian shrine to the status of Minor Basilica via his Pontifical Decree Solacium ac Levationem on 20 October 1959. The same Pontiff later granted a pontifical decree of coronation titled Alacres Dei on 9 November 1959 towards the image enshrined at the Basilica of Our Lady of Consolation, Táriba, Venezuela. The rite of coronation was executed on 12 March 1967 by the former Archbishop of Caracas, Cardinal José Humberto Quintero Parra.

== In film ==
In the fictionalized film Elizabeth (1998), Queen Mary I of England emotionally implores her cousin the Princess Elizabeth I the retention of the Catholic Church as the state religion after her death, mentioning the "Consolations of the Blessed Virgin, (their) Holy Mother" with a Marian statue of the image featured in the background.

== Gallery ==
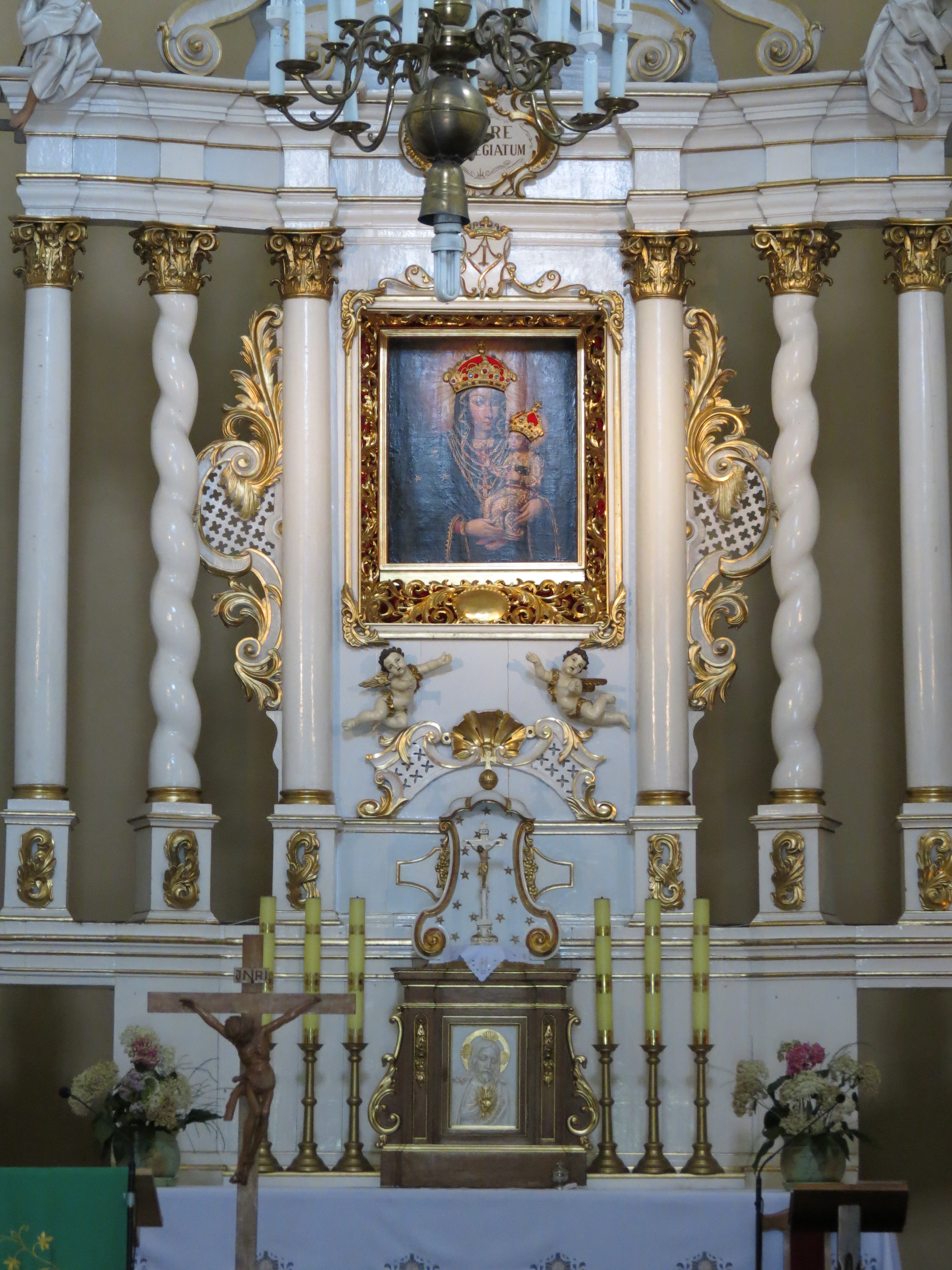
Image of Our Lady of Consolation above the High altar in Orchówek, Poland

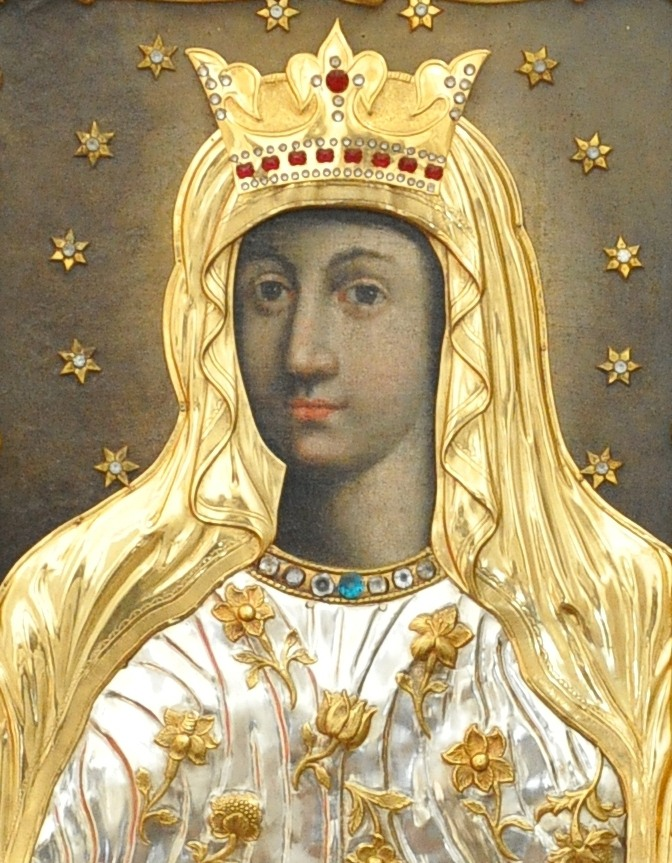
Our Lady of Consolation of the Afflicted in Miedzna, Poland

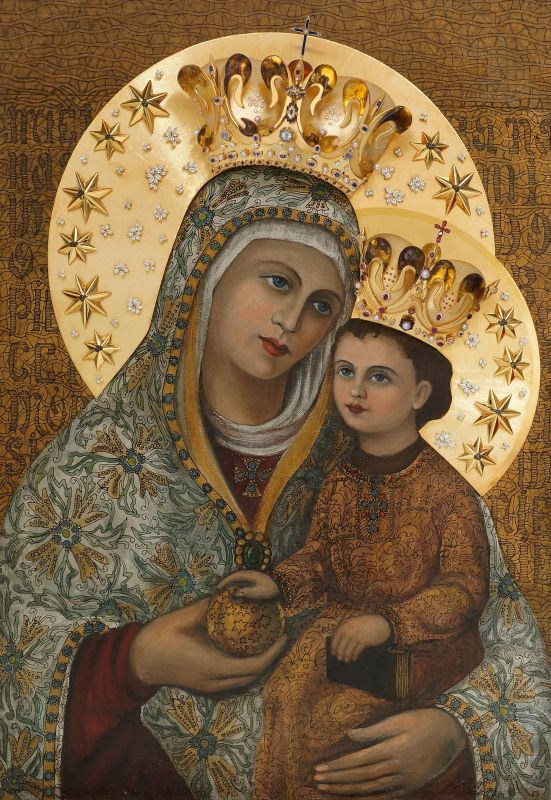
The crowned icon venerated in Gdynia, Poland

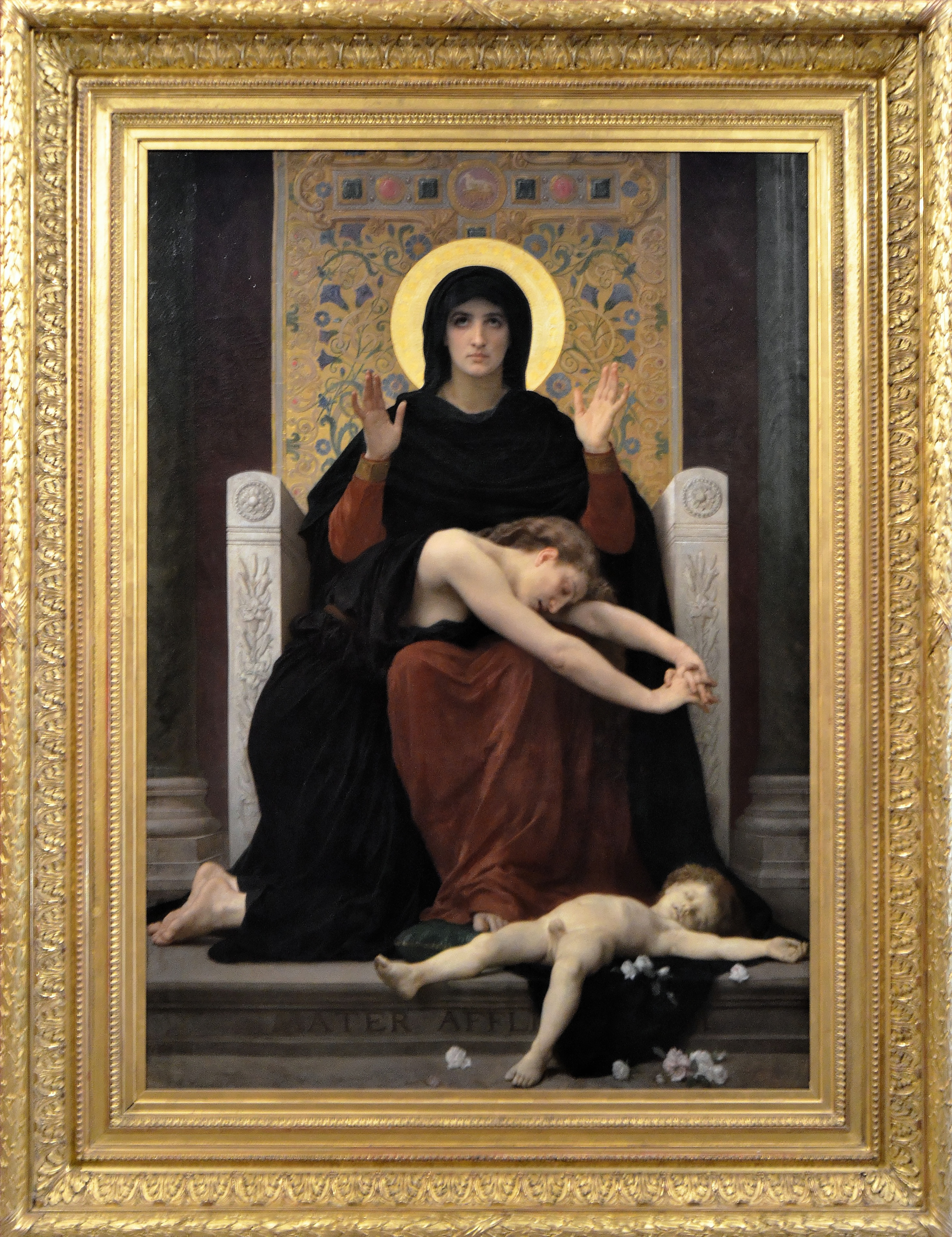
Mater Afflictorum (1875) by William Adolph Bouguereau (Alsace, France)

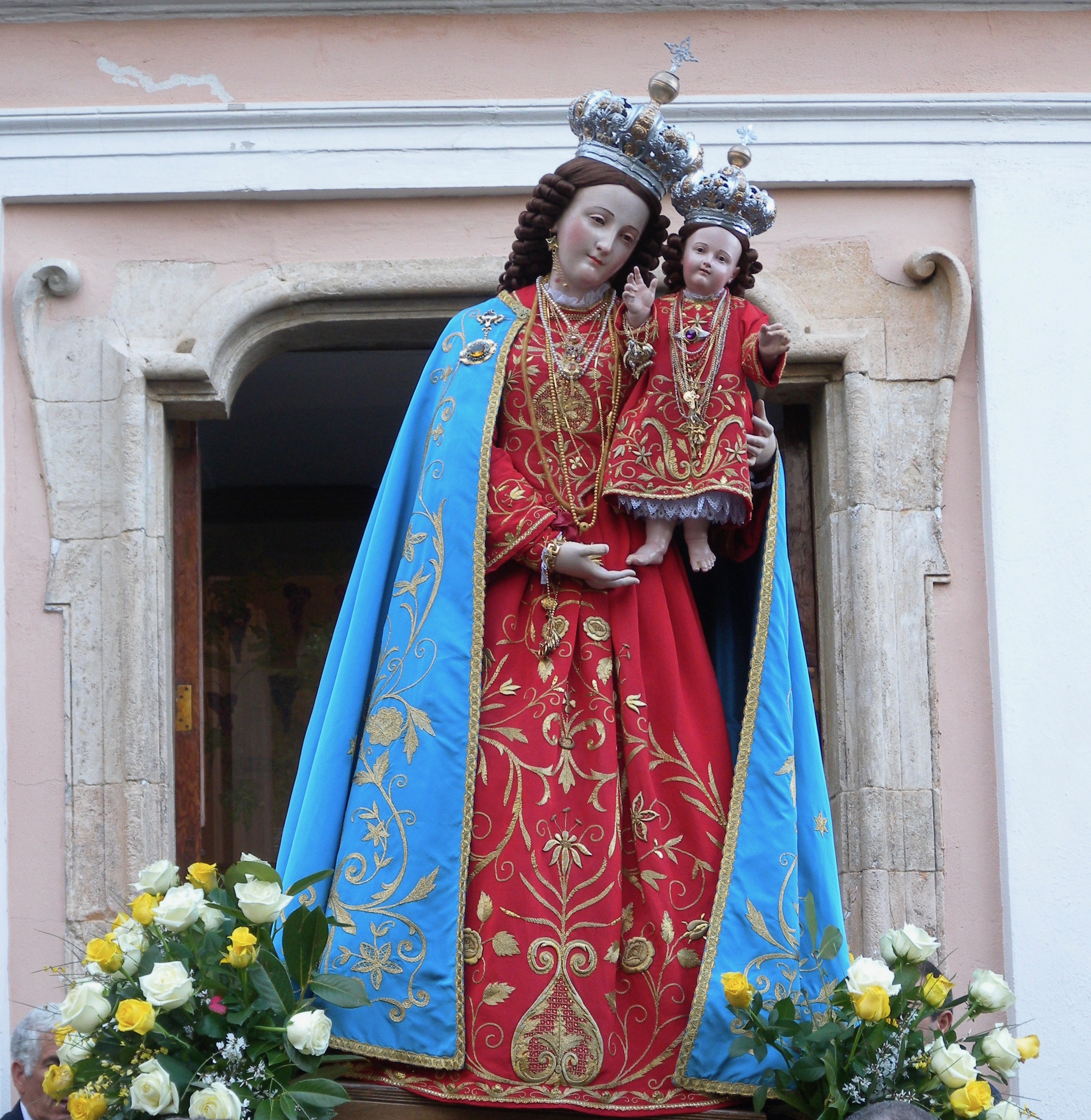
Our Lady of Consolation of Arcavacata (Cosenzia, Italy)

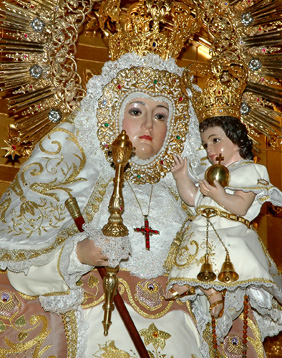
Image in Pozuelo de Alarcon, Spain

== See also ==
- Our Lady of Good Counsel
