= Catholic University of Tachira =

University in Venezuela

Coordinates: 7°47′23.47″N 72°13′37.09″W

- Calle Jose Gregorio Hernandez, San Cristóbal, Táchira, Venezuela

Information
- Type: Jesuit, Catholic
- Established: 1962; 64 years ago
- Rector: Javier Yonekura Shimizu
- Staff: 621 professors
- Enrollment: 4,272
- Website: Catholic University of Tachira
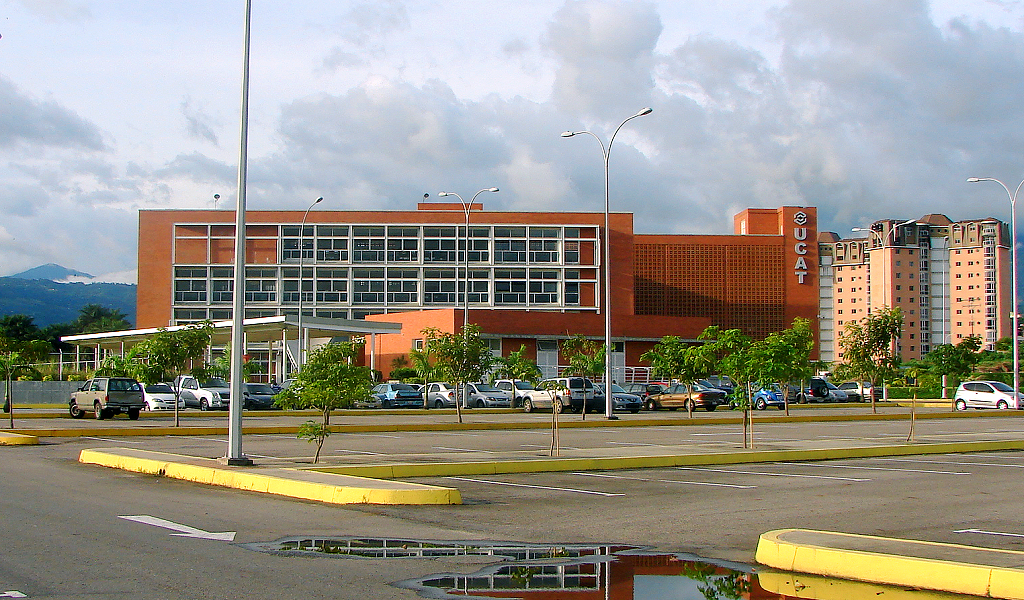
- Sabana Larga headquarters of UCAT

Catholic University of Tachira (Universidad Católica del Táchira – UCAT) in San Cristobal, capital of Táchira state in Venezuela, originated in 1962 as an extension of Andrés Bello Catholic University of the Society of Jesus.

== History ==
The Catholic University of Tachira is a tertiary education institution born through the initiative of the Diocese of San Cristobal. It received the support of the Andrés Bello Catholic University, which in 1962 decided to open an outreach campus in Tachira. Actual activities began on 22 September 1962. It was the first institution of higher education in Tachira state. At that time the NGO "Asociación Civil" was responsible for the financial and administrative management of the university. In 1982 the outreach campus became independent from Andres Bello University by decree of the President of the Republic.

In 2012 the university was canonically recognized by Pope Benedict XVI.

== Colleges and schools ==
The university offers 14 undergraduate and 24 graduate courses.

Legal and political sciences

- Law
- Degree in Political Science

- International policy
- Public administration and management

- T.S.U. in Criminal and Criminal Sciences

Humanities and education

- Biology and Integral Chemistry
- Social Sciences
- Computer Science and Mathematics

Economics and social sciences

- Public Accountant degree
- Degree in Administration

- Business management
- Human resources management
- Information management
- Marketing

== See also ==
- List of Jesuit sites
- Martín Marciales Moncada
