= Basilica and National Shrine of Our Lady of Consolation =

Roman Catholic Basilica in Carey, Ohio

Coordinates: 40°57′03″N 83°23′14″W

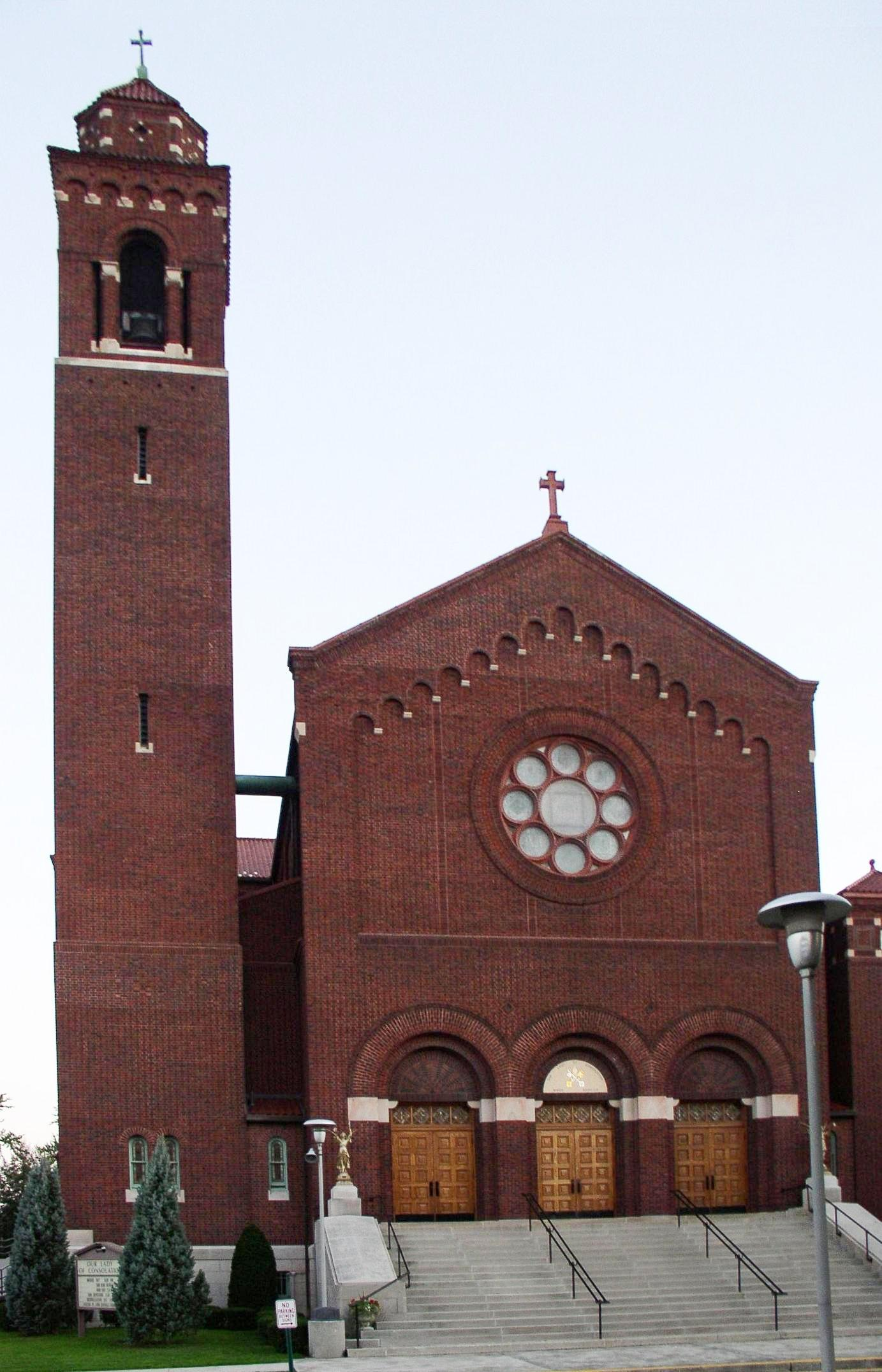
The frontal exterior of the Basilica.

The Basilica and National Shrine of Our Lady of Consolation is a Roman Catholic basilica located in Carey, Ohio in the United States of America and is dedicated to the Blessed Virgin Mary under the title of Our Lady of Consolation. The Marian shrine is administered by the Order of Saint Francis and is designated as National shrine by the Holy Office.

Pope Paul VI raised the Marian shrine to the status of Minor Basilica via his Pontifical decree Quam Prope Assit on 21 October 1971. The decree was signed and notarized by the Dean of the College of Cardinals and Grand Chancellor of the Apostolic Briefs, Cardinal Luigi Traglia.

== Significance ==
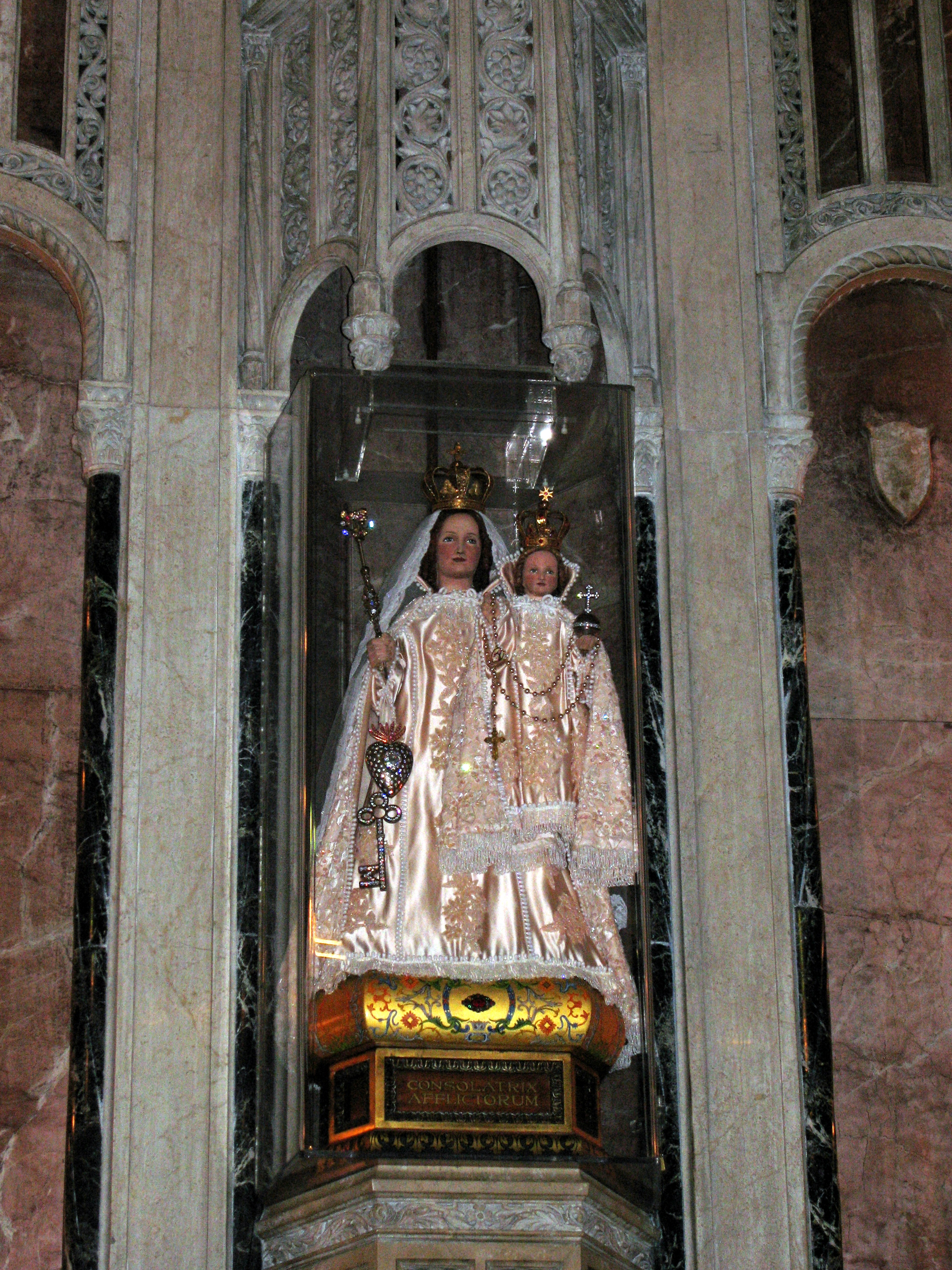
The venerated Marian statue of Our Lady of Consolation (1875) inside the basilica.

One of the seven Roman Catholic basilicas in Ohio, it is one of some 93 basilicas in the United States. It is the site of an annual pilgrimage of Roman Catholics (primarily from the Middle East) to mark the Feast of the Assumption of Mary, celebrated 15 August of every year. The basilica is designated as a shrine to Our Lady of Consolation.

== History ==
Devotion to Our Lady of Consolation spread to the United States, where the first shrine was built in Carey, Ohio. A statue was commissioned and arrived from Luxembourg in 1875, where a former devotion of Our Lady of Luxembourg was already well established.

The first Bishop of Toledo, Joseph Schrembs invited the Conventual Franciscans of the Immaculate Conception Province in Syracuse, New York to take charge of the shrine.

In 1923, Ku Klux Klan members held a counter demonstration to the annual procession of the eve of the Feast of the Assumption, but ended holding a gathering on the outskirts of town.

== Basilica and shrine complex ==
The shrine complex includes the basilica, the original 1875 wooden parish church, the parish school, a rectory housing the pastor and other Franciscan priests, a provincial house which houses Franciscan friars, a convent for resident and visiting nuns, a retreat center providing lodgings for lay and religious pilgrims, a gift shop, and a cafeteria.

=== Original church ===
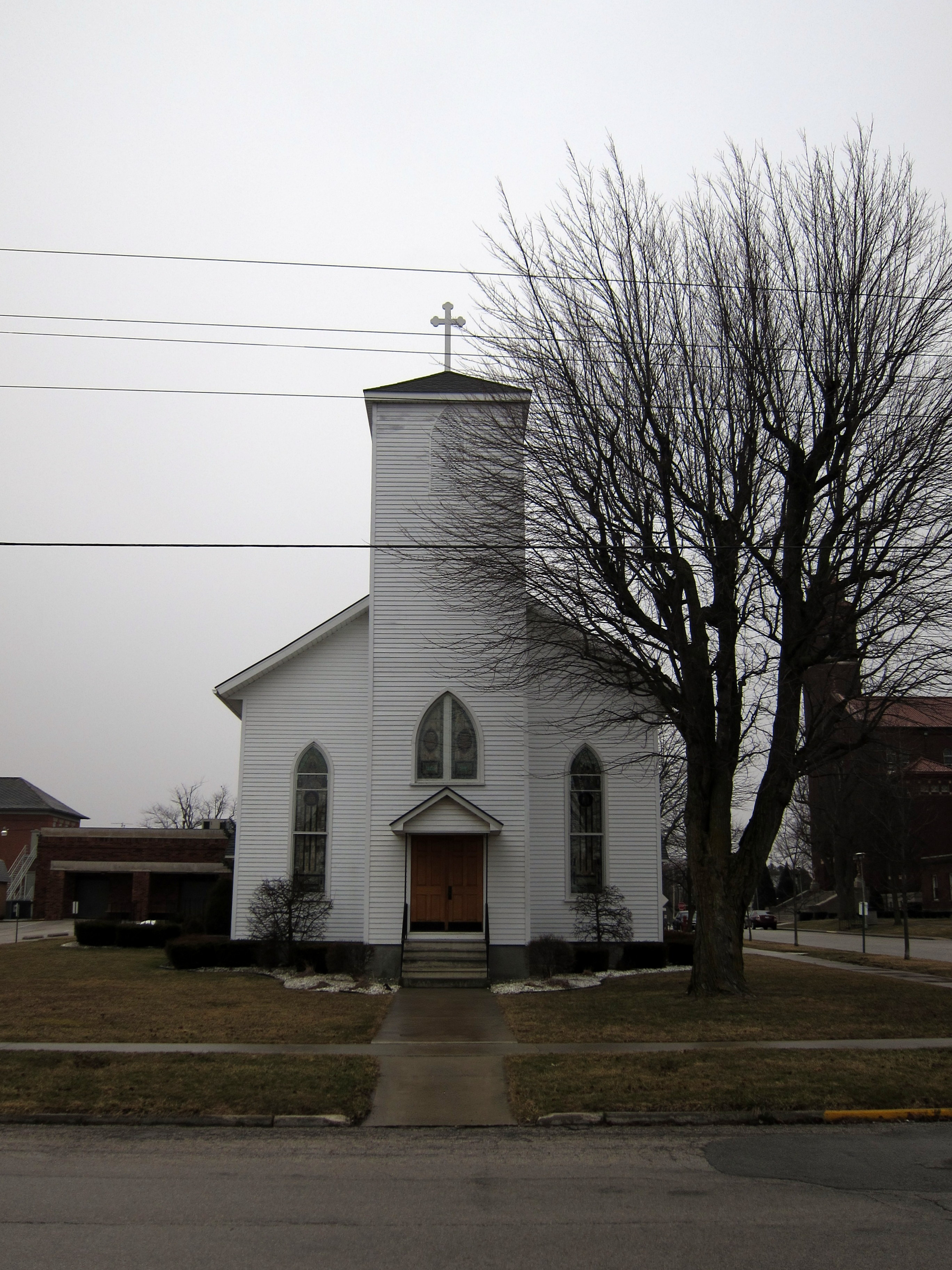
The original church in Carey, Saint Edward Church

The original parish church, the first church in Carey, began construction in 1868, under the direction of Father Edward Vatmann, pastor of St. Michael's in Findlay, Ohio. At its dedication, it was given the name of St. Edward. In 1873 Father Joseph Peter Gloden, pastor of the church of St. Nicholas, Frenchtown, came to serve the parish. The people of Carey worked to support the church's construction and prayed to Mary under the title of Our Lady of Consolation. The congregation renamed the church in her honor upon its completion.

Father Gloden, a native of Luxembourg, obtained a replica of the statue of Our Lady of Consolation venerated in the Cathedral of Luxembourg. The wooden statue, thirty-six inches high, depicted Mary holding the infant Christ with mother and child dressed in ornate garments. On May 24, 1875, the statue of Our Lady of Consolation was carried in procession to the church, from the church of St. Nicholas, in Frenchtown, some seven miles away. It is claimed that the first miraculous event occurred during this procession. As the procession marched, a severe storm raged in the entire area. Throughout the seven-mile walk, not a drop of rain touched the statue nor anyone in the procession.

The original parish church remains today and still sees daily use for early morning Mass, as well as for special programs and devotions.

=== Basilica ===
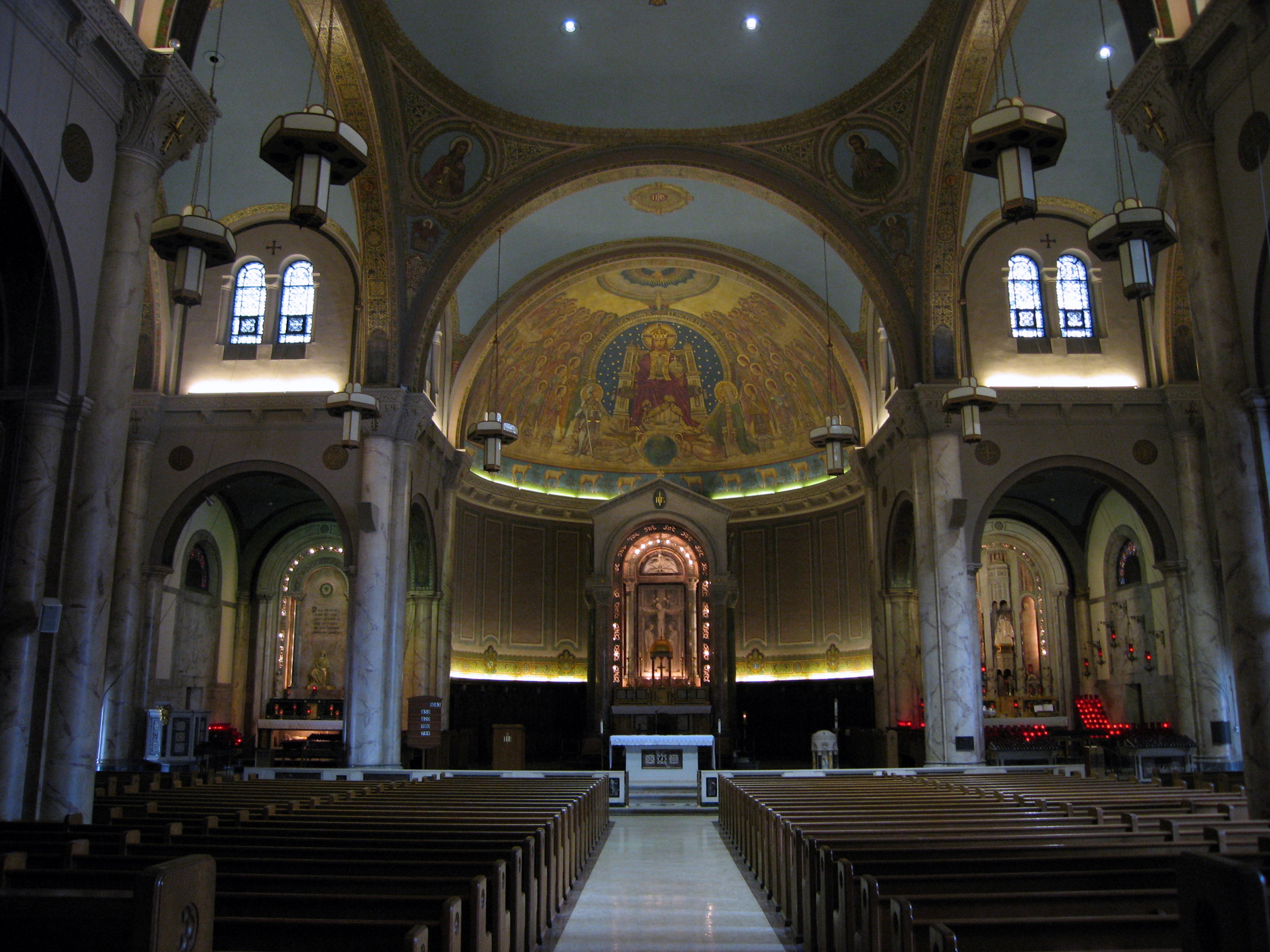
The basilica interior

The increasing number of pilgrims necessitated a bigger church. In 1924 construction of the red-brick Romanesque church was finished. The present Byzantine-style basilica is located at the corner of Clay & West streets. The main floor contains the narthex, the sanctuary, and the altar which maintains its pre-Vatican II configuration, separating the celebrant from the congregation by an altar rail and providing religious statuary and votive candles in alcoves along both sides of the sanctuary. A choir loft containing the basilica's pipe organ is located above the narthex overlooking the sanctuary. The statue of Our Lady of Consolation is at the right side altar; the opposite side altar is dedicated to Our Lady of Sorrows.

A second sanctuary is located in the basement, along with confessionals for the sacrament of reconciliation. Along the sides of the basement sanctuary, display cases show the various items cast off by those reportedly healed, including artificial limbs, canes, and crutches.

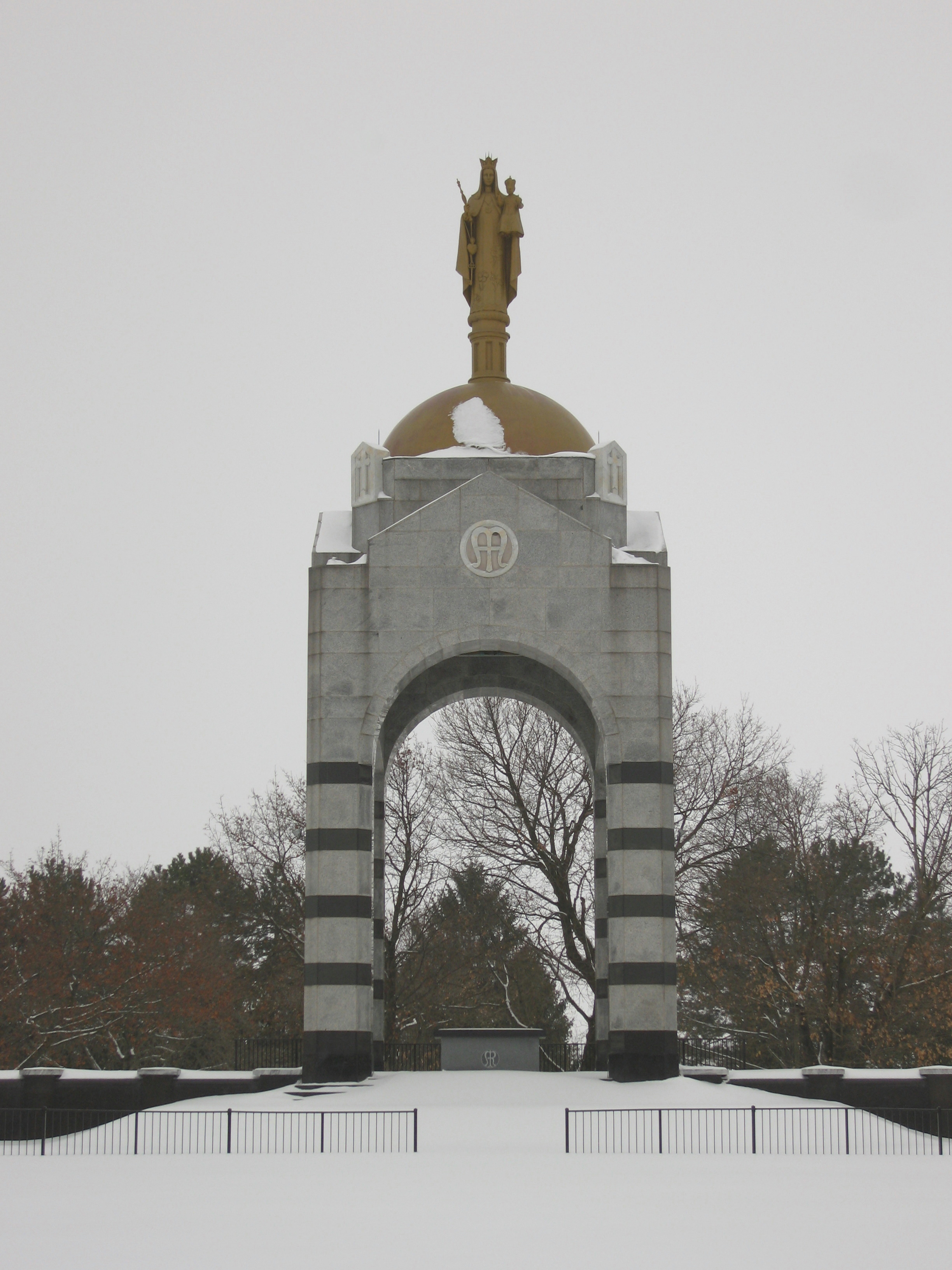
Altar in the Shrine Park

=== Shrine Park ===
The nearby Shrine Park is the site of a set of Stations of the Cross that stretches nearly a mile along the park's winding perimeter road, encircling an outdoor altar situated under a large dome supported by four marble columns. The dome is finished in gold and supports a statue at its apex of the Blessed Virgin Mary which can be seen from miles away. Shrine Park serves as the destination for the religious procession from the basilica on the Feast of the Assumption.

== Our Lady of Consolation ==
Starting in the second century, Catholics venerated Mary as Our Lady of Consolation, one of her earliest titles of honor. The title of Our Lady of Consolation, or Mary, Consoler of the Afflicted, comes from the Latin Consolatrix Afflictorum. It is found in the Litany of Loreto. Immigrants from Europe fostered the veneration of Our Lady of Consolation within the United States.

=== Feast day ===
The feast of Our Lady of Consolation is one of the solemnities not inscribed in the General Roman Calendar, but which are observed in particular places, regions, churches or religious institutes. Augustinians observe September 4; the Benedictines July 5.

== See also ==
- List of churches in the Roman Catholic Diocese of Toledo
