= Táriba =

- City
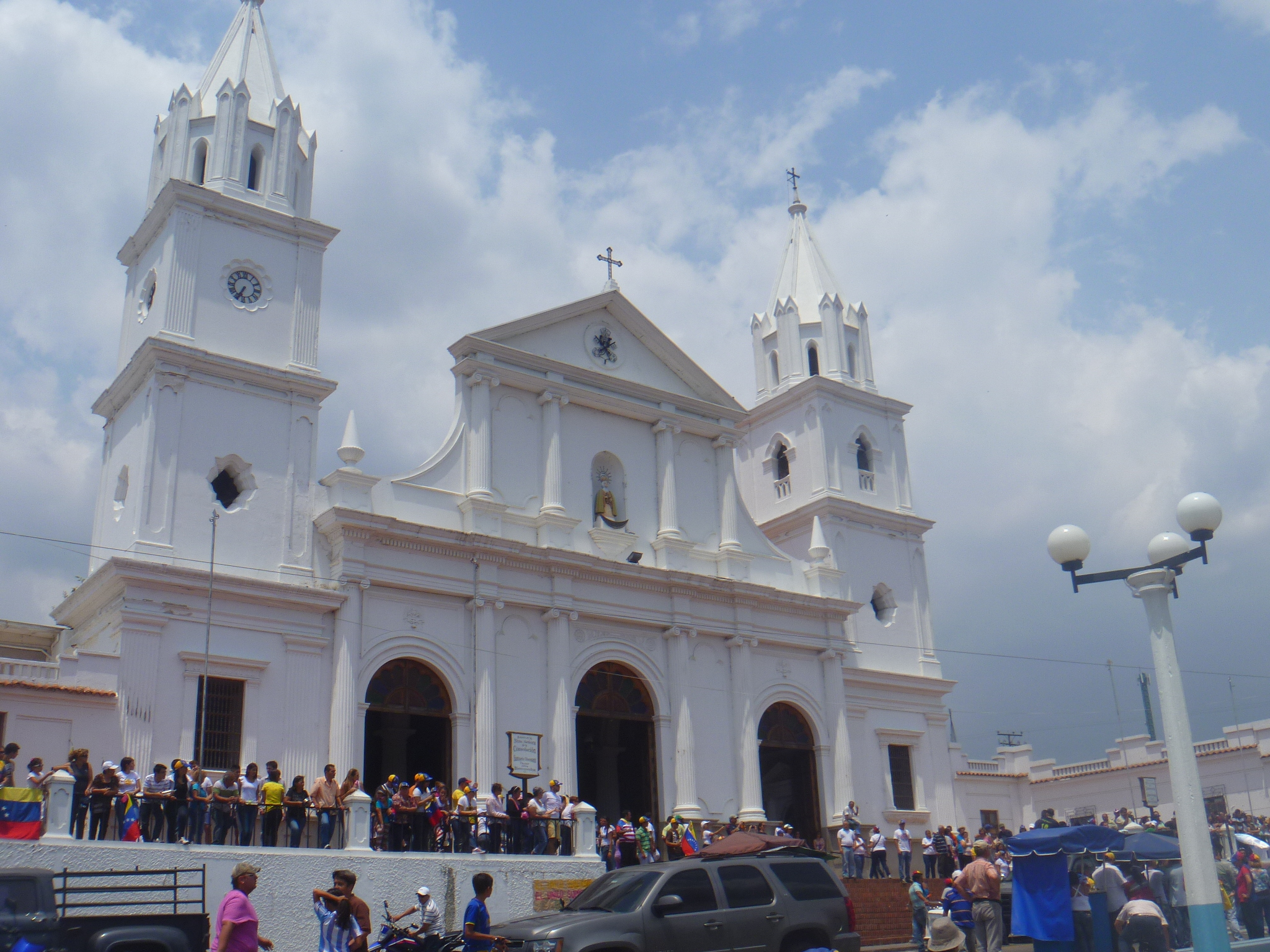
- Nuestra Señora de la Consolación Basilica.

- Flag Coat of arms

- Location within Venezuela
- Coordinates: 07°49′00″N 72°13′00″W
- Country: Venezuela
- State: Táchira
- Municipality: Cardenas
- Founded: 1547
- Elevation: 860 m (2,820 ft)

Population (2010)
  - Total: 128,590
- Demonym: Taribero
- Time zone: UTC−4 (VET)
- postal code: 5017
- area code: 0276
- Climate: Aw

Táriba is a town in Táchira, Venezuela, and is the capital of the Cárdenas Municipality. It was founded in 1602. Táriba has a population of 128,590. It's located on the outsides of the city of San Cristóbal. Like other Venezuelan cities, Táriba was founded by an ancient indigenous people and then discovered by Alonso Pérez de Tolosa in 1547.

Tariba has a very catholic culture, this can be shown in the Basílica de Nuestra Señora de la Consolación, like many other cities in Venezuela it has its own plaza bolivar.
