= Tornaco =

Tornaco may refer to:

- Tornaco, Piedmont, a commune in north-western Italy
- Tornaco Castle, a castle in southern Belgium
- De Tornaco family
- Charles Auguste de Tornaco (1763-1837), industrialist and politician
- Camille de Tornaco (1807 – 1880), Belgian politician
- Victor de Tornaco (1805 – 1875), Belgian-Luxembourgian politician and Prime Minister of Luxembourg
- Charles de Tornaco (1927 – 1953), Belgian motor racer
