= Tornaco Ministry =

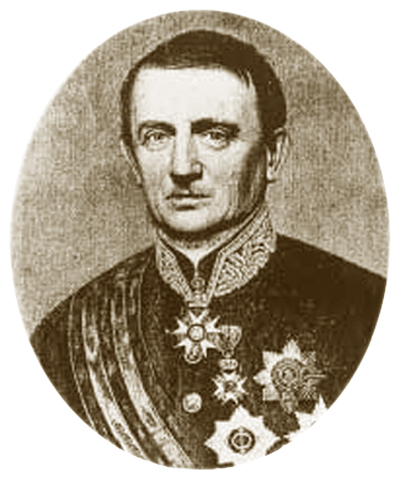
Victor de Tornaco, Prime Minister 1860-1867

The Tornaco Ministry was in office in Luxembourg from 26 September 1860 until 3 December 1867. It was reshuffled six times.

The government of Victor de Tornaco saw several important developments in international politics, such as the dissolution of the German Confederation in 1866 after the Austro-Prussian War, and an attempt by Napoleon III to purchase Luxembourg off William III of the Netherlands, which was prevented by Otto von Bismarck. A solution to this crisis was found in London, and made official in the Second Treaty of London: the Prussian garrison had to withdraw, the fortress of Luxembourg was demolished and Luxembourg was declared neutral and independent.

In the same period, railway lines were laid down from Wasserbillig to Trier and from Ettelbrück to Gouvy, which was a boost to the steel industry in Luxembourg.

== Transition ==
The election of 1857 was a boost to the opponents of the Simons government within the Assembly of Estates. It became more and more difficult for the ministers of the coup d'État of 1856 to continue governing, in the face of majority of the opposition. Charles-Mathias Simons tendered his resignation on 26 September 1860. The opposition Deputy and old ally of Norbert Metz, Baron Victor de Tornaco, was charged with forming a new government.

== Foreign policy ==
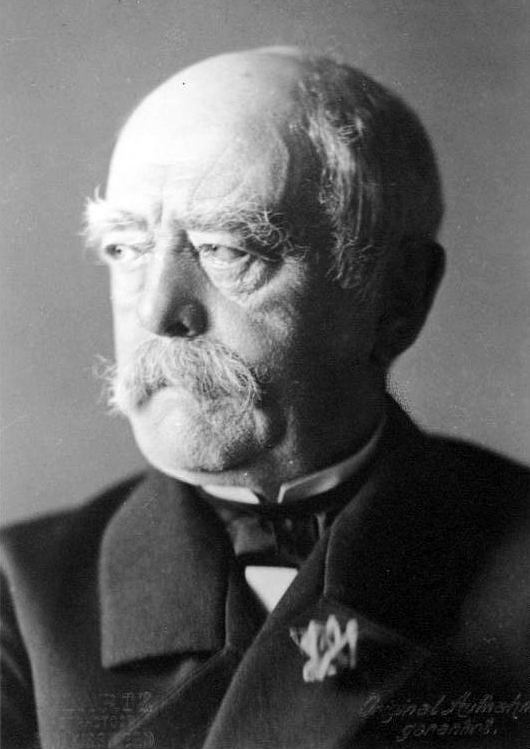
Otto von Bismarck, Prussian Prime Minister at the time of the Luxembourg Crisis

The Tornaco government faced a profound crisis from 1866 to 1867 which threatened Luxembourg's independence. The German Confederation was dissolved after the Austro-Prussian War of 1866. Although Luxembourg did not join the new North German Confederation formed by Prussia, the latter continued to maintain a garrison in the fortress of Luxembourg. At the same time, France now demanded a territorial compensation for having stayed neutral during the conflict. Napoleon III proposed to the King-Grand Duke to purchase the Grand Duchy for 5 million francs. William III accepted, but the Prussian chancellor Otto von Bismarck was staunchly opposed.

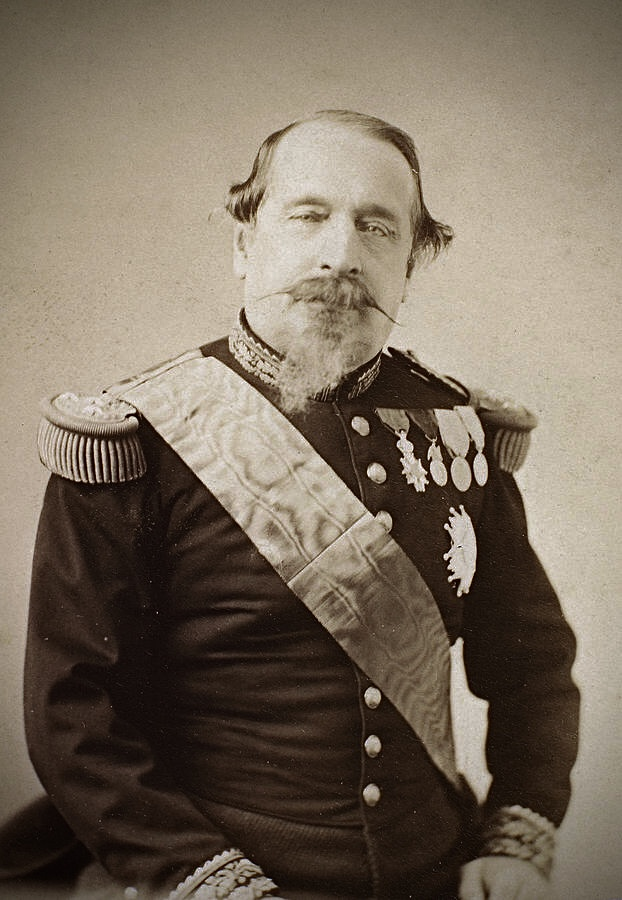
Napoleon III, French Emperor

To resolve this crisis in which Napoleon III risked losing face, the great powers came together in London. They finally agreed that Prussia would withdraw its garrison, the fortress would be demolished, and the Grand Duchy would become neutral in perpetuity. France would renounce its territorial claims. The Tornaco government had observed a strict neutrality during the Austro-Prussian war. During the negotiations in London, the Luxembourgish delegates had adopted a wait-and-see attitude, almost one of resignation. The government was mainly concerned with the costs of the impending demolition of the fortifications, whereas the city council of Luxembourg was anxious to guarantee the revenues of the city's businesses and shops, which would suffer from the departure of the garrison.

== Domestic policy ==
From the moment he became head of government, Tornaco engaged in a policy of reconciliation in domestic policy. He annulled a certain number of measures which had been passed after the constitutional revision of 1856. However, the world of Luxembourgish politics remained very much divided. In his autobiography, Emmanuel Servais described the political battles which preoccupied the Luxembourgish elite at the time: "It was not political questions, but personal animosities which inflamed people's passions. Electoral struggles were sometimes conducted with an extraordinary intensity, and led to huge expenses; the discussions in the Chamber were irritating even though they pertained only affairs of minor importance; the polemic of the newspapers was of an excessive insolence."

== Economic policy ==
Under the Tornaco government, railway construction continued apace. The year 1861 saw the inauguration of the railway line from Luxembourg over Wasserbillig to Trier, followed in 1862 by a line through the north of the country and Ettelbrück, extended in 1866 to Gouvy. The railway construction provided a boost to the Luxembourgish economy, and paved the way for the rise of modern steel production. In 1865, the Metz family's company established a new factory only using coke near Dommeldange railway station. The years of the Tornaco government also saw a liberalisation of international trade. Prussia concluded free-trade agreements with France (1862) and Belgium (1863), from which Luxembourg profited as a member of the Zollverein.

== Composition ==
=== 26 September 1860 to 9 September 1863 ===
- Victor de Tornaco: Minister of State, head of government, Director-General for Foreign Affairs and Public Works
- Jean Ulveling: Director-General for Finance
- Michel Jonas: Director-General for the Interior and for Justice

=== 9 September 1863 to 31 March 1864 ===
- Victor de Tornaco: Minister of State, head of government, Director-General for Foreign Affairs and¨Public Works
- Jean Ulveling: Director-General for Finance
- Bernard-Hubert Neuman: Director-General for the Interior and for Justice

=== 31 March 1864 to 26 January 1866 ===
- Victor de Tornaco: Minister of State, head of government, Director-General for Foreign Affairs
- Jean Ulveling: Director-General for Finance
- Ernest Simons: Director-General for the Interior and Public Works
- Henri Vannerus: Director-General for Justice

=== 26 January 1866 to 3 December 1866 ===
- Victor de Tornaco: Minister of State, head of government, Director-General for Foreign Affairs
- Jean Ulveling: Director-General for the Interior
- Ernest Simons: Director-General for Finance
- Henri Vannerus: Director-General for Justice

=== 3 to 14 December 1866 ===
- Victor de Tornaco: Minister of State, head of government, Director-General for Foreign Affairs
- Jean Ulveling: Director-General for the Interior
- Léon de la Fontaine: Director-General for Justice a Finance

=== 14 December 1866 to 18 June 1867 ===
- Victor de Tornaco: Minister of State, head of government, Director-General for Foreign Affairs
- Léon de la Fontaine: Director-General for Justice
- Jean Colnet d'Huart: Director-General for Finance
- Félix de Blochausen: Director-General for the Interior

=== 18 June 1867 to 3 December 1867 ===
- Victor de Tornaco: Minister of State, head of government, Director-General for Foreign Affairs
- Jean Colnet d'Huart: Director-General for Finance
- Félix de Blochausen: Director-General for the Interior
