= Constitution of Luxembourg =

Supreme law of the Grand Duchy of Luxembourg

The Constitution of the Principality of Luxembourg
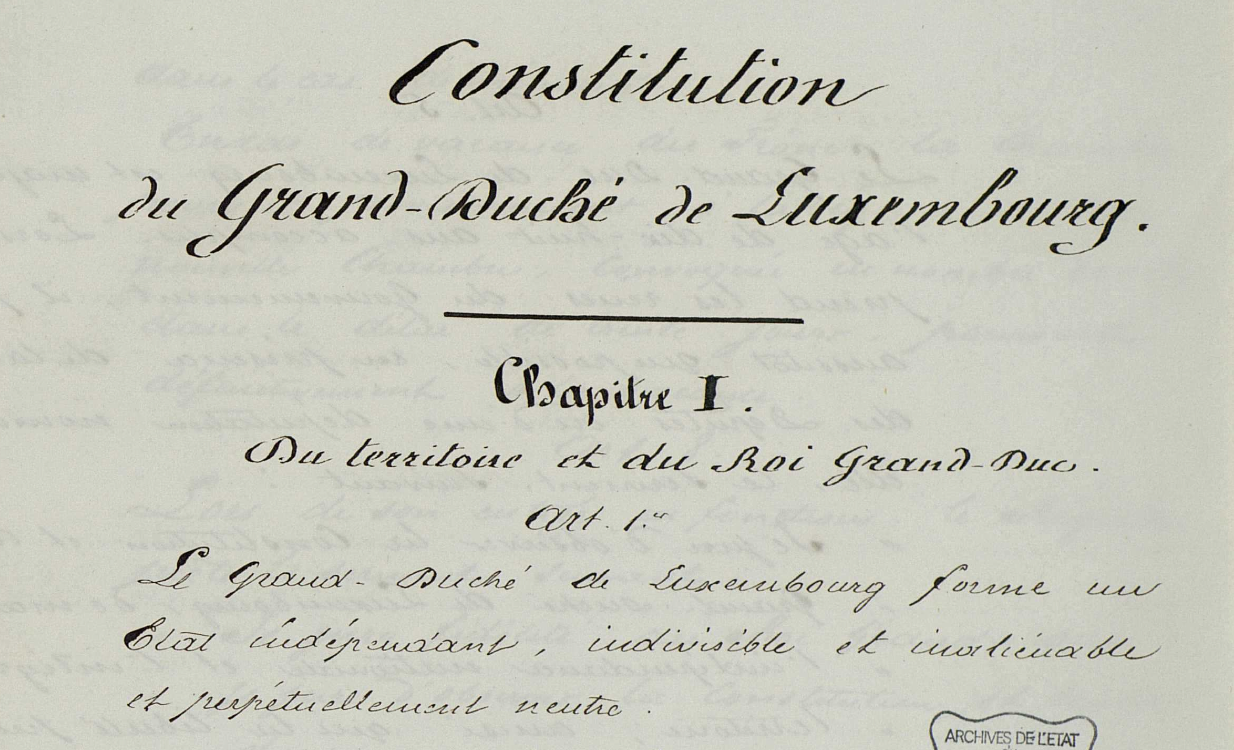

Overview
- Original title: Loi du 17 octobre 1868 portant révision de la Constitution du 27 novembre 1856
- Jurisdiction: Luxembourg
- Ratified: 17 October 1868; 158 years ago
- System: Parliamentary Monarchy

Government structure
- Branches: Three (executive, legislature and judiciary)
- Head of state: Grand Duke
- Chambers: Chamber of Deputies of Luxembourg
- Executive: Grand Duke and their Government; Prime minister as head of government
- Judiciary: Constitutional Court
- Federalism: No
- Electoral college: No
- First legislature: 17 December 1868
- First executive: Servais Ministry
- Last amended: 2020
- Citation: Mémorial A n° 23 de 1868
- Location: Archives nationales de Luxembourg
- Signatories: Gustave d'Olimart, Emmanuel Servais, Édouard Thilges, Henri Vannérus, Alexandre de Colnet-d'Huart, and William III of the Netherlands
- Supersedes: 1856 Constitution of Luxembourg
- Loi du 17 octobre 1868 portant révision de la Constitution du 27 novembre 1856 at French Wikisource

The Constitution of Luxembourg (Luxembourgish: Lëtzebuerger Constitutioun/Verfassung; French: Constitution du Grand-Duché de Luxembourg; German: Luxemburgische Verfassung) is the supreme law of the Grand Duchy of Luxembourg. The modern constitution was adopted on 17 October 1868.

Whilst the constitution of 1868 marked a radical change in Luxembourg's constitutional settlement, it was technically an amendment of the original constitution. That original constitution was promulgated on 12 October 1841, came into effect on 1 January 1842, and was acutely amended on 20 March 1848, and again on 27 November 1856.

Luxembourg first emerged as a legitimate principality in the 14th century. It lived under successive Burgundian, Spanish, French, Austrian sovereignty, until 1815 when the Congress of Vienna erected it into a grand duchy and assigned it to William I, King of the Netherlands. However, it was not annexed to the Kingdom of the Netherlands; instead, it formed a personal union within the German Confederation created by the Congress of Vienna.

When the 1866 Austro-Prussian War led to the dissolution of the German Confederation, the Treaty of London (11 May 1867), which was drawn up in the resolution of the Austro-Prussian War, established the independence of the German-speaking part of Luxembourg.

Through the political instability from 1815 to 1868, Luxembourg was governed by five different constitutional documents. The recognition of Luxembourg as an independent state in 1868 called for yet another revision of the fifth Constitution of 1856. William III agreed to grant a more liberal constitution which went on to constitute the modern 1868 Constitution which is in use today. The new Constitution confirmed the principle of constitutional monarchy and the international status of Luxembourg, declaring it to be an "independent, indivisible, inalienable and eternally neutral" state. Although it was first adopted on 17 October 1868, the Constitution has since been amended many times in order to adapt with the evolving times.

== Nature of the Constitution ==
In Luxembourg, the Constitution is considered the supreme legal rule of the state. The written constitution is considered to be "evolutionary" in nature, and has continued to develop concurrently to historical and political events in Luxembourg over the last 200 years, instead of serving as a normative force. Thus, the 1868 Constitution is a living constitution and has been amended many times since its inception, most recently in 2025. It comprised 132 Articles, divided into 12 chapters, dedicated to describing the role of the Grand Duke, the rights and liberties of citizens and the power separation in the State.

Under the present Constitution, the Grand Duchy is a democratic, free, independent and indivisible state headed by a constitutional monarch and governed by a system of parliamentary democracy. It specifically outlines the roles of the executive, legislative and judicial branches of Luxembourg's system of government, as well as the Conseil d'Etat, which is responsible for moderating parliamentary procedure with respect to the Constitution.

== Historical Belgian and Dutch influences ==
Although it has since been revised many times, Luxembourg's 1868 Constitution is one of Europe's oldest written constitutions remaining in force, with many of its provisions even dating back to the first Constitution of the country, granted by William II of the Netherlands in 1841. The 1841 Chartered Constitution therefore greatly resembled the Dutch Constitution, the Grondwet of 1815, vesting all powers within the grand duke and creating legislative, executive and judicial bodies with very limited powers. The authoritarian regime prescribed by the 1841 Charter was not well received in Luxembourg society, prompting William II to succumb to demands for a revised, more liberal Constitution in 1848.

For the 1848 Constitution, a majority of the new constitutional provisions were inspired by the Belgian Constitution of 1831. This is because a part of Luxembourg had been governed under the 1831 Belgian Constitution in the previous decade as a consequence of the Belgian Revolution. The influence of the Belgian Constitution is still evident in the present, revised 1868 Constitution of Luxembourg. For instance, Article 87 provides for a Superior Court of Justice in Luxembourg. This is inspired by Article 147 of the Belgian Constitution which provides for a Court of Cassation to oversee uniformity and the legality of justice for the whole of Belgium.

Therefore, given its historical connections to the Netherlands and Belgium, Luxembourg's constitutional tradition has been strongly influenced by the constitutional traditions of these countries.

== Institutional landscape ==
The present Constitution of Luxembourg attributes the separation of powers as follows: executive power is exercised by the Grand Duke and the Government while legislative power is conferred upon the unicameral parliament (Chamber of Deputies) and the joint action of Government and the Council of State. Judicial power is attributed to courts and tribunals which function independently.

=== Grand Duke ===
The Constitution establishes that the sovereign power resides in the Nation. According to Article 32, the Grand Duke, Guillaume Jean Joseph Marie (2025 – present), exercises this sovereign power, conforming to this Constitution and to the laws of the country. He has only those powers that the Constitution and laws expressly confer upon him. Both within and outside the borders of Luxembourg, the Grand Duke is meant to express the identity of the country. He symbolises its independence, the unity of the territory and the permanence of the state.

The Constitution places the Grand Duke in a unique position outside common law. Article 1 of the Constitution provides that the person of the Grand Duke is inviolable. In other words, he cannot be tried by any court and he cannot be asked to be held accountable for his actions at all, from a penal or political standpoint. The Grand Duke's inviolability and unaccountability ensure the stability of the monarchical institution and his impartiality with respect to the political world.

Through Article 34, he is also tasked with making the regulations and decisions necessary for the execution of the laws. Through a process of "enactment", the Grand Duke can make the law enforceable. The law is published in the Official Journal of the Grand Duchy of Luxembourg. Subsequent to his legislative powers, the Grand Duke's regulatory power consists in making the regulations and administrative orders required for the enforcement of laws and treaties. In some cases he may delegate this power to the members of his government.

Hence, while the Grand Duke directly participates in legislative power, he exercises executive power only through his government, who he appoints on the advice of the elected Prime Minister.

The Grand Duke was originally vested with considerable reserve powers. However, from 1890 onward, most monarchs have limited themselves to a mostly representative role, a convention which was codified by constitutional amendment in 1919.

=== Government ===
According to Article 51 of the Constitution places the Grand Duchy of Luxembourg under a governmental regime of parliamentary democracy. Hence, while Article 76 provides that the Grand Duke will regulate the organisation of the government, he is bound by the democratic principle in practice.

The Grand Duke thus has the power to appoint a formateur to charge with building a Government. The formateur usually becomes Prime Minister and introduces the members of the Government to the Grand Duke, who appoints and swears them in. Article 76 provides that the government must have at least three members, whom the Grand Duke has the power to appoint and dismiss (this power to dismiss has yet to be exercised in 2021). However, in practice, the ministers he appoints must have the confidence of the voting majority. Customarily, therefore, the Grand Duke only appoints a Prime Minister on the basis of the results of the election.

Article 78 of the Constitution provides that members of the Government ('ministers') are responsible. Essentially, for an act issued by the Grand Duke to come into force, it must be countersigned by a member of the government who assumes full responsibility for it (Article 45). They are responsible to the Chamber of Deputies of the State, which has the power to withdraw its confidence in the ministers, obliging them to resign.

=== Chamber of Deputies (Parliament) ===
Luxembourg's parliament, known as the Chambre des Députés (Chamber of Deputies) represents the country and primarily exercises legislative power. According to Chapter IV of the Constitution, the law of the land regulates the organization of the Chamber. The Chamber is composed of 60 Deputies, elected through a direct election conducted in the four circumscriptions of the country. Article 51 provides that the Deputies are elected on the basis of universal suffrage, on [a party] list ballot, following the rules of proportional representation, conforming to the principle of the smallest electoral quotient and following the rules to be determined by the law.

The Chamber meets each year in ordinary session at the time specified by its regulations. The sittings of the Chamber, which require majority presence, are public (Article 61) and every resolution is taken with the absolute majority of votes (Article 62). According to Article 66, the Chamber has the right to amend and divide the articles and amendments proposed.

The Chamber of Deputies also acts as a check back mechanism against the ministerial actions of the government. If the Chamber disapproves of the policy of one or several ministers or of the entire government, it has the power to express its disagreement, either via a negative vote on a specific agenda proposed by the government, or by rejecting a government bill presented by the ministers. In the worst case, when the Chamber of Deputies withdraws its confidence (motion of censure) in the ministers, the political responsibility of ministers obliges them to resign.

=== Council of State ===
The Council of State originates from the preliminary Constitution of 1856 – its organization and obligations are both regulated by the law. Article 83 of the Constitution establishes that the Council of State is called to give its opinion on the bills and proposals of law and amendments, which have been and are proposed, as well as on all other questions which have been referred to it by the Government or by the laws. The Conseil d'Etat acts as the primary advisory organ and the 'guardian of the Constitution' and exercising a moderating function within the parliamentary procedure similar to that of a second chamber.

Until 1996, the Council of State also acted as the administrative court, but this function was transferred to the newly established Administrative Tribunal and Administrative Court in order for matters to be heard by an independent court. The Constitution also provides that the Council of State will have a true right of suspensive veto for legislative matters.

=== Courts and Tribunals ===
Article 49 of the Constitution provides that justice is rendered in the name of the Grand Duke by the courts and the tribunals. The Constitution grants courts and tribunals independence of function. Luxembourg has two jurisdictions, including an ordinary judicial branch which deals with civil disputes, disputes of a penal nature and disputes regarding political rights, and an administrative branch which rules on disputes with the authorities (Articles 84, 85). By establishing two systems, the constituent assembly has tried to avoid the ordinary courts' trespassing on the territory of the executive and thus infringing the principle of the separation of powers.

The organization of the courts is governed by Article 86 which provides that "no court may be established except by virtue of a law" – hence, the creation of courts is an exclusive power of the legislature. Moreover, while justice is delivered on behalf of the Grand Duke, he has no means of interfering in the exercise of judicial power. Article 90 of the Constitution provides that the justices of the courts and tribunals are directly appointed by the Grand Duke. Their appointment is permanent as accorded by Article 91.

The law also provides for the organisation of the Superior Court of Justice, whose justices of the peace, judges of the tribunals of the districts and the councillors of the Superior Court are irremovable (Article 91). The Superior Court of Justice settles the disputes of attribution following the mode determined by the law (Article 95).

=== Constitutional Court ===
In 1997, an additional constitutional court with limited powers was established in Luxembourg. Article 95 of the Constitution establishes that the Constitutional Court decides, by means of opinion, on the constitutionality of laws passed by the Chamber of Deputies, with the exception of the laws concerning the approval of treaties, which falls under the jurisdiction of the Grand Duke. However, it does not have the power to invalidate legislative acts, which can only be submitted to it by ordinary courts through a preliminary ruling procedure.

It is composed of nine members who are selected from the judges of the ordinary and administrative courts and continue to serve within those roles as well. They therefore sit as "part time" constitutional judges and cannot be removed from office. According to Article 95 of the Constitution, the court is composed of the President of the Superior Court of Justice, the President of the Administrative Court, two councillors of the Court of Cassation and of five magistrates appointed by the Grand Duke, on the joint advice of the Superior Court of Justice and of the Administrative Court.

It is not possible to appeal a decision of the Constitutional Court. However, the impact of a decision taken by the Constitutional Court's is strictly limited to the case which gave rise to the preliminary question. The legislature has full discretion whether to take the decision forward and amend or annul a law the court has declared to be inconsistent with the Constitution. A large majority of cases heard by the court are related to the principle of equality enshrined in Article 10 of the 1868 Constitution (see employment of elderly persons case (2010)).

Most recently, on 22 January 2021, Luxembourg's Constitutional Court issued a decision on the value of the legal certainty principle in tax legislation (Decision No. 152). The legal certainty principle, which requires that laws be made public, be definite with enough clarity, not have retroactive effect, and protect legitimate interests and expectations, though recognised by the Luxembourg administrative courts, had never been considered in the Constitutional Court. The Court's decision found that the principles of legal certainty, legitimate expectations, and non-retroactivity are to be seen as fundamental principles inherent in Luxembourg law, thus reaffirming the constitutionality of the legal certainty principle.

== Rights and liberties ==
The Constitution of Luxembourg is known for having a relatively short and fragmented chapter on fundamental rights, with some widely recognised principles missing. Chapter II of the Constitution on public freedoms and fundamental rights provides that the State owes its citizens certain rights and liberties. These include a right to education, a right to medical and social assistance, a right against censorship and more. Importantly, pursuant to Article 10, Luxembourgers are equal before the law. Article 11 describes other important rights-based themes including affirmative action, employment rights, marriage and public life and political rights.

Notably, widely recognised principles such as a general prohibition of discrimination or a general requirement of fair trial are missing.

== Enactment of laws ==
A law may be initiated either by the Chamber of Deputies (Parliament) or the Government. The former is a known as a proposition de loi while the latter is known as a projet de loi. While a proposition de loi constitutes a Parliament bill, the latter are government bills. Government bills are submitted to the Parliament for adoption. A law may only be modified by another law. The Council of State may draw the government's attention to the opportunity for new laws or new regulations or modifications to be introduced into existing laws and regulations.

Until 2008, the Grand Duke had two legislative powers—the right of initiative, which permits him to authorise the government to submit bills to Parliament, and the right of assent, which, following the parliamentary adoption of a draft law, gives him the right to convert the draft into a real law. Without the latter, a draft could not become a law. However, the Parliament abolished the latter royal right to confirm laws in 2008 when the Grand Duke's position on euthanasia hindered the passing of a related law on the right to die with dignity. Essentially, the Luxembourg Parliament was to approve a parliamentary initiative that, under certain conditions, would authorize euthanasia and medically assisted suicide. The Grand Duke objected to such a law on moral grounds and, for the first time, refused to assent. The government believed that a decision of Parliament must be respected in all circumstances, so the disagreement between the Grand Duke and his ministers posed a constitutional question regarding who would prevail. Ultimately, with the agreement of the Prime Minister and all members of Parliament, the Constitution was amended to reflect the abolishment of the right of assent. According to Article 34, the Grand Duke must promulgate laws within a period of three months following the vote of Parliament. Additionally, in February 2008, the Luxembourg Chamber of Deputies adopted the Law on the Right to Die with Dignity.

In 2023, Luxembourg became the second country in the EU to legalise marijuana, after Malta.

== Constitutional amendments ==
=== Procedure ===
In terms of amending the Constitution, Article 114 provides that any revision of the Constitution must be decided upon by the Chamber of Deputies in two successive votes. The Chamber cannot proceed to a vote unless at least three-quarters of its members are present, and no amendment may be adopted unless it is backed by at least two-thirds of the votes.

The original procedure was quite rigid and comparable to the procedure of the Constitution of Belgium, where a Declaration of Revision of the Constitution needs to be adopted, automatically triggering a dissolution of parliament. The newly elected parliament then decides on the actual revision. This procedure was simplified in the Constitution of Luxembourg in 2003 to the current version.

=== 1919 Amendment ===
In the aftermath of World War I, a national referendum confirmed the will of the Luxembourg population to remain a constitutional monarchy. Hence, the Constitution was amended to consolidate the parliamentary democracy of the Grand Duchy. Secret treaties were abolished and all international treaties concluded by the grand duke had to be approved by law. Electoral laws were amended to reflect the principle of proportional representation. The Constitution also now explicitly stated that voters could express their views by referendum in cases and under conditions determined by law.

=== 1948 Amendment ===
The next official revision of the Constitution only occurred after the end of World War II. This time, the goal of the amendment was to bring the constitution up to date with the social and economic changes that had materialised in the country by that time. Rights and freedoms such as the right to work, the right to social security and the freedom to form and join trade unions were thus included in the revised Constitution, as was the protection of the family and the promotion of education (primary education was made compulsory and free of charge). Notably, these revisions to the Constitution cannot be of any legal significance until the legislature specifically implements measures that allow the courts to enforce them.

=== 1956 Amendment ===
The integration of Luxembourg into the European Coal and Steel Community, and its related treaties, posed a few new constitutional questions for Luxembourg since it required the Community to exercise powers that the Constitution had conferred upon Luxembourg's legislature, executive and judiciary. Thus, Article 49 was introduced to hold that the exercise of powers reserved to the legislature, executive and judiciary may temporarily be vested by treaty in institutions governed by international law.

=== Amendments since 1972 ===
There have been 26 Amendments to the Constitution since 1972 which reflect the evolving nature of the Luxembourg society. For instance, in 1972, the Chamber of Deputies reduced the minimum voting age to 18 years and the minimum age for election to 21 years (Article 52). In 1999, more than twenty years after the death penalty was abolished by law, an article was inserted into the Constitution providing that the death penalty cannot be reintroduced (Article 18). In March 2007, Article 11 was amended in order to strengthen several human rights and to introduce new constitutional objectives such as protection of the environment. Notably, however, a majority of the articles in the Constitution have never been amended and the contemporary edition still closely resembles the 1868 Constitution.

== Current status of the constitution ==
The frequency with which the 1868 Luxembourg Constitution has been amended historically is testament to its evolving nature as a "living" constitution, and is probably why it is still in use today.

However, the Parliamentary Committee on Institutions and Constitutional Revision, under the chairmanship of Paul-Henri Meyers, proposed a full revision of the 1868 Constitution on 21 April 2009, which, if passed, would effectively replace the 1868 Constitution in the Grand Duchy. This new constitution was expected to redefine the constitutional role of Grand Duke, as well as include reforms of justice, rights of children, animals, more direct democracy. It was also intended to update the antiquated language used in the text and reduce the frequency of ad hoc revisions of the laws through amendments.

The Constitutional Revision Committee completed its draft of a new constitution in June 2018. At the time, there seemed to be a large cross-party consensus on the major reform issues. However, the reform proposal stalled in 2018, when the majority party unexpectedly objected in the final phases. In 2020, four separate "new" constitutional reform proposals, which split and repackaged the failed one, resurfaced to be analyzed and debated again. On 20 October 2021, the Luxembourg Parliament finally proceeded with a preliminary vote on the first of the four proposals on the constitutional reform of the judiciary.

== List of amendments ==
- 15 May 1919 – National sovereignty was transferred from the monarch to the nation (French: La puissance souveraine réside dans la Nation) (Article 32). The monarch's powers to command the armed forces and to sign treaties were reaffirmed, provided that the treaty was not secret and that the Chamber of Deputies ratified it (Article 37). All changes to Luxembourg's territory were required to be ratified by law (Article 37).
- 28 April 1948 – The Grand Duchy was defined as a 'free, independent, and indivisible state' (French: un État libre, indépendant et indivisible), removing reference to, and therefore ending, its long-standing political neutrality (Article 1).
- 6 May 1948 – The regulation of language use in legal and judicial affairs became regulated by statute, rather than requiring the equal treatment of French and German (Article 29).
- 15 May 1948 – Suffrage was restricted to Luxembourgers living in Luxembourg, aged over 21 and in possession of their full political rights, whereas candidates were required to be 25 years old (Article 52).
- 21 May 1948 -
- 27 July 1956 -
- 25 October 1956 -
- 27 January 1972 -
- 13 June 1979 -
- 25 November 1983 -
- 20 December 1988 -
- 31 March 1989 -
- 20 April 1989 -
- 13 June 1989 -
- 16 June 1989 -
- 19 June 1989 -
- 23 December 1994 -
- 12 July 1996 -
- 12 January 1998 -
- 29 April 1999 -
- 2 June 1999 -
- 8 August 2000 -
- 18 February 2003 -
- 19 December 2003 -
- 26 May 2004 -
- 19 November 2004 -
- 21 June 2005 -
- 1 June 2006 -
- 13 July 2006 -
- 29 March 2007 -
- 24 October 2007 -
- 31 March 2008 -
- 23 October 2008 -
- 12 March 2009 – Sovereign only promulgates, not approves / authorises, laws
- 18 October 2016 -
