= Servais Ministry =

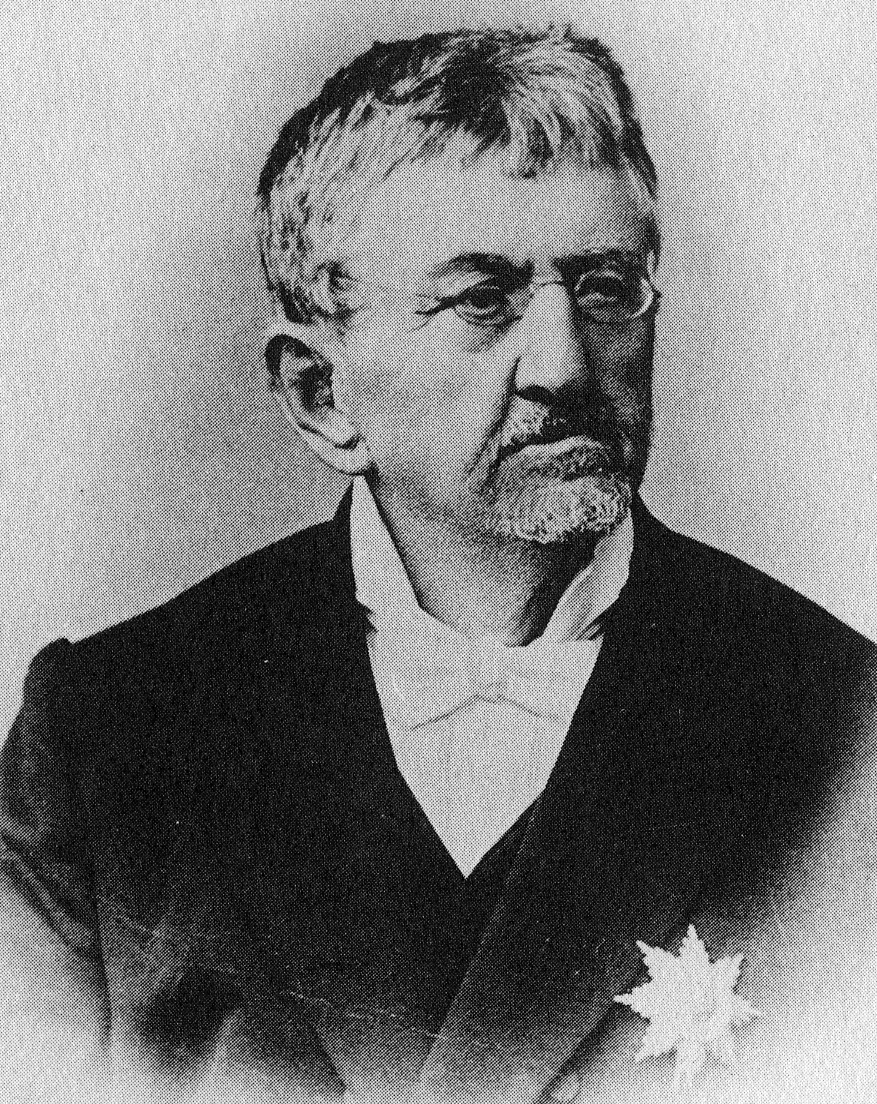
Emmanuel Servais, Prime Minister 1867-1874

The Servais Ministry was in office in Luxembourg from 3 December 1867 to 26 December 1874. It was reshuffled four times.

== Composition ==
=== 3 December 1867 to 30 September 1869 ===
- Emmanuel Servais: Minister of State, head of government, Director-General for Foreign Affairs
- Édouard Thilges: Director-General for Communal Affaires
- Henri Vannerus: Director-General for Justice
- Jean Colnet d'Huart: Director-General for Finance

=== 30 September 1869 to 12 October 1869 ===
- Emmanuel Servais: Minister of State, head of government, Director-General for Foreign Affairs, provisionally also for Finances
- Édouard Thilges: Director-General for Communal Affaires
- Henri Vannerus: Director-General for Justice

=== 12 October 1869 to 7 February 1870 ===
- Emmanuel Servais: Minister of State, head of government, Director-General for Foreign Affairs
- Édouard Thilges: Director-General for Communal Affaires
- Henri Vannerus: Director-General for Justice
- Georges Ulveling: Director-General for Finance

=== 7 February 1870 to 25 May 1873 ===
- Emmanuel Servais: Minister of State, head of government, Director-General for Foreign Affairs
- Henri Vannerus: Director-General for Justice
- Georges Ulveling: Director-General for Finance
- Nicolas Salentiny: Director-General for the Interior

=== 25 May 1873 to 26 December 1874 ===
- Emmanuel Servais: Minister of State, head of government, Director-General for Foreign Affairs
- Henri Vannerus: Director-General for Justice
- Nicolas Salentiny: Director-General for the Interior
- Victor de Roebe: Director-General for Finance

== Transition ==
The Grand-Duchy's independence was reinforced by the grave Luxembourg Crisis of 1867, and the resulting Treaty of London. However, public opinion was critical of the Tornaco government, blaming it for a too-cautious attitude while the country's fate was at stake at the London negotiations. On occasion, De Tornaco had given the impression of being resigned to ceding Luxembourg to France. His government fell after the Treaty of London. The neutrality demanded by this treaty made it necessary to reduce the size of Luxembourg's armed forces. Until then, the statutes of the Germanic Confederation obliged the Grand-Duchy to maintain a federal contingent stationed in Diekirch and Echternach; this became obsolete in 1867. When De Tornaco presented a law to reorganise the military to the Chamber of Deputies, it rejected it, forcing the prime minister to resign. The members of the resigning government suggested Emmanuel Servais as successor, who had distinguished himself during the negotiations in London.

== Foreign policy ==
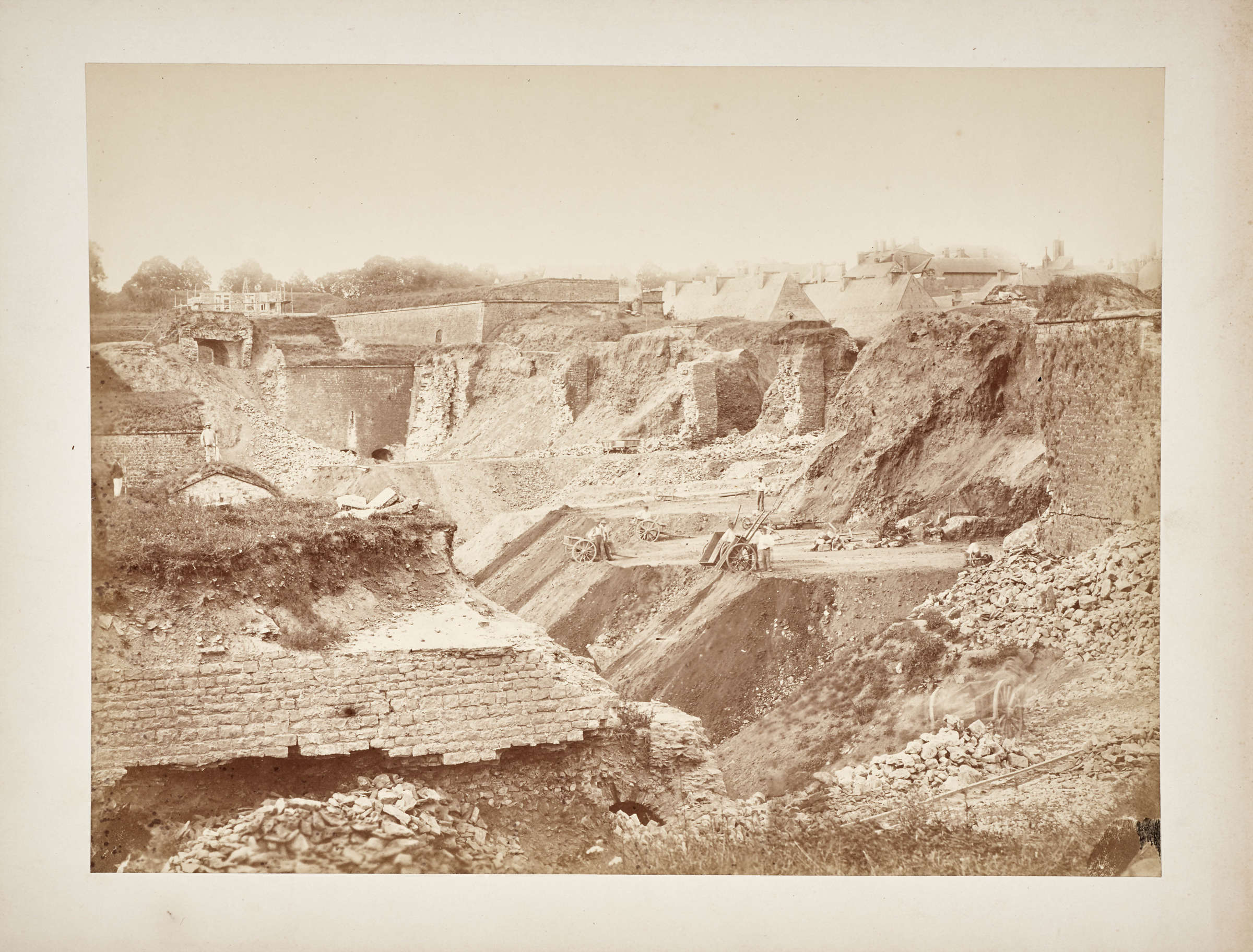
Demolition works on the Fortress of Luxembourg (Front of the Plain), 1869

=== 1867 Treaty of London ===
The Treaty of London of 1867 required Luxembourg to demolish its fortress, and declared it a neutral state. This was a solution to the Luxembourg Crisis, which had almost led to war between France and Prussia.

The Servais government had to carry out the stipulations of the treaty, and bear its costs. Demolishing the fortifications took until 1883, and cost 1,798,000 francs. The sale of the land to private individuals only covered part of the costs, and this was a massive drain on the state's budget. A government commission planned the expansion of the city now that it was no longer constrained by the fortress, with new avenues and boulevards and a green belt of parks.

The law of 1868 created a Luxembourgish corps des chasseurs, to maintain security and order. It was composed of 19 officers and 587 non-commissioned officers and men.

=== 1870 Franco-Prussian War ===
Compliance with the Treaty obligations did not shelter Luxembourg from another international crisis. In 1870, the Franco-Prussian War broke out, and several incidents threatened the country's neutrality. The population was openly on the side of the French, and the employees of the Compagnie de l'Est supplied the Thionville garrison via a train departing from Luxembourg. Though this was not approved by the government, Prussian chancellor Otto von Bismarck let it be known that the Prussian military would no longer feel bound by the Grand Duchy's neutral status. Another foreign occupation seemed imminent, and Servais drafted a memo vigorously refuting the Prussian allegations, which was sent not only to Berlin but all the governments that were signatories of the Treaty of London.

==== German railway takeover ====
In the end, after the French defeat, the newly created German Empire contented itself with control of the Luxembourgish railways. Via a clause in the Treaty of Frankfurt of 10 May 1871, the French Compagnie des chemins de fer de l’Est was forced to cede control of the Luxembourg railway network to the Germans. The Luxembourgish government had not been asked, and was opposed to this. It attempted to prevent this transfer, which was seen as damaging to its sovereignty, but this was in vain. Germany used the Zollverein (due to expire in 1875), as a means to exert pressure. The Luxembourgish government ended up signing a railway agreement on 11 June 1872. This put the Société Guillaume-Luxembourg under the control of the German Imperial Railways in Alsace-Lorraine until 1912. The two countries also agreed to not leave the Zollverein before this year. Germany committed itself to not using the Luxembourgish rail network for military transportation, and to respect its neutral status. In his speech to the Chamber of Deputies, Servais justified the concessions with the advantages of the agreement: it removed the danger which had been hanging over Luxembourg's independence for two years, and guaranteed stable economic relations for the future.

== Domestic policy ==
=== Constitution ===
The dissolution of the German Confederation after the Austro-Prussian War of 1866 allowed the Servais government in Luxembourg to turn its back on the German political model that had been imposed by the coup d'état of 1856, and to undertake a revision of the constitution. The resulting constitution of 1868 was a compromise between the republican text of 1848, and the monarchist charter of 1856. Ministerial responsibility and the annual vote on taxes were re-introduced. The Constitution guaranteed basic civil liberties such as freedom of the press and freedom of association again. At the same time, the sovereign retained several important prerogatives. After 1848, the government and the legislature had often locked horns over constitutional questions: the constitution of 1868 re-established a certain equilibrium between these two institutions.

=== Church ===
Since the Grand-Duchy of Luxembourg had been made an Apostolic Vicariate in 1840, there had been a growing need to redefine the relations between church and state. The civil authorities felt snubbed when in 1870 the Vatican took the initiative of creating a diocese and appointing Nicolas Adames as the first Bishop of Luxembourg. On the advice of the Council of State, the government at first refused to recognise the Vatican's decision. In 1872, it finally submitted a bill to legally establish the bishopric. The law, approved on 30 April 1873, stipulated that the bishopric could only be occupied by a Luxembourger, and the bishop had to swear an oath of loyalty to the monarch.

== Economic policy ==
=== Steel ===
The Servais government's time in office saw the beginnings of the modern steel industry in Luxembourg. The two last blast furnaces using charcoal, relicts of the pre-industrial era, were shut in 1868. New furnaces were established in Dommeldange and the mining area. The production of cast iron doubled in 4 years, rising from 93,000 tons in 1868 to 185,000 in 1872. Extraction of iron increased from 722,000 tons to 1 million tons in 1871. However, only a third of the iron ore that was mined was processed in the country, the rest being exported to Germany and Belgium. The Servais government's policy aimed to reverse this, and to divert resources towards the industrialisation of the country.

=== Mining ===
The mining law of 15 March 1870 declared all mineral deposits to a certain depth underground to be property of the state, and therefore subject to mining concessions. Another law in 1874 regulated the manner of these concessions, which were to become a major source of revenue for public finances. The price of concessions was to be paid in annuities staggered over many years, which allowed small Luxembourgish businesses with a small amount of capital to acquire concessions. The government had also intended to introduce a clause requiring the extracted iron ore to be processed in the country (the Verhüttungsklausel). However, this measure was strongly opposed by Germany, as it was contrary to the principles of the Zollverein, and in the end it was dropped. Nevertheless, through the laws of 1870 and 1874, the government had given itself a powerful instrument to steer the industrialisation of the country.

=== Railways ===
The government proceeded similarly in its railway policy. In 1866, the main lines towards each compass point had been finished, around 170 km. The government wanted to complete these routes with a beltline network which would reach not only the industrial region in the south, but also the rural cantons of the centre and the east. However, this network, offering poor profit margins, made private funders hesitate. The government therefore offered mining concessions as a form of subsidies to encourage the construction of secondary rail lines. The Société Prince-Henri, founded in 1868, ended up receiving the contract. The concession was contested by the Société Guillaume-Luxembourg which intended to construct the most profitable line, running from Esch-sur-Alzette to Rodange. The government took legal action against the Société Guillaume-Luxembourg, and won. This provoked passionate reactions in public opinion. Fragmentation would have threatened the completion of the beltline network, which was intended to put an end to the isolation of the localities in the Attert and Sûre valleys. The government's victory prompted veritable public celebrations in the affected regions. Later, the Société Prince-Henri experienced many financial struggles. When Emmanuel Servais resigned in 1874, only 89 km out of the intended 230 km were finished.
