= List of ministers for finances of Luxembourg =

The minister for finances (Luxembourgish: Finanzminister; French: ministre des finances; German: Finanzminister) is a position in the Government Council of the Grand Duchy of Luxembourg. Among other competences, the minister for finances is responsible for overseeing the public finances, including the budget.

The position of Minister for Finances has been in continuous existence since the promulgation of Luxembourg's first constitution, in 1848.

Since 24 March 1936, the title of Minister for Finances has been an official one, although the position had been unofficially known by that name since its creation. From the position's creation until 28 November 1857, the Minister went by the title of Administrator-General. From 1857 until 1936, the Minister went by the title of Director-General.

== List of ministers for finances ==
Minister	Party	Start date	End date	Prime Minister
Jean Ulveling (first time)	None	1 August 1848	2 December 1848	G T I de la Fontaine
Norbert Metz	None	2 December 1848	23 September 1853	Jean-Jacques Willmar
Emmanuel Servais (first time)	None	23 September 1853	29 November 1857	Charles-Mathias Simons
Guillaume-Mathias Augustin	None	29 November 1857	23 June 1859	Charles-Mathias Simons
Jean Ulveling (second time)	None	23 June 1859	26 September 1860	Charles-Mathias Simons
Jean Ulveling (second time)	None	26 September 1860	26 January 1866	Baron de Tornaco
Ernest Simons	None	26 January 1866	3 December 1866	Baron de Tornaco
Léon de la Fontaine	None	3 December 1866	14 December 1866	Baron de Tornaco
Alexandre de Colnet d'Huart	None	14 December 1866	3 December 1867	Baron de Tornaco
Alexandre de Colnet d'Huart	None	3 December 1867	30 September 1869	Emmanuel Servais
Emmanuel Servais (second time)	None	30 September 1869	12 October 1869	Emmanuel Servais
Georges Ulveling	None	12 October 1869	25 May 1873	Emmanuel Servais
Victor de Roebé	None	25 May 1873	26 December 1874	Emmanuel Servais
Victor de Roebé	None	26 December 1874	21 September 1882	Baron de Blochausen
Baron de Blochausen	None	21 September 1882	12 October 1882	Baron de Blochausen
Mathias Mongenast	None	12 October 1882	20 February 1885	Baron de Blochausen
Mathias Mongenast	None	20 February 1885	22 September 1888	Édouard Thilges
Mathias Mongenast	None	22 September 1888	12 October 1915	Paul Eyschen
Mathias Mongenast	None	12 October 1915	6 November 1915	Mathias Mongenast
Edmond Reiffers	None	6 November 1915	24 February 1916	Hubert Loutsch
Léon Kauffman	None	24 February 1916	19 June 1917	Victor Thorn
Léon Kauffman	None	19 June 1917	28 September 1918	Léon Kauffman
Alphonse Neyens	PD	28 September 1918	20 March 1925	Émile Reuter
Étienne Schmit	PRS	20 March 1925	16 July 1926	Pierre Prüm
Pierre Dupong	PD	16 July 1926	5 November 1937	Joseph Bech
Pierre Dupong	PD	5 November 1937	23 November 1944	Pierre Dupong
Pierre Dupong	CSV	23 November 1944	23 December 1953	Pierre Dupong
Pierre Werner	CSV	23 December 1953	29 March 1958	Joseph Bech
Pierre Werner	CSV	29 March 1958	2 March 1959	Pierre Frieden
Pierre Werner	CSV	2 March 1959	15 June 1974	Pierre Werner
Raymond Vouel	LSAP	15 June 1974	21 July 1976	Gaston Thorn
Jacques Poos	LSAP	21 July 1976	16 July 1979	Gaston Thorn
Jacques Santer	CSV	16 July 1979	20 July 1984	Pierre Werner
Jacques Santer	CSV	20 July 1984	14 July 1989	Jacques Santer
Jean-Claude Juncker	CSV	14 July 1989	26 January 1995	Jacques Santer
Jean-Claude Juncker	CSV	26 January 1995	23 July 2009	Jean-Claude Juncker
Luc Frieden	CSV	23 July 2009	4 December 2013	Jean-Claude Juncker
Pierre Gramegna	DP	4 December 2013	5 January 2022	Xavier Bettel
Yuriko Backes	DP	5 January 2022	17 November 2023	Xavier Bettel
Gilles Roth	CSV	17 November 2023	Incumbent	Luc Frieden
