= Sanem (disambiguation) =

Sanem may refer to:

== Places ==
- Sanem, commune and town in south-western Luxembourg
- Sanem Castle in the Luxembourg town
- Bascharage-Sanem railway station, railway station serving the towns of Bascharage and Sanem, in south-western Luxembourg
- Gmina Radomyśl nad Sanem, rural gmina (administrative district) in Stalowa Wola County, Subcarpathian Voivodeship, in south-eastern Poland
- Gmina Rudnik nad Sanem, urban-rural gmina (administrative district) in Nisko County, Subcarpathian Voivodeship, in south-eastern Poland
- Rudnik nad Sanem, town in Nisko County, Subcarpathian Voivodeship, Poland

== Given name ==
- Sanem Çelik, (born 1975), Turkish actress and ballerina
