= Thilges Ministry =

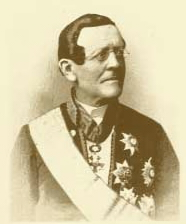
Edouard Thilges, Prime Minister from 20 February 1885 to 22 September 1888

The Thilges Ministry formed the government of Luxembourg from 20 February 1885 to 22 September 1888.

== Composition ==
- Édouard Thilges: President of the Government, Minister of State, Director-General for Foreign Affairs
- Paul Eyschen: Director-General for Justice
- Henri Kirpach: Director-General for the Interior
- Mathias Mongenast: Director-General for Finance

== Transition ==
Speculations on the stock market, which appeared like insider trading, brought about the fall of the Blochausen government. After the press revealed the suspicious transactions, the King-Grand Duke asked his Prime Minister to resign. He charged Emmanuel Servais with forming a new government. The latter suggested instead Édouard Thilges who, after some hesitation, took over a government that was devoted to continuity.

== Policy ==
With the exception of the bankruptcy of the Banque Fehlen & Cie in 1886, which had not recovered from the losses from the fall of the Banque nationale, the period of 1885-1889 went over without conflicts. The public finances under Mathias Mongenast were improved. The development of the Zollverein and the boom of the steel industry assured ever-growing revenues for the State. Important resources were invested in the expansion of the network of local railways. As an authentic liberal, Édouard Thilges advocated the non-intervention of the state in the functioning of the economy, even when some sectors ran into difficulties: "The government must lend support to all measures which may encourage the development of industry and trade in a general manner; but it must not intervene in favour of particular businesses […]. If we did something for one establishment ruined through their own fault, what would be our position towards other establishments, towards individuals who due to unexpected events find themselves in a difficult situation?"
