= Guarantee (international law) =

Agreement by a state to help another state fulfill its obligations

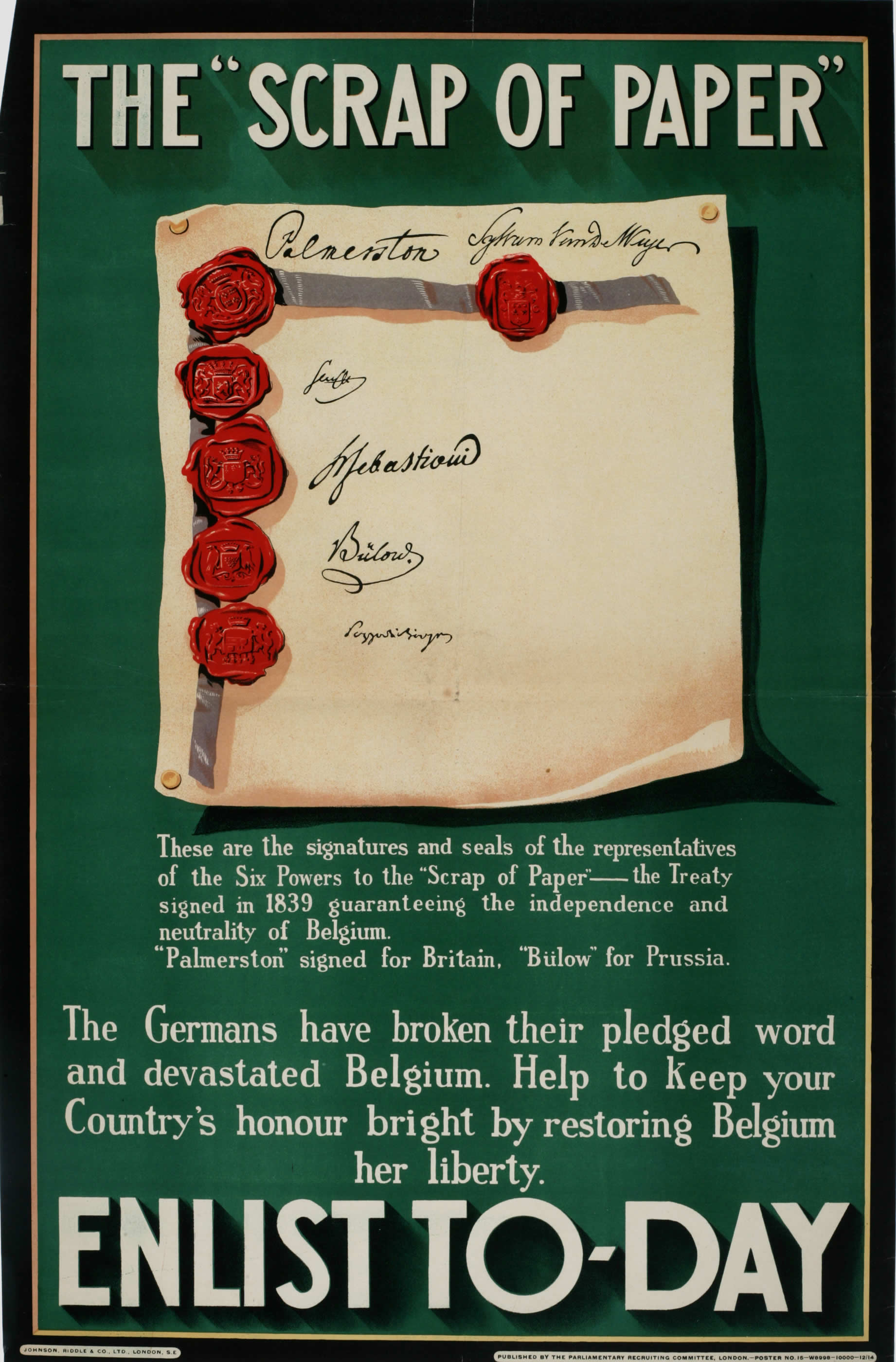
A British propaganda poster of World War I, concerning the guarantee of Belgian neutrality

A guarantee ensures the fulfilment of international obligations by a state promising to help another state fulfill its obligations when they are hindered by a third party.

Previously, other methods to ensure fulfillment of international obligations, like oaths or the receiving of hostages, were also called guarantees.

One example of such an obligation can be neutrality. For example, before World War I, the neutrality of Switzerland, Belgium and Luxembourg had been guaranteed.

== See also ==
- Treaty of London (1839)
- Swiss neutrality
- Treaty of London (1867)
