= Sanem Castle =

Castle in Luxembourg

Coordinates: 49°32′35.4″N 5°55′35.0″E

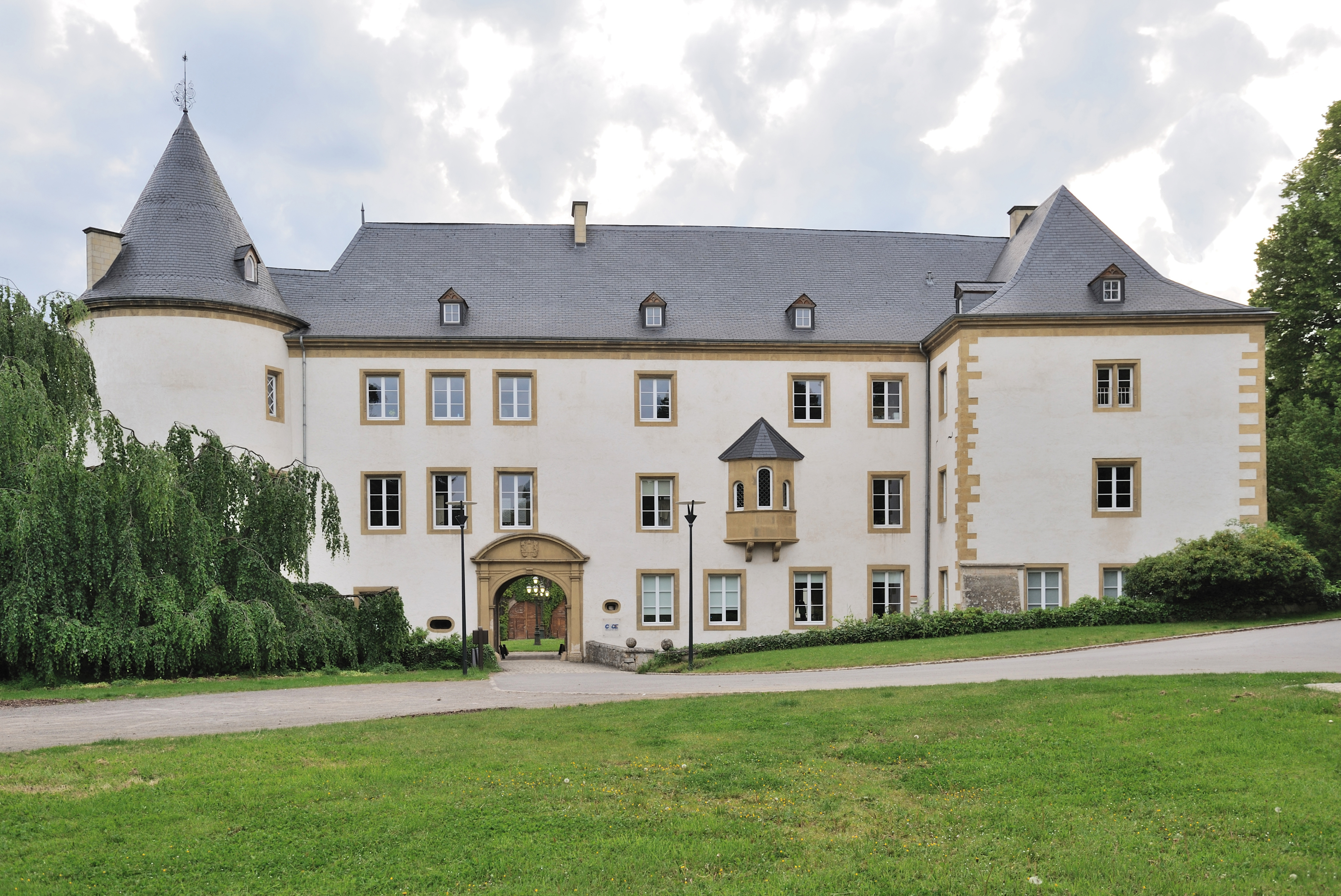
Sanem Castle

Sanem Castle (French: Château de Sanem, Luxembourgish: Schlass Suessem), located in the village of Sanem near Esch-sur-Alzette in south-western Luxembourg has a history dating back to the 13th century. Today's building was completed in 1557 after the medieval castle had been partly destroyed. The castle still maintains much of its original character.

== History ==
There are historic references mentioning a castle in Sanem during the 13th century when it was closely related to the nearby Soleuvre Castle. Originally, it was a typical medieval fortified castle complete with a moat and keep. In the 1550s (France was ruled by Henry II of France) French troops seriously damaged Sanem Castle. In about 1567, Frédéric de Hagen-Fleckenstein reconstructed the castle, placing the new buildings around a large rectangular courtyard. The old square-shaped tower dating back to the castle's Gothic origins remained as part of the new complex. The castle is built in the Renaissance style inspired by Italian architecture from the last half of the 15th century.

In the 17th century, the castle was burnt, rebuilt and occupied by Polish troops of the imperial army.

In 1753, Arnold-François von Daun, baron de Tornaco, bought the castle and moved in with great ceremony. Victor de Tornaco, 1860-1867 the first prime minister of Luxembourg, lived in Sanem Castle. The castle remained in the hands of the barons of Tornaco until 1950 when Auguste sold it to the Commune of Esch-sur-Alzette. Until 1999, it was then use as a home for children, under the name Kannerschlass. In 1965 a pavilion was constructed in the park next to the castle, which included accommodation for the director of the Kannerschlass.

In 1972, as a result of financial difficulties, it was taken over by the State of Luxembourg. In 1999, the Kannerschlass ceased to occupy the castle, and the building was refurbished.

As of January 2025, Samen castle has been vacant since 2016. Until 2016, the CVCE had its seat there.

== Gallery ==
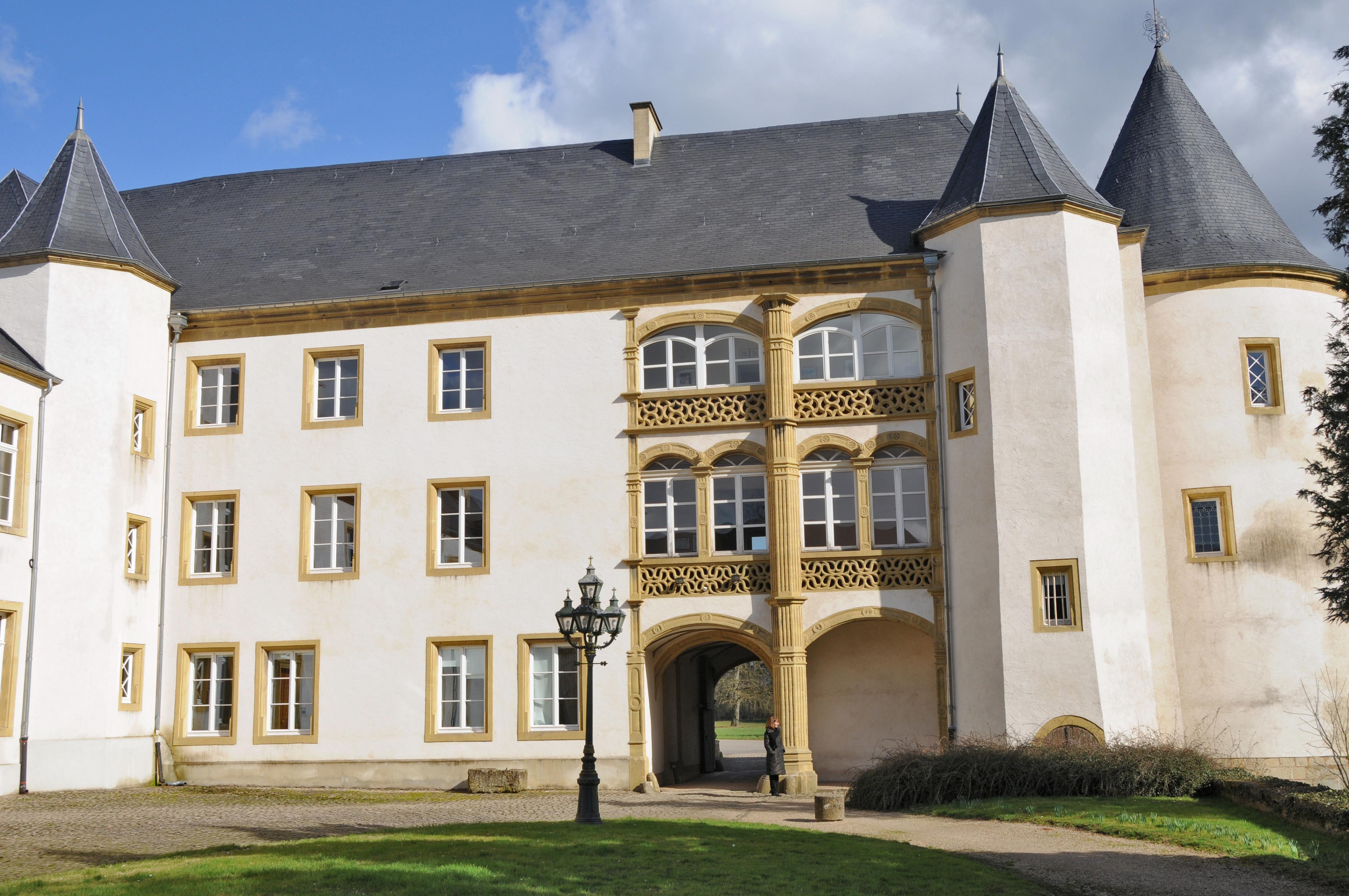
Inside the courtyard

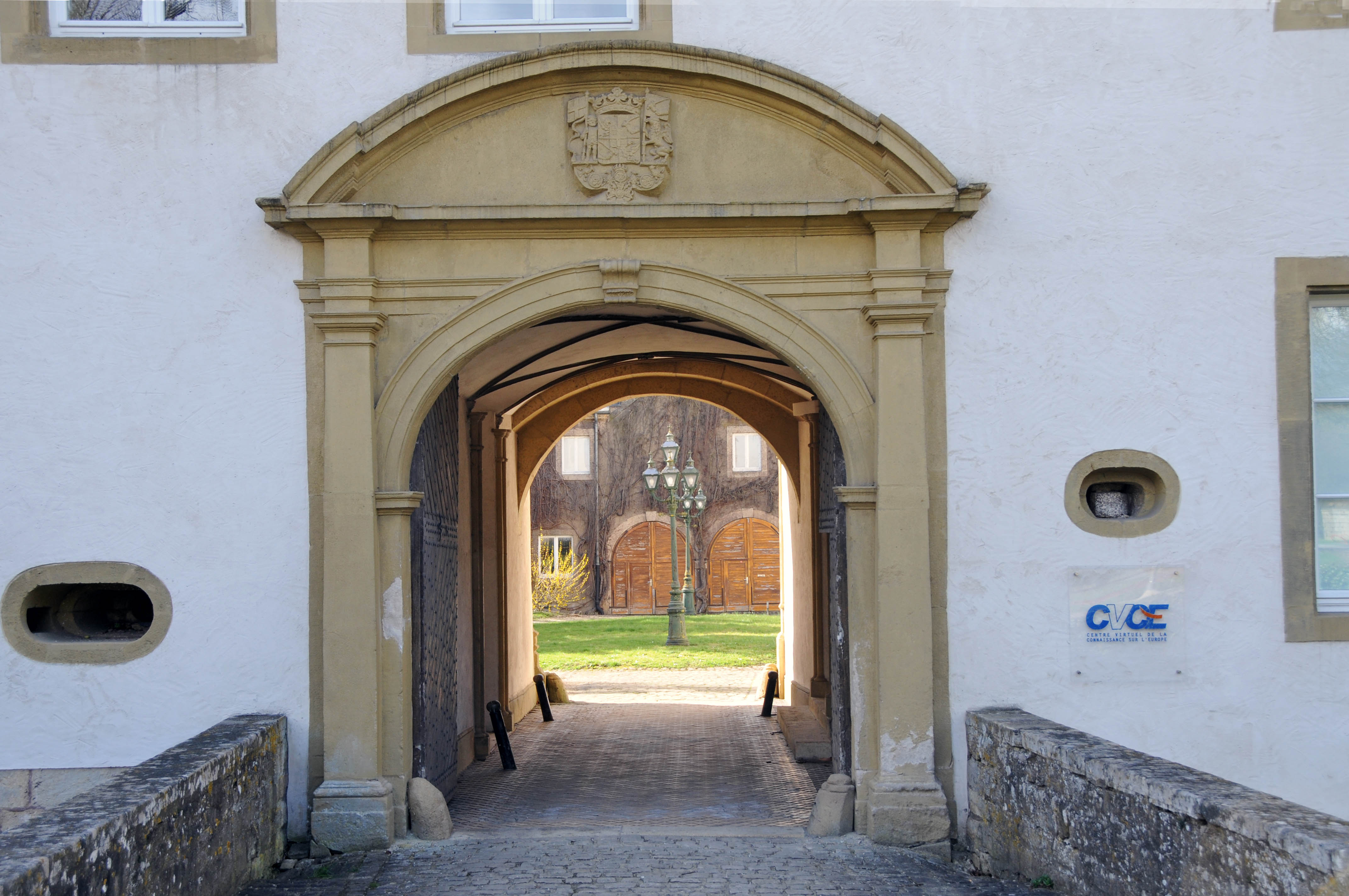
The entrance

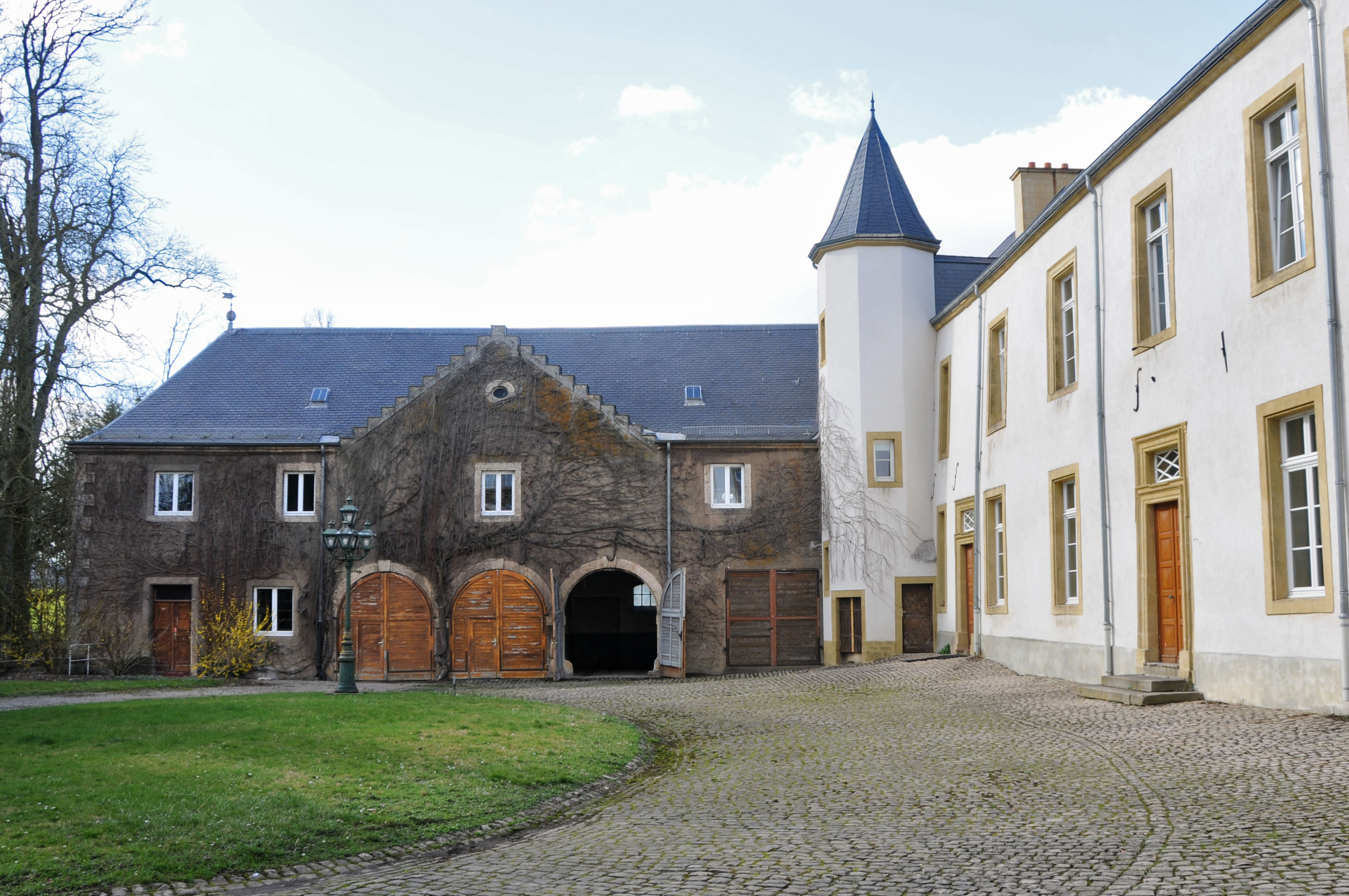
Rear side of the courtyard

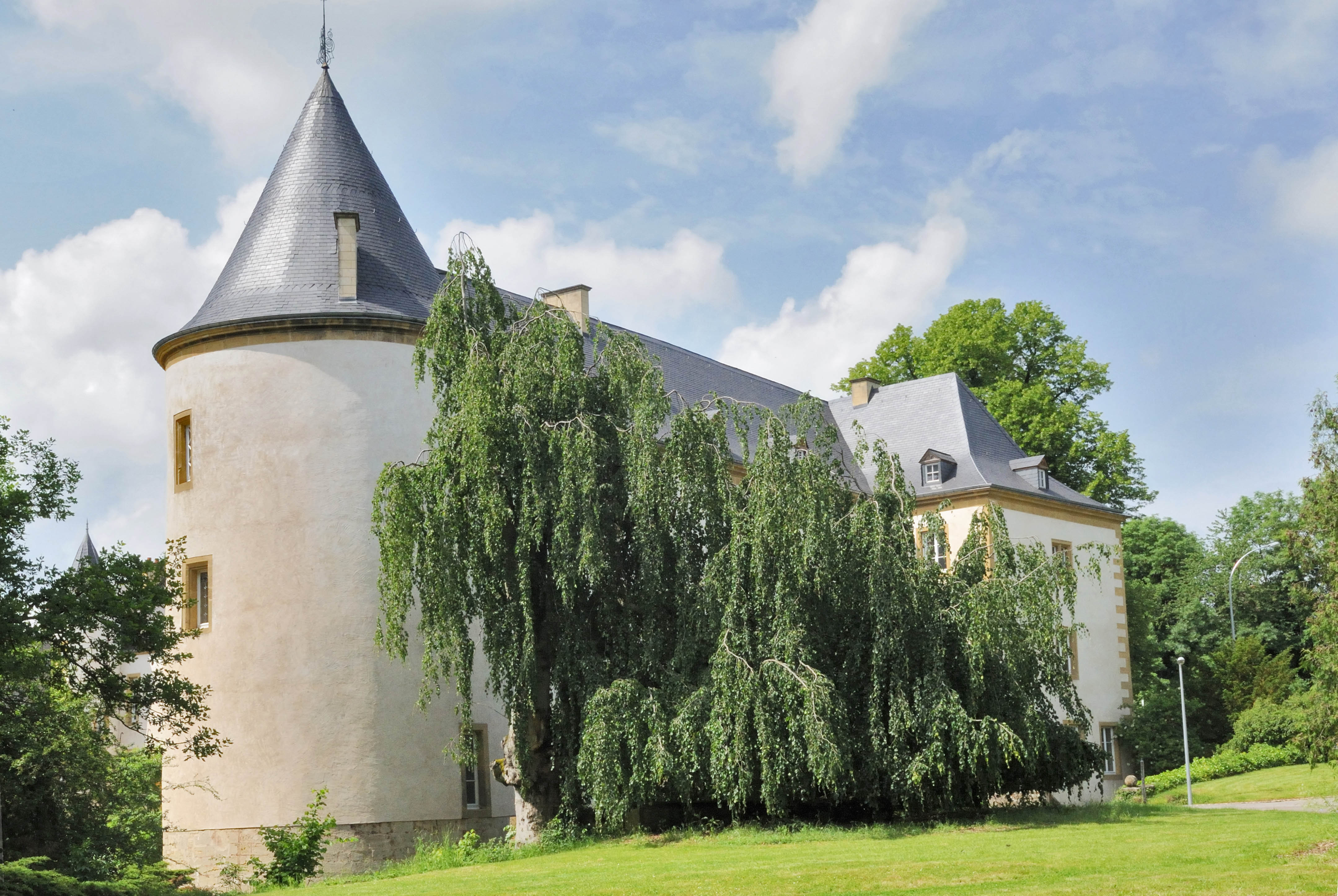
Outer wall with old linden tree

== See also ==
- List of castles in Luxembourg
