= Félix de Blochausen =

Prime Minister of Luxembourg from 1874 to 1885

Baron Félix de Blochausen
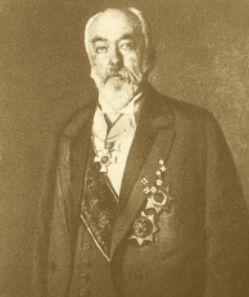

Prime Minister of Luxembourg
- In office 26 December 1874 – 20 February 1885
- Monarch: William III
- Preceded by: Emmanuel Servais
- Succeeded by: Édouard Thilges

Personal details
- Born: 5 March 1834 Schieren, Luxembourg
- Died: 15 November 1915 (aged 81) Schieren, Luxembourg
- Party: Independent
- Spouse: Estelle de Labeville

Baron Félix de Blochausen (5 March 1834 – 15 November 1915), was a Luxembourgish politician. An Orangist, he was prime minister of Luxembourg, serving for ten years, from 26 December 1874 until 20 February 1885.

He was the son of Frederic Joseph Prosper de Blochausen (1802–1886), who had been Chancellor of State of Luxembourg in The Hague.

== Minister for the Interior ==
He had a brief career as a lawyer and member of the Chamber of Deputies. Then, from 14 December 1866 to 3 December 1867 he was Director-General (Minister) for the Interior in the government of Victor de Tornaco. From 1872 to 1873 he was President of the Chamber of Deputies.

== Prime minister ==
On 26 December 1874, after Emmanuel Servais' resignation, de Blochausen was appointed prime minister and Director-General for Foreign Affairs. From 21 September to 12 October 1882, he was Director-General of Finances. Under his government, the criminal code and education were reformed. On 20 February 1885 de Blochausen had to resign due to an insider trading scandal.

=== Domestic policy ===
The Blochausen government introduced reforms of primary education. Against the opposition of conservative Deputies, it made it obligatory for children to attend school for six years, from ages 6 to 12. The reform gave rise to far-reaching debates over the role of the state in society, and the relationship between church and state. The new law made it the state's duty to organise public education, whereas the church retained a level of influence over education on the local level, and had powers of supervision over teachers.

== Post-government career ==
From 1893 until his death, Félix de Blochausen was the president of the Société agricole grand-ducale. He died on 15 November 1915 at his birthplace, Birtrange Castle.

== Honours ==
- Grand Cordon in the order of Leopold.
- Grand cross in the order of the oak crown.
- Grand cross in the order of the Netherlands Lion.
- Grand Cross Order of the Falcon, Saxe
- Knight 2nd class order of the House of Nassau.
- Knight First Class order of the Red Eagle
- Knight 1st Class Order of the Prussian Crown.
- Grand officer Legion of Honour
- 1st class order of Waldeck and Pyrmont.

== See also ==
- Blochausen Ministry

== Footnotes ==
Political offices
Preceded by Emmanuel Servais	Prime Minister of Luxembourg; 1874–1885	Succeeded by Édouard Thilges
Preceded by Emmanuel Servais	Director-General for Foreign Affairs; 1874–1885	Succeeded by Édouard Thilges
Preceded by Victor de Roebé	Director-General for Finances; 1882	Succeeded by Mathias Mongenast
