= Charles Auguste de Tornaco =

Baron Charles Auguste de Tornaco de Vervoz (12 December 1763 – 10 December 1837) was a Luxembourgish industrialist and politician. He was born and died at the castle of Vervoz near Clavier, Liège.

The Tornaco family came from Sanem. In 1738, Emperor Charles VI had ennobled them by creating them Barons, for their services in the Habsburg Netherlands. Charles-Auguste was the youngest son of Baron Jean-Théodore de Tornaco.

In his early life, he was a cuirassier officer in the Austrian military. He left the army to become a noble member of the second chamber of the Dutch Estates-General.

Under the French occupation, Napoleon named him mayor of Luxembourg City by decree on 5 April 1811, an office he held until June 1814. He cared for the good of the city with a deep sense of duty, and also managed to represent the city's interests to the occupying forces. Of particular note is his care for the typhus-afflicted soldiers in the city.

Under William I he remained a member of the Estates-General. Tornaco was an ardent champion of the cause of the pro-Dutch Orangists, who wanted the Grand Duchy of Luxembourg to remain in personal union with the Dutch King, and he rejected the Belgian Revolution of 1830. His two sons, who were more vehently active against the Belgian cause, were even decried as the "Tornaco mob".

From 1818 to 1827 he was mayor of Sanem, where the De Tornaco family were the lords of the castle.

Charles Auguste married Elisabeth de Berlo-Suys (1775-1856) on 11 November 1800 at Berloz. The couple had three children:

- Sidonie de Tornaco (1804-1876)
- Victor de Tornaco, Prime Minister of Luxembourg
- Mathilde de Tornaco (1813-1885), married Florent de Berlaymont (1815-1884) on 21 May 1840

== See also ==
- De Tornaco

Political offices
| Preceded by Jean-Baptiste Servais | Mayor of Luxembourg City; 1811 – 1814 | Succeeded by Bonaventure Dutreux-Boch |
