= René Blum =

René Blum may refer to:

- René Blum (impresario) (1878–1942), French ballet choreographer
- René Blum (politician) (1889–1967), Luxembourgish politician
