= Émile Servais =

Luxembourgish politician

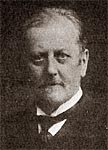

Chairman of the Luxembourg Comité de Salut Public
- In office 9 January 1918 – 10 January 1918
- Preceded by: Established
- Succeeded by: Dissolved

Personal details
- Born: 26 September 1847; Luxembourg
- Died: 24 October 1928; Luxembourg
- Occupation: Politician

Émile Servais (26 September 1847 – 24 October 1928) was a Luxembourgish left liberal politician. He was an engineer by profession.

Émile Servais (26 September 1847 – 24 October 1928) was a politician who served as the Chairman of the Luxembourg Comité de Salut Public from 9 January 1918 to 10 January 1918. He is known for his significant contributions in this political role and his impact on Luxembourg's history.

On 9 January 1919, a company of the Luxembourgish army revolted against the Grand Duchess Marie-Adélaïde, and declared itself to be the army of a new socialist republic. The seventy-two-year-old Servais was chosen by an eight-member 'Committee for Public Safety' as the new head of the revolutionary government, under the title of 'Chairman'. President of the Chamber of Deputies François Altwies requested that French soldiers intervene, and, eager to end what they considered to be a pro-Belgian uprising, France ended the rebellion and deposed Servais.

He was the son of former Prime Minister Emmanuel Servais. In 1877, Émile was awarded the Order of the Oak Crown.

== Life ==
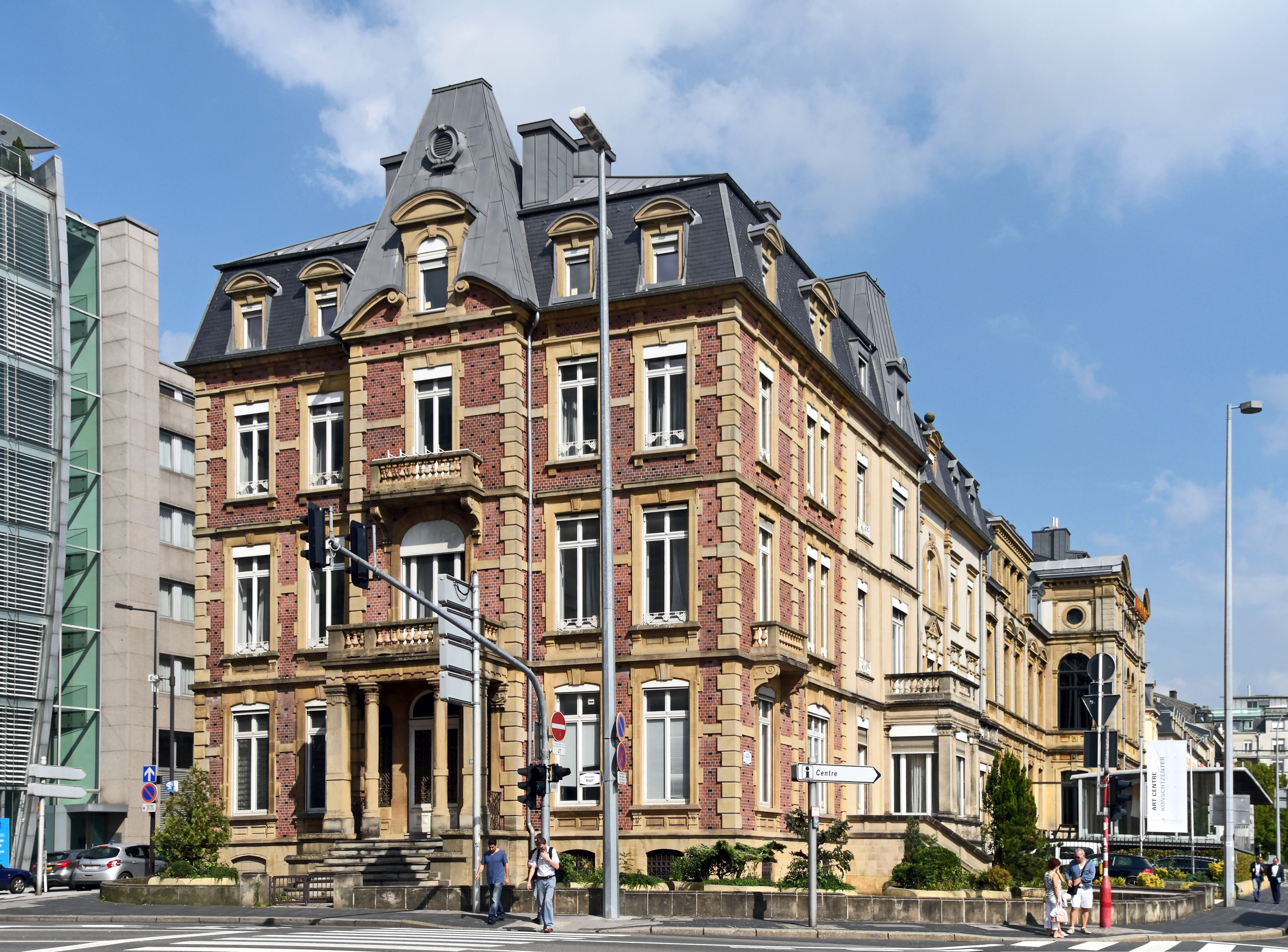
Emile Servais' house in the centre of Luxembourg City.

He was the son of Emmanuel Servais (1811-1890). After training as an engineer, from 1863 to 1868 at the École des arts et manufactures et des mines in Liège, he was director of the foundry in Eschweiler-Aue from 1869 to 1872. After this he was director of the foundry of Colmar from 1873 to 1877, director of the Hollerich foundry in 1877 and of the Weilerbach foundry in 1878. In 1877 he received the Order of the Oak Crown.

For 50 years he was on the board of directors of the S.A. luxembourgeoise des chemins de fer et minières Prince-Henri and in 1878 was government commissioner for the World Exhibition in Paris. He was the co-founder and manager of the S.A. des hauts-fourneaux de Rumelange-Ottange and later manager of the Deutsch-Luxemburgische Bergwerks- und Hütten-AG, and sat on the board of several industrial companies.

Servais was a left-liberal politician, who campaigned for universal suffrage and better conditions for workers. Together with Charles Munchen, Charles-André Engel and his brother Charles Servais, he founded a newspaper, Das Echo (L'Echo from 1891), which appeared from 18 October 1890 to 1 January 1898, at first daily, later only every week. In 1893 he was elected to the city council of the city of Luxembourg. From 1893 to 1899 he also sat in the Chamber of Deputies.

After the end of World War I, he was one of the main campaigners demanding Grand Duchess Marie-Adélaïde's abdication and the establishment of a republic.

On 9 January 1919 the Comité de Salut Public, consisting of various left-liberal politicians, was founded. Émile Servais was its president. He was then also declared the first President of the Republic of Luxembourg. As the Republic was not accepted by the Chamber, and French troops suppressed the republican movement the following day, Servais never took office.

Servais was married to Louise Majerus (1855-1924), the daughter of François Majerus, his predecessor as director of the Colmar foundry. They had a child, Marguerite Mongenast-Servais.

On the corner of the Boulevard Royal and what is now the Boulevard Roosevelt he built a villa, which was unusually built of red brick. One of the few houses on Boulevard Royal from the time before the First World War, it is now the seat of the ABBL.
