= Centre Virtuel de la Connaissance sur l'Europe =

Research organisation maintaining a digital library on European integration

Digital Research in European Studies
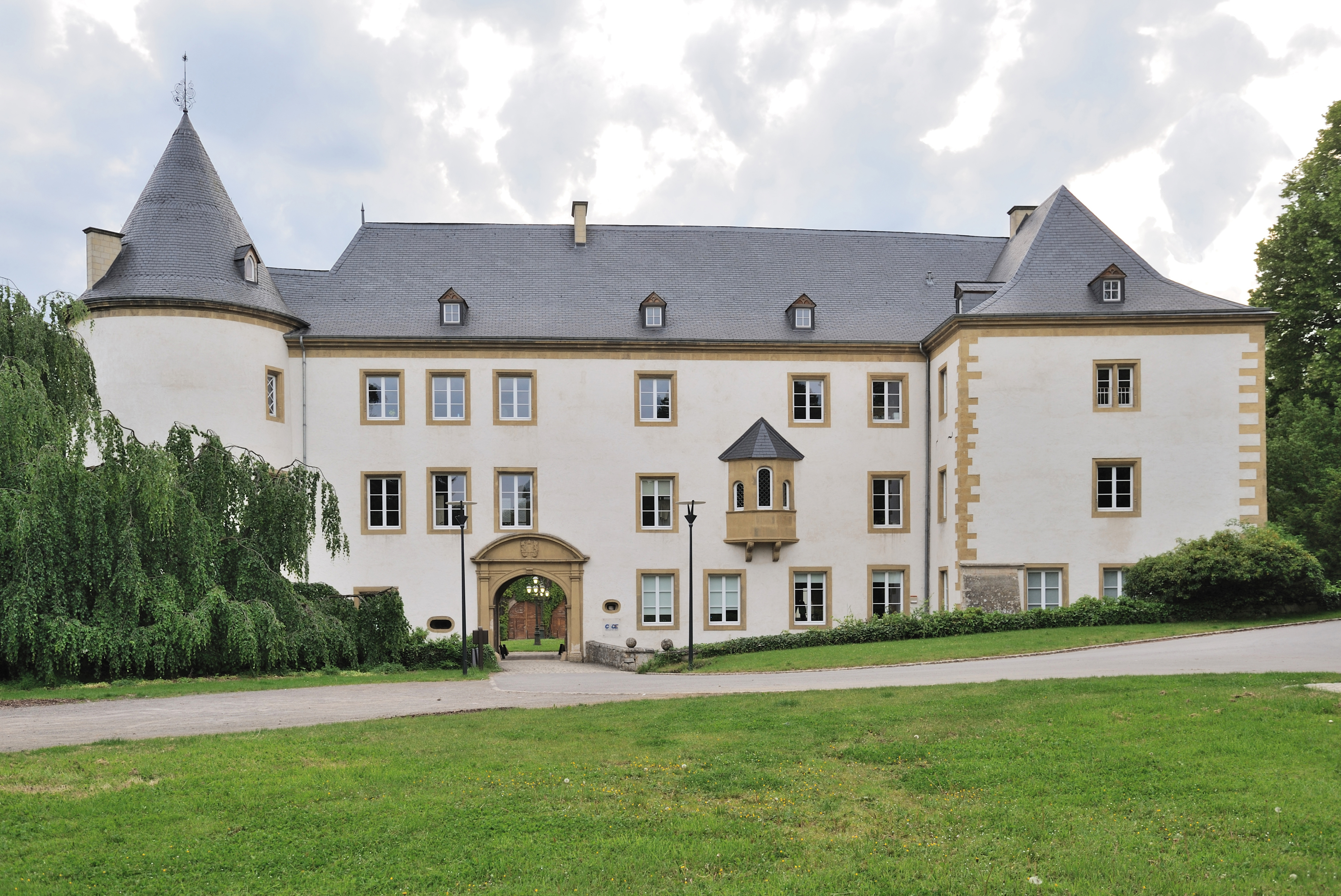
- Sanem Castle
- Purpose: European integration studies Digital humanities
- Location: Sanem, Luxembourg (until 2016)
- Coordinates: 49°32′35.4″N 5°55′35.0″E
- Website: www.cvce.eu/en

The Centre Virtuel de la Connaissance sur l'Europe (French for "Virtual Centre for Knowledge on Europe "; abbreviated CVCE) was an interdisciplinary research and documentation centre dedicated to European integration studies. It was a public corporation founded by law on 7 August 2002.

It developed a digital library of multimedia resources related to European unification efforts since World War II, including the development of related international bodies such as the European Union. The library is available in English and French; some documents are available in other languages. On 1 July 2016, the CVCE was integrated into the University of Luxembourg, and the Centre for Contemporary and Digital History (C²DH) has taken on the task of maintaining and developing the CVCE.eu website.

The digital library was formerly named the European Navigator (ENA).

The large multimedia knowledge base includes original texts (treaties, etc.), video and audio clips, press articles, photos, interactive maps, cartoons and tables.

== Parts ==
- 'Historical Events' contains material on all the events that have contributed to the European integration process;
- 'European Organizations' looks at the operation of all the institutions of the European Union (e.g. European Parliament, European Commission) and the various other European institutions;
- 'Special Files' are devoted to specific subjects;
- 'Interviews' contains exclusive interviews with people who have played a part in the European integration process (Jacques Santer, Otto von Habsburg, etc.);
- 'Research& Teaching' provides resources for teachers to enable their pupils to learn about European integration.

== See also ==
- European Integration
- European Library
- Europeana
- History of the European Union
