= Vervoz =

Coordinates: 50.3967°N 5.3735°E

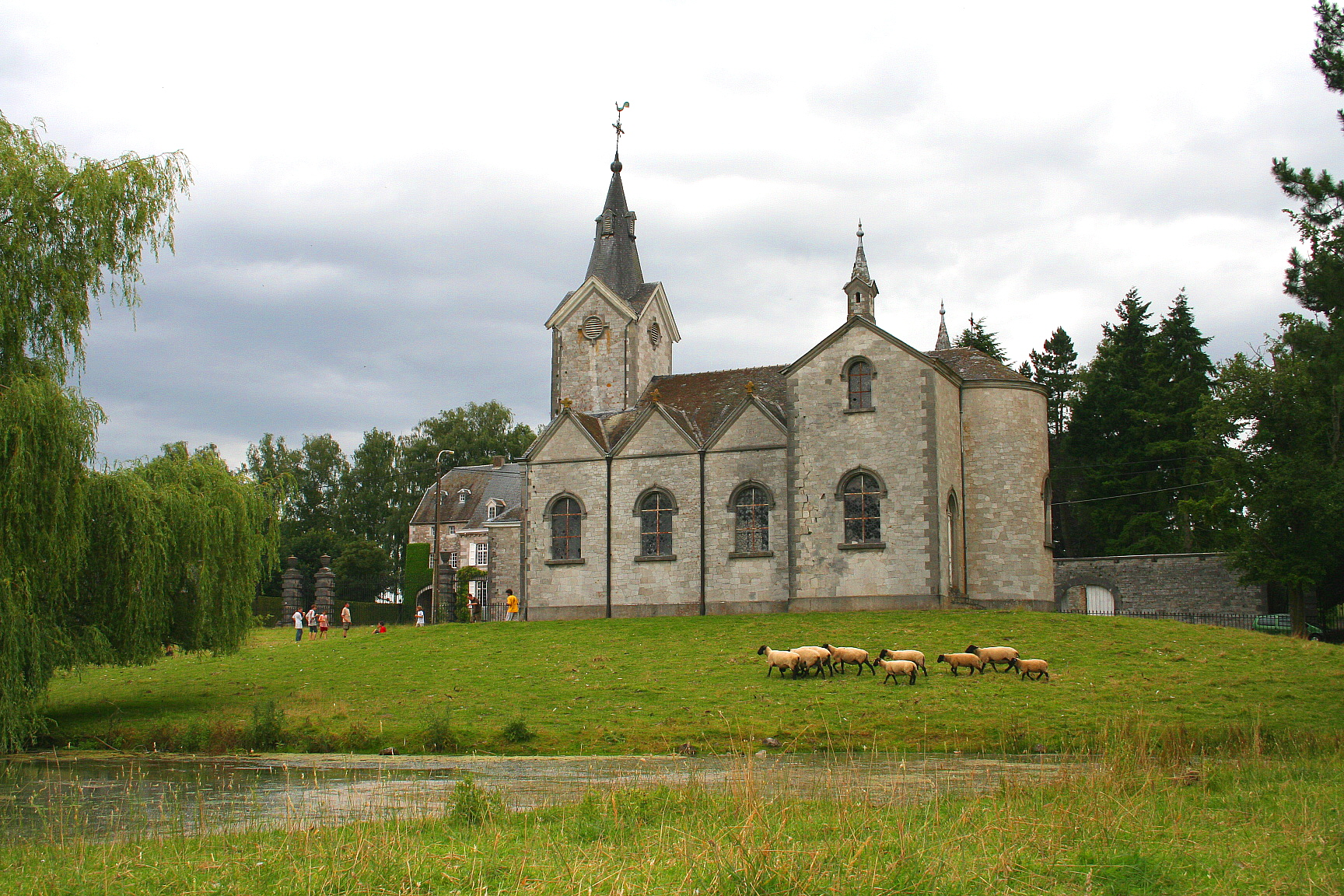
La chapelle Saint-Hubert.

Vervoz is a hamlet of Wallonia in the municipality of Clavier, district of Ocquier, located in the province of Liège, Belgium.

It is close to the borders of the three provinces of Liège, Namur and Luxembourg and lies near the village of Ocquier.

The hamlet is on the ancient Roman road Tongres-Arlon. It is registered on the list of exceptional heritage of Wallonia.

== Places of interest ==
Tornaco Castle, the small chapel nearby as well as the surrounding farms all have the same building style, constructed in the grey stone characteristic of the region. (See also De Tornaco)

== Notable people ==
- Abel Lurkin (1891-1963), writer
- Jean Lurkin (1896-1964), writer
