= 1857 Luxembourg general election =

Partial general elections were held in Luxembourg on Thursday 17 September 1857, electing members of the Assembly of Estates.

== Results ==
Canton	Seats	Affiliation	Candidate	First round	Second round
Canton	Seats	Affiliation	Candidate	Votes	Votes
Luxembourg	6	Liberal	Théodore Pescatore (Note: Elected in the first round with an absolute majority)	155	
Luxembourg	6	Liberal	Norbert Metz	108	
Luxembourg	6	Liberal	Victor de Tornaco	104	
Luxembourg	6	Liberal	Michel Jonas	95	
Luxembourg	6	Liberal	Eugène Fischer (Note: Elected in a run-off vote in the second round)	83	96
Luxembourg	6	Liberal	Dominique Stifft	76	94
Luxembourg	6	Clerical	Ferdinand Pescatore	71	62
Luxembourg	6	Clerical	Jean-Pierre David Heldenstein	69	63
Luxembourg	6	Clerical	De Wacquant	69	
Luxembourg	6	Clerical	Simonis	68	
Luxembourg	6	Clerical	Gabriel de Marie	64	
Luxembourg	6		Turnout	169	
Mersch	2	Liberal	Michel Clément	45	
Mersch	2	Liberal	Jacques	44	
Mersch	2	Clerical	Hippert	17	
Mersch	2	Clerical	Gengler	16	
Mersch	2		Turnout		
Grevenmacher	3	Clerical	Faber	30	
Grevenmacher	3	Clerical	Lessel	30	
Grevenmacher	3	Liberal	Witry	29	
Grevenmacher	3	Clerical	André	28	
Grevenmacher	3	Liberal	Joseph Ritter	25	
Grevenmacher	3	Liberal	Welter	22	
Grevenmacher	3		Turnout		
Diekirch		Liberal	Ulrich	109	
Diekirch		Liberal	Mathieu	108	
Diekirch		Liberal	Arens	99	
Diekirch		Liberal	Greisch	97	
Diekirch		Clerical	Thilges	38	
Diekirch		Clerical	Jean Juttel	34	
Diekirch		Clerical	De la Porte	29	
Diekirch		Clerical	D'Olimart	28	
Diekirch			Turnout	136	
