= Henri Vannérus =

Luxemburgish politician

Henri Vannérus (29 July 1833 – 16 May 1921) was a Luxembourgish politician, jurist, and diplomat.

An Orangist, he twice served as Minister for Justice, in the governments of Victor de Tornaco (1864 – 1866) and Emmanuel Servais (1867 – 1874). Vannérus was later a member of the Council of State from 1874 until his death in 1921, and served as President for two spells totalling twenty years (1888 – 1889, 1895 – 1914). After his second stint as President of the Council of State, he became Luxembourg's chargé d'affaires in Paris. Throughout this period, he formed a close connection with Paul Eyschen and Mathias Mongenast, thanks in no small part to all being from the town of Diekirch.

There is a street in South Bonnevoie, Luxembourg City, named after Vannérus (rue Henri Vannérus).

== Footnotes ==
Political offices
Preceded by Bernard-Hubert Neuman	Director-General for Justice; 1st time 1864 – 1866	Succeeded by Léon de la Fontaine
Preceded by Léon de la Fontaine	Director-General for Justice; 2nd time 1867 – 1874	Succeeded by Alphonse Funck
Preceded by Emmanuel Servais	President of the Council of State; 1st time 1888 – 1889	Succeeded by Édouard Thilges
Preceded by Édouard Thilges	President of the Council of State; 2nd time 1895 – 1914	Succeeded by Victor Thorn
