= Treaty of London (1867) =

International treaty signed on 11 May 1867

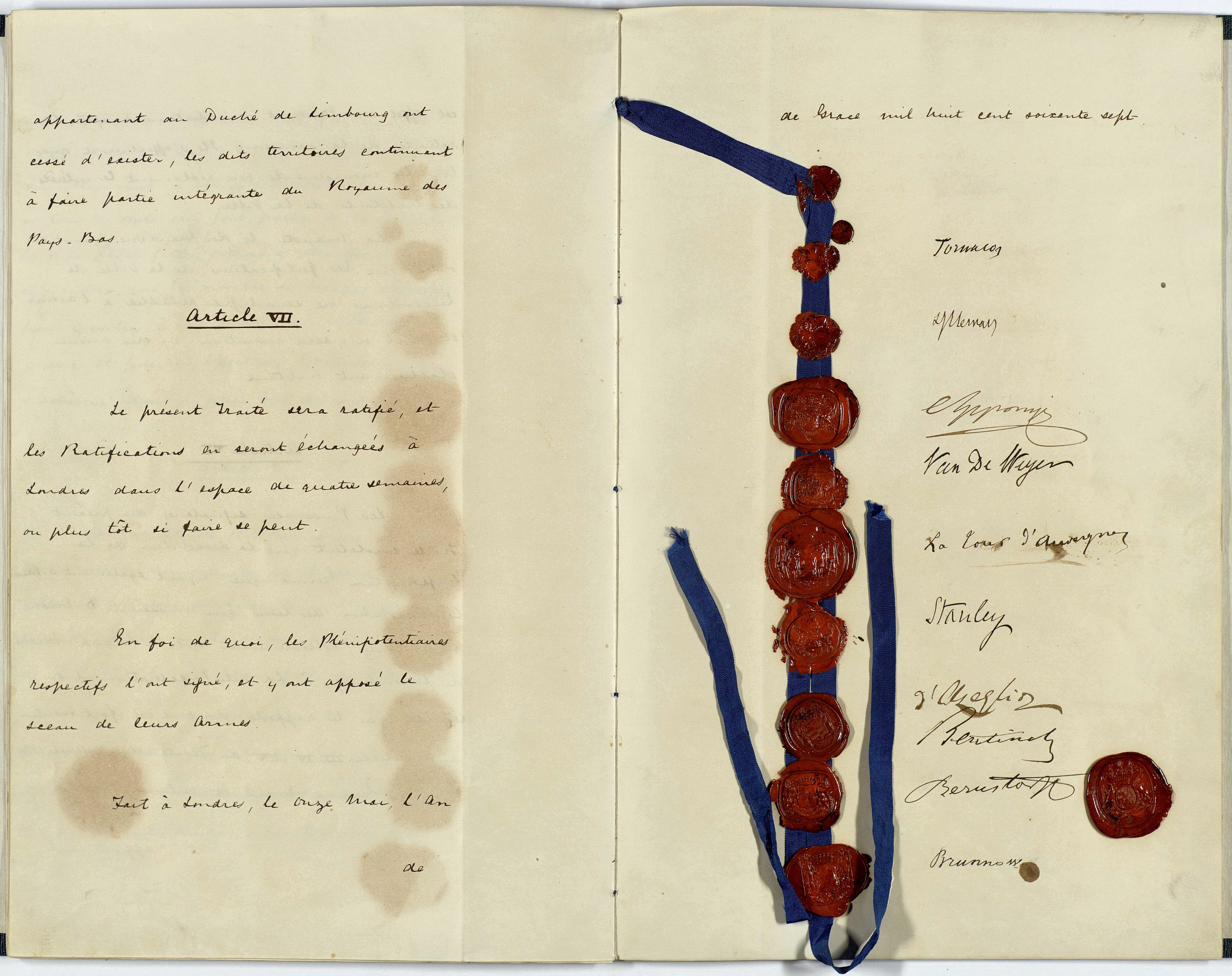
- Signatures on the 1867 Treaty of London.
- Type: Multilateral treaty
- Signed: 11 May 1867
- Location: London, United Kingdom
- Original signatories: Austria-Hungary; Belgium; France; Kingdom of Italy; Luxembourg; Netherlands; Prussia; Russia; United Kingdom
- Ratifiers: Austria-Hungary; Belgium; France; Kingdom of Italy; Luxembourg; Netherlands; Prussia; Russia; United Kingdom

The Treaty of London (French: Traité de Londres), often called the Second Treaty of London after the 1839 Treaty, granted Luxembourg full independence and neutrality. It was signed on 11 May 1867 in the aftermath of the Austro-Prussian War and the Luxembourg Crisis. It had wide-reaching consequences for Luxembourg and for relations among Europe's great powers.

== Effects ==
The immediate effect of the treaty, established in Article I, was the reaffirmation of the personal union between the Netherlands and Luxembourg under the House of Orange-Nassau. It lasted until 1890, when Wilhelmina ascended the Dutch throne. As a form of agnatic succession was then in effect in Luxembourg (under the Nassau Family Pact of 1783), the grand duchy could not pass in the female line. Instead it was the older branch of the House of Nassau (Nassau-Weilburg, now called Luxembourg-Nassau) that inherited that dignity, giving Luxembourg its own exclusive dynasty.

The Luxembourg Crisis had erupted after French Emperor Napoleon III attempted to buy Luxembourg from the Dutch King William III. Consequently, maintaining Dutch dominance over the de jure independent Luxembourg, free from French interference, was of paramount importance to Prussia.

The neutrality of Luxembourg, established by the First Treaty of London, was also reaffirmed. The parties that did not sign the earlier treaty were to become guarantors of Luxembourg's neutrality (an exception was Belgium, which was, itself, bound to neutrality).

To ensure Luxembourg's neutrality, the (westward) fortifications of Luxembourg City, known as the "Gibraltar of the North", were to be demolished and never to be rebuilt. To the east, the city was protected by a deep river valley and medieval fortifications that still exist. Dismantling the westward and underground fortifications took sixteen years at a cost of 1.5 million gold francs and required the destruction of over 24 km (15 mi) of underground defences and 4 hectares (9.9 acres) of casemates, batteries, barracks, etc. The still very large residual fortifications of Luxembourg City are now part of the World Heritage List of the UNESCO.

Furthermore, the Prussian Army garrison in Luxembourg since 1815 in accordance with the decisions of the Congress of Vienna, was to be withdrawn.

The Austro-Prussian War had led to the collapse of the German Confederation. Two former members, the Grand Duchy of Luxembourg and the Duchy of Limburg, had the Dutch king as their head of state (as Grand Duke of Luxembourg and Duke of Limburg). To further clarify the position in the wake of the death of the confederation, the Treaty of London affirmed the end of the confederation and stated that Limburg was henceforth to be considered with all its "territories" an "integral part of the Kingdom of the Netherlands".

The independent Grand Duchy of Luxembourg, still linked to the Netherlands by a personal union, would rejoin the newly re-established German customs union, the Zollverein, in which it would remain until 1 January 1919, long after the personal union had ended in 1890.

== Signatories ==
The treaty was signed by representatives of all of the Great Powers of Europe:

- Austria-Hungary, represented by Count Rudolf Apponyi
- The Kingdom of Belgium, represented by Sylvain Van de Weyer
- The French Empire, represented by the Prince de La Tour d'Auvergne-Lauraguais
- The Kingdom of Italy, represented by the Marquis d'Azeglio
- The Grand Duchy of Luxembourg, represented by Baron de Tornaco and Emmanuel Servais
- The Kingdom of the Netherlands, represented by the Baron Bentinck
- The Kingdom of Prussia, represented by the Count Bernstorff-Stintenburg
- The Russian Empire, represented by Baron Brunnow
- The United Kingdom of Great Britain and Ireland, represented by Edward Stanley, 15th Earl of Derby

Italy was originally not invited, but King Victor Emmanuel II persuaded the other kings and emperors to invite his representative. The treaty did not directly affect Italy in any appreciable manner, as she had little relation to Luxembourg. However, it marked the first occasion on which Italy was invited to partake in an international conference on the basis of being a Great Power, and, therefore, was of symbolic value to the fledgling Italian kingdom.

== See also ==
- Treaty of London, for similarly titled treaties
