= Léon de la Fontaine =

Luxembourgish botanist (1819-1892)

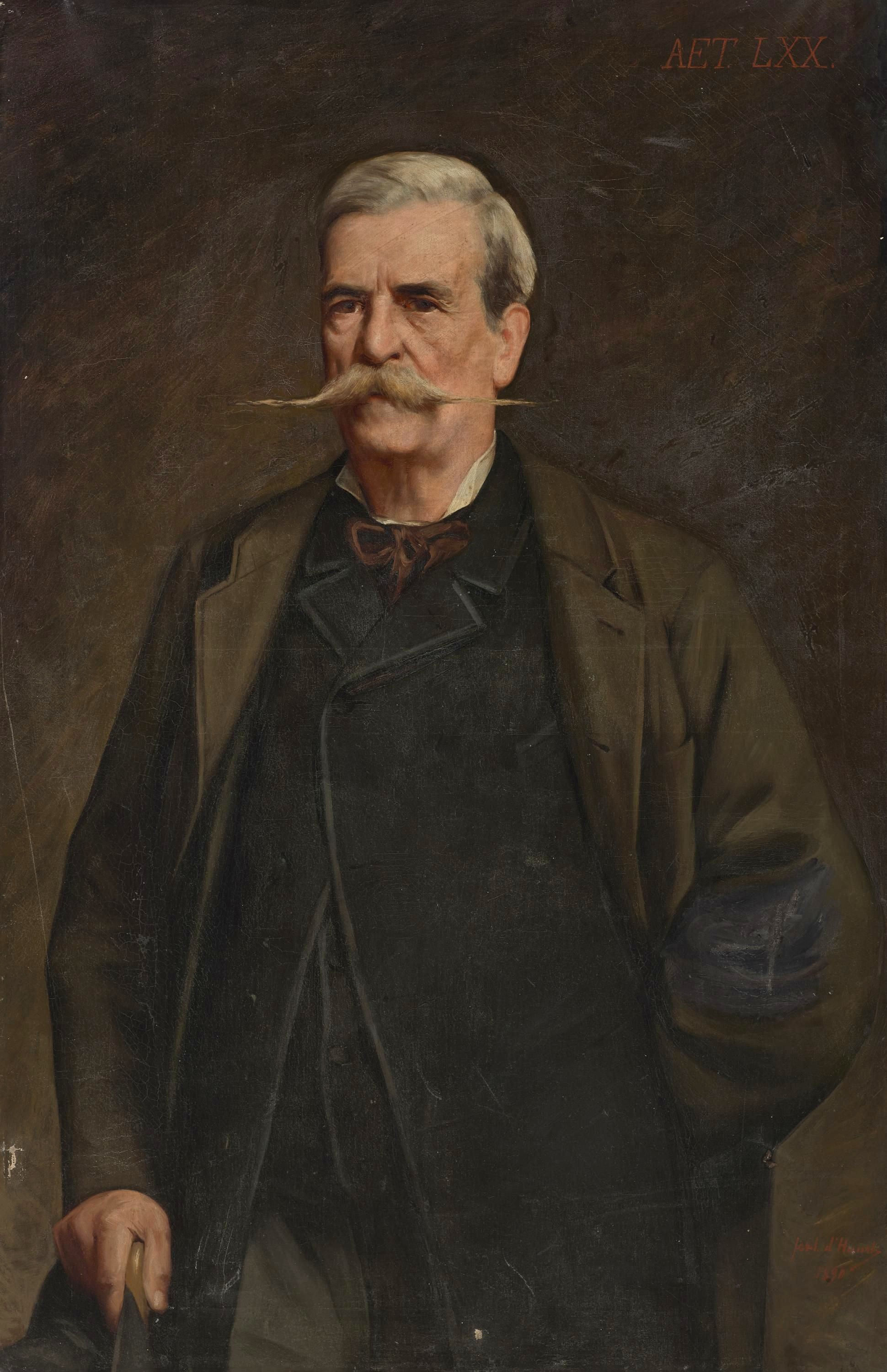
Portrait of Léon de la Fontaine (Ferdinand d'Huart, 1890)

François Joseph Albert Léon de la Fontaine (18 November 1819 – 5 February 1892) was a Luxembourgish lawyer, politician and botanist.

On 21 May 1848 he became a member of the Constituent Assembly, where he replaced Charles Munchen, who was sent to the Frankfurt National Assembly. From 14 December 1866 until 18 June 1867 he was Director General (Minister) of Justice, and initially also of Finance in the Tornaco Ministry.

From 1867 he was a member of the Société des Sciences naturelles the later scientific section of the Institut grand-ducal, a founding member of the botanical society (Société botanique). He was particularly interested in ferns.

He married Anne Marie Jos. Fr. Collart (1827–1893), the daughter of Charles Joseph Collart (1775–1841), on 27 February 1852. He was the son of Gaspard-Théodore-Ignace de la Fontaine and the brother of Edmond de la Fontaine ("Dicks") and of Alphonse de la Fontaine.

== Publications ==
- Fontaine, Léon de la (1885): Notiz zu "Polypodium aculeatum, Linné". (An den botanischen Verein zu Luxemburg). Recueil des Mémoires et des Travaux publiés par la Société botanique du G.-D. de Luxembourg, 9-10 (1883–1884): 101–152.
- Fontaine, Léon de la (1886): Notiz zu Asplenium germanicum, Weis. (Aspl. Brenii, Retz; Aspl. murale, Bernh.; Aspl. alternifolium, Jacq.). Recueil des Mémoires et des Travaux publiés par la Société botanique du G.-D. de Luxembourg, 11(1885–1886): 69–89.
- Fontaine, Léon de la (1886): Notice sur les Fougères de la flore luxembourgeoise. Rapport lu en séance du 19 décembre 1885, sur les Fougères trouvées par M. Reisen, en Ardennes. Recueil des Mémoires et des Travaux publiés par la Société botanique du G.-D. de Luxembourg 11(1885–1886), 90-126.
