= Tornaco Castle =

Castle in Clavier, Belgium

- Belgium
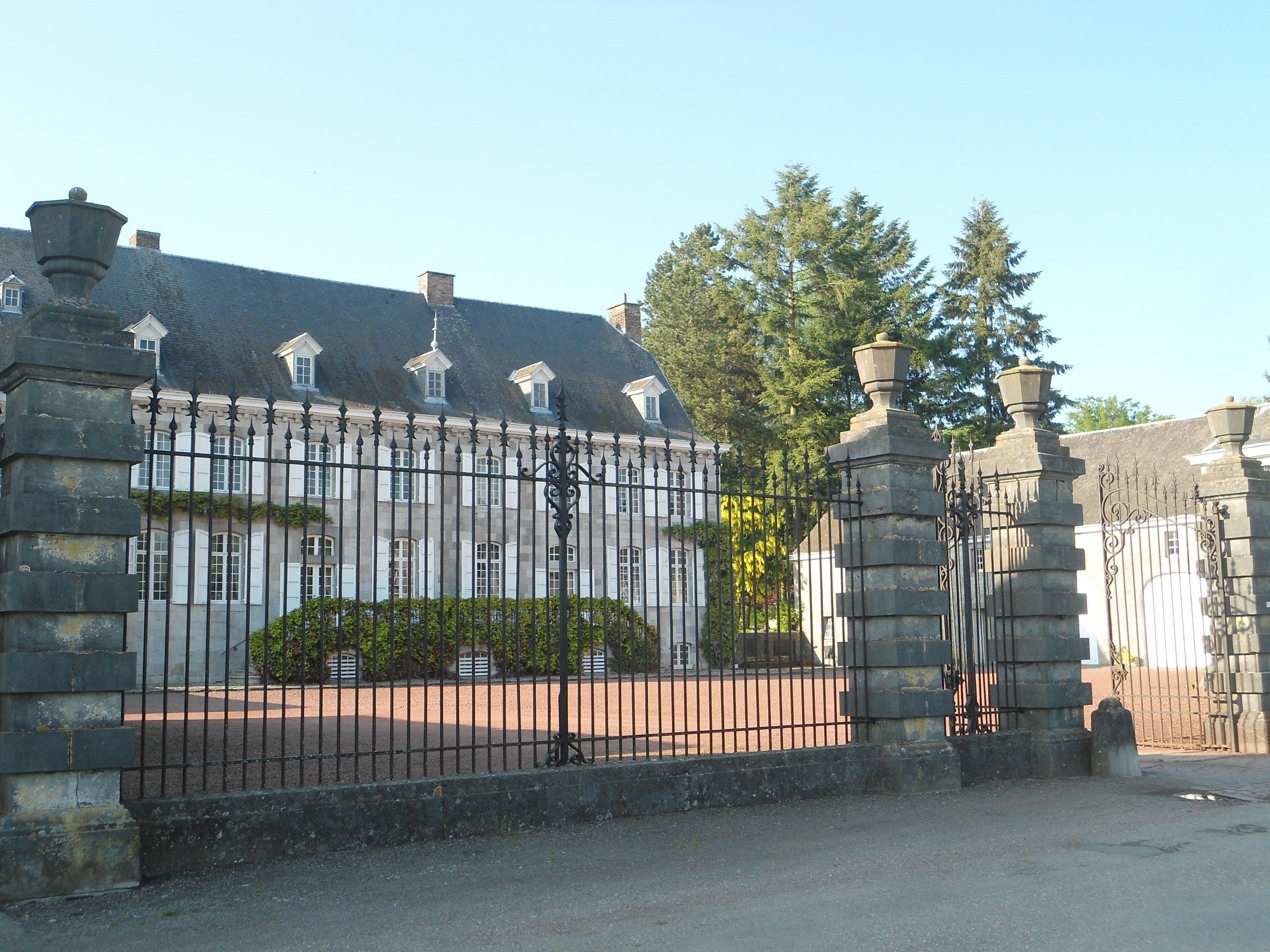
- Vervoz Castle

Site information
- Type: Castle

Location
- Coordinates: 50.3971°N 5.3727°E

Tornaco Castle is a castle in Vervoz, in the municipality of Clavier, Belgium.

== History ==
The castle was built around 1764 by Baron Victor de Tornaco, probably on the site of an older structure. The Tornaco family has been the sole owner of the castle since its construction.

== Description ==
The property faces the pond and is accessed via a gate interrupted by imposing limestone pillars crowned with a mid-19th-century vase. It forms an interesting and cohesive ensemble, dating primarily from the mid-18th century.

The buildings, constructed of limestone rubble, are arranged around a manor courtyard, laid out in the 18th century from a much older core to the north. These buildings are symmetrically distributed to the east and west in an L-shape. The outbuildings, originally in the 18th century and later remodeled during the 19th century, include tack rooms, stables, and carriage houses.

It is adjoined by a porch surmounted by a 17th-century tower, the only structure to have survived. To the west, a handsome carriage entrance rises two stories above. A terrace, bordered by a wrought-iron railing, is accessible via a beautiful double-spiral staircase. The castle is still inhabited by the Tornaco family.

On the night of 4-5 June 2020, a fire broke out, causing one fatality and significant damage.

The castle is currently (2025) being restored.

== See also ==
- List of castles in Belgium
