= De Tornaco =

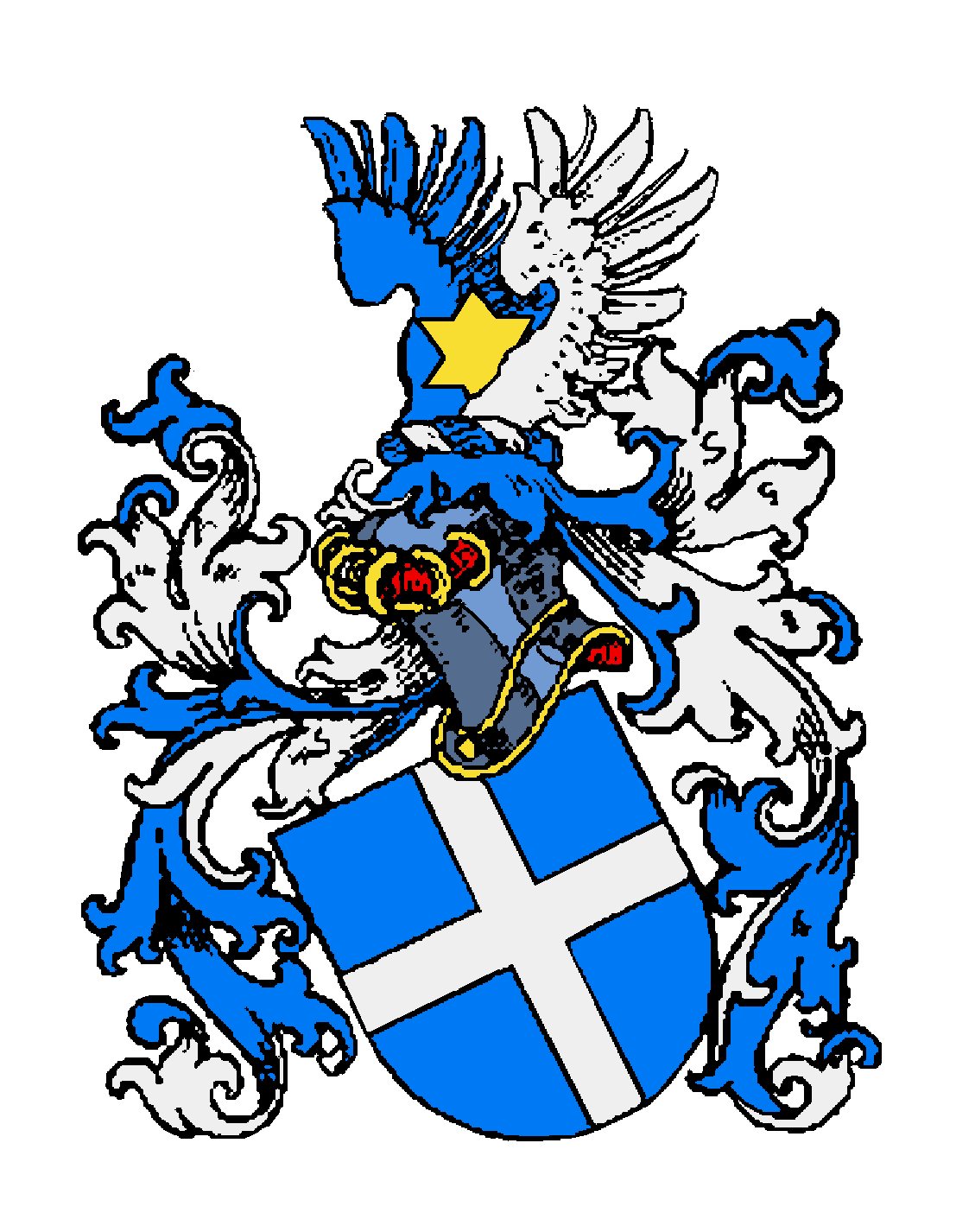
Tornaco coat of arms

De Tornaco is a Belgian and Luxembourgish noble family.

== Members ==
- Arnould François de Tornaco (1696–1766)
- Charles Auguste de Tornaco (1763–1837), industrialist and mayor of Luxembourg City, married Elisabeth de Berlo-Suys.
  - Algegonde Ursula de Tornaco (1803–1856) married Adrien de Lannoy-Clervaux (1793–1854)
  - Sidonie de Tornaco (1804–1876)
  - Victor de Tornaco (1805–1875), prime minister of Luxembourg
    - Charles de Tornaco (1847–1912)
      - Raymond de Tornaco
        - Charles de Tornaco (1927–1953), Belgian Formula 2 and Formula 1 driver
  - Mathilde de Tornaco (1813–1885)
  - Camille de Tornaco (1807–1880)
  - Auguste de Tornaco (?)
- Arnould de Tornaco (1840–1885)
- Jean-Théodore de Tornaco de Vervoz

== See also ==
- Tornaco Castle
