= Édouard Thilges =

Prime Minister of Luxembourg (1817–1904)

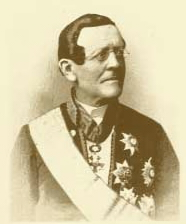

Prime Minister of Luxembourg
- In office 20 February 1885 – 22 September 1888
- Monarch: William III
- Preceded by: Félix de Blochausen
- Succeeded by: Paul Eyschen

Personal details
- Born: 17 February 1817 Clervaux, Luxembourg
- Died: 9 July 1904 (aged 87) Luxembourg, Luxembourg
- Party: Independent

Jules Georges Édouard Thilges (17 February 1817 – 9 July 1904) was a Luxembourgish politician. He served as prime minister of Luxembourg for over three years, from 20 February 1885 until 22 September 1888.

Born in 1817 in Clervaux, from 1833 to 1838 he studied law at the universities of Brussels and Liège. In 1841 he became a lawyer at the tribunal of Diekirch.

From 22 September 1854 to 21 May 1856 he was the Administrator General of Communal Affairs.

For several periods from 1857 to 1904, he was a member of the Council of State.

He was the Director General for the Interior and for Justice from 15 July 1859 to 26 September 1860.

He was once again Director General for Communal Affairs from 3 December 1867 to 7 February 1870.

He was the head of government, Minister of State, and Director General for Foreign Affairs, from 20 February 1885 to 22 September 1888.

Thilges died in Luxembourg in 1904.

== See also ==
- Thilges Ministry

== Footnotes ==
Political offices
| Preceded by Baron de Blochausen | Director-General for Justice; 1859–1860 | Succeeded by Paul Eyschen |
| Preceded by Vendelin Jurion | President of the Council of State; 1st time 1872–1874 | Succeeded by Emmanuel Servais |
| Preceded by Baron de Blochausen | Prime Minister of Luxembourg; 1885–1888 | Succeeded by Paul Eyschen |
| Preceded by Baron de Blochausen | Director-General for Foreign Affairs; 1885–1888 | Succeeded by Paul Eyschen |
| Preceded by Henri Vannérus | President of the Council of State; 2nd time 1889–1895 | Succeeded by Henri Vannérus |
