= Emmanuel Servais =

Prime Minister of Luxembourg from 1867-1874

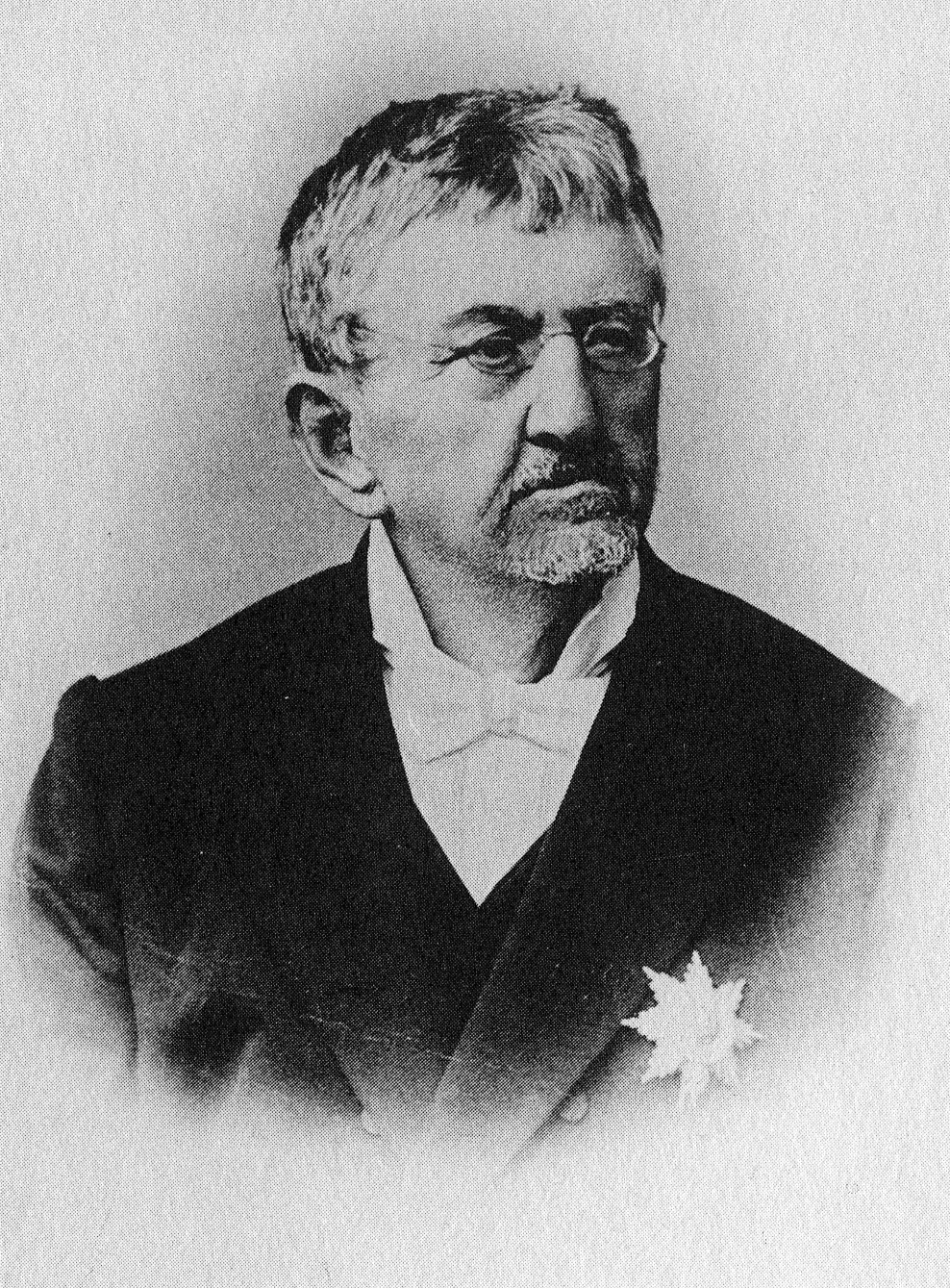

Prime Minister of Luxembourg
- In office 3 December 1867 – 26 December 1874
- Monarch: William III
- Preceded by: Victor de Tornaco
- Succeeded by: Félix de Blochausen

Personal details
- Born: 11 April 1811; Mersch, France
- Died: 17 June 1890 (aged 79); Bad Nauheim, Germany
- Political party: Independent
- Spouse: Justine Elise Boch

Lambert Joseph Emmanuel Servais (French pronunciation: [lɑ̃bɛʁ ʒozɛf emanɥɛl sɛʁvɛ]; 11 April 1811 – 17 June 1890) was a Luxembourgish politician. He held numerous offices of national importance, foremost amongst which was in serving as prime minister of Luxembourg for seven years, from 3 December 1867 until 26 December 1874.

After being Prime Minister, he was a long-serving Mayor of Luxembourg City, holding office from soon after his departure from the premiership, in 1875, until his death, in 1890. Servais was also successively President of the Council of State (1874–1887) and President of the Chamber of Deputies (1887–1890). No other person has held even three of these four positions.

== Education ==
Servais was educated at the Athénée de Luxembourg, where he excelled academically, finishing top of his class in both of his final years at the school. After leaving the Athénée, in 1828, he studied law at the University of Ghent. However, he was forced to leave in after one year, in 1830, by the upheaval caused by the Belgian Revolution. Instead, he left for Paris, graduating in 1831.

== Political career ==
=== Before Partition ===
From 8 September 1836 until the Third Partition, in 1839, Servais represented his home canton of Mersch in Luxembourg's provincial council. In the same year, he established, with Victor Tesch, L'Echo du Luxembourg, which published its first edition on 21 December 1836. Servais used the paper to promote his political interests, particularly improving transport links, an example of which was the construction of a permanent roadway between Ettelbruck and Bastogne.

Servais was amongst a group that, on 5 May 1838, founded the 'Central Patriotic Society of Luxembourg', which opposed the First Treaty of London. The Treaty awarded two-thirds of the grand duchy to Belgium, separating Mersch from Arlon and Bastogne, and hence dividing in two Servais's backyard and the Echo's core constituency. However, Servais' efforts were in vain, as the Treaty was accepted by both the Chamber of Representatives and Senate. Servais remained in the (diminished) grand duchy, being called to the bar in August 1839.

=== Member of State ===
Upon Partition and the dissolution of the United Kingdom of the Netherlands, the constitution was amended to allow for self-government. On 3 August 1841, Servais was named one of nine representatives of Luxembourg that convened in The Hague to advise the King-Grand Duke on its formulation. For his work on doing so, he was awarded the rank of Commander in the Order of the Oak Crown. Under the new arrangement, power passed to the Assembly of State, which held its first session in 1842. Once again, Servais represented Mersch, along with Théodore Pescatore and Claude Clément. In sitting on the Assembly, he was notable for being a relatively extreme and revolutionary liberal.

Servais was prominent in advocating budgetary restraint, and led the (unsuccessful) campaign to reduce the civil list by one-third. His other main issue was education. Primary education was regulated by the state for the first time in 1843, and the scope of the Roman Catholic Church in instruction was anathema to the radical Servais. Similarly, when the issue of secondary education was discussed, Servais argued that the Concordat of 1801 and Organic Articles were annulled by the Belgian Constitution of 1831, and so the Luxembourgish government was under no obligation to the Catholic Church.

== Personal life ==
Servais married his cousin, Anne Justine Elisa Boch (1819–1860) on 16 November 1841. Through the Bochs, and Anne's mother's family (the Richards), Servais was marrying into a political web that also included the Thilges, Pescatore, Northomb, d'Huart, and de Prémorel families.

His son, Émile, would go on to lead a failed communist revolt on 9 January 1919.

== Decorations ==
Servais's honours and decorations included:

- Belgium: Order of Leopold (Grand Cross, 1869)
- France: Legion of Honour (Commander, 1868)
- Luxembourg: Order of the Oak Crown (Grand Cross, 1867)
- Netherlands: Order of the Netherlands Lion (Grand Cross, 1855)
- Prussia: Order of the Red Eagle (Knight 2nd Class with Star, 1865)

== Footnotes ==
Political offices
Preceded by Norbert Metz	Director-General for Finances; 1st time 1853–1857	Succeeded by Guillaume-Mathias Augustin
Preceded by Baron de Tornaco	Prime Minister of Luxembourg; 1867–1874	Succeeded by Baron de Blochausen
Preceded by Baron de Tornaco	Director-General for Foreign Affairs; 1867–1874	Succeeded by Baron de Blochausen
Preceded by Alexandre de Colnet d'Huart	Director-General for Finances; 2nd time 1869	Succeeded by Georges Ulveling
Preceded by Édouard Thilges	President of the Council of State; 1874–1887	Succeeded by Henri Vannérus
Preceded by Charles Simonis	Mayor of Luxembourg City; 1875–1890	Succeeded by Dominique Brasseur
Preceded by Zénon de Muyser	President of the Chamber of Deputies; 1887–1890	Succeeded by Théodore Willibrord de Wacquant
