= Victor de Tornaco =

Prime Minister of Luxembourg from 1860 to 1867

Baron Victor de Tornaco
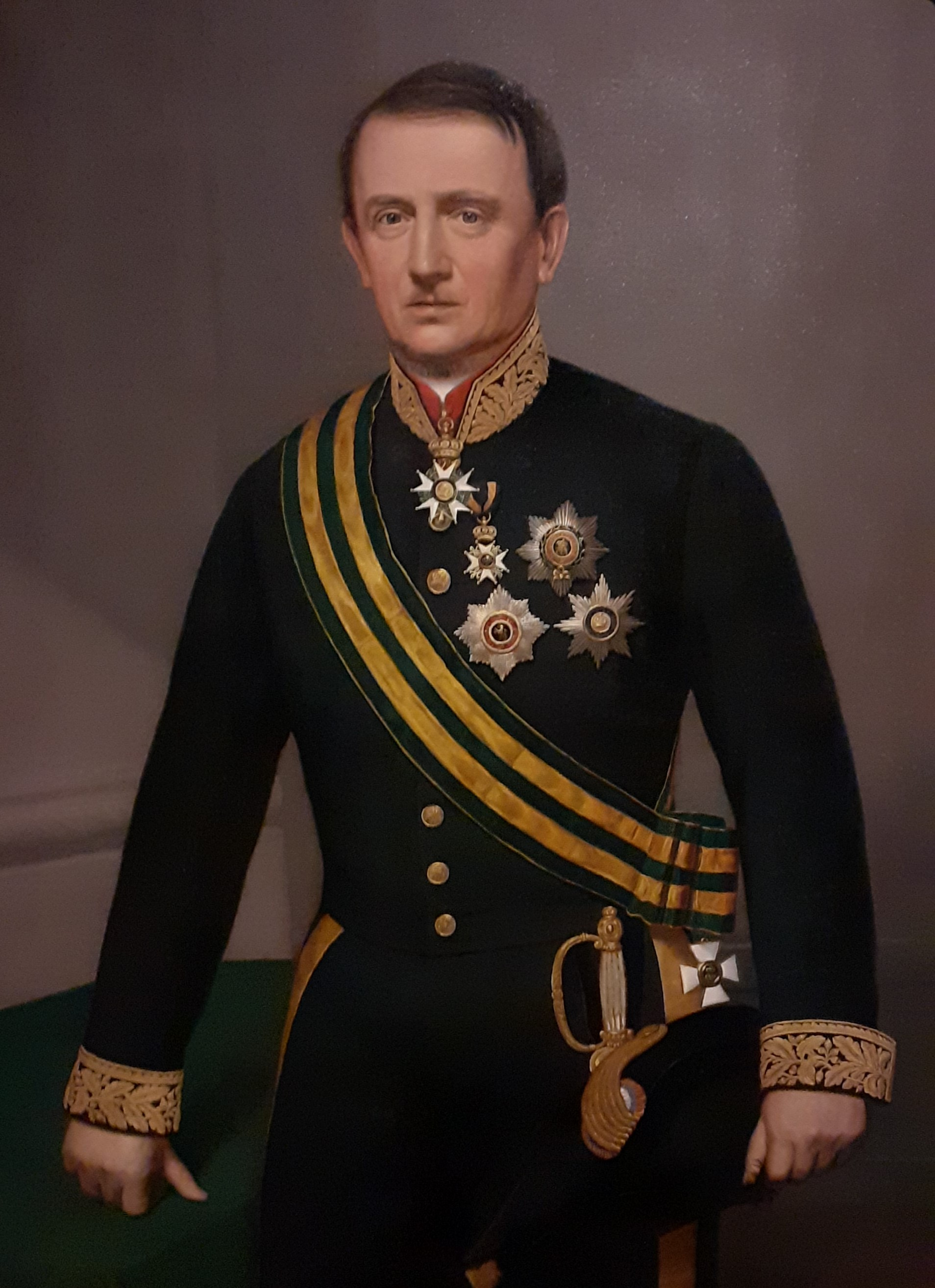

Prime Minister of Luxembourg
- In office 26 September 1860 – 3 December 1867
- Monarch: William III
- Preceded by: Charles-Mathias Simons
- Succeeded by: Emmanuel Servais

Personal details
- Born: 5 July 1805 Arlon, France
- Died: 28 September 1875 (aged 70) Voordt, Belgium
- Party: Independent

Baron Victor de Tornaco (French pronunciation: [viktɔʁ də tɔʁnako]; 5 July 1805 – 28 September 1875) was a Luxembourgish politician. An Orangist, he served as prime minister of Luxembourg for seven years, from 26 September 1860 until 3 December 1867.

== Family ==
His parents were Charles Auguste de Tornaco and Elisabeth de Berlo-Suys (1775–1856).

== Life ==
He studied in Paris at the Ecole polytechnique. In the years after the Belgian Revolution of 1830 he supported William I, King of the Netherlands and Grand-Duke of Luxembourg. From 1841 to 1848 he was a member of the Assembly of Estates.

He was elected to represent the canton of Esch-sur-Alzette on the Constituent Assembly, in 1848. From 1848 to 1856 he was a member of the Chamber of Deputies, and from 1857 to 1860 of the re-established Assembly of Estates.

After the resignation of Charles-Mathias Simons, on 26 September 1860 he was appointed prime minister and Director-General (Minister) for Foreign Affairs and until 1864 also for public transport. On 11 May 1867 he and Emmanuel Servais signed the Second Treaty of London, which had far-reaching consequences for Luxembourg.

On 3 December 1867 the De Tornaco government lost a parliament vote. They had been accused by the opposition of taking a too passive role at the negotiations in London. He was succeeded by Emmanuel Servais. De Tornaco was a member of the Council of State from 3 December 1867 to 20 June 1872.

Victor Tornaco lived in Sanem Castle, which his family owned from 1753 to 1950. He died on 28 September 1875 at the castle of Voordt in the Belgian province of Limburg; he was buried in the family tomb in Sanem.

== Honours ==
before 1866.

- Luxembourg : Minister of State.
- Luxembourg : Knight Grand Cross in the Order of the Oak Crown.
- Belgium : Grand Cordon in the Order of Leopold.
- Kingdom of Prussia : Knight of the Order of the Crown of Prussia.
- Knight in the Order of the Netherlands Lion.
- France : Commander in the Legion of Honour.

== See also ==
- Tornaco Ministry
- De Tornaco family

Political offices
Preceded by Théodore Pescatore	President of the Chamber of Deputies; 1st time 1855–1856	Succeeded by Jean-Mathias Wellenstein
Preceded by Jean-Pierre Toutsch	President of the Chamber of Deputies; 2nd time 1859–1860	Succeeded by Norbert Metz
Preceded by Charles-Mathias Simons	Prime Minister of Luxembourg; 1860–1867	Succeeded by Emmanuel Servais
Preceded by Charles-Mathias Simons	Director-General for Foreign Affairs; 1860–1867	Succeeded by Emmanuel Servais
Preceded by Charles-Mathias Simons	Director-General for Public Works; 1860–1864	Succeeded by Ernest Simons
