= Simons Ministry =

Government of Luxembourg from 1853 to 1860

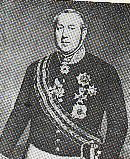
Charles-Mathias Simons, Prime Minister 1853-1860

The Simons Ministry was in office in Luxembourg from 23 September 1853 to 26 September 1860. Initially it just consisted of three members of the government, to which two more were added on 23 September 1854.

It was reshuffled on 24 June 1856, and again on 2 June 1857, when Paul de Scherff was placed in charge of railways, and Guillaume-Mathias Augustin took over his portfolio of Public Works.

On 29 November 1857 there was a third reshuffle, and a fourth on 12 November 1858. From 23 June to 15 July 1859 Mathias Simons and Jean Ulveling were the only members of the government, after which Édouard Thilges was added again.

== Transition ==
The preceding Willmar government seemed to enjoy the favour of the Lieutenant-Governor Prince Henry, who dismissed it only reluctantly. During a conversation at Walferdange Castle, the Prince confided in the minister Édouard Thilges "that he had been very happy with the preceding Willmar-Metz cabinet, and that it was only by order of the king that the cabinet was dismissed and the Simons cabinet had been installed in its place". To signal his disapproval, he waited three weeks before accepting the candidates proposed by Charles-Mathias Simons. The latter had been charged with forming a new government after Wurth-Paquet, president of the Court, had refused this task.

== Composition ==
- Mathias Simons: President of the government council, Administrateur Général for Foreign Affairs
- François-Xavier Wurth: Administrateur général for Justice
- Vendelin Jurion: Administrateur général for the Interior

From 23 September 1854 additionally:

- Emmanuel Servais: Administrateur Général for Finance
- Édouard Thilges: Administrateur Général for Communal Affairs

=== 24 June 1856 to 2 June 1857 ===
- Mathias Simons: President of the government council, Administrateur Général for Foreign Affairs
- François-Xavier Wurth: Administrateur général for the Interior
- Emmanuel Servais: Administrateur Général for Finance
- Charles-Gérard Eyschen: Administrateur Général for Justice
- Paul de Scherff: Administrateur Général for Public Works

=== 2 June to 29 November 1857 ===
- Mathias Simons: President of the government council, Administrateur Général for Foreign Affairs
- François-Xavier Wurth: Administrateur général for the Interior
- Emmanuel Servais: Administrateur Général for Finance
- Charles-Gérard Eyschen: Administrateur Général for Justice
- Paul de Scherff: Administrateur Général for Railways
- Guillaume-Mathias Augustin: Administrateur Général for Public Works

=== 29 November 1857 to 12 November 1858 ===
- Mathias Simons: President of the government council, Director-General for Foreign Affairs
- François-Xavier Wurth: Administrateur général for the Interior
- Guillaume-Mathias Augustin: Director-General for Justice and Finance
- Paul de Scherff: Administrateur Général for Railways

=== 12 November 1858 to 23 June 1859 ===
- Mathias Simons: President of the government council, Director-General for Foreign Affairs
- Guillaume-Mathias Augustin: Director-General for Justice and Finance
- Jean Ulveling: Director-General for the Interior

=== 23 June 1859 to 15 July 1859 ===
- Mathias Simons: President of the government council, Director-General for Foreign Affairs, provisionally also for Justice and Public Works
- Jean Ulveling: Director-General for the Interior, provisionally also for Finance

=== 15 July 1859 to 26 September 1860 ===
- Mathias Simons: President of the government council, Director-General for Foreign Affairs
- Jean Ulveling: Director-General for Finance
- Édouard Thilges: Director-General for the Interior and Justice

== Foreign policy ==
The first task of the Simons government was to re-establish good relations with the governments of the Netherlands and Prussia. The treaty with the German customs union (Zollverein) was renewed shortly before its expiration on 26 December 1853. Charles-Mathias Simons restarted the negotiations on the Grand Duchy's participation in reimbursing the debts of the Kingdom of the Netherlands. In return, the Dutch crown guaranteed diplomatic protection for Luxembourgish subjects abroad.

== Domestic policy ==
The resignation of the Willmar cabinet and its replacement with a reactionary government paved the way for a revision of the liberal Constitution of 1848. The restoration of royal power that the German Confederation imposed on its member states offered a good pretext. Complying with the wishes of William III, the new government was tasked with preparing a text to put an end to parliamentary dominance, and to strengthen the sovereign's powers. In October 1856, the Simons government published its constitutional revision. However, the Chamber of Deputies refused to debate it and passed a vote of no confidence in the government. The King reacted by proclaiming the closure of the parliamentary session and promulgating the revised version of the Constitution. The authoritarian measure of William III resembled a real "coup d'État" intended to restore his power. (see Luxembourg Coup of 1856)

The Constitution of 1856 unequivocally re-established royal sovereignty. "Sovereign power resides in the person of the King-Grand Duke […]." The Chamber of Deputies again assumed its old name of an "Assembly of Estates". It lost its power over the annual budget and taxes, the right to elect its president, the right to meet beyond a brief period when summoned, as well as the right to respond to speeches from the throne with an address. The members of the government were no longer responsible to the parliament. The Constitution of 1856 strongly reinforced executive power, and weakened the national elected representatives. In order to counterbalance the drawbacks of unicameralism, William III created the Council of State, whose members were appointed by the King and which shared legislative power with the Assembly of Estates. The revision of 1856 also subordinated national law to federal law. The members of the Constituent Assembly of 1848, conscious of the danger of being absorbed by the German unification movement, had confined themselves to stating that Luxembourg "is part of the Confederation, in line with existing treaties". The text of 1856 declared that "the Grand Duchy […] is part of the Germanic Confederation and participates in the rights and duties of the federal Constitution". This meant that the restrictive laws on the press and associations in force in Germany were applicable in Luxembourg. For a short while, after the revision of the Constitution, the government worked without the legislature, ruling by decree. It enacted around forty decrees on the press, the electoral system, the pay and status of civil servants, the internal order of the Assembly of Estates, the organisation of the courts, the cadaster, the Chamber of accounts, the communes and the militia.

== Economic policy ==
=== Railway construction ===
The Grand Duchy was under-developed in regards to communications compared with its neighbours. Already in 1850, a law had authorised the Willmar government to negotiate on the construction of railways. However, the Luxembourgish political authorities took five years to find foreign investors. There was doubt as to the profitability of such an enterprise. The question was where the raw materials were whose transportation could have generated enough income to cover the construction of the rails. In the early 1850s, the use of minette ore in steel production was still at an experimental stage. The Simons government managed to complete a contract with French financiers who created the "Société royale grand-ducale des chemins de fer Guillaume-Luxembourg" (Royal Grand-ducal William-Luxembourg Railways Company). This company constructed the network, but did not have the means to operate it. It ceded the operation rights to the Compagnie française des chemins de fer de l’Est. In 1859, the first sections linking Luxembourg to Arlon and Thionville were opened.

The State required considerable funds to provide the country with railway lines. However, the ordinary income of the budget was not sufficient. The public authorities, loyal to the liberal conception of the state's role, were hesitant to go into debt. Nevertheless, in 1856, the Simons government took out an initial loan of 150,000 francs to provide aid to the communes. Three years later, it took out a second loan of 3,500,000 francs to subsidise railway construction.

=== New banking system ===
The mass of capital for the construction of railway lines and the development of industry and trade required the creation of a new system of credit. The Simons government laid the foundations of the modern banking system in the Grand Duchy. Its negotiations with influential German bankers resulted in 1856 in the creation of the Banque Internationale à Luxembourg – both a merchant bank and a bank of issue. The same year saw the birth of the Caisse d’épargne, with the State guaranteeing (two years later) the full reimbursement of funds deposited in it. While this institution hoarded individuals' savings, the Banque internationale provided the country's nascent industry with capital. The attempt to create a property credit institution, the establishment of which had been voted through in 1853, resulted in failure. This establishment, effectively still-born, was intended to offer loans to farmers and land-owners, without them having to give up their land if they fell into debt.
