= List of members of the Constituent Assembly of Luxembourg =

This is a list of members of the Constituent Assembly of Luxembourg. The Constituent Assembly was elected on 19 April 1848 to write a new constitution for Luxembourg.

Name	Canton
Norbert Metz	Capellen
Jean-Baptiste-Henri-Melchior Funck	Capellen
Michel-Maximilien-Joseph Tibesar	Capellen
André Brucher	Capellen
Jean-Guillaume Kremer	Capellen
Henri Scholtus	Capellen
Jean Conzemius	Clervaux
Jean-François Laporte	Clervaux
Bernard Neumann	Clervaux
Lucien Richard	Clervaux
Bernard Pondrom	Clervaux
Jean-Baptiste Pinth	Clervaux
Vendelin Jurion	Diekirch
Pierre Schmit	Diekirch
Adolphe D'Olimart	Diekirch
Jean Berns	Diekirch
Charles-Mathias André	Diekirch
Guillaume Herckmanns	Diekirch
Michel Tibesart	Diekirch
Jean Wampach	Diekirch
Michel Witry	Echternach
Conrad Cigrang	Echternach
Charles Even	Echternach
Hubert Loser	Echternach
Mathias Hardt	Echternach
Mathias Lefort	Echternach
Victor de Tornaco	Esch-sur-Alzette
Henri Motté	Esch-sur-Alzette
François-Xavier Wurth-Paquet	Esch-sur-Alzette
Charles-Philippe Dupaix	Esch-sur-Alzette
Clément Hemmer	Esch-sur-Alzette
Joseph Ritter	Grevenmacher
Jean-Baptiste Knaff	Grevenmacher
Nicolas Wellenstein	Grevenmacher
Jean-Nicolas Klein	Grevenmacher
Auguste Metz	Grevenmacher
Jean-Baptiste Weydert	Grevenmacher
Charles Metz	Luxembourg
Jacques Lamort	Luxembourg
Dominique Stiff	Luxembourg
Théodore Wurth	Luxembourg
Théodore Pescatore	Luxembourg
Jean-Pierre Gerard	Luxembourg
Hubert Dasselborn	Luxembourg
Augustin Schlinck	Luxembourg
Gabriel De Marie	Luxembourg
Mathias Hertert	Luxembourg
François-Charles Collin	Luxembourg
Charles Munchen	Luxembourg
Michel Clément	Mersch
Emmanuel Servais	Mersch
Henri Witry	Mersch
Jean-Pierre Heuardt	Mersch
Jean-Pierre Hoffmann	Mersch
Jean-Pierre Heuardt	Mersch
Jacques-Alexandre Brassel	Redange
Jean-Pierre Scholtus	Redange
Renilde-Guillaume Jacques	Redange
Pierre Neuens	Redange
Dominique Peckels	Redange
Nicolas Sibenaler	Redange
Willibrord Macher	Remich
Mathias Wellenstein	Remich
Jean-Pierre Ledure	Remich
Pierre-Ernest Dams	Remich
Léon de la Fontaine	Remich
Antoine Recht	Remich
Jacques Fuhrmann	Wiltz
Jean-Baptiste Krack	Wiltz
Jean Weyrich	Wiltz
Henri Greisch	Wiltz
Jacques Bernard	Wiltz
Jean Ulveling	Wiltz
