= Revolution of 1848 in Luxembourg =

The Revolution of 1848 in Luxembourg was part of the revolutionary wave which occurred across Europe in 1848. The Grand-Duchy of Luxembourg at that time was in personal union with the Kingdom of the Netherlands.

Dissatisfaction with inequality, the authoritarian government, the lack of civil liberties and a political system that excluded most people from government, caused widespread upheaval. This in turn forced the government to concede various reforms, particularly granting a new constitution, which introduced new civil liberties, parliamentary government, wider participation in the political system, and the separation of powers.

== Background ==
After being annexed by the French in the Napoleonic Wars, Luxembourg was elevated to a Grand Duchy and awarded to the Dutch King by the Congress of Vienna in 1815. While it was supposed to be ruled by him in personal union, separate from his kingdom, the King-Grand Duke William I treated it as a mere province of the Netherlands. (At the time, modern Belgium was part of the Netherlands, and Luxembourg was not geographically separate from Dutch territory.) The Grand Duchy also became part of the German Confederation (the successor to the Holy Roman Empire), and its fortress was garrisoned by Confederation troops.

Luxembourg was profoundly affected by the Belgian Revolution of 1830. (See also: Luxembourg and the Belgian Revolution) Many Luxembourg residents supported the Belgian secessionists, resulting in most of the country being de facto annexed by the new Belgian state. Only the capital, Luxembourg City, remained loyal to the Dutch King, as it was garrisoned by Prussian troops. The situation was only resolved in 1839 through the Treaty of London, when the Dutch King consented to the partition of Luxembourg. The French-speaking parts of Luxembourg were carved off to form part of Belgium, while the remaining German-speaking part made up the rump Grand-Duchy, and would continue to be ruled by the Dutch King-Grand Duke, even though it was now territorially separated from the Netherlands. It would also remain in the German Confederation.

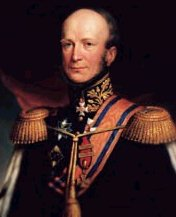
William II, King of the Netherlands and Grand Duke of Luxembourg at the time of the Revolution

In 1841, William II authorised the first constitution of Luxembourg, a document which left all meaningful power in the hands of the sovereign. The legislature provided by the Constitution, the Assembly of Estates, was little more than a shadow parliament. It was elected indirectly, the ballots were not secret, and the vast majority of the population were excluded from political life by a system of census suffrage, requiring the payment of 10 florins per year in tax. At the elections of 1845, in the canton of Luxembourg, only 956 out of 28,477 inhabitants were eligible to vote. The Assembly's sessions were held in private, and its assent was required only for penal and fiscal laws, the civil list, and the extraordinary budget. In 1841, this constitution was generally welcomed, but over the years, voices started to be raised in the Assembly of Estates, demanding a return to the civil liberties which had applied under the Belgian annexation of 1830-1839. Various other issues were a cause for discontent, such as the muzzling of the press, the ban on associations, the exorbitant expenses of the civil list, and lack of judicial and educational reforms.

The 1840s saw several famines, which affected the poor the worst. The authorities did little to deal with the consequences of these crises, at least in the eyes of the people. Furthermore, unpopular taxes caused widespread discontent. Complaints were also raised about the annual payment of 150,000 guilders to the sovereign, which weighed heavily on the state's budget. In the 1840s the government additionally restricted traditional rights of pasture and gathering firewood; the rural poor saw this as an unfair attack on their ancient rights. The 1845 law forbidding straw roofs in houses, introduced after several destructive fires, likewise burdened the poor, who could scarcely afford the required renovations.

On top of all this, unemployment and price increases turned the economic problems into a social crisis. More and more frequently, vagabonds and beggars appeared in whole groups, demanding charity from property owners.

== Events ==
Dissatisfaction had built up over several years, and was only waiting for a trigger. The February revolution of 1848 in Paris set off a revolutionary wave across the continent, which threatened the established monarchic and absolutist order.

A significant aspect of the protest manifested through the submission of petitions to the authorities. Petitions, far from being a recent invention, were an old right. What was unusual was their extent, as 70 petitions were sent to the government around March, which had been more or less spontaneously drafted and signed in over 60 localities.

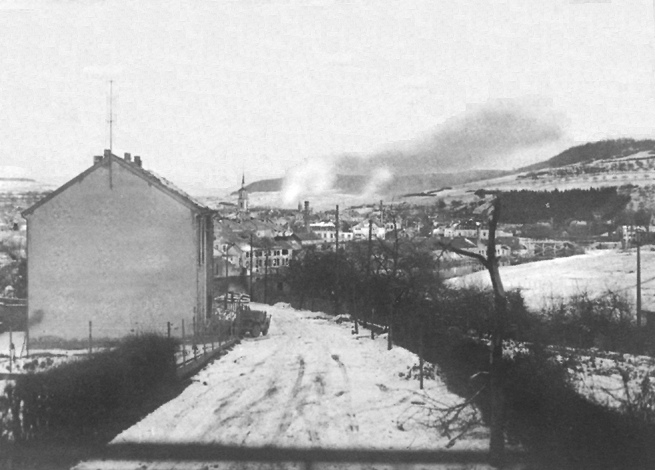
View of Ettelbruck, the centre of the uprising, in 1944

At the same time, a broad protest movement started. The centre of the uprising was Ettelbruck, in the north of the country. On 11 March, several discontented people declared a republic and sang the Marseillaise. The gathered people blocked the way of the gendarmes who appeared on the scene, and tried to provoke them into using their guns. Fearing an extension of the uprising, the government sent further gendarmes to Ettelbruck, as a market was to take place there on 14 March.

On that day, the police tried to arrest several of the ringleaders, which threatened to escalate the situation. An angry crowd gathered outside the gendarmerie station, hurling stones and breaking windows. A gallows was erected outside the house of the local head of the gendarmerie. The people's anger was also felt by other representatives of the authorities: a crowd attacked the house of the local tax collector. In other localities, similar popular disdain for the government was expressed, and its representatives had to deal with various humiliations and insults.

In the capital, a crowd gathered on 16 March. Workers from the suburbs assembled in front of the house of the mayor, Fernand Pescatore, who was suspected of wheat speculation: again, it took the gendarmerie and the Prussian military to prevent any violence.

The unrest spread from Ettelbruck to neighbouring villages, and the government feared it might spread even further. "Revolutionary" flags such as the French, Belgian, black-red-gold (German) and red flags were carried during processions or put up in visible places. These flags were not so much a sign of separatism, as a symbol of solidarity with the revolutionary movements in these other countries.

The Revolution ended about as quickly as it had begun, but lasted the longest in Ettelbruck, where anarchy reigned for about a week. Unrest still flared up in various areas for several weeks, but the government acted decisively to restore order. Gendarmes, forestry and customs officers, and federal German troops, were deployed to the affected areas on 23 March to take down the revolutionary flags and restore order. This unusually large presence of armed forces served as a clear signal to the insurgents, but also to those who were uninvolved. Similarly, on 19 March, a pastoral letter from the Apostolic Vicar of Luxembourg, Jean-Théodore Laurent, was read out in all churches, appealing for calm and reminded the Catholic population of their loyalty to the throne.

On 20 March, the government issued a proclamation announcing changes to the constitution and the abolition of censorship. Acting on government advice, William II had had to agree to reforms. These promises led most citizens and supporters of "law and order" to finally side with the government and distance themselves from any further revolutionary acts. The government also agreed to employ part of the discontented poor on state construction sites, in order to take them off the streets.

=== New constitution ===
The King-Grand Duke established a commission to come up with revisions to the constitution. However, as it was composed by a large number of government officials, the commission provoked widespread hostility and had to be abandoned. William II then called a new Assembly of Estates, with twice the normal number of delegates, with the mission to draft a new constitution. This Constituent Assembly first gathered in Ettelbruck on 25 April 1848. The reason behind meeting in Ettelbruck rather than Luxembourg City may have been the presence of the Prussian garrison in the capital, which was seen as hostile. The Assembly finished its work in record time, proceeding to the final vote confirming the new Constitution on 23 June. The Grand Duke swore an oath on the new Constitution on 10 July, and it came into force on 1 August.

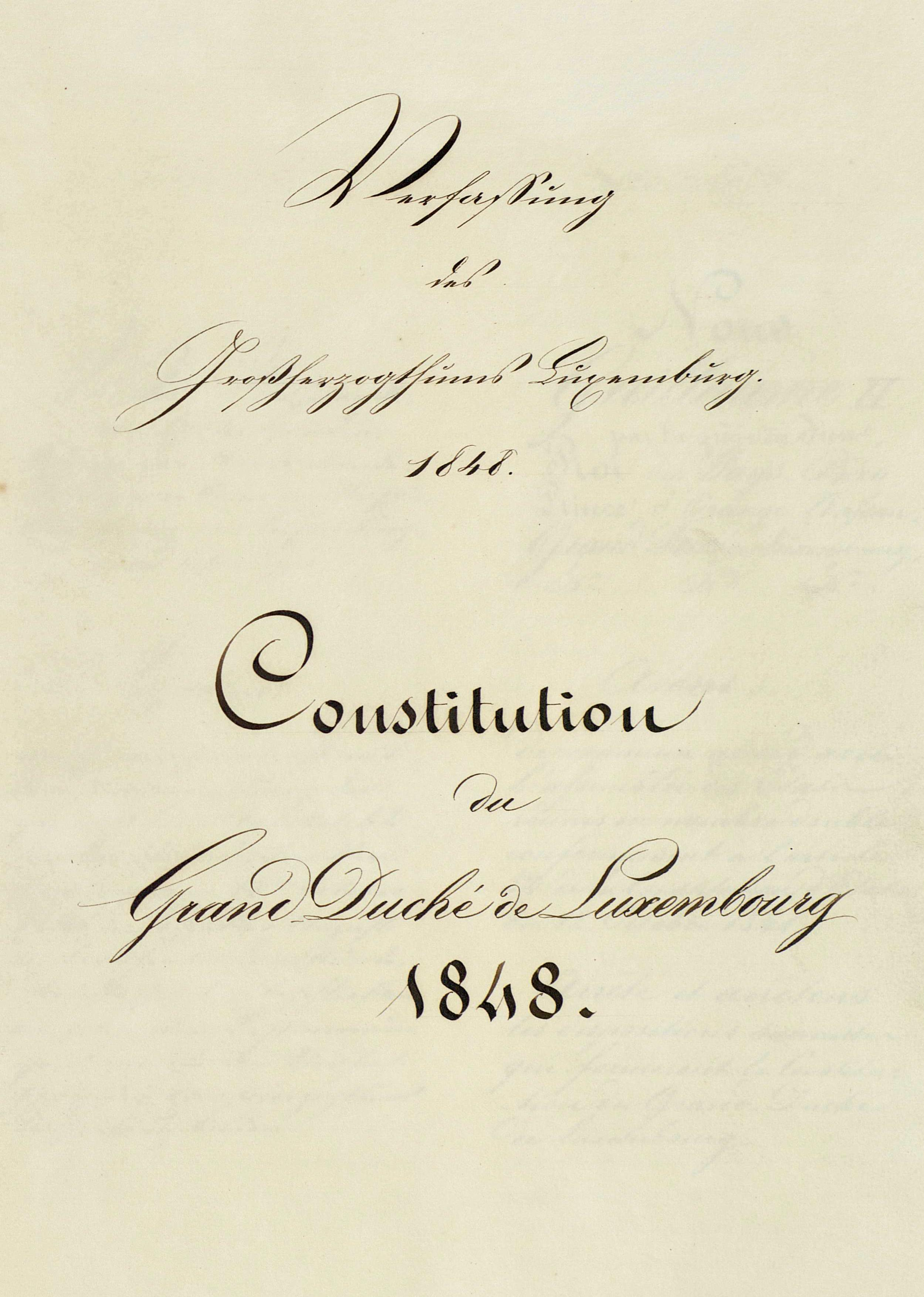
Cover page of the 1848 Constitution

Within a few months, the Constituent Assembly had drafted a relatively liberal constitution, turning Luxembourg into a constitutional monarchy. Heavily influenced by the Belgian constitution of 1830, with several articles copied verbatim, it bore the imprint of the Belgian revolutionary period of 1830-1839. It incorporated key principles of a state governed by the rule of law, such as separation of powers, limiting the sovereign's powers to the executive sphere, the parliament's legislative sovereignty, an annual vote on the ordinary budget, and judicial independence.

Despite its striking resemblance to the Belgian constitution, there were notable differences. Unlike Belgium, Luxembourg's constitution provided for only one chamber of parliament, this being mainly due to the small size of the country and a lack of enough qualified people to sit in two chambers, rather than any ideological reasons. Compared with the 40 francs of annual taxation required to vote in Belgium, Luxembourg required only 10 francs (which still, however, excluded most of the population).

== Legacy ==
=== Change ===
The political shifts triggered by the events of 1848 appear evident: the country's first modern constitution, the introduction of parliamentary government and civil liberties, and the creation of several new government institutions. The monarch's authority was severely curtailed. However, whether the Revolution brought about social change and to what extent remains a subject of debate. Political life in the early 19th century had been dominated by a bourgeoisie composed of high-ranking civil servants who valued order and authority. In 1848, they had to make way for a bourgeoisie composed of businessmen, more liberally inclined, who retained control until the introduction of mass politics in 1919. The Revolution therefore saw power pass from one clique of conservative Orangist officials to another, only slightly larger, clique of liberal businessmen enriched by early industrialisation. It is doubtful, then, whether 1848 was a revolution in the social sense.

1848 did, however, see the working classes take to the streets in anger for the first time. The socialist lawyer, Charles Théodore André, published an appeal to the workers of Luxembourg during the Revolution.

=== Continuity ===
Most of those who had administered the country since 1841 managed to weather the storm of 1848 and remain in their posts after the new Constitution came into force on 1 August. The Constituent Assembly itself was presided over by the governor, Théodore de la Fontaine, who was also re-appointed as head of the post-Revolution government, as were 3 out of the 4 other members of the previous government (Vendelin Jurion, Charles-Mathias Simons and Jean Ulveling). Only one resigned, Théodore Pescatore, who was replaced by Jean-Pierre André. The government underwent nominal changes, with the former governor becoming the "president of the council", and its members receiving the title of "administrator general".

The lines between the various political families were fluid. Conservative and progressive bourgeoisies belonged to the same social milieu: they were members of the same clubs and associations, and would meet in Masonic lodges. Intermarriage further linked the various bourgeoisie families. The rest of the country — farmers, artisans, and workers — remained as excluded from political life as they had been before 1848: the Revolution changed little for them.

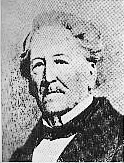
Théodore de la Fontaine, governor of Luxembourg until 1848, then the first prime minister

Several achievements of the Revolution, including the Constitution itself, proved to be short-lived. William II's death in 1849 brought his more reactionary son, William III, to the throne, who described the Constitution of 1848 as "the work of agitated times and sinister apprehensions". After the dissolution of the Frankfurt Parliament, the federal diet of the German Confederation in 1851 enjoined the individual states to ensure their constitutions accorded with the principle of the sovereign power of rulers. In Luxembourg, the new Constitution came under attack from various quarters, particularly the government. A bill to reform the constitution in 1856 ended up being rejected by the Chamber of Deputies, which also passed a motion condemning the government. The King used this as a pretext to dissolve the Chamber, declare the Constitution invalid and to dictate a new, authoritarian constitution, in a series of events known as the Luxembourg Coup of 1856.

== Historiography ==
The 1848 revolution in Luxembourg has long received minimal attention from academic historiography and school curricula. Works inspired by Orangist historiography sought to downplay the events of 1848 as much as possible. For instance, Arthur Herchen's history textbook from 1918 was still in use in secondary schools up to the 1970s in a revised edition. It portrayed the world before 1848 as a carefree one. While admitting that there was a "certain nervousness" in the country in 1848, it goes on to claim that the Luxembourgish people were able to obtain in a peaceful manner the rights and freedoms which elsewhere were won with bloodshed, and that this was due to the great wisdom and generous initiative of the Grand-Duke.

Orangist historiography primarily aimed at legitimizing the Orange-Nassau dynasty, interpreting Luxembourgish history through a dynastic lens to connect the reigning family to the country's founding myth. This dynastic world view ignored the wider population as an agent of history, or any mention of social or popular history: the people only appeared in narratives when they endangered the dynastic order through revolt. This brings out Orangist historiography's other characteristic: its anti-revolutionary nature. It therefore always denied that there was a revolution in Luxembourg in 1848.

This changed in 1957 when Albert Calmes published the 5th volume of the Histoire Contemporaine du Grand-Duché de Luxembourg, with the unambiguous title La Révolution de 1848 au Luxembourg. Calmes had no qualms in describing the events of 1848 as a revolution, as there was a sudden and profound social and political change. He noted that the views of traditional historiography on 1848 belonged more to the realm of myth or of a softening presentation of the facts, as it only reproduced the official statements of those in power, in an attempt to justify the policy of the King-Grand Duke and his Orangist supporters. Calmes' work was troubling to many historians at the time: his vast publication, founded on work in the archives of the Hague and of the Luxembourgish government, undermined traditional historiography, and he criticised the works of neo-Orangists such as Prosper Mullendorff, Jules Mersch, Auguste Collart, and Paul Weber, while attacking what he saw as the "Orangist legend". This may explain why his book was mostly ignored by the press and review journals such as Hémecht and Cahiers Luxembourgeois; likewise, the historians Nicolas Margue and Joseph Meyers did not take account of Calmes' ground-breaking work in their 1969 revised edition of Herchen's textbook.

== See also ==
- Constituent Assembly of Luxembourg
