= Administrator general =

Administrator general or administrator-general is an administrative and governmental title and may refer to:

- Administrateur général, position equivalent to that of "minister" in several ministries of Luxembourg:
  - Fontaine Ministry (1848)
  - Willmar Ministry (1848–1853)
  - Simons Ministry (1853–1860
- Administrator-general was the title of the colonial governors in a number of colonies:
  - List of colonial governors of South West Africa
  - List of colonial governors of the Congo Free State and Belgian Congo
- Administrator general in the Ministry of Justice of Israel
- Administrator general in the Ministry of Justice and Constitutional Affairs of Malawi

== See also ==
- Governor-general
- General Services Administration
