= Der Volksfreund (1848) =

Luxembourgish newspaper

Der Volksfreund (German pronunciation: [deːɐ̯ ˈfɔlksfʁɔʏnt], Luxembourgish: [dɐ ˈfolksfʀoɪnt]; German: "friend of the people") was a Luxembourgish newspaper appearing 2-3 times a week from 1848 to 1849. Founded during the politically turbulent period after the 1848 Revolution and the granting of a new constitution, it had strong personal ties to members of the Fontaine government and followed a pro-government line, attacking the opposition.

== Overview ==
During the period of the 1848 Revolution, and after the granting of press freedoms on 30 March 1848, the government complained in a letter to the chancellor of state in The Hague, Baron de Blochausen, that it faced a highly hostile press. It did not want to create an official government newspaper, but preferred to encourage "good" coverage. A week later, on 7 April 1848, a new newspaper appeared, the Volksfreund, whose slogan was "liberty, legality, public order", (German: "Freiheit, Gesetzlichkeit, öffentliche Ordnung"), likely a play on the French Revolutionary slogan "liberty, equality, fraternity". During the parliamentary session of 28 July 1848, the governor De la Fontaine had to admit that several members of the government were shareholders of the newspaper and various civil servants were editors.

In the spirit of the 1848 revolution, the newspaper described itself as patriotic, and defended democratic demands for the future direction of the country's politics. The workers' advocate Charles Théodore André was one of the newspaper's shareholders, but later distanced himself from it.

The Volksfreund primarily fought against the most influential politicians of the liberal opposition, such as the Metz brothers and their newspaper, the Courrier, as well as another opposition newspaper, the Catholic Luxemburger Wort. After one of the first patriotic songs, Onst Lidchen from 9 May 1848, it made literary history with its edition of 5 November 1848, when it published the satirical poem D’Vulleparlament am Gréngewald ("The parliament of birds in the Grünewald"), written by the writer Edmond de la Fontaine (nicknamed "Dicks)", the son of the head of government Gaspard-Théodore-Ignace de la Fontaine, on the subject of the new, more democratic Chamber of Deputies. Nik Welter also attributes a long prose text in Luxembourgish from 16 May 1848, "Un den „Écho“ vun Arel" ("To the Écho of Arlon"), to Dicks.

On 1 August 1848, the Grenzbote newspaper, based in Echternach, merged with the Volksfreund. This was the same day that the democratic constitution in Luxembourg came into effect, and the same day that stamp duty was abolished.

The founders of the Volksfreund were the Trier rabbi Samuel Hirsch (1815-1889), the teacher Nicolas Martha (1820-1898), the Trier wine merchant Joseph Seelhof (1824-?), the civil servant Pierre-Antoine Schou and Mathieu-Lambert Schrobilgen, a court clerk and the former editor of the Journal de la Ville et du Grand- Duché de Luxembourg. The publisher J. Ph. Bück and later, from the third edition, Seelhof and the printer Schömann were cited repeatedly as the responsible editors, however the real editor seems to have been Samuel Hirsch. Its successor, Der Patriot, mentioned on 10 August 1850 as editor in chief of the Volksfreund the lawyer and later Deputy and Mayor of Luxembourg, Charles Simonis (1818-1875).

At first, the Volksfreund was printed by Lamort, then by Schömann, who had moved his printing business from Echternach to Luxembourg, which had earned him the right to print the Grenzbote. The Volksfreund appeared twice per week, on Tuesdays and Fridays. After the merger with the Grenzbote and the abolition of stamp duty, from July 1848 it appeared three times per week. At this point, it had 300 subscribers. The subscription price was 5 francs per trimester in the capital, and 5,50 francs elsewhere.

In autumn 1848, the Volksfreund needed new funds in order to continue to publish. On 28 September, the first elections had taken place under the new democratic constitution, and the Fontaine government fell less than two months later. In May 1849, the Volksfreund tried desperately to recover the sums of money owed by its customers. However, on 27 June, the printer Schömann announced that management had informed him that publication would cease. For this reason, from 1 July, he started to publish a new paper, at the same price and on the same days of the week. The Volksfreund's final edition appeared on 29 June 1849.
