= Théodore Eberhard =

Luxembourgish architect and politician

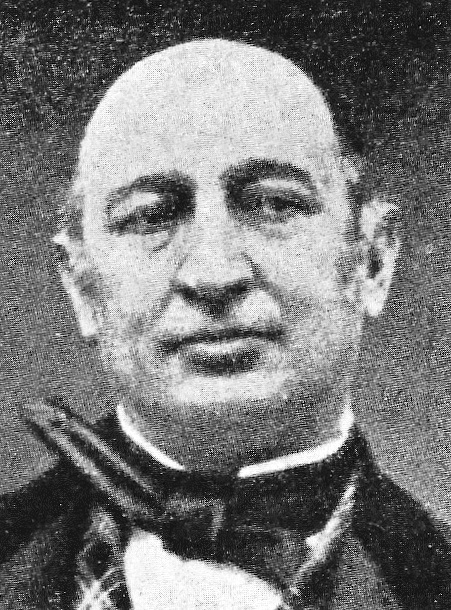

Mayor of Luxembourg City
- In office 1865–1869

Échevin of Luxembourg City
- In office 1859–1865
- In office 1850–1854

Member of the Assembly of Estates
- In office 1857–1866

Member of the Chamber of Deputies
- In office 1851–1854

Personal details
- Occupation: architect

Théodore Eberhard (29 August 1812 – 12 May 1874) was a Luxembourgish architect and politician.

== Biography ==
Eberhard was born in Luxembourg City.

He was a member of the Chamber of Deputies from 1851 to 1854 and of the Assembly of Estates from 1857 to 1866. He served as an échevin of Luxembourg City from 1850 to 1854 and from 1859 to 1865, then as mayor of the city between 1865 and 1869.

Eberhard died in Luxembourg City on 12 May 1874 at the age of 61.

A street in the Belair district of Luxembourg City is named after him.

== Architectural works ==
- Saint Michel Church, Mersch
- Nospelt Church
- Bivange Church
