= Paul de Scherff =

Luxembourgish politician (1820–1894)

Paul de Scherff (14 July 1820 – 22 July 1894) was a Luxembourgish politician.

De Scherff was born in Frankfurt to F. H. W. von Scherff-Arnoldi, who was minister plenipotentiary of the King-Grand Duke to the German Federal Diet. After studying law, Paul de Scherff came to Luxembourg. For six years he was avocat géneral, and later became president of the superior court, at the age of 34. From 24 June 1856 to 11 November 1858 he was Administrateur général (Minister) for Public Works and Railways in the Simons Ministry. From 1869 to 1871, and then again from 1886 to 1892 he was a member of the Chamber of Deputies for the centre, and was President of the Chamber of Deputies from 1869 until 1872.

When the walls of the fortress of Luxembourg were demolished in the 1870s and 1880s, Paul de Scherff was working in the ministry of public works, where he dealt with the building of the municipal parks.

He married Marie Pescatore on 14 September 1842, daughter of Constantin Jos. Antoine Pescatore and niece of Theodore Pescatore. De Scherff was a practising member of the Reformed Church.

== Footnotes ==
Political offices
Preceded by Mathias Wellenstein	Administrator-General for Public Works; 1856–1857	Succeeded by Guillaume-Mathias Augustin
Preceded by Jean-Pierre Toutsch	President of the Chamber of Deputies; 1869–1872	Succeeded by Félix de Blochausen
