= 1854 Luxembourg general election =

General elections were held in Luxembourg on 14 June 1854, electing members of the Chamber of Deputies from all the cantons of Luxembourg.

== Background ==
The elections were held in the entire country. Partial general elections had already been due to happen in 1854; under the electoral system at the time, Deputies were elected to six-year terms, with elections held every three years, renewing half the Chamber's membership at a time. The last partial general election was in 1851.

On 15 May 1854 however, the Simons government prematurely dissolved the Chamber, and organised elections to renew its entire membership for 14 June. This dissolution was due to conflict between the executive and the legislature.

== Results ==
Successful candidates are marked in bold

Canton	Seats	Candidate	First round	Second round
Canton	Seats	Candidate	Votes	Votes
Luxembourg		**Eugène Fischer (Note: Elected after the first round)**	1105	
Luxembourg		**Théodore Pescatore**	1088	
Luxembourg		**Dominique Stiff**	1013	
Luxembourg		**Augustin Lampach**	971	
Luxembourg		**Michel Jonas**	940	
Luxembourg		**Norbert Metz**	835	
Luxembourg		**Édouard Aschmann**	779	
Luxembourg		**Auguste Fischer**	745	
Luxembourg		**Mathias Hertert**	686	
Luxembourg		**Valentin Wahl**	676	
Luxembourg		**Turnout**	1200	
Diekirch		**Joseph Tschiederer**		
Diekirch		**Jean Juttel**		
Diekirch		**Chrétien Mersch**		
Diekirch		**Charles Faber**		
Diekirch		**Jean Angelsberg**		
Diekirch		Ulrich		
Diekirch		**Turnout**		-
Echternach		**Michel Witry**		
Echternach		**Jean-Pierre Föhr**		
Echternach		**Nicolas Arendt**		
Echternach		**Mathias Hardt**		
Echternach		**Turnout**	-	
Grevenmacher		**Antoine Pescatore**		
Grevenmacher		**Mathias Wawer**		
Grevenmacher		**Jean-Pierre Klein**		
Grevenmacher		**Pierre Müller-Walse**		
Grevenmacher		**Joseph Ritter**		
Grevenmacher		Auguste Metz		
Grevenmacher		Schorn		
Grevenmacher		Knaff		
Grevenmacher		**Turnout**		
Remich		**Gustave Lessel**		
Remich		**Willibrord Macher**		
Remich		**Joseph-Chrétien Gretsch**		
Remich		**Jacques Diederich**		
Remich		**Turnout**		
Wiltz		**Charles Mathieu**		
Wiltz		**Jacques Bernard**		
Wiltz		**Michel Frères**		
Wiltz		**Édouard Thilges**		
Wiltz		**Michel Fallis**		
Wiltz		**Turnout**		
Clervaux		**Jean-Pierre Toutsch**		
Clervaux		**Lucien Richard**		
Clervaux		**Bernard Neumann**		
Clervaux		**Charles-Gérard Eyschen**		
Clervaux		**Turnout**		
Esch-sur-Alzette		**Victor de Tornaco**		
Esch-sur-Alzette		**Auguste Collart**		
Esch-sur-Alzette		**Théodore De Wacquant**		
Esch-sur-Alzette		**Nicolas Schmit**		
Esch-sur-Alzette		**Jean Steichen**		
Esch-sur-Alzette		Graas		
Esch-sur-Alzette		Hemmer		
Esch-sur-Alzette		**Turnout**		
Mersch		**Michel Clément**		
Mersch		**Henri Witry**		
Mersch		**Jean-Pierre Hoffmann**		
Mersch		**Jean-Pierre Heuardt**		
Mersch		**Turnout**		
Redange		**Nicolas Schröder**		
Redange		**Rénilde-Guillaume Jacques**		
Redange		**Charles Bassing**		
Redange		**Nicolas Hippert**		
Redange		**Turnout**		
Capellen		**Charles Collart**		
Capellen		**Jean-Baptiste-Henri-Melchior Funck**		
Capellen		**Jean-Guillaume Kremer**		
Capellen		**Dominique Elter** (Note: Elected after the second round)		
Capellen		Thibesart		
Capellen		**Turnout**		
Vianden		**Jean Daleyden**		
Vianden		**Turnout**		

== Analysis ==
In Luxembourg canton, the entire list of candidates supported by the democratic-liberal anti-Simons Courrier du Grand-Duché de Luxembourg was elected with a large majority; in Mersch, 3 of the 4 successful candidates were on the Courrier's list.

Notwithstanding the results in these two cantons, the elections were generally seen as a win for the pro-Simons government, reactionary side, over those supporting the 1848 Constitution and democratic rights; the Courrier stated "in several cantons, the reactionary candidates prevailed over the constitutional candidates and the old majority is seriously affected." The Chamber could now be expected to support the government.
