= Fontaine Ministry =

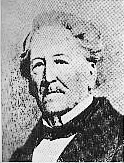
Gaspard-Théodore-Ignace de la Fontaine, Prime Minister in 1848

The Fontaine Ministry formed the government of Luxembourg from 1 August 1848 to 2 December 1848. It was headed by Gaspard-Théodore-Ignace de la Fontaine.

== Background ==
After the Constitution came into force on 1 August 1848, the first elections to the Chamber of Deputies were organised on 28 September. This had only become possible after popular unrest had broken out under governor Gaspard-Théodore-Ignace de la Fontaine in March 1848. On 15 March, the government and King-Grand-Duke William II sought conciliation with the people. Censorship was abolished, and a Constituent Assembly was called in Ettelbrück, which was to draft a new constitution. The text of the new constitution, which was modeled on the liberal Belgian constitution, was adopted on 23 June.

After the elections, de la Fontaine, Vendelin Jurion, Charles-Mathias Simons and Jean Ulveling were retained as members of the government; Théodore Pescatore resigned and was replaced with Jean-Pierre André.

The members of the new government received new titles: de la Fontaine was appointed President of the Government Council, and his "ministers" now had the title of "Administrator general".

The new constitution allowed the Chamber to exercise a great deal of control over the government. The government had to account for its actions in the Chamber, the Acts of the King-Grand-Duke were counter-signed by the government (which therefore took responsibility for them) and the Chamber voted on the budget.

== Composition ==
- Gaspard-Théodore-Ignace de la Fontaine: President of the Government Council, Administrator-general for Foreign Affairs, Justice, and Culture
- Vendelin Jurion: Administrator-general for the Interior
- Charles-Mathias Simons: Administrator-general for Communal Affairs
- Jean-Pierre André: Administrator-general ad interim for Public Works, Communes and Military Affairs
- Jean Ulveling: Administrator-general for Finance

== Domestic policy ==
De la Fontaine had only a slim majority in the Chamber. Especially the Liberals mistrusted him. Domestically, two issues predominated in this period: the law on communes (23 October), which established limits on the communes' autonomy and government control, and the naturalisation law (12 November), which caused the government to lose confidence in the Chamber, due to which it had to resign on 2 December 1848.

== Foreign policy ==
The de la Fontaine government tried to bring about a strong integration in the German Confederation, fearing revolutionary influences from France and Belgium. The government, against the wishes of public opinion, took an active part in German politics, and even supported the decision of the Constituent Assembly to send Luxembourgish delegates to the short-lived Diet of Frankfurt, where they debated over German unity.
