= Willmar Ministry =

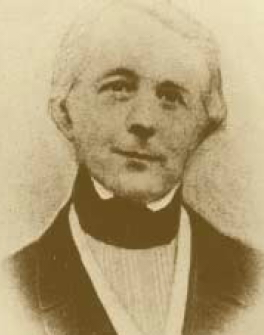
Jean-Jacques Willmar, Prime Minister 1848-1853

The Willmar Ministry was in office in Luxembourg from 2 December 1848 to 23 September 1853.

== Transition ==
The Constitution that resulted from the Revolution of 1848 came into force on 1 August 1848. On 28 September the first elections to the Chamber of Deputies took place.

From the first meeting of the parliament, the Fontaine government faced opposition from the liberals who described him as a "turncoat". When Gaspard-Théodore-Ignace de la Fontaine received only a feeble majority in a confidence vote in the Chamber, he decided to resign. Jean-Jacques Madelaine Willmar, the son of the former governor of Luxembourg in the time of the United Kingdom of the Netherlands, was asked to form a new government. Apart from the conservatives Mathias Ulrich and Jean Ulveling, the new prime minister appealed to Norbert Metz, the leader of the radical liberals, who was given the ministries of Finances and the Armed Forces.

== Composition ==
- Jean-Jacques Willmar: President of the Government Council, Administrateur Général for Foreign Affairs, Justice and Culture, provisionally also for Public Education
- Mathias Ulrich: Administrateur général for the Interior, provisionally for Public Works and Communes
- Norbert Metz: Administrateur général for Finance, provisionally for the Armed Forces
- Jean Ulveling: Administrateur général for Communal Affairs

== Foreign policy ==
Norbert Metz, who was pro-Belgian and hostile to the German Confederation, made his mark on the Willmar government's foreign policy. The turf war between the Administrator General for Finances and the director of German customs in Luxembourg irritated the Prussian authorities to the extent that they threatened to not renew the customs union agreement, which was due to expire in 1854. Moreover, the government shied away from the demands of the German Confederation by refusing to send a Luxembourgish contingent against Schleswig, and compromised relations with its partner in personal union by dragging out the negotiations on Luxembourgish participation in the reimbursement of the debt of the Kingdom of the Netherlands.

== Domestic policy ==
After the death of William II on 17 March 1849, relations between the government and the Crown deteriorated. An authoritarian person, William III wished to return to the autocratic regime of before 1848 and soon clashed with Willmar's coalition government. On 5 February 1850, he named his brother, Prince Henry, Lieutenant-Governor of the Grand Duchy. Whether he liked it or not, Prince Henri was forced to apply the reactionary policy of William III.

The Willmar government took important measures with regards to currency. The law of 20 December 1848 imposed the franc as the accounting unit of public administration. The budget and public documents were henceforth denominated in francs and centimes, not in florins. However, without a real Luxembourgish currency, people continued to use foreign coins, usually thalers. In 1851, the government launched a crucial debate in the Chamber on the question of producing a national currency. On 9 January 1852 a law was promulgated which ordered the production of copper money for the Grand Duchy. The first Luxembourgish currency was put in circulation in 1854.
