= 1848 Luxembourg general election =

General elections were held in Luxembourg on 28 September 1848. They were the first direct elections to the Chamber of Deputies. Doctrinaire Liberals, who had been in power since 1841, lost the election to progressive Liberals and Catholics who were supportive of the new constitution.

== Electoral system ==
The elections were the first held after a new electoral law was passed on 23 July 1848, which established direct and secret elections. It also reduced the tax qualification from 10 florins to 10 francs. Although this doubled the number of voters from around 5,000 to 9,868, 95% of the population remained disenfranchised. They were also the first elections held under the 1848 constitution, which was based on the Belgian constitution and introduced a parliamentary system with a constitutional monarchy, limiting the powers of the Grand Duke.

== Aftermath ==
Although the progressive Liberals and Catholics held a majority of seats, the accession of William III to the throne in 1849 reduced their power. William opposed the 1848 constitution, supported the doctrinaire Liberals and demanded that the full power of the monarchy be restored.

== Results ==
Successful candidates in bold.

Canton	Seats	Candidate	First round	Second round
Canton	Seats	Candidate	Votes	Votes
Diekirch	5	**Jean Juttel**	328	422
Diekirch	5	**Joseph Tschiderer**	307	450
Diekirch	5	Behrens	301	
Diekirch	5	**Frédéric-Georges-Prosper de Blochausen**	294	349
Diekirch	5	**Chrétien Mersch**	284	369
Diekirch	5	**Mathias Ulrich**	258	331
Diekirch	5	Neuman	208	
Diekirch	5	Mongenast	199	
Diekirch	5	Salentiny	191	
Diekirch	5	Charles-Mathias André	185	
Diekirch	5	**Turnout**	773	
Clervaux	4	**Lucien Richard**		
Clervaux	4	**Bernard Pondrom**		
Clervaux	4	**Jean-Pierre Toutsch**		
Clervaux	4	**Édouard Thilges**		
Clervaux	4	**Turnout**		
Wiltz	4	**Jean-Baptiste Krack**		
Wiltz	4	**Henri Greisch**		
Wiltz	4	**Jean-Charles Mathieu**		
Wiltz	4	**Jean-Pierre Dictus**		
Wiltz	4	**Turnout**		
Redange	4	**Jacques-Alexandre Brassel**		
Redange	4	**Dominique Peckels**		
Redange	4	**Renilde-Guillaume Jacques**		
Redange	4	**Nicolas Schröder**		
Redange	4	**Turnout**		
Echternach	4	**Mathias Lefort**		
Echternach	4	**Mathias Hardt**		
Echternach	4	**Charles-Gérard Eyschen**		
Echternach	4	**Michel Jonas**		
Echternach	4	**Turnout**		
Luxembourg	9	**Théodore Pescatore** (Note: Elected at the first round with an absolute majority)		
Luxembourg	9	**Charles Metz**		
Luxembourg	9	**Eugène Fischer**		
Luxembourg	9	**Dominique Stifft**		
Luxembourg	9	**Augustin Schlinck** (Note: Elected at a run-off vote in the second round)		
Luxembourg	9	**Hubert Dasselborn**		
Luxembourg	9	**Augustin Lampach**		
Luxembourg	9	**Mathias Hertert**		
Luxembourg	9	**David Heldenstein**		
Luxembourg	9	Jonas		
Luxembourg	9	Fendius		
Luxembourg	9	Jacques Adam		
Luxembourg	9	Ph. Würth		
Luxembourg	9	Gengler		
Luxembourg	9	**Turnout**		
Remich	4	**Guillaume Velter**		
Remich	4	**Pierre-Ernest Dams**		
Remich	4	**Charles-Théodore André**		
Remich	4	**Nicolas Spanier**		
Remich	4	**Turnout**		
Esch-sur-Alzette	5	**François-Louis-Guillaume Gras**		
Esch-sur-Alzette	5	**Victor de Tornaco**		
Esch-sur-Alzette	5	**Auguste Collart**		
Esch-sur-Alzette	5	**Clément Hemmer**		
Esch-sur-Alzette	5	**François Müller**		
Esch-sur-Alzette	5	**Turnout**		
Grevenmacher	4	**Joseph Ritter**		
Grevenmacher	4	**Auguste Metz**		
Grevenmacher	4	**Antoine Putz**		
Grevenmacher	4	**Joseph Heynen**		
Grevenmacher	4	**Turnout**		
Mersch	4	**Michel Clément**		
Mersch	4	**Jean-Pierre Hoffmann**		
Mersch	4	**Henri Witry**		
Mersch	4	**Jean-Pierre Heuardt**		
Mersch	4	**Turnout**		
Capellen	4	**Norbert Metz**		
Capellen	4	**J.-B.-Henri-Melchior Funck**		
Capellen	4	**André Brücher**		
Capellen	4	**Michel-Maximilien-Jos. Tibesar**		
Capellen	4	**Turnout**		

== See also ==
- Revolution of 1848 in Luxembourg
