= Luxemburger Wort =

Luxembourgish daily newspaper

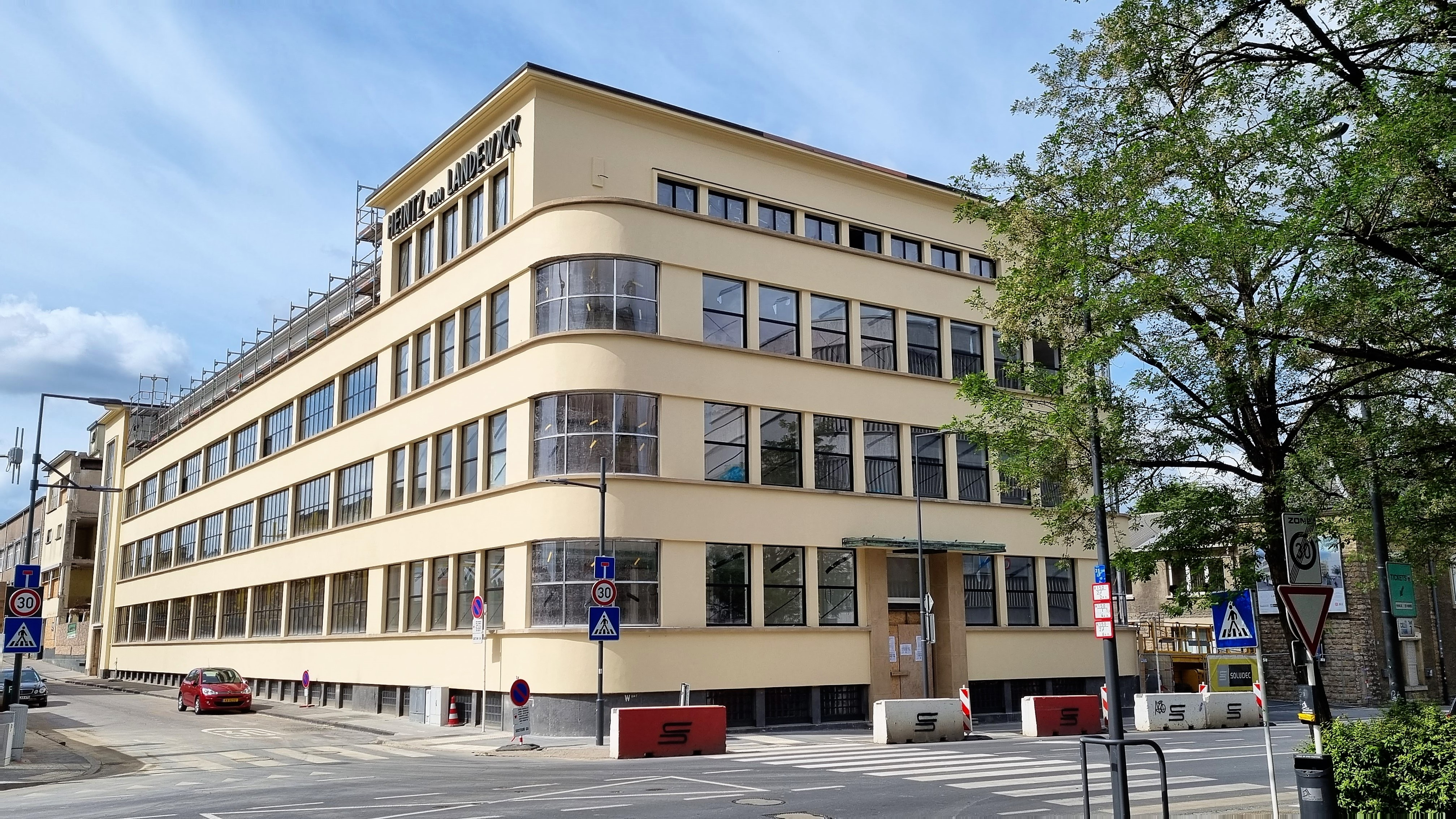
- Luxemburger Wort head office
- Type: Daily newspaper (except Sundays)
- Owner: Mediahuis Luxembourg
- Founded: 23 March 1848
- Political alignment: Catholic
- Language: German
- Headquarters: 2, rue Christophe Plantin, Luxembourg City
- Circulation: 45,000 (2024)
- Website: wort.lu

Luxemburger Wort (German pronunciation: [ˈlʊksm̩ˌbʊʁɡɐ ˈvɔʁt], Luxembourgish: [ˈluksəmˌbuʁɡɐ ˈvoχt]; lit. 'Luxembourgish Speech') is a German-language Luxembourgish daily newspaper. There are online English and French editions named the Luxembourg Times and Virgule respectively. It is owned by Mediahuis Luxembourg.

== History and profile ==
Luxemburger Wort began publication on 23 March 1848. The paper was founded just three days after press censorship was abolished. The newspaper is mainly written in German, but includes small sections in both Luxembourgish and French. For many years from its founding until recently, the paper was part of the Saint-Paul Luxembourg S.A. which was owned by the Archdiocese. The paper has a strong Catholic leaning.

It is not known exactly how the Apostolic Vicar Jean-Théodore Laurent, who had been accused by the government of provoking the 1848 Revolution and had to leave the country six weeks later, brought about the creation of the newspaper.

Nevertheless, Laurent wrote to his brother that they were making use of freedom of the press. In 1948, the bishop Joseph Laurent Philippe described the foundation of the Luxemburger Wort as Laurent's last great act; the director of the seminary Georges Hellinghausen described Laurent's participation as decisive. The new newspaper was an aggressive Catholic opposition newspaper and, in part, combative towards the liberal state. Its creation marked the true birth of political Catholicism in Luxembourg.

From its very foundation, the newspaper opposed the Volksfreund, founded by Samuel Hirsch, and the Judenrabbiner, as well as the subsidy for the Jewish congregation. In the period from 1849 to 1880, on average it published two antisemitic articles per week.

From 1938, the newspaper opposed Nazi Germany. In 1940, after the German invasion of Luxembourg, the Luxemburger Wort was co-opted as part of the occupation. The director Jean Origer and the editors Batty Esch and Pierre Grégoire were arrested by the Nazis and sent to a concentration camp. Pierre Grégoire was the only one of them to survive imprisonment. The 2 March 1942 edition marked the paper's transition to Antiqua typeface, having used Fraktur since its inception.

On 11 September 1944, a day after the liberation of Luxembourg, the paper produced the headline: Letzeburg ass frei! (Note: In modern spelling: Lëtzebuerg ass fräi!) ("Luxembourg is free!"). This was one of few editions to ever appear entirely in Luxembourgish; the publishing house also changed its name from German into French as a symbolic act. While Antiqua was retained as the Wort's typeface, the paper's title went back to being written in Fraktur, as it does to this day.

After André Heiderscheid's replacement as editor-in-chief by Leon Zeches in 1986, the latter sought to 'de-ideologise' the newspaper and to distance it more strongly from the Christian Social People's Party. For example, the paper increasingly started to report on initiatives, debates and congresses of other political parties as well.

From 17 March 2005 to 21 March 2008, the paper called itself d' Wort: Luxemburger Wort für Wahrheit und Recht.

In the period of 1995–1996 Luxemburger Wort had a circulation of 85,000 copies, making it the best-selling paper in the country. The circulation of the paper was 83,739 copies in 2003. In 2006 its circulation was 79,633 copies. The paper had a circulation of almost 70,000 copies a day and a daily readership of more than 180,000 (print and e-paper) in 2007, making it Luxembourg's most popular newspaper by both counts.

== Editors ==
- Edouard Michelis (1848–1854)
- Nicolas Breisdorff (1854–1885)
- Jean-Baptiste Fallize (1884–1887)
- Andreas Welter (1887–1889)
- Jean Origer (1924–1940)
- German occupation 1940–1944
- Jean Bernard (1945–1958)
- Alphonse Turpel (1958–1967)
- André Heiderscheid (1967–1986)
- Léon Zeches (1986–2009)
- Marc Glesener (2010–2012)
- Jean-Lou Siweck (2013–2017)
- Roland Arens (2017-2024)
- Ines Kurschat (since 2025)
