= Théodore Pescatore =

Luxembourgish politician (1802–1878)

Théodore Pescatore (6 February 1802 – 23 August 1878) was a Luxembourgish politician. One of the most important liberals in the mid-19th century, he was president of the Constituent Assembly that wrote Luxembourg's Constitution in 1848. He later held the position of President of the Chamber of Deputies for two years.

Pescatore studied law at the University of Liège, but, instead of pursuing a career in the law, Pescatore attended a military academy in the Netherlands, and, upon returning to Luxembourg, in 1827, he was recruited as a lieutenant into the guard of Luxembourg City. However, after three years, Pescatore's anti-Orangist and pro-Belgian political sympathies forced him out of the military. Instead, he joined with his cousins to set up a faience factory in Eich, where his brother was mayor. After seven years, they merged into the Société d'industrie luxembourgeoise, and Pescatore helped set up Auguste Metz & Cie with Auguste Metz and his brothers Charles and Norbert.

In 1841, he was appointed to the 'Commission of Nine' in the Hague that advised the King-Grand Duke on the Luxembourgish issues, including the drafting of a constitution. From 30 October 1841, he was a member of the Assembly of Estates for Mersch, and entered the Commission of Government under the governor, Gaspard-Théodore-Ignace de la Fontaine. Pescatore was charged with negotiating a treaty on the terms of Luxembourg's membership of the Zollverein, in place of F. H. W. de Scherff, who had fallen ill.

He was elected to the 1848 Constituent Assembly, representing Luxembourg canton. Appointed the first chair of the constituent assembly, he advocated heavy involvement with the Frankfurt Parliament. In the elections to the first Chamber of Deputies after the promulgation of the constitution, Pescatore ran for Luxembourg canton, and found himself in the unique position of being top of the electoral lists of all three parties. Despite having been in government before 1848, he showed no interest in returning afterwards, and remained a legislator, being elected vice-president of the chamber in 1852, with Charles Metz as president. With the death of Metz the following year, Pescatore became the new president of the chamber, whilst the Willmar government was replaced by one under Charles-Mathias Simons.

However, with the death of Auguste Metz in 1855, and the subsequent retirement of Charles Metz, the radicals that formed Pescatore's support base withered, and he was replaced as president of the chamber by Victor de Tornaco. He decided to resign as deputy as well, but returned when re-elected at the head of the liberals' list in Luxembourg canton on 30 November 1857. He returned as president of the Chamber, being elected by 21 votes to 3. He held this position until 1866, when he stood down as president, and he retired as a deputy in 1869.

Pescatore died on 23 August 1878 after a long illness.

== Footnotes ==
Political offices
Preceded by Charles Metz	President of the Chamber of Deputies; 1st time 1853–1855	Succeeded by Baron de Tornaco
Preceded by Norbert Metz	President of the Chamber of Deputies; 2nd time 1860–1866	Succeeded by Michel Witry
