= 1860 Luxembourg general election =

Partial general elections were held in Luxembourg on 30 July 1860, electing 15 members of the Assembly of Estates. The elections took place in Echternach, Esch-sur-Alzette, Grevenmacher, Luxembourg-Campagne, Mersch, Redange, Remich, and Wiltz.

== Background and electoral system ==
At the time, Luxembourg elected legislators to six-year terms; there were elections every three years, at which half the Assembly of Estates (the legislature) was up for election at a time. Different cantons were grouped together for this purpose.

Grevenmacher and Redange cantons were not originally scheduled to hold elections in 1860. The elections held there were by-elections, as the Assembly members Wellenstein and Bassing had resigned their mandates and had to be replaced; the elections in these cantons were also scheduled for 30 July, like the other cantons.

== Results ==
Candidates who were successful are in bold.

Canton	Seats	Candidate	Votes
Echternach	2	Pierre Becker	
Echternach	2	Michel Witry	
Echternach	2	Turnout	
Esch-sur-Alzette	3	Victor de Tornaco	
Esch-sur-Alzette	3	Jean Steichen	
Esch-sur-Alzette	3	Gras	
Esch-sur-Alzette	3	Turnout	
Grevenmacher	1	Ritter	
Grevenmacher	1	Turnout	
Luxembourg-Campagne	3	Eberhardt	
Luxembourg-Campagne	3	Dominique Stiff	
Luxembourg-Campagne	3	Adolphe Fischer	
Luxembourg-Campagne	3	Turnout	
Mersch	2	Henri Witry	
Mersch	2	J.-P. Fischer	
Mersch	2	Turnout	
Redange	1	Gläsener	
Redange	1	Turnout	
Remich	2	Ernest Simons	
Remich	2	Jacques-Guillaume Lessel	
Remich	2	Turnout	
Wiltz	3	Jean-Charles Mathieu	
Wiltz	3	Henri Greisch	
Wiltz	3	Jean-Joseph-Georges Faber-Knepper	
Wiltz	3	Turnout	
