= Charles-Gérard Eyschen =

Luxembourgish politician

Charles-Gérard Eyschen (2 June 1800 – 28 September 1859) was a Luxembourgish politician and jurist. An Orangist, Eyschen served in the cabinet of Charles-Mathias Simons as Director-General for Justice.

Born in Baschleiden in 1800, Eyschen became a lawyer. In 1826, he earned his doctorate in law from the University of Liège, and in 1829, he obtained a doctorate in philosophy, also at Liège. He became a judge on the Court of First Instance in Diekirch, but resigned the following year, when he moved to Luxembourg City. He returned to the judiciary in 1832, becoming judge on the Court of First Instance in Luxembourg City. He became President of the Arrondissement Tribunal in Diekirch in 1840, and transferred to the same (but more prestigious) position in Luxembourg City in 1842. He was appointed to the judiciary's supreme court, the Superior Court of Justice, in 1843.

He failed to be elected to the Constituent Assembly that drafted the grand duchy's first Constitution in 1848. However, he was subsequently elected to the Chamber of Deputies, which the Constitution established and which succeeded the Constituent Assembly, representing Echternach from 1848 to 1854 and Clervaux from 1854. Eyschen became a minister as Director-General for Justice in the administration of Charles-Mathias Simons. He played a crucial role in the so-called 'Coup of 1856', in which the King-Grand Duke greatly expanded his power and established the Council of State. The following year, Eyschen left the ministry, and returned to being a judge.

Eyschen died two years later, after a long illness. He married Marie-Christine Wurth (1804–1846) in 1832, who had five children by Eyschen before her death. Two of these children died in infancy, but one, Paul Eyschen, would be Prime Minister for twenty-seven years. He remarried to Wurth's cousin, Jeanne-Françoise Wurth (1809–1883), in 1850.

== Footnotes ==
Political offices
Preceded by François-Xavier Wurth	Director-General for Justice; 1856–1857	Succeeded by Guillaume-Mathias Augustin
