= Governor-general =

Vice-regal or colonial office

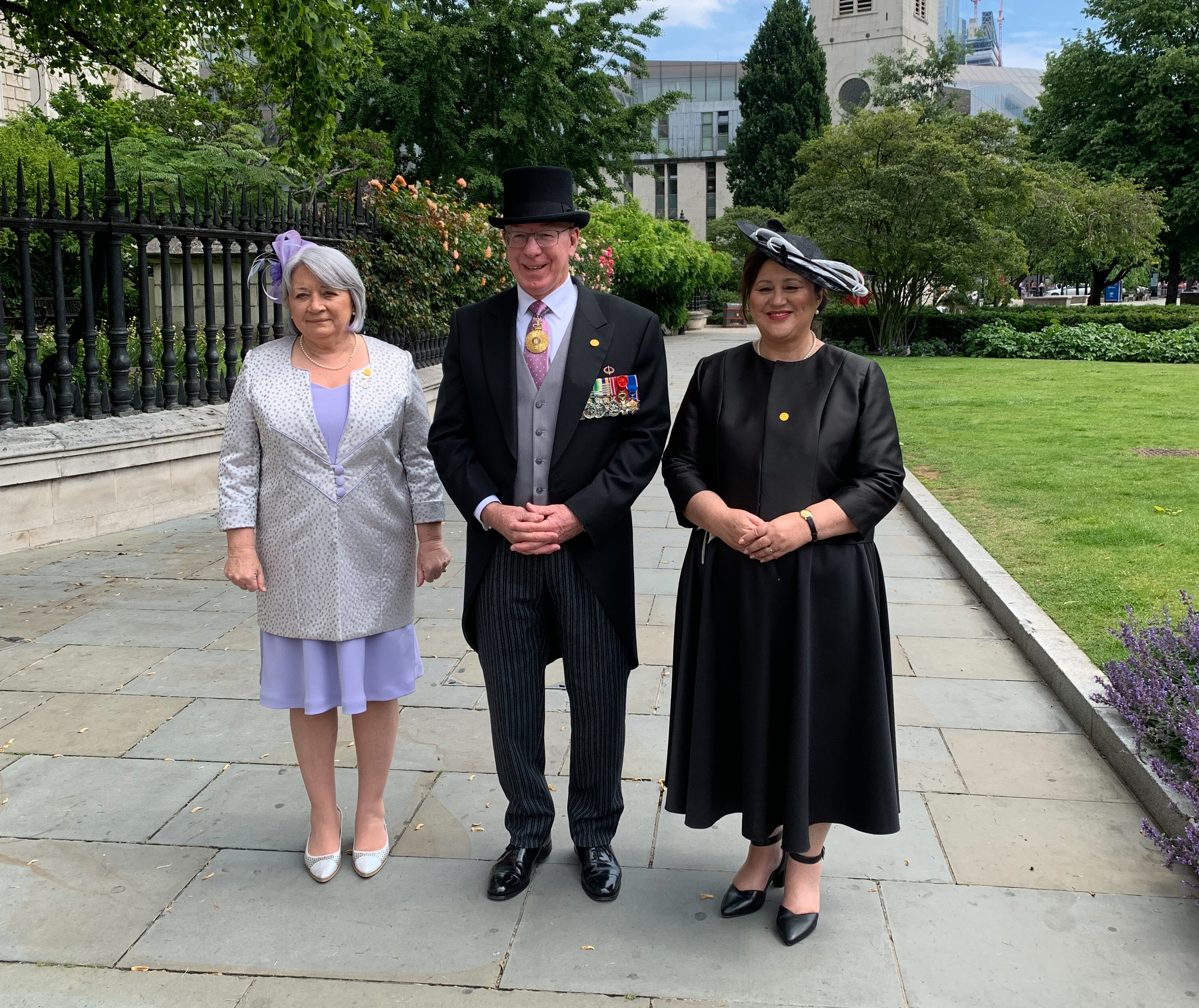
Mary Simon, David Hurley and Dame Cindy Kiro, the governors-general of Canada, Australia and New Zealand respectively, in 2022

Governor-general (plural governors-general), or governor general (Note: In Canada the title "Governor General" is always used unhyphenated. In Australia and New Zealand, the term is always hyphenated.) (plural governors general), is the title of an official, most prominently associated with the British Empire and the Commonwealth. In the context of the governors-general and former British colonies, governors-general continue to be appointed as viceroy to represent the monarch of a personal union in any sovereign state over which the monarch does not normally reign in person (non-UK Commonwealth realm). In the British Empire, governors-general were appointed on the advice of the government of the United Kingdom and were often British aristocracy, but in the mid-twentieth century they began to be appointed on the advice of the independent government of each realm and were citizens of each independent state.

Governors-general have also previously been appointed in respect of major colonial states or other territories held by either a monarchy or republic, such as Japan, Korea, Taiwan and France in Indochina.

== Current uses ==
In modern usage, in the context of governors-general and former British colonies, the term governor-general originated in those British colonies that became self-governing within the British Empire. Before World War I, the title was used only in federated colonies in which its constituents had had governors prior to federating, namely Canada, Australia, and the Union of South Africa. In these cases, the Crown's representative in the federated Dominion was given the superior title of governor-general. The first exception to this rule was New Zealand, which was granted Dominion status in 1907, but it was not until 28 June 1917 that Arthur Foljambe, 2nd Earl of Liverpool, was appointed the first governor-general of New Zealand.

Since the 1950s, the title governor-general has been given to all representatives of the sovereign in independent non-UK Commonwealth realms. In these cases, the former office of colonial governor was altered (sometimes for the same incumbent) to become governor-general upon independence, as the nature of the office became an entirely independent constitutional representative of the monarch rather than a symbol of previous colonial rule. In these countries the governor-general acts as the monarch's representative, performing the ceremonial and constitutional functions of a head of state.

The only other nation which currently uses the governor-general designation is Iran, which has no connection with any monarchy or the Commonwealth. In Iran, the provincial authority is headed by a governor general (Persian: استاندار ostāndār), who is appointed by the minister of the interior.

== British Empire and the Commonwealth ==
=== British Empire ===
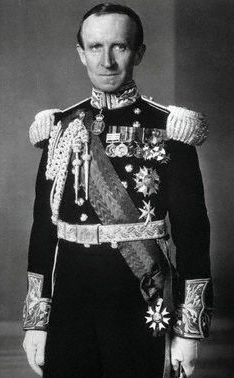
Lord Tweedsmuir was Governor General of Canada from 1935 to 1940. The uniform shown here was the unique ceremonial dress for a governor general

Until the 1920s, governors-general were British subjects, appointed on the advice of the British government, who acted as agents of the British government in each Dominion, as well as being representatives of the monarch. As such they notionally held the prerogative powers of the monarch, and also held the executive power of the country to which they were assigned. The governor-general could be instructed by the colonial secretary on the exercise of some of his functions and duties, such as the use or withholding of royal assent from legislation; history shows many examples of governors-general using their prerogative and executive powers. The monarch or imperial government could overrule any governor-general, though this could often be cumbersome, due to the remoteness of the territories from London.

The governor-general was also usually the commander-in-chief of the armed forces in their territory and, because of the governor-general's control of the military, the post was as much a military appointment as a civil one. The governors-general are entitled to wear a unique uniform, which is not generally worn today. If of the rank of major general, equivalent or above, they were entitled to wear that military uniform.

=== Commonwealth realms ===
Following the Imperial Conference, and subsequent issuing of the Balfour Declaration in 1926, the role and responsibilities of the governor-general began to shift, reflecting the increased independence of the Dominions (which were in 1952 renamed realms; a term which includes the UK itself). As the sovereign came to be regarded as monarch of each territory independently, and, as such, advised only by the ministers of each country in regard to that country's national affairs (as opposed to a single British monarch ruling all the Dominions as a conglomerate and advised only by an imperial parliament), so too did the governor-general become a direct representative of the national monarch only, who no longer answered to the British government. The report resulting from the 1926 Imperial Conference stated: "It is an essential consequence of the equality of status existing among the members of the British Commonwealth of Nations that the Governor General of a Dominion is the representative of the Crown, holding in all essential respects the same position in relation to the administration of public affairs in the Dominion as is held by His Majesty the King in Great Britain, and that he is not the representative or agent of His Majesty's Government in Great Britain or of any Department of that Government." These concepts were entrenched in legislation with the enactment of the Statute of Westminster in 1931, and governmental relations with the United Kingdom were placed in the hands of a British High Commissioner in each country.

In other words, the political reality of a self-governing Dominion within the British Empire with a governor-general answerable to the sovereign became clear. British interference in the Dominion was not acceptable and independent country status was clearly displayed. Canada, Australia, and New Zealand were clearly not controlled by the United Kingdom. The monarch of these countries (Charles III) is in law King of Canada, King of Australia, and King of New Zealand and only acts on the advice of the ministers in each country and is ostensibly in no way influenced by the British government. Today, therefore, in former British colonies that are now independent Commonwealth realms, the governor-general is constitutionally the representative of the monarch in their state and may exercise the reserve powers of the monarch according to their own constitutional authority. The governor-general, however, is still appointed by the monarch and takes an oath of allegiance to the monarch in right of their own country. Executive authority is also vested in the monarch, though much of it can be exercisable only by the governor-general on behalf of the sovereign of the independent realm. Letters of credence or letters of recall are in some realms received or issued in the name of the monarch, but in others (such as Canada and Australia) are issued in the name of the governor-general alone.

At diplomatic functions where the governor-general is present, the visiting diplomat or head of state toasts "The King" or "The Queen" of the relevant realm, not the governor-general, with any reference to the governor-general being subsidiary in later toasts if featuring at all, and will involve a toast to the governor-general by name, not office. (e.g., "Mrs. Smith", not "Her Excellency, the Governor-General". Sometimes a toast might be made using name and office, e.g., "Governor-General Smith".)

Except in rare cases (for example, a constitutional crisis), the governor-general usually acts in accordance with constitutional convention and upon the advice of the national prime minister (who is head of the nation's government). The governors-general are still the local representatives of the sovereign and perform the same duties as they carried out historically, though their role is for the most part ceremonial (or partly ceremonial). Rare and controversial exceptions occurred in 1926, when Canadian governor general the Viscount Byng of Vimy refused Prime Minister Mackenzie King's request for a dissolution of parliament; in 1953 and 1954 when the governor-general of Pakistan, Ghulam Mohammad, staged a constitutional coup against the prime minister and then the Constituent Assembly; and in 1975, when the governor-general of Australia, Sir John Kerr, dismissed the prime minister, Gough Whitlam (to name a few). It should be remembered that while governors-general do not normally take drastic action, he or she still has a responsibility to ensure that the constitution is respected and followed at all times. In many ways, the governor-general acts as an umpire/mediator (who must remain independent/non-partisan and objective) in the political scene. In some realms, the monarch could in principle overrule a governor-general, as governors-general are representatives of the monarch rather than holding power in their own right, but this has not happened in recent times.

In Australia, the present king is generally assumed to be the head of state, since the governor-general and the state governors are defined as his "representatives". However, since the governor-general performs almost all national regal functions, the governor-general has occasionally been referred to as the head of state in political and media discussion. To a lesser extent, uncertainty has been expressed in Canada as to which officeholder—the monarch, the governor-general, or both—can be considered the head of state.

A governor-general is usually a person with a distinguished record of public service, often a retired politician, judge or military commander; however, some countries have also appointed prominent academics, members of the clergy, philanthropists, or figures from the news media to the office.

Traditionally, the governor-general's official attire was a unique uniform, but this practice has been abandoned except on occasions when it is appropriate to be worn (and in some countries abandoned altogether). In South Africa, the governor-general of the Union of South Africa nominated by the Afrikaner Nationalist government chose not to wear uniform on any occasion. Most governors-general continue to wear appropriate medals on their clothing when required.

The governor-general's official residence is usually called Government House. The governor-general of the Irish Free State resided in the then Viceregal Lodge in Phoenix Park, Dublin, but the government of Éamon de Valera sought to downgrade the office and the last governor-general, Domhnall Ua Buachalla, did not reside there. The office was abolished there in 1936.

In most Commonwealth realms, the flag of the governor-general has been the standard pattern of a blue field with the royal crest (a lion standing on a crown) above a scroll with the name of the jurisdiction. In Canada, however, this was replaced with a crowned lion clasping a maple leaf. In the Solomon Islands, the scroll was replaced with a two-headed frigate bird motif, while in Fiji, the former governor general's flag featured a whale's tooth. In New Zealand, the flag was replaced in 2008 with the shield of the coat of arms of New Zealand surmounted by a crown on a blue field.

Governors-general are accorded the style of His/Her Excellency. This style is also extended to their spouses, whether male or female.

==== Appointment ====
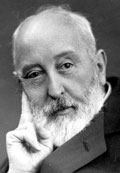
Tim Healy, first Governor-General of the Irish Free State

Until the 1920s, governors general were British, and appointed on the advice of the British Government.

Following the changes to the structure of the Commonwealth in the late 1920s, in 1929, the Australian prime minister James Scullin established the right of a Dominion prime minister to advise the monarch directly on the appointment of a governor-general, by insisting that his choice (Isaac Isaacs, an Australian) prevail over the recommendation of the British government. The convention was gradually established throughout the Commonwealth that the governor-general would be a citizen of the country concerned, and would be appointed on the advice of the government of that country, with no input from the British government; governor general of Canada since 1952 and governor-general of New Zealand since 1967. Since 1931 as each former Dominion has patriated its constitution from the UK, the convention has become law, or, since 1947, when the first realms established with a patriated constitution, India and Pakistan, were established, was always law, and no government of any realm can advise the Monarch on any matter pertaining to another realm, including the appointment of a governor-general. The monarch appoints a governor-general (in Canada: governor general) as a personal representative only on the advice of the prime minister of each realm; for example, the governor-general of New Zealand is appointed by the king of New Zealand on the advice of the New Zealand prime minister, the governor-general of Tuvalu is appointed by the king of Tuvalu on the advice of the Tuvaluan prime minister, and the governor-general of Jamaica is appointed by the king of Jamaica on the advice of the Jamaican prime minister. In Papua New Guinea and the Solomon Islands, the prime minister's advice is based on the result of a vote in the national parliament.

Governors-general who were royal princes

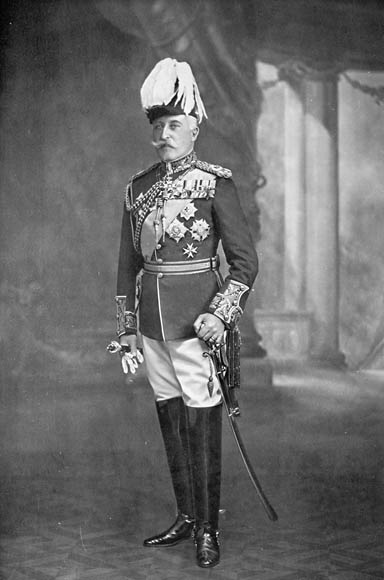
The Duke of Connaught, son of Queen Victoria, was Governor General of Canada.

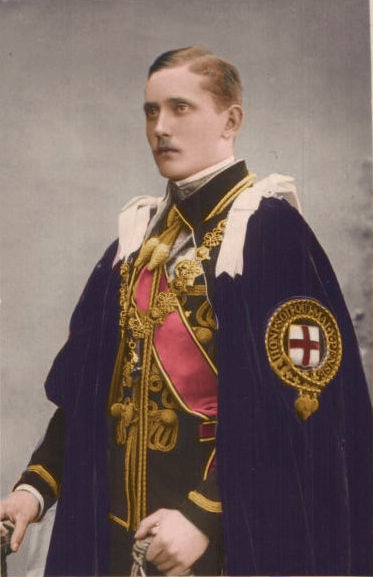
Prince Arthur of Connaught, son of the Duke of Connaught, was Governor-General of South Africa.

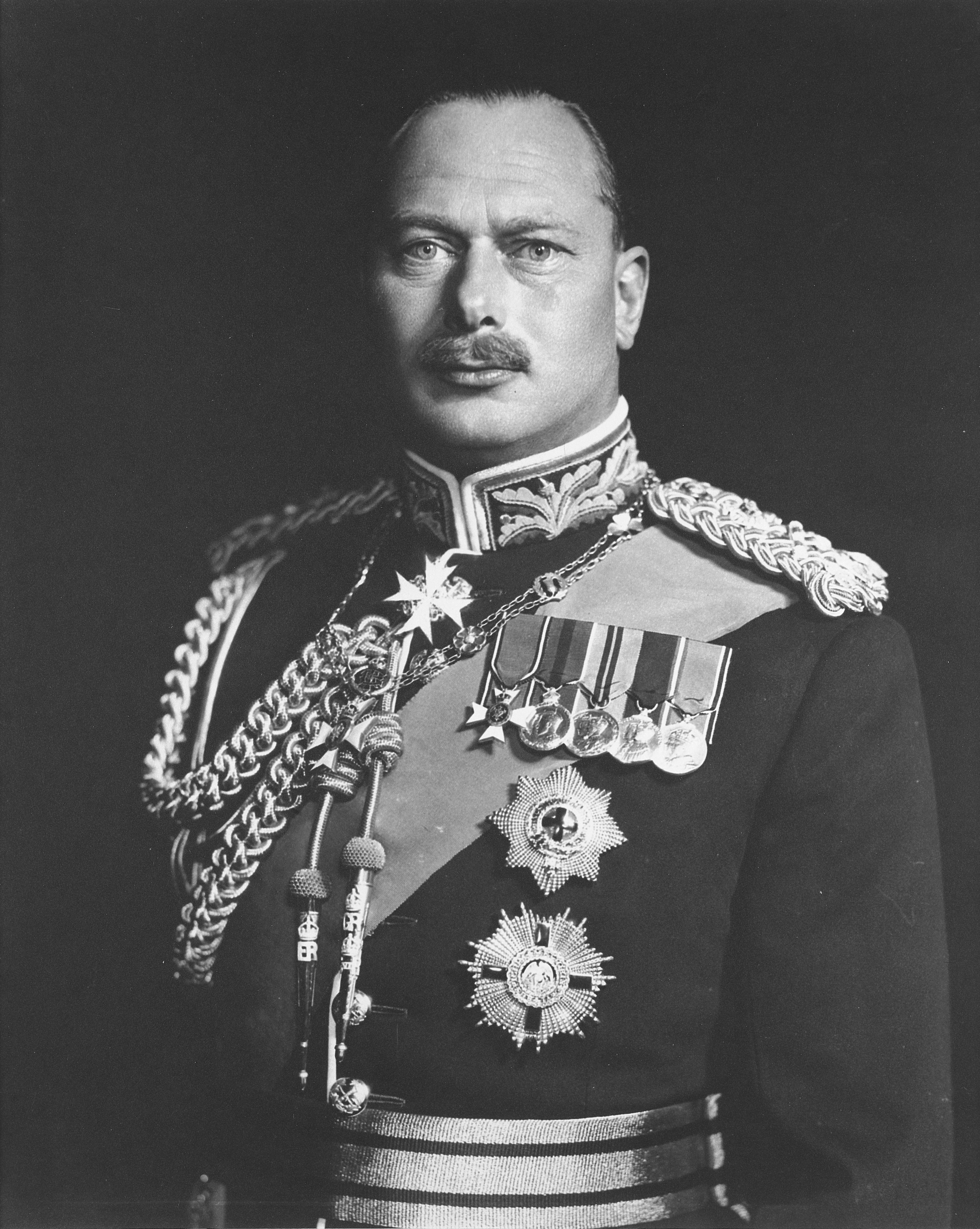
The Duke of Gloucester, son of King George V, was Governor General of Australia.

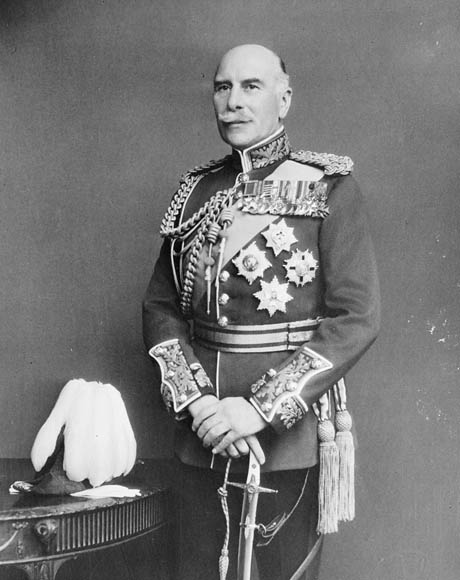
The Earl of Athlone, brother of Queen Mary, was Governor General of both Canada and South Africa, respectively.

The formalities for appointing governors-general are not the same in all realms. For example: When appointed, a governor-general of Australia issues a proclamation in his own name, countersigned by the head of government and under the Great Seal of Australia, formally announcing that he has been appointed by the monarch's commission, previously issued also under the Great Seal of Australia. The practice in Canada is to include in the governor general's proclamation of appointment, issued under the Great Seal of Canada, the monarch's commission naming the governor general as commander-in-chief of the Canadian Forces. Also dissimilar among the realms are the powers of governors-general. The Belizean constitution provides the governor-general with the power to assent or to withhold assent to laws, while Papua New Guinea has no requirement for royal assent at all, with laws entering into force when certified as having been passed in Parliament by the Speaker.

==== Temporary replacement ====
Different realms have different constitutional arrangements governing who acts in place of the governor-general in the event of their death, resignation, or incapacity.

- In Australia, an administrator of the Commonwealth performs the necessary official functions in the absence of the governor-general. The Administrator is generally the longest-serving available state governor. Each of the state governors normally hold a dormant commission, which allows them to immediately assume the office as needed. Cases have however occurred where a state governor has fallen out of favour with the federal government, causing the latter to revoke that governor's dormant commission. The most recent example was that of Sir Colin Hannah, governor of Queensland, in 1975.
- In the Bahamas, Canada, Jamaica, and New Zealand, it is the chief justice.
- In Papua New Guinea, Solomon Islands and Tuvalu it is the Speaker
- Many have a specific office of deputy governor-general, who act in their place—but often e.g. only for temporary incapacity.

=== List of countries with a governor-general ===
==== Current ====
Commonwealth realm	Article	From
Antigua and Barbuda	Governor-General of Antigua and Barbuda	1981
Australia	Governor-General of Australia	1901
The Bahamas	Governor-General of the Bahamas	1973
Belize	Governor-General of Belize	1981
Canada	Governor General of Canada	1867
Grenada	Governor-General of Grenada	1974
Jamaica	Governor-General of Jamaica	1962
New Zealand	Governor-General of New Zealand	1917
Papua New Guinea	Governor-General of Papua New Guinea	1975
Saint Kitts and Nevis	Governor-General of Saint Kitts and Nevis	1983
Saint Lucia	Governor-General of Saint Lucia	1979
Saint Vincent and the Grenadines	Governor-General of Saint Vincent and the Grenadines	1979
Solomon Islands	Governor-General of Solomon Islands	1978
Tuvalu	Governor-General of Tuvalu	1978

==== Former ====
The title has been used in many former British colonies or other territories, which became independent realms and then later became republics. Each of these realms had a governor-general.

In Africa

- Governor-General of the Gambia (1965–1970)
- Governor-General of Ghana (1957–1960)
- Governor-General of Kenya (1963–1964)
- Governor-General of Malawi (1964–1966)
- Governor-General of Mauritius (1968–1992)
- Governor-General of Nigeria (1960–1963)
- Governor-General of the Federation of Rhodesia and Nyasaland (1953–1963) (Although the position was called governor-general, the federation was neither a dominion nor an independent country.)
- Governor-General of Sierra Leone (1961–1971)
- Governor-General of the Union of South Africa (1910–1961)
- Governor-General of Tanganyika (1961–1962)
- Governor-General of Uganda (1962–1963)
- In Rhodesia (now Zimbabwe), a unique situation arose following the Unilateral Declaration of Independence in 1965, unrecognised by the United Kingdom. The Rhodesian Front government of Ian Smith recognised Elizabeth II as "Queen of Rhodesia", but refused to recognise the authority of her governor, Sir Humphrey Gibbs, whose duties were performed by an "officer administering the government", Clifford Dupont (1905–1978). Dupont served in the post until 2 March 1970, when Rhodesia was declared a republic (an act also unrecognised internationally), and he became president. The country became an independent republic within the Commonwealth as Zimbabwe on 18 April 1980.

In the Americas

- Governor-General of the West Indies Federation (1958–1962) (Although the position was called governor-general, the federation was neither a dominion nor an independent country.)
- Governor-General of Barbados (1966–2021)
- Governor-General of Guyana (1966–1970)
- Governor-General of Trinidad and Tobago (1962–1976)

In Asia

- Governor-General of Ceylon (1948–1972)
- Governor-General of India (1833–1950)
- Governor-General of Pakistan (1947–1956)

In Europe

- Governor-General of the Irish Free State (1922–1936)
- Governor-General of Malta (1964–1974)

In Oceania

- Governor-General of Fiji (1970–1987)

== Other colonial and similar usage ==
=== Belgium ===
- Belgian Congo;
- Ruanda-Urundi

=== France ===
The equivalent term in French is gouverneur général, (Note: The term Gouverneur général is still the official title in French in Canada, but refers to the British-instituted office.) used in the following colonies:

- From 1887 to 1945 the French appointed a governor-general to govern French Indochina (modern-day Cambodia, Laos, and Vietnam); the function of the high commissioner in the Pacific Ocean, from 22 March 1907 held by the governors of New Caledonia, was used to coordinate that colony, the other French settlements in Oceania and the other governors of French Indochina and the resident commissioners of the New Hebrides and the residents of Wallis and Futuna were subordinated to him.
- The governor-general of New France was the vice-regal post in New France from 1663 until 1760 and was the last French vice-regal post. It was replaced by the British post of governor of the Province of Quebec following the fall of New France. While the districts of Montreal and Trois-Rivières had their own governors, the governor-general of New France and the governor of the district of Quebec were the same person.
- From 1699 to 1947, the French appointed a governor and general commander (French: Gouverneur de Pondichéry et commandant général des établissements français aux Indes orientales) to administer French India (including Pondichéry).
- Governors-general of the Mascarene Islands (under control of the chartered French Indies Company to 14 July 1767) from 4 June 1735 (succeeding to governors), and after its split-up of Mauritius (Réunion and the Seychelles got lower-styled commandants or governors), until 25 September 1803
- Haiti January 1714 – 31 December 1803; last incumbent Jean-Jacques Dessalines shortly maintained the title after the January I, 1804 independence before proclaiming himself Emperor Jacques I
- Since its creation on 16 June 1895 in French West Africa (AOF), until 4 April 1957; the last stayed on as first of two high commissioners
- Madagascar
- From 28 June 1908 (previously it had a Commissaire général, i.e. commissioner general) to 4 April 1957 (the last stayed on as first of three high commissioners) in French Equatorial Africa (AEF); during several periods he also acted as governor of the constitutive colony Congo Brazzaville.

Furthermore, in Napoleonic Europe successive French governors-general were appointed by Napoleon I in:

- the German states of Brandenburg (various others got "mere" governors), two incumbents between 27 October 1806 and 10 December 1808, during the French occupation
- Province of Courland under the French occupation (from 1 August 1812, Duchy of Courland and Semigallia and District of Pilten nominally re-established under joint French-Saxon protectorate 8 October 1812 – 20 December 1812) : Jacques David Martin, baron de Campredon (1761–1837)
- Parma and Piacenza under occupation, (after a commissioner) 15 February 1804 – 23 July 1808, later annexed as département under a "prefect of Taro".
- principality of Piombino May 1806 – 1811: Adolphe Beauvais (d. 1811)
- annexed Tuscany, two incumbents, over prefects for Arno, Méditerranée [Mediterranean] and Ombrone:
  - May 1808 – 3 March 1809 Jacques François de Boussay, baron de Menou (1750–1810)
  - 3 March 1809 – 1 February 1814 Elisa Baciocchi Bonaparte (with courtesy style of Grand Duchess of Tuscany) (1777–1820)
- the Illyrian Provinces (comprising present Croatia, Slovenia and even adjacent parts of Austria and Italy), annexed as part of the French Empire proper, 14 October 1809 – August 1813

=== Italy ===
During the fascist period, Libya and East Africa were ruled by governor-generals, the former from 1934 to 1943, and the latter from 1936 to 1941 (who was also the Viceroy of Ethiopia).

=== Japan ===
From 1895 to 1945, Japanese-administered Taiwan had a governor-general. From 1910 to 1945, Japanese-administered Korea had a governor-general. From 1905 to 1910, Japan had a resident-general in Korea.

=== Netherlands ===
From 1610 to 1942 the Dutch appointed a gouverneur-generaal ("governor-general") to govern the Netherlands East Indies, now Indonesia. Between the capitulation of the Dutch East Indies in 1942 and the formal end of colonial rule over Indonesia by the Dutch in 1949, no governor-general was appointed.

While in the Caribbean, various other titles were used, Curaçao had three governors-general between 1816 and 1820:

- 1816–1819 Albert Kikkert
- 1819–1820 Petrus Bernardus van Starkenborgh
- 1820 Isaäk Johannes Rammelman Elsevier

=== Philippines ===
The Philippines from the 16th through the 20th century had a series of governors-general during the Spanish and American colonial periods, as well as the brief Japanese occupation during World War II.

==== Spain ====
Beginning 21 November 1564, the Spanish East Indies had a governor-general, which was under the Viceroy of New Spain based in Mexico. After the successful Mexican War of Independence in 1821, the governor-general reported directly to Spain.

==== United States ====
From 1899 to 1935 under initial military rule then Insular Government, the Philippines was administered by a series of governors-general, first military and then civilian, appointed by the federal government of the United States.

=== Portugal ===
The equivalent word in Portuguese is governador-geral. This title was only used for the governors of the major colonies, indicating that they had, under their authority, several subordinate governors. In most of the colonies, lower titles, mainly governador (governor) or formerly captain-major (capitão-mor), prevailed

- In the Portuguese State of India (Estado da Índia, capital Goa) the style was changed repeatedly for another, mostly vice-rei (Viceroy). The viceroy title was usually reserved for members of the Portuguese royal family, the remaining governors receiving the title of governador-general;
- in Africa, from 1837 Portugal appointed a governor-general to govern the overseas province of Angola, and another to govern the province of Moçambique. For some time, a governor-general was also appointed to rule Cape Verde and Portuguese Guinea, while these territories were united in a single province. Between 1921 and 1930, additional powers were given to some of the Angola and Mozambique governors, who were restyled in full Alto-comissário e governador-geral (high commissioner and governor-general).

==== Brazil ====
In Brazil, after a few governors, from 1578 until its promotion in 1763 to a viceroyalty (though various members of the nobility since 1640 had assumed, without sovereign authority, the title of Viceroy).

== Other Western usage ==
=== Greece ===
The Balkan Wars of 1912–13 led to the Greek acquisition of the so-called "New Lands" (Epirus, Macedonia, Crete and the islands of the eastern Aegean), almost doubling the country's territory. Instead of fully incorporating these new lands into Greece by dividing them into prefectures, the Ottoman administrative system continued in existence for a while, and Law ΔΡΛΔ΄ of 1913 established five governorates-general (Γενικαὶ Διοικήσεις, sing. Γενική Διοίκησις): Epirus, Macedonia, Crete, Aegean and Samos–Ikaria. The governors-general had wide-ranging authority in their territories, and were almost autonomous of the government in Athens.

Law 524 in 1914 abolished the governorates-general and divided the New Lands into regular prefectures, but in 1918 Law 1149 re-instated them as a superordinate administrative level above the prefectures, with Macedonia now divided in two governorates-general, those of Thessaloniki and Kozani–Florina. The governors-general of Thessaloniki, Crete and Epirus were also given ministerial rank. To these was added the Governorate-General of Thrace in 1920–22, comprising Western Thrace and Eastern Thrace (returned to Turkey in the Armistice of Mudanya in 1922). The extensive but hitherto legally rather undefined powers of the governors-general created friction and confusion with other government branches, until their remit was exactly delineated in 1925. The governorates-general, except for that of Thessaloniki, were abolished in 1928, but re-established in December 1929—for Crete, Epirus, Thrace, and Macedonia—and delegated practically all ministerial authorities for their respective areas. Over the next decade, however, in a see-saw of legislative measures that in turn gave and took away authority, they gradually lost most of their powers in favour of the prefectures and the central government in Athens.

Following liberation from the Axis occupation, in 1945 the Governorate-General of Northern Greece was established, initially with subordinate governorates for West Macedonia, Central Macedonia, East Macedonia, and Thrace, the first three of which were then grouped anew into a new Governorate-General of Macedonia, albeit still subject to the Governorate-General of Northern Greece. This awkward arrangement lasted until 1950, when the administration of Macedonia was streamlined, the junior governorates abolished and only the Governorate-General of Northern Greece retained. Finally, in 1955, the Governorate-General of Northern Greece was transformed into the Ministry of Northern Greece, and all other governorates-general elsewhere in Greece were abolished.

=== Sweden ===
From 1636 to 1815, the king of Sweden typically appointed the governors-general of Sweden for the Swedish Dominions on the eastern side of the Baltic Sea and in northern Germany, but occasionally also for Scania.

=== Others ===
- From 1809 to 1918, Russia designated governors-general of Finland in the Grand Duchy of Finland; Governors-General of Poland in Vistula Land and other governors-general in various other governorates-general (Caucasus, Turkestan, Steppes, etc.).
- During World War I in the Russian occupation of Eastern Galicia (1914–1915), the Russian government appointed two successive governors-general, Sergei Sheremetev and Count Georgiy Bobrinsky.
- From 1939 to 1944, during the German occupation of Poland, in that part of the country designated the General Government the Nazi official Hans Frank had the title Governor-General (German: Generalgouverneur für die besetzten polnischen Gebiete – Governor-General of the occupied Polish areas).
- The Kingdom of Saxony had two governors-general during the period of Allied control of the Generalgouvernement Sachsen after the defeat of the French emperor Napoleon I:
  - 28 October 1813 – 8 November 1814 Prince Nikolay Grigorievich Repnin-Volkonsky (Russia) (1778–1845)
  - 8 November 1814 – 8 June 1815 Eberhard Friedrich Christoph Ludwig, Freiherr von der Recke (Prussia) (1744–1826)
- During the occupation of Serbia by Austrian-Hungarian and Bulgarian forces in World War I, the Austrian-Hungarian government appointed three consecutive governors-general:
  - 1 January 1916 – July 1916 Johan Ulrich Graf von Salis-Seewis (1862–1940)
  - July 1916 – October 1918 Adolf Freiherr von Rhemen zu Barensfeld (1855–1932)
  - October 1918 – T1 November 1918 Hermann Freiherr Kövess von Kövessháza (1854–1924; a former military commander in northern Serbia)

== Asian counterparts ==
- From 1644 to 1911, in Qing dynasty China, a governor-general or viceroy (simplified Chinese: 总督; traditional Chinese: 總督; pinyin: Zǒngdū; Wade–Giles: Tsung^{3}-tu^{1}) was the highest official of joint military and civil affairs in one or several provinces.
- The hereditary shōgun of Japan (Japanese: 征夷大将軍, sei-i tai-shōgun) who ruled in the name of the emperor from 1185 until 1868 were equivalent to governors-general, though they often had far greater power than a governor-general would ordinarily have.
- Islamic Republic of Iran
  - The provincial authority is headed by an appointed governor-general (Persian: استاندار, ostāndār).
- Umayyad Empire
  - The governor of Iraq appointed the governors of eastern provinces. Hence the Iraqi governor served as a Viceroy of the Caliph. See: Hajjaj bin Yousuf.
- Vietnam: Viceroys of Vietnam

== See also ==
- Administrator of the government
- Administrator General
- Government House, the name of the official residences of governors-general in the British Commonwealth (past and present)
- Governor
- Governor-in-chief
- Governor-General of the Philippines
- High commissioner
- Lieutenant governor
- Viceroy
- Aruba and the Netherlands Antilles; territories of the Dutch Monarchy
- Guberniya, governor-generalship in the Russian Empire
- Representatives of the Commonwealth of Nations
  - Roman administration of Judaea (AD 6–135) (Roman governors)
  - List of Roman governors of Asia
  - List of Ottoman governors of Egypt
- Some defunct political entities: Governor-General of the Irish Free State, Governor-General of the Federation of the West Indies, Governor-General of the Federation of Rhodesia and Nyasaland, Governor of Southern Rhodesia, Governor-General of French Indochina
- Some former Commonwealth realms in the Americas Governor-General of Barbados, Governor-General of Guyana, Governor-General of Trinidad and Tobago
- Some former Commonwealth realms in Africa: Governor-General of Nigeria, Governor-General of Sierra Leone, Governor-General of Tanzania, Governor-General of the Union of South Africa, Governor-General of Uganda, Governor-General of Gambia, Governor-General of Kenya, Governor-General of Ghana, Governor-General of Malawi
- Some former Commonwealth realms in Asia Governor-General of India, Governor-General of Pakistan, Governor-General of Sri Lanka
- Some former Commonwealth realms in Europe Governor-General of Malta
- Some former Commonwealth realms in Oceania Governor-General of Fiji
