= Pierre-Ernest Dams =

- Born: 14 September 1794; Remich
- Died: 20 December 1855 (aged 61); Jarville-la-Malgrange
- Occupations: politician, journalist, judge

Pierre-Ernest Dams (14 September 1794 – 20 December 1855) was a Luxembourgish politician, judge, and journalist. He was a major figure in the formative years of Luxembourg as an independent country.

== Biography ==
Born in Remich, Dams's father was originally from Dommelen, in the modern Netherlands. During the Belgian Revolution, Dams was elected to the National Congress of Belgium to represent the district of Grevenmacher. There, he voted for the Declaration of Independence, against the Treaty of Twenty-Eight Articles, and for making Leopold of Saxe-Coburg and Gotha King of the Belgians. In 1831, he was elected to represent the constituency of Grevenmacher in the Chamber of Representatives. He voted against the Treaty of Twenty-Four Articles, which later became the framework for the Treaty of London. He remained in the Chamber of Representatives until 1837, when he was replaced by Charles Metz.

Luxembourg was separated from Belgium by the Treaty of London in 1839, and Dams re-entered political life in the Grand Duchy. He was a member of the Assembly of the States, representing Remich from 1842 to 1845. He was elected to the Constituent Assembly, which drafted Luxembourg's new constitution in 1848. From 1848 to 1853, Dams was a member of the Chamber of Deputies.
