= François-Xavier Wurth-Paquet =

Luxembourgish politician

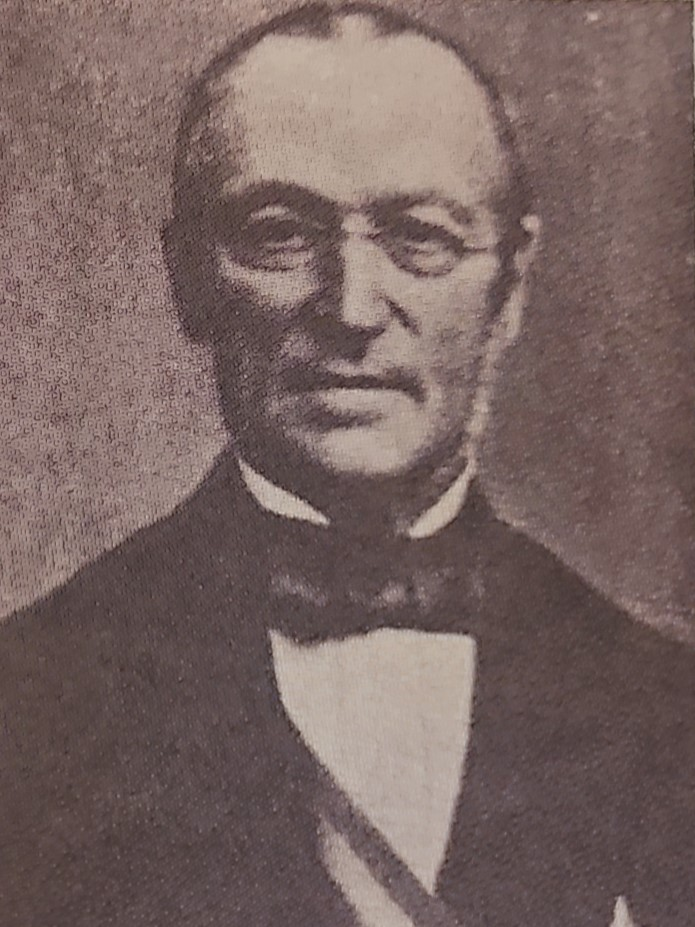
François-Xavier Wurth-Paquet

François-Xavier Wurth-Paquet (16 April 1801 – 4 February 1885) was a Luxembourgish politician, jurist, and archaeologist.

Born in Luxembourg City, he studied law in Liège and then became a lawyer, judge, prosecutor and in 1848 president of the Superior Court.

From 1845 to 1848 he was a member of the Assembly of Estates. He was elected to represent the canton of Esch-sur-Alzette on the Constituent Assembly, in 1848. An Orangist, he served in the cabinet of Charles-Mathias Simons as Administrator-General for Justice from 1853 to 1856, and as Administrator-General for the Interior from 1856 to 1858. He later was a member of the Council of State from 6 October 1858 to 4 February 1885, and was its President from 1870 until 1871.

Wurth-Pacquet was the founding President of Luxembourg's Archaeological Association, the forerunner of the Historical Section of the Grand Ducal Institute. He held that office from 1845 until 1853, when he entered government, and again from 1876 until his death in 1885.

In the publications of this institution, he made inventories of old Luxembougish documents, also publishing extracts. He managed to examine 18,000 documents, and also copies of 60,000 documents from abroad. He granted this collection to the Institute after his death. He also helped established what has now become the National Museum of History and Art.

He died in 1885 in Luxembourg City.

Wurth-Pacquet's daughter was Hélène Wurth, who married into the Brasseur family. Her husband, Pierre Brasseur, was a mining magnate that founded the company that would later become ARBED. The couple in turn had five children, including politician Xavier Brasseur.

== Footnotes ==
Political offices
Preceded by Jean-Jacques Willmar	Administrator-General for Justice; 1853 – 1856	Succeeded by Charles-Gérard Eyschen
Preceded by Charles-Mathias Simons	President of the Council of State; 1870 – 1871	Succeeded by Vendelin Jurion
