= Jean Ulveling =

Luxembourgish politician (1796–1878)

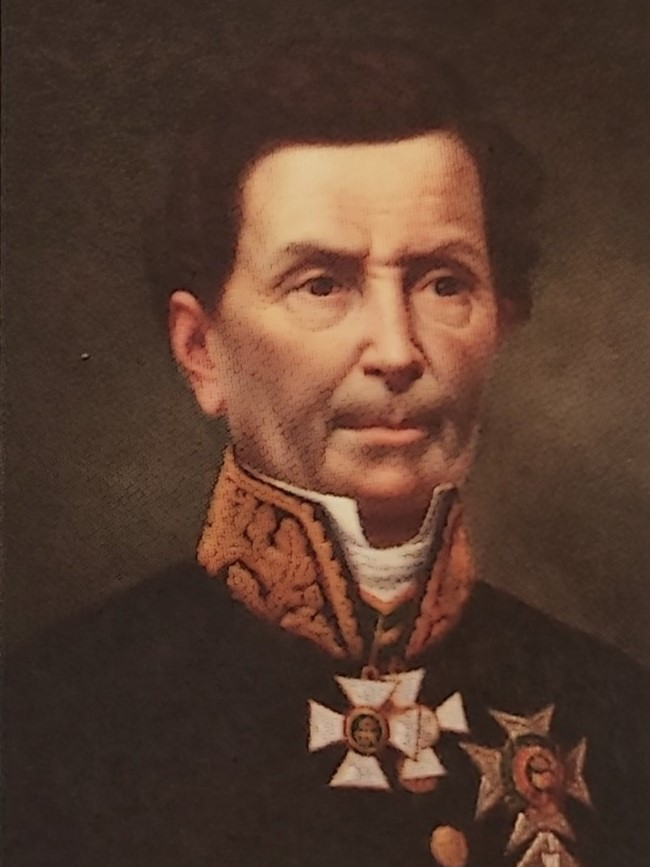
Jean Ulveling

Jean Ulveling (3 April 1796, in Niederwiltz (near Wiltz) – 7 December 1878, in Luxembourg City) was a Luxembourgish statesman, politician, and historian. He served as a member of the Council of State of Luxembourg for some years, and was a member of the Constituent Assembly which framed a new constitution in 1848. From 1854 to 1856 he represented the canton of Wiltz in the Chamber of Deputies.

== Life ==
In 1817 he joined the civil service, in which he was to spend his career. In 1820 he joined the cabinet of governor Jean-Jacques Willmar. In the Belgian Revolution he was on the side of the Orangists. In a pamphlet published in 1832, he praised the policies of William I of the Netherlands. In 1840 he became a member of the provisional government, which was called the Régence.

In 1842 he became a tax Conseiller. After the French Revolution of 1848 took place in February, there was significant unrest in Luxembourg, especially in Ettelbruck from 12 to 23 March. The Republican (that is to say, French) flag was raised, and this was imitated in several other localities. On 15 March the government councilors Ulveling and Pescatore were delegated by the government to travel immediately to Ettelbruck and take whatever measures were necessary in the interests of public order, the law and the people. Elections in order to draft a new constitution took place on 19 April. Ulveling was elected as a member representing the canton of Wiltz to the Constituent Assembly that met in Ettelbruck, and helped write the new Constitution. On 1 August 1848 he became Administrateur général (Minister) for Finance in the Fontaine Ministry and in December, after its resignation, he became Administrateur général for Communal Affairs in the Willmar Ministry. When this was succeeded in 1853 by the Simons Ministry, Ulveling became a member of the executive board of the Hospices Civils and became a director of the Caisse de crédit foncier. In 1855 he became director of the tax administration and in 1857 became director of the cadaster.

In 1854 he became a local councillor for Luxembourg City, and was deputy mayor in 1856 and 1858.

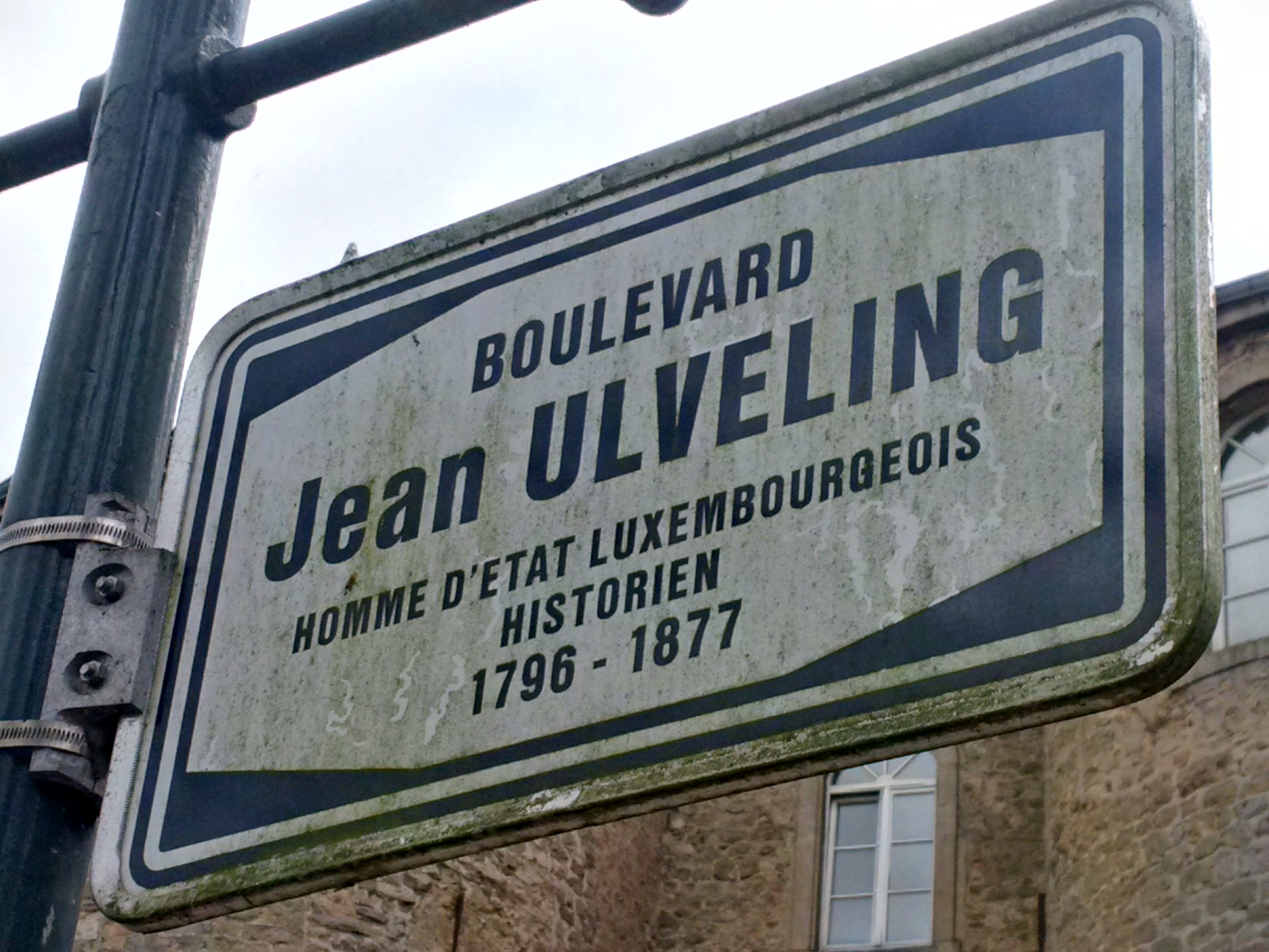
Boulevard Jean Ulveling in Luxembourg City

He was a member of the Chamber of Deputies from 1854 to 1856 for Canton Wiltz. In 1858 he became Director-General (Minister) again, this time in the Simons Ministry. He was initially responsible for the Interior, then for Finance. He filled the same role in the Tornaco Ministry. In 1866 he resigned. From 1857 to 1858 and from 1866 until 1877 he was a member of the Council of State.

== Publications ==
Ulveling left many publications: some were overviews of the political situation of the periods which he had lived through, but most were concerned with historical issues. The history of the construction of the Fortress of Luxembourg particularly fascinated him, and he wrote many articles on this in the Publications de l'Institut Grand-Ducal, Section Historique. He also wrote on the history of guilds in the city, and the history of Altmünster Abbey.

== Family ==
He had two sons, Martin Ulveling and Georges Ulveling.
