= 1851 Luxembourg general election =

Partial general elections were held in Luxembourg on 10 June 1851, electing members of the Chamber of Deputies.

== Results ==
Canton	Seats	Candidate	First round	Second round
Canton	Seats	Candidate	Votes	Votes
Luxembourg	5	Paquet (Note: Elected at the first round with absolute majority)	905	
Luxembourg	5	Théodore Eberhardt	876	
Luxembourg	5	Augustin Lampach	715	
Luxembourg	5	Dominique Stifft	688	
Luxembourg	5	Mathias Hertert	621	
Luxembourg	5	Simons	398	
Luxembourg	5	Weber	347	
Luxembourg	5	Fendius	251	
Luxembourg	5	Buchholtz	208	
Luxembourg	5	Simonis	151	
Luxembourg	5	Turnout	1162	
Grevenmacher	4	Auguste Metz	376	
Grevenmacher	4	Joseph Heynen	346	
Grevenmacher	4	Joseph Ritter	292	
Grevenmacher	4	Antoine Pütz (Note: Elected after the second round)	251	306
Grevenmacher	4	André	187	210
Grevenmacher	4	Victor Schoren	186	
Grevenmacher	4	Wies	168	
Grevenmacher	4	Muller-Walse	157	
Grevenmacher	4	Turnout	562	-
Wiltz	4	Charles Mathieu	430	
Wiltz	4	Jean Krack	194	259
Wiltz	4	Henri Greisch	195	204
Wiltz	4	Jacques Bernard	192	191
Wiltz	4	Mathias Neumann	163	167
Wiltz	4	Michel Frères	155	156
Wiltz	4	Michel Fallis	90	89
Wiltz	4	Dagois	74	
Wiltz	4	Turnout	-	
Mersch	4	Michel Clement	420	
Mersch	4	Henri Witry	403	
Mersch	4	Jean-Pierre Hoffmann	392	
Mersch	4	Jean-Pierre Heuardt	373	
Mersch	4	De Roebé	107	
Mersch	4	Glesener	91	
Mersch	4	Servais	67	
Mersch	4	Fisch	47	
Mersch	4	Turnout	487	
Esch-sur-Alzette	5	Auguste Collart	466	
Esch-sur-Alzette	5	François-Louis-Guillaume Gras	401	
Esch-sur-Alzette	5	François Müller	454	
Esch-sur-Alzette	5	Clément Hemmer	387	
Esch-sur-Alzette	5	Victor de Tornaco	357	
Esch-sur-Alzette	5	Schintgen	330	
Esch-sur-Alzette	5	Wurth-Paquet	226	
Esch-sur-Alzette	5	De Premorel	121	
Esch-sur-Alzette	5	Turnout	688	
Redange	4	Nas. Schroeder	303	
Redange	4	Renilde Jacques	297	
Redange	4	Jacques-Alexandre Brassel	238	
Redange	4	Dominique Peckels	221	309
Redange	4	Nas. Hippert	134	147
Redange	4	Pierre Neuens	105	
Redange	4	Michel Rausch	102	
Redange	4	Paul-Joseph Philippart	91	
Redange	4	Bassin	62	
Redange	4	Turnout	474	
