= Jean Origer =

Luxembourgish cleric and journalist

Jean Origer

Jean Origer (25 May 1877 - 17 September 1942) was a Luxembourgish cleric and director of the newspaper Luxemburger Wort. Jean Origer was born in Esch-Alzette and later became a member of the Chamber of Deputies of Luxembourg. During World War II, He was interned in the Mauthausen concentration camp where he died. A street in his hometown of Esch-Alzette is named after him.

== See also ==
- KZ Mauthausen
- Luxemburger Wort
