= Jean-Georges Willmar =

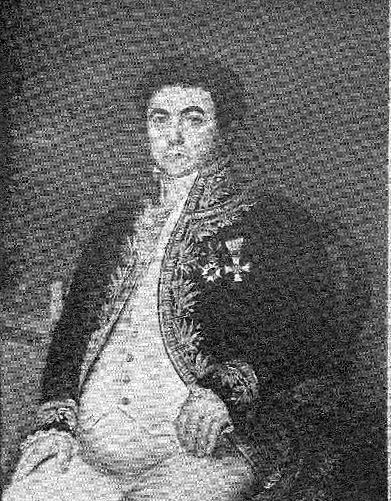
Jean-Georges Willmar

Jean-Georges-Othon-Martin-Victorin-Zacharie Willmar (5 September 1763 - 1 January 1831) was a jurist, and governor of Luxembourg from 1817 to 1830.

He was born in Prüm in the Electorate of Trier, to Jean-Gaspard Willmar and Marie-Marguerite Tande. His father was a doctor of laws and Amtmann (bailiff) of the Ämter of Prüm, Schönecken and Schönberg.

Jean-Georges Willmar attended secondary school at the Royal College in Luxembourg from 1772, then at the University of Louvain. He was a lawyer in the Conseil souverain. When Luxembourg was occupied by French Revolutionary troops, the Armies of the North and of the Sambre and Meuse established an arrondissement administrative council, initially in Saint-Hubert, consisting of 9 members and an "Agent national". It moved to Luxembourg on 16 June 1795 after the Fortress had surrendered. On the council's advice, General Joubert appointed Willmar as deputy Agent national. The actual Agent national, Vincent Legier, was frequently away on trips to Brussels or Paris. When Luxembourg was incorporated into the Département des Forêts, Willmar was appointed president of the criminal tribunal.

In April 1800 he was nominated under-prefect of Bitburg.

In 1815 he became provisional governor of the Grand Duchy, and on 29 May 1817 was made governor. An important part of this function was inspecting the Grand Duchy village by village and writing reports on the conditions here. A recurring theme of these reports was the poor state of the roads. As governor, he also reported to The Hague on the ever-rising discontent of the people over taxes, seen as too high and unfair.

After the Belgian Revolution, he remained loyal to the Dutch king, although Jean-Baptiste Nothomb had indicated that he could remain governor of a Belgian Luxembourg, and his son Jean-Jacques Willmar could become president of the tribunal of Arlon. There was however, little will to compromise on the part of the Dutch King, and Prince William II was imposed as governor of the southern provinces.

On 1 January 1831 he died in Luxembourg city.

Jean-Georges Willmar was married twice: first to Marie-Catherine Graas, who died in 1794, and with whom he had five children, including Jean-Jacques Willmar, and secondly to Marie-Jeanne Graas, Marie-Catherine's sister, with whom he had one son.
