= Vendelin Jurion =

Luxembourgish politician and jurist

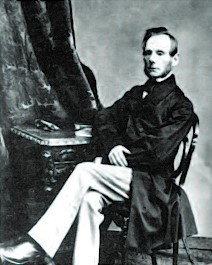

President of the Council of State
- In office 15 March 1871 – 15 March 1872
- Preceded by: François-Xavier Wurth-Paquet
- Succeeded by: Édouard Thilges

Administrator-General for the Interior
- In office 1 August 1848 – 2 December 1848; 22 September 1853 – 21 May 1856

Personal details
- Born: 4 June 1806 Bitburg, French Republic
- Died: 10 February 1892 (aged 85) Grand Duchy of Luxembourg

Vendelin Jurion (4 June 1806 – 10 February 1892) was a Luxembourgish politician and jurist.

Jurion was born on 4 June 1806 in Bitburg, now in Germany but then a part of the French département of Forets (and, until its annexation by France, of the Duchy of Luxembourg). Jurion became an advocate on the district court in Diekirch, and later in Luxembourg City. While in Diekirch, he sat on the communal council, becoming mayor.

In 1843, Jurion entered the administration of Luxembourg. He was elected to represent the canton of Diekirch on the Constituent Assembly, in 1848. When Luxembourg's first constitution was promulgated in 1848, he entered the Chamber of Deputies and served in the cabinet of Prime Minister Gaspard-Théodore-Ignace de la Fontaine as Administrator-General for the Interior. He returned to government in this capacity under Charles-Mathias Simons (1853–1856).

After leaving the Chamber of Deputies, he entered the Council of State, over which he presided between 1871 and 1872.

== Footnotes ==
Political offices
Preceded by François-Xavier Wurth-Paquet	President of the Council of State; 1871–1872	Succeeded by Édouard Thilges
