= Orangism (Luxembourg) =

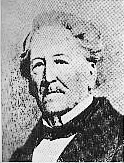
Gaspard-Théodore-Ignace de la Fontaine, leader of the Orangists

Orangism was a movement in the 19th century Grand Duchy of Luxembourg favouring the personal union of the Netherlands and Luxembourg under the House of Orange-Nassau.

== Background ==
Made up of many notable figures, mainly nobles and Roman Catholic clergy, they were moderate liberals or conservative-liberals and slightly anti-clerical. At first they favoured maintaining the Grand Duchy's autonomous status and, especially during the Belgian Revolution, opposed it being merged into Belgium. In the end the western part of the Grand Duchy (the present province of Luxembourg) passed to Belgium, whilst the eastern part and the Orange grand duchy continued as an independent state.

In 1890 the heads of the House of Orange were grand dukes of Luxembourg, but on the death of king and grand duke William III in 1890 he was succeeded by his relation Adolphe as grand duke since Luxembourg's constitution did not allow a woman (Princess Wilhelmina) to hold the throne.

The movement's newsletter was the Journal de la Ville et du Pays Luxembourg.

== Members ==
The movement was led by Gaspard-Théodore-Ignace de la Fontaine (1787–1871) and other notable members included:

- Jean-Georges and Jean-Jacques Willmar
- Auguste and Victor, barons of Tornaco
- Friedrich and Félix, barons of Blochausen
- Charles-Gérard Eyschen (father of the later prime minister Paul Eyschen)
- François-Xavier Wurth-Paquet
- Antoine, Jean-Pierre and Ferdinand Pescatore
- Jean Ulveling
- Henri Vannerus
- Collart von Fischbach
- Willibrord Macher
- Mathieu-Lambert Schrobilgen
- Jean-Pierre Maeysz (Roman Catholic priest)
- Michel-Nicolas Muller (Roman Catholic priest and professor at the Atheneum van Luxemburg)
- Valentin Trausch (Roman Catholic priest)
