= Luxembourg coup of 1856 =

1856 reactionary revision of Luxembourg's constitution

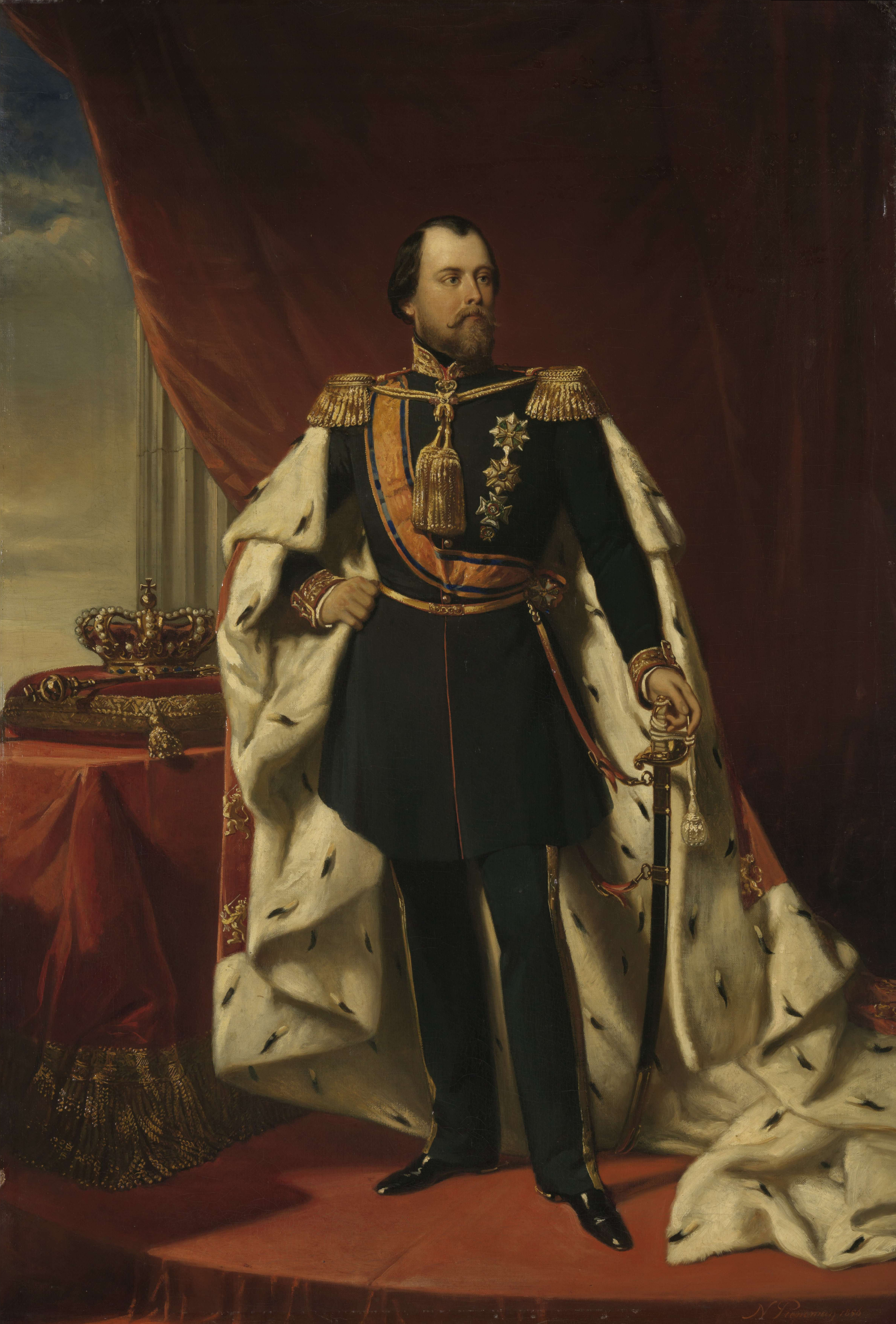
William III, Grand Duke of Luxembourg

The Luxembourg coup of 1856, also called the putsch of 1856, was a reactionary revision of Luxembourg's constitution on 27 November 1856. Whilst not a true coup d'état or revolution, its detractors dubbed it a "royal coup", as the reigning Grand Duke of Luxembourg, William III, greatly expanded his powers, and the name has stuck. Aimed at reversing the liberal successes embodied in the 1848 constitution, the major changes enacted by William were undone with the promulgation of a new constitution in 1868, after the Luxembourg Crisis. However, some changes have lasted, such as the creation of the Council of State.

== Background ==
The formation and sustaining of a government required the support of both the Chamber of Deputies and the Grand Duke. Without the former, the de la Fontaine government collapsed in 1848, whilst Jean-Jacques Willmar's government was fired by the Grand Duke in 1853 despite still having the confidence of the Chamber of Deputies. This created a rivalry between the monarchy and the Chamber.

In the speech from the throne on 7 October 1856, the Governor of Luxembourg, Prince Henry, announced the amendment of the constitution, which he claimed was required to bring it into line with the rest of the German Confederation. The liberals in the Chamber were outraged, and demanded that any changes respect the freedoms won in the Revolutions of 1848 and the independence of Luxembourg from the Netherlands, which was in a personal union with Luxembourg. The liberals' draft reply was passed by 31 votes to 15.

On 28 October, the Chamber voted to adjourn on 19 November. On that day, the Chamber withdrew its confidence in the government and requested another adjournment, which was rejected. The liberals left the Chamber, refusing to return the following day. In response to this, the Grand Duke dissolved the Chamber, and the government presented the Grand Duke with a new constitution, as well as a condemnation of the opposition's withdrawal. The Grand Duke signed on 27 November, and the changes were published in Mémorial on 30 November. It was approved by the German Confederation on 29 January 1857.

== Changes ==
The changes included:

- The creation of the Council of State, modelled on the French body and appointed by the Grand Duke. Whilst the appointment model was revised in 1866, the Council of State still exists.
- Restrictions on freedom of the press, lifted in 1868.
- Adding to the constitution that "sovereignty resides in the person of the King-Grand Duke", which was removed with an amendment on 15 May 1919.
- An increase in the poll tax, scrapped only with the introduction of universal suffrage in 1919.
- The reorganization of elections to the Chamber of Deputies to include two classes of voters. Those that paid more than 125 francs in tax elected 15 members representing the districts and those paying between 10 francs and 125 francs elected 16 members representing the cantons, thus giving the rich a representation far beyond their proportion of the population, similar to the provisions of the Constitution of the Kingdom of Prussia adopted a few years before. This was undone by the new constitution in 1868.
