= Jean-Jacques Willmar =

Prime Minister of Luxembourg (1792-1866)

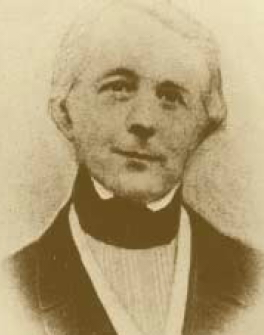

Prime Minister of Luxembourg
- In office 6 December 1848 – 23 September 1853
- Monarchs: William II; William III
- Preceded by: G.T.I. de la Fontaine
- Succeeded by: Charles-Mathias Simons

Personal details
- Born: 6 March 1792; Luxembourg, Austrian Netherlands
- Died: 20 November 1866 (aged 74); Luxembourg, Luxembourg
- Political party: Independent

Jean-Jacques Madeleine Willmar (French pronunciation: [ʒɑ̃ʒak madlɛn wilmaʁ]; 6 March 1792 – 20 November 1866) was a Luxembourgish politician and jurist. An Orangist, he served as prime minister of Luxembourg for five years, from 6 December 1848 until 23 September 1853.

Born in 1792 in the city of Luxembourg, he was the son of Jean-Georges Willmar, who was governor of the Grand Duchy of Luxembourg from 1817 to 1830.

In 1814 he received his Licence in Law in Paris, and became a lawyer at the bar of Luxembourg city. He was appointed a judge in 1824.

From 1830 to 1839, after the Belgian Revolution, he supported the Dutch King William I, during a period when a large part of Luxembourg wanted to join the new Belgian state.

In 1840 he was appointed Procureur général. From 1841 to 1848 he was a member of the Assembly of Estates, and in 1848 was the Luxembourgish representative at the Frankfurt Parliament.

From 2 December 1848 to 23 September 1853 he was prime minister and Administrator-General (Minister) for Foreign Affairs, Justice, Religion and education. Norbert Metz, who had become Finance Minister, and who was pro-Belgian and against membership of the German Confederation and the Zollverein, had a great influence on foreign policy, which led to tensions with Germany. Relations with the Netherlands also became chilled after the death of William II in 1849. His son, William III, who had himself represented by his brother Prince Henry, led a strictly conservative and reactionary policy, and deposed the government in 1853. Willmar's time in office saw the decision to introduce the Franc instead of the Guilder as the accounting unit of the government. In 1854, the first Luxembourgish copper coins were made.

From 28 November 1857 onwards, Willmar was a member of the newly founded Council of State, and remained as such until his death on 26 November 1866 in Luxembourg city.

== See also ==
- Willmar Ministry

Political offices
Preceded by G T I de la Fontaine	Prime Minister of Luxembourg; 1848–1853	Succeeded by Charles-Mathias Simons
Preceded by G T I de la Fontaine	Administrator-General for Foreign Affairs; 1848–1853	Succeeded by Charles-Mathias Simons
Preceded by G T I de la Fontaine	Administrator-General for Justice; 1848–1853	Succeeded by François-Xavier Wurth-Paquet
