= Charles-Mathias Simons =

Luxembourgish politician and jurist (1802–1874)

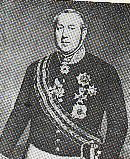

Prime Minister of Luxembourg
- In office 23 September 1853 – 26 September 1860
- Monarch: William III
- Preceded by: Jean-Jacques Willmar
- Succeeded by: Victor de Tornaco

Personal details
- Born: 27 March 1802; Bitburg, Prussia
- Died: 5 October 1874 (aged 72); Luxembourg City, Luxembourg
- Political party: Independent

Charles-Mathias Simons (27 March 1802 – 5 October 1874) was a Luxembourgish politician and jurist who served as Prime Minister of Luxembourg from 1853 until 1860.

He received his Doctorate of Laws in 1823 from the University of Liège. The year after, he registered at the bar of the court of first instance of Diekirch. In 1831 he was a delegate for Diekirch at the Belgian National Congress in Brussels, and helped to draft the new Belgian constitution.

In 1836-1837 he was a member of the provincial council, and in 1841 became a member of the Assembly of Estates. In 1843-1848 he was a member of the cabinet and in 1848 of the Constituent Assembly. From 1 August to 2 December 1848 he became Administrator-general of communal affairs in the de la Fontaine Ministry.

After the Willmar government had been deposed by the governor Prince Henry, at the wish of William III, Charles-Mathias Simons was appointed prime minister on 23 September 1853.

Simons' time as head of government saw the revision of the constitution of October 1856, which the King-Grand-Duke had pushed through against the wishes of the parliament, which strengthened his powers while curtailing those of the parliament, and which imposed the Council of State as a control mechanism on the already weakened parliament. This period also saw the opening of the first railway line in Luxembourg (4 October 1859) and the founding of the first banks, the Banque Internationale à Luxembourg and the Banque et Caisse d'Épargne de l'État.

Simons resigned on 26 September 1860, as opposition to his "coup d'état" government grew too strong in parliament after new elections.

From 1860 to 1874 he was a member of the Council of State and from 5 January 1869 until 5. January 1870 he was its president. He died on 5 October 1874 in Luxembourg City.

== See also ==
- Simons Ministry

== Notes ==
Political offices
| Preceded by Jean-Jacques Willmar | Prime Minister of Luxembourg; 1853–1860 | Succeeded by Baron de Tornaco |
| Preceded by Jean-Jacques Willmar | Director-General for Foreign Affairs; 1853–1860 | Succeeded by Baron de Tornaco |
| Preceded by Guillaume-Mathias Augustin | Director-General for Justice; 1859 | Succeeded by Édouard Thilges |
| Preceded by G T I de la Fontaine | President of the Council of State; 1869–1870 | Succeeded by François-Xavier Wurth-Paquet |
