= Assembly of Estates =

The Assembly of Estates (French: Assemblée des États, German: Ständeversammlung) was the legislature of Luxembourg from 1841 to 1848, and again from 1856 to 1868.

== Background and role ==
The Congress of Vienna awarded the Grand Duchy of Luxembourg to the King of the Netherlands in personal union, as his private property, though it also became part of the German Confederation. King William I therefore became King-Grand Duke. However, he administered Luxembourg essentially as part of the Netherlands, and Luxembourg was represented in the Dutch States General from 1816. In the Belgian Revolution of 1830, the southern provinces of the Netherlands split off to become the Kingdom of Belgium; many Luxembourgers wished to become part of this new Belgian state as well. In the 1839 Treaty of London, however, a compromise was found: the large, mostly French-speaking part of Luxembourg became part of Belgium, as the province of Luxembourg. The remaining, German-speaking part of Luxembourg became the Grand-Duchy of today, and remained under the Dutch King. The Treaty affirmed Luxembourg as an independent and sovereign state, and this "rump" Luxembourg was now geographically separated from the Netherlands. Luxembourg therefore needed its own government institutions.

The Grand-Ducal decree of 12 October 1841 on a "Constitution of the Estates" created an Assembly of Estates, consisting of 34 Deputies. Its powers were highly restricted: it could not take decisions and exercised a purely consultative role alongside the sovereign. Very few matters required its approval, and only the Grand Duke could propose laws. The Assembly only sat for 15 days a year, and these sessions were held in secret.

The Assembly was composed of Deputies who were elected in the cantons by Electors in electoral colleges. These Electors in turn were chosen by those with the right to vote. To be able to vote, one had to be a Luxembourgish citizen, over 25 years of age, and to pay 10 guilders in taxes. Becoming an Elector was subject to similar conditions, but was open only to those paying more than 20 guilders in taxes. This meant that only 3% of the population was entitled to vote, and around 30 notables per canton then chose the Deputies. The Assembly therefore consisted mostly of large-scale landowners. Deputies were elected for renewable terms of 6 years, and every 3 years, half of the Assembly was up for (re-)election.

Under the influence of the revolutionary democratic movements in France and the rest of Europe in 1848, the Constituent Assembly wrote a new Constitution for Luxembourg. This introduced a constitutional monarchy, and gave the legislature, now called the Chamber of Deputies, enhanced powers. It was now able to propose and amend laws, vote on the budget, and launch inquiries. The government became accountable to the legislature, whose sessions were now held publicly.

== Return and abolition ==
The period of 1856-1868 was an interlude, and saw a brief return to authoritarianism. In the Luxembourg Coup of 1856, the King-Grand Duke William III replaced the liberal constitution of 1848 with a new one: the legislature was renamed the "Assembly of Estates", retaining its legislative powers, but the Grand Duke was not required to approve and promulgate its laws within a specific timeframe. Taxes no longer required annual approval, and the permanent budget was re-introduced.

This state of affairs lasted until 1868. After Luxembourg had been declared independent and neutral in the Treaty of London of 1867, a compromise was found between the liberal constitution of 1848 and the authoritarian charter of 1856. The legislature was renamed the Chamber of Deputies, and recovered most of its powers lost in 1856.

== See also ==
- The Estates
- Estates of the realm
