= Constituent Assembly of Luxembourg =

The Constituent Assembly of Luxembourg was a constituent assembly called in 1848 in Luxembourg to write and pass a new national constitution.

The Grand Duchy had been administratively separate from the United Kingdom of the Netherlands since the Belgian Revolution in 1830, but remained in personal union with the Netherlands. The first constitution had been passed in 1841 under William II, but it was a very conservative document, affirming the autocracy of the King-Grand Duke. With the outbreak of the Revolutions of 1848, William changed from a conservative to a liberal, allowing for the preservation of the monarchy in the face of an upsurge in liberal sympathies.

On 24 March, a Grand Ducal decree called for the establishment a commission of fifteen to investigate how to preserve the government. On 30 March, they agreed, by thirteen votes to none (with two abstentions), to call a constituent assembly to rewrite the constitution, and this was accepted by the King-Grand Duke on 1 April. Elections to the assembly were held on 19 April 1848. The assembly met for the first time on 25 April, in the temporary seat of government, Ettelbruck, as Luxembourg City was deemed too dangerous in the revolutionary atmosphere. On 29 April, they moved back to Luxembourg City, using the recently constructed Luxembourg City Hall.

The assembly adopted a constitution on 23 June, and it was given consent by the King-Grand Duke on 10 July. The constitution adopted was similar to the liberal constitution of Belgium, which had been written by the National Congress during the Belgian Revolution. The only substantive difference was the non-inclusion of a senate, which the King-Grand Duke urged to check the power of the new Chamber of Deputies. A senate, the Council of State, would eventually be created in 1856, with William III handing down a new (conservative) constitution against the wishes of the Chamber.

The constitution entered into force on 1 August 1848, with a new government under the former governor, Gaspard-Théodore-Ignace de la Fontaine, taking office until elections could be held to the first Chamber of Deputies. These were held on 28 September 1848. The Chamber took session on 3 October, and a new, permanent government, under Jean-Jacques Willmar, took office on 8 December 1848, completing the promulgation of the constitution.

== See also ==
- Revolution of 1848 in Luxembourg
- List of members of the Constituent Assembly of Luxembourg
