= Gaspard-Théodore-Ignace de la Fontaine =

Luxembourgish politician and jurist (1787–1871)

G.T.I. de la Fontaine
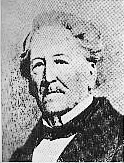

Prime Minister of Luxembourg
- In office 1 August 1848 – 6 December 1848
- Monarch: William II
- Preceded by: Position Established
- Succeeded by: Jean-Jacques Willmar

Personal details
- Born: 6 January 1787 Luxembourg, Austrian Netherlands
- Died: 11 February 1871 (aged 84) Luxembourg, Luxembourg
- Party: Independent

Gaspard-Théodore-Ignace de la Fontaine (French pronunciation: [ɡaspaʁ teɔdɔʁ iɲas də la fɔ̃tɛn]; 6 January 1787 – 11 February 1871) was a Luxembourgish politician and jurist. He led the Orangist movement and was the first prime minister of Luxembourg, serving for four months, from 1 August 1848 until 6 December of the same year.

From 1807 to 1810 he studied law in Paris and in the same year became a lawyer in Luxembourg City. In 1816 he became a member of the États provinciaux. When the Belgian Revolution broke out, he supported William I, and was appointed to the government commission that controlled Luxembourg City.

From 1841 to 1848 he was the governor of the Grand-Duchy. On 1 August 1848 he became the first head of government of Luxembourg and was also responsible for the areas of foreign affairs, justice, and culture. The government fell on 2 December 1849. De la Fontaine was from 1849 to 1851 a member of the council of Luxembourg City. In 1857 he was appointed the first president of the newly established Council of State, which he remained for 11 years.

His third son, Edmond, better known by his pen name 'Dicks', became Luxembourg's national poet, and one of the fathers of Luxembourgish literature. His two other sons were the botanist Léon de la Fontaine and the zoologist Alphonse de la Fontaine.

== Honours ==
- Knight of the Order of the Netherlands Lion
- Grand Cross of the Order of the Oak Crown
- Commander of the Order of Leopold

== See also ==
- Fontaine Ministry

== Notes ==
Political offices
New title Constitution amended	Prime Minister of Luxembourg; 1848	Succeeded by Jean-Jacques Willmar
New title Constitution amended	Administrator-General for Foreign Affairs; 1848	Succeeded by Jean-Jacques Willmar
New title Constitution amended	Administrator-General for Justice; 1848	Succeeded by Jean-Jacques Willmar
New title Council of State created	President of the Council of State; 1857–1868	Succeeded by Charles-Mathias Simons
