= King-Grand Duke =

The designation of King-Grand Duke was held by the three monarchs of the House of Orange-Nassau that ruled Luxembourg and the Netherlands in personal union, between 1815 and 1890. These monarchs thus held the titles of King of the Netherlands and Grand Duke of Luxembourg concurrently, and, although not strictly a title in its own right, that of 'King-Grand Duke' was used in legislation and official documents in Luxembourg throughout the period.

The three King-Grand Dukes were:

- William I (15 March 1815 – 7 October 1840)
- William II (7 October 1840 – 17 March 1849)
- William III (17 March 1849 – 23 November 1890)

The titles separated in 1890. Under the Nassau Family Pact of 1783, all 'German' lands, including the Grand Duchy of Luxembourg, were to be inherited by Salic law, whereas all non-German lands were unaffected. Thus, when Wilhelmina inherited the Dutch crown on the death of her father, William III, she was precluded from inheriting the crown of Luxembourg. Hence, it was inherited by Adolphe, formerly Duke of Nassau, parting the titles and ending the period of the King-Grand Dukes.

== See also ==
- King-Emperor
