= Action féminine =

The Action féminine was a women's organization in Luxembourg, founded in 1924. It was the first national women's organization in Luxembourg.

== History ==
The women's movement in Luxembourg started in 1906 with the foundation of the liberal Association for Women's Interests (Verein für die Interessen der Frau/ Association pour la Défense des Intérêts de la Femme) under Aline Mayrisch de Saint-Hubert, and the conservative Luxembourg Catholic Women's League (Luxemburger Katolische Frauenbund/Alliance des Femmes Luxembourgeoises), but there was no national women's organization.

The Action féminine was founded by Catherine Schleimer-Kill in 1924. It became a part of the International Council of Women in 1926. From 1927, it issued its own paper with the same name.

The purpose of the organization was to improve the rights of women in the civil code. Though women's suffrage was introduced in 1919 without any organized activism, married women were still subject to their husband's guardianship. The organization became successful, with local branches all over Luxembourg.

During the 1920s, the women's movement saw many improvements for women in Luxembourg, although these were less about legal reforms but rather about new professions opening up to women through individual precedence cases: Marcelle Dauphin becomes Luxembourg's first practising dentist in 1922, Louise Welter first female GP in 1923, Lory Koster the first female athlete to represent Luxembourg at the Olympic Games in 1924, and Netty Probst being approved as a lawyer in 1927.

In the municipal election of 1928, Action féminine presented a list of female candidates, and Schleimer-Kill was elected to the municipal council of Esch-sur-Alzette for the party, serving there until 1934.

The women's movement in Luxembourg was interrupted during the war, but re-emerged and formed many new organizations in the late 1940s. However, it was not until the 1960s that actual legal reforms regarding the position of women took place in Luxembourg. In 1967, equal pay for equal work was introduced followed by co-education in 1968, and in 1972–1974, the marriage law was finally reformed and married women were freed from the legal guardianship of their husband. In 1981 came a law against gender discrimination.
