= Brasseur family =

The Brasseur family is a family in Luxembourg that was prominent in politics and industry in the late nineteenth and early twentieth centuries. The head of the household was Alexis Brasseur, who had thirteen children by two wives. This second generation included Dominique Brasseur, a liberal Mayor of Luxembourg City and Pierre Brasseur, who was a prominent mining magnate in southern Luxembourg.

Pierre married the daughter of former minister François-Xavier Wurth-Paquet, and had five children, including Xavier Brasseur, a Socialist member of the Chamber of Deputies. Xavier married Jeane de Saint-Hubert, sister of Aline Mayrisch de Saint-Hubert - wife of Arbed President Émile Mayrisch.

Dominique married Constance Brasseur, his half-niece by Alexis's son Jean-Baptiste, and they had six children, including Robert Brasseur, who was a notable Liberal League deputy, and the playwright and composer Alexis Brasseur. The cousins Xavier and Robert became political rivals, representing different factions. Furthermore, Jeanne divorced Xavier in 1910, and married Robert in 1914, two years after her ex-husband had died.

== Family tree ==
Below is a partial family tree, showing some of the most prominent family members. People have the surname Brasseur unless stated otherwise.
