= Alexis Brasseur =

Alexis 'Lexi' Brasseur (26 December 1860 – 3 November 1924) was a Luxembourgish playwright, composer, and metallurgist.

== Biography ==
Born in Luxembourg City as the oldest son of Dominique Brasseur, Brasseur attended the Athénée de Luxembourg. He followed this by studying law at the University of Bonn, where he met Batty Weber. Brasseur received his doctorate in Luxembourg in 1886, and was called to the bar, but showed little interest in working in the law. He turned to metallurgy, like his father and uncle Pierre.

In 1894, he wrote a comedy with Batty Weber called De Monoonk Phëlpp. In 1907, he moved to Paris, staying there for four years. Brasseur died in Luxembourg City on 3 November 1924.

Alexis Brasseur was a member of the prominent Brasseur family. His father, Dominique, was a deputy (1866 – 99) and mayor of Luxembourg City (1891 – 94). His brother, Robert, was a deputy and founded the Liberal League. Alexis Brasseur married Jeanne Bian (1869–1960), sister of the liberal deputy Félix Bian and industrialist Émile Bian. They had three children.
