= Xavier Brasseur =

Luxembourgish politician (1865–1912)

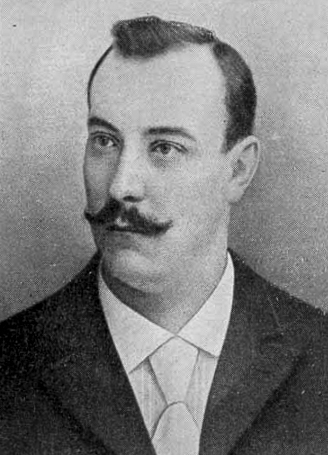

Member of the Chamber of Deputies
- In office 1902–1912

Personal details
- Born: François Xavier Brasseur; 19 October 1865
- Died: 4 July 1912 (aged 46)
- Party: LSAP
- Spouse: Jeanne de Saint-Hubert (m. 1893; div. 1910)
- Parent: Pierre Brasseur (father)
- Relatives: Brasseur family
- Education: Athénée de Luxembourg

François Xavier Brasseur (19 October 1865 – 4 July 1912) was a Luxembourgish politician and jurist.

Brasseur was educated at the Athénée de Luxembourg, graduating in 1884. Afterwards, he studied law, graduating on 17 June 1890, and began practising in 1894. He worked for his uncle Alexis's steelworks as legal counsel. On 5 January 1897, Brasseur stood as the liberal candidate against the socialist Michel Welter in partial elections in Esch-sur-Alzette.

After the Socialist Party was founded in 1902, Brasseur joined them, and stood in the elections of 7 April 1902 in Esch as a 'democratic' candidate, being elected to the Chamber (along with Welter and three other Socialist candidates). Brasseur consistently introduced legislation expanding Esch's prestige in the country, including the creation of a new district tribunal in Esch (along with those in Luxembourg City and Diekirch) and the creation of an industrial school in the town; both were defeated. More successful was his effort to create a tramway in Esch, which was passed, but only after his death. In 1908, the Socialists and the Liberal League formed their famous 'Left Bloc' (French: Bloc des Gauches), and Brasseur was returned as a deputy again, with seven other socialists.

His political involvement wasn't limited to Esch. Brasseur, as one of the most prominent socialists in the country, was appointed to run for, and was elected to, the communal council of Luxembourg City, along with Jean-Pierre Probst and Luc Housse, in 1904. Despite his commitment to Esch's development and his attack on the succession of Marie-Adélaïde to the grand duchy, Brasseur's main political preoccupation was with the introduction of universal suffrage and the promotion of education for girls. In this, he was influenced by his wife, Jeanne de Saint-Hubert (sister of Aline Mayrisch de Saint-Hubert), whom he had married on 25 May 1893 and divorced on 17 December 1910.

Xavier was a member of the prominent Brasseur family. His father, Pierre, was a famous industrialist. His uncle, Dominique, was a deputy (1866 – 99) and mayor of Luxembourg City (1891 – 94). Dominique's son, and Xavier's cousin, Robert, was a Liberal deputy and member of Luxembourg City's council at the same time as Xavier (and until 1925). In 1914, Robert married Jeanne, whom the late Xavier had divorced four years previously.
