= Dominique Brasseur =

Luxembourgish politician and jurist

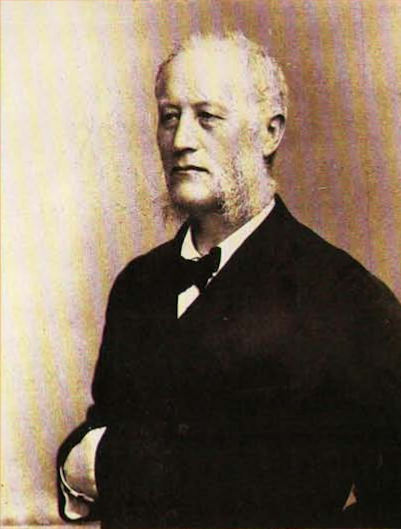
Undated portrait of Brasseur

Dominique Alexis Brasseur-Brasseur (14 June 1833 – 17 October 1906) was a Luxembourgish politician and jurist. He served as Mayor of Luxembourg City between 1891 and 1894.

Brasseur was educated at the Athénée, graduating in 1853, before studying law at Heidelberg and Ghent. Receiving his degree on 11 October 1858, he was called to the bar on 17 October 1861. He founded, with Léon Lamort-Pescatore, the Societé des Hauts-Fourneaux de Luxembourg, of which he took full control upon Pescatore's death in 1872. Two years later, Brasseur moved into a large house on rue du St-Esprit, where he would live for the rest of his life and where he would eventually die.

Brasseur was elected to the Chamber of Deputies in 1866, representing the canton of Esch-sur-Alzette. He would represent Esch until 1890, whereupon he began representing Luxembourg City, which he continued to do until his retirement from politics in 1899. He immediately made an impression, joining the attack on the government of Victor de Tornaco on 13 November 1867 for the military reforms post- the Treaty of London: an attack that would lead to the conservative government's downfall.

Due in part to Brasseur's role in the downfall of Tornaco's government, the new Prime Minister, Emmanuel Servais, appointed Brasseur as a member of the nine-man committee responsible for reorganising the armed forces. He was simultaneously also a member of the committee charged with reviewing the Constitution, which led to the adoption of the current constitution in 1868. Brasseur was also committed to the issue of railways and argued, along with Norbert Metz and Charles Simonis, against the formation of a National Bank. He was, as would his entire family be, a steadfast supporter of secularism and anti-clericalism.

Brasseur entered the communal council of Luxembourg City in 1890, and was named Mayor on 27 January 1891. He held the office until his replacement by Émile Mousel on 24 February 1894.

Dominique was a member of the prominent Brasseur family. Dominique's son, Robert, would later become a deputy and found the Liberal League; another son, Alexis, became a composer. His brother, Pierre, was a mining industrialist. Pierre's son, and Dominique's nephew, Xavier, was a Socialist deputy and member of Luxembourg City's council. His double-barrelled surname is on account of having married his half-niece, Constance Brasseur (by his father's first marriage), whom he wed on 9 February 1860 in Liège.

== Footnotes ==
Political offices
Preceded by Emmanuel Servais	Mayor of Luxembourg City; 1891 – 1894	Succeeded by Émile Mousel
