= Colpach Castle =

Castle in Colpach-Bas, Luxembourg

Coordinates: 49°45′28″N 5°49′32″E

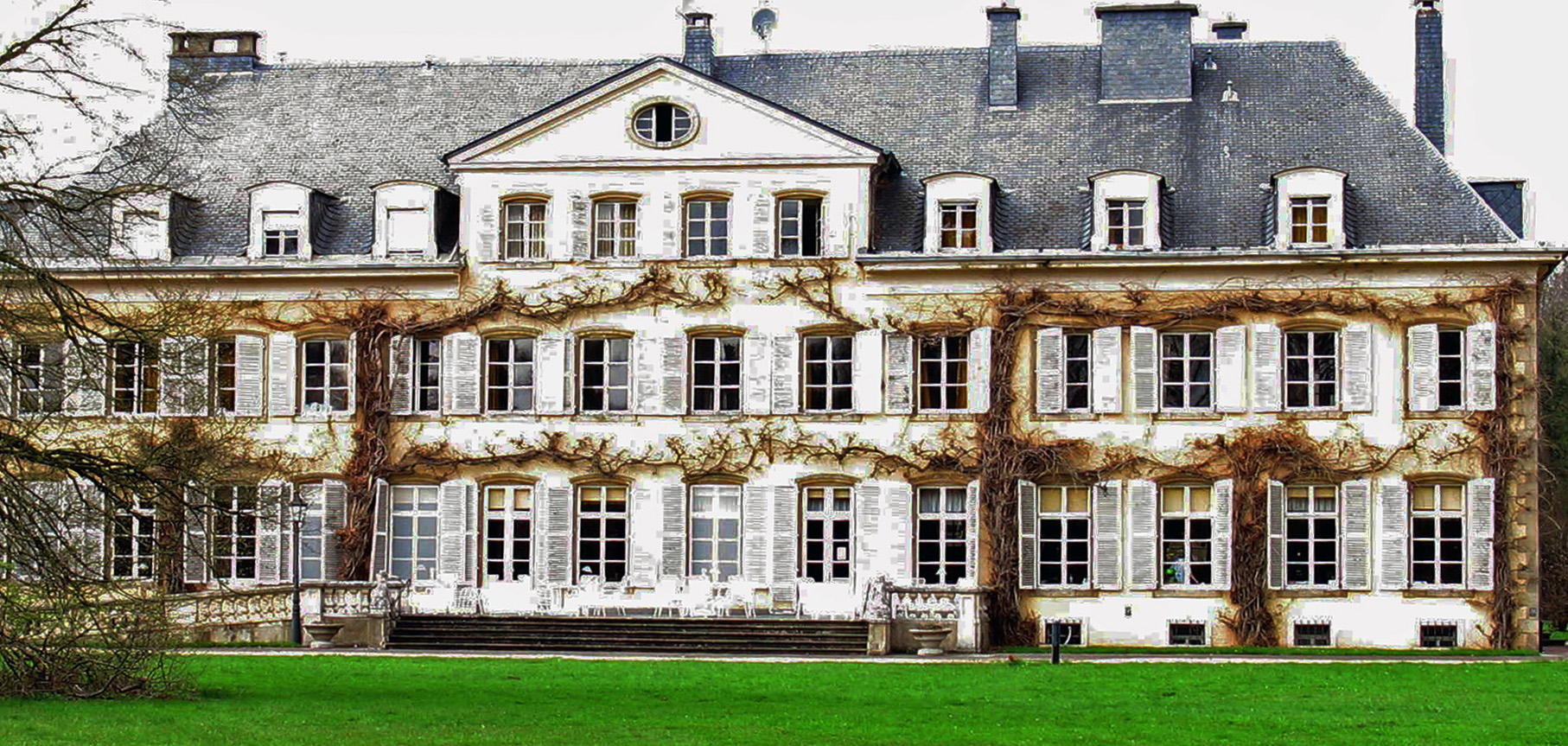
Colpach Castle

Colpach Castle (Luxembourgish: Schlass Kolpech; French: Château de Colpach), located in Colpach-Bas near Ell in western Luxembourg, dates from the beginning of the 14th century when it was a stronghold. It was adapted as a manor house in the 18th century. Today it is a 60-bed medical facility for post-oncological and physical rehabilitation owned and operated by the Red Cross via its Fondation Emile Mayrisch.

== History ==
The castle was originally a small medieval stronghold surrounded by a moat, similar to the castles at Ell and Everlange. The earliest reference dates from 1303. From 1628, it belonged to the Pforzheims who filled in the moat and converted it into a modest manor house around 1747 (the date on the entrance gate). In the 19th century, it was administered as a farming centre by Baron Edouard de Marches who lived in Guirsch Castle near Arlon. In about 1870, he laid out the gardens surrounding the castle. The lake with an island, the curved pathways, the ornamental bushes and trees can still be seen today. In 1874, his widow née Cécile Papier married the famous Hungarian painter Michael Munkácsy. They spent their summers in Colpach Castle and the winters in Paris. In 1886, Franz Liszt visited the couple in Colpach shortly before his death. After 1900, the castle was increasingly deserted by Munkácsy's widow who died in 1915.

Émile Mayrisch, head of ARBED, bought the castle and surrounding area on 27 January 1917. From 1917 to 1920, he had the castle enlarged and modified by the architect Sosthène Weis, lending it a simple but elegant style. Together with his wife Aline, Mayrisch made the castle a centre of attraction for noteworthy politicians, economists, writers and artists between the two world wars. Guests included Walther Rathenau, André Gide, Jacques Rivière, Otto Bartning and Théo van Rysselberghe.

In 1947, Aline Mayrisch bequeathed the castle to the Red Cross for use as a convalescent home. The facilities have been constantly improved over the years.

== The castle today ==
The property has been listed as a national monument since 2002. The park is open to visitors all the year round. It is particularly suitable for handicapped visitors.

== See also ==
- List of castles in Luxembourg
