= Gaston Diderich =

Luxembourgish politician (1884–1946)

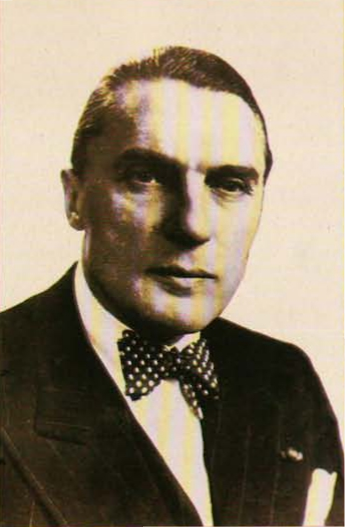
Undated portrait of Diderich

Gaston Diderich (18 June 1884 – 29 April 1946) was a Luxembourgish politician and jurist. He was the Mayor of Luxembourg City from 1921 until his death in 1946, making his the longest uninterrupted tenure in the city's history. In addition, Diderich was a member of the Chamber of Deputies from 1918 until 1940, and again from 1945 until his death the following year.

Diderich started political life in the Liberal League, of which he was on the progressive wing. After the German occupation during the First World War, the Liberal League found itself in opposition for the first time and suffered ideological divisions. Diderich, being Mayor of Luxembourg City, took the role of leading the left wing of the party, opposed to the leadership of the classical liberal Robert Brasseur,who had founded the party in 1904. The left-wing eventually triumphed, but only at the price of collapsing the party. The main party of the party, predominantly the left wing, reformed as the Radical Socialist Party,. under Diderich's leadership.

== Footnotes ==
Political offices
Preceded by Luc Housse	Mayor of Luxembourg City; 1921–1946	Succeeded by Émile Hamilius
