= Curvers =

Curvers is a surname. Notable people with the surname include:

- Alexis Curvers (1906-1992), French-speaking Belgian writer
- Roy Curvers (born 1979), Dutch cyclist
