= Association for Women's Interests =

The Association for Women's Interests (German: Verein für die Interessen der Frau; French: Association pour la Défense des Intérêts de la Femme) was a women's organization in Luxembourg, founded on 14 January 1906. It was the first women's organization in Luxembourg.

== History ==
The women's movement in Luxembourg started in 1906 with the foundation of the liberal Association for Women's Interests (Verein für die Interessen der Frau/ Association pour la Défense des Intérêts de la Femme) and the conservative Luxembourg Catholic Women's League (Luxemburger Katolische Frauenbund/Alliance des Femmes Luxembourgeoises).

The women's movement started late in Luxembourg, where education was low, the modern political system developed late and the conservative Catholic church was dominant. A speech in favor of women's rights by Käthe Schirmacher in December 1905 prompted a women's movement to form in Luxembourg, which was immediately split in two. The Association for Women's Interests was founded by liberal women, with Aline Mayrisch de Saint-Hubert as chair and Eugenie Heintz and Alice Crocius as secretaries. Saint-Hubert offered the patronage to Hereditary Grand Duchess Marie-Adelaide, but she declined, as a Roman Catholic feminist organisation was due to be set up; the conservative Luxembourg Catholic Women's League (Luxemburger Katolische Frauenbund/Alliance des Femmes Luxembourgeoises) was founded in July 1906.

In 1906, the Social Democrats (SDP) were the first to suggest women's suffrage in Luxembourg, but the women's movement declined to engage in the issue. The Association did not wish to be associated with a specific political party such as the socialists, and the Catholic League did not fully support such a reform, and ultimately, while Marguerite Mongenast-Servais and Marguerite Thomas-Clement spoke publicly in favor of the reform, there was no organized women's suffrage movement in Luxembourg.

The Association for Women's Interests focused on issues other than the vote, primarily access to education for women. In 1909, the Association formed a sub-branch called Association pour la création d'un lycée de jeunes filles to work exclusively on this issue. It was given permission to found a state girls' secondary school as a trial project by the government in 1909. When this met with success, the government was convinced that women should be allowed higher education. Thus, in 1911, the organization achieved significant success when the first secondary state schools for girls were opened, in Limpertsberg and Esch-sur-Alzette. Although the schools did not offer the same curriculum as the boys' schools, they were nevertheless the first step to give women the same education as men in Luxembourg.

Women's suffrage was introduced without the participation of the women's movement in 1919. However, married women still remained under the guardianship of their husband, and in 1924, the first national organization in Luxembourg, the Action féminine, was organized to fight actively for women's rights.
