= Mongenast =

Mongenast is a surname. Notable people with the surname include:

- Marguerite Mongenast-Servais (1885–1925), Luxembourgian women's rights activist.
- Mathias Mongenast (1843–1926), Luxembourgian politician.
