= Cécile Papier =

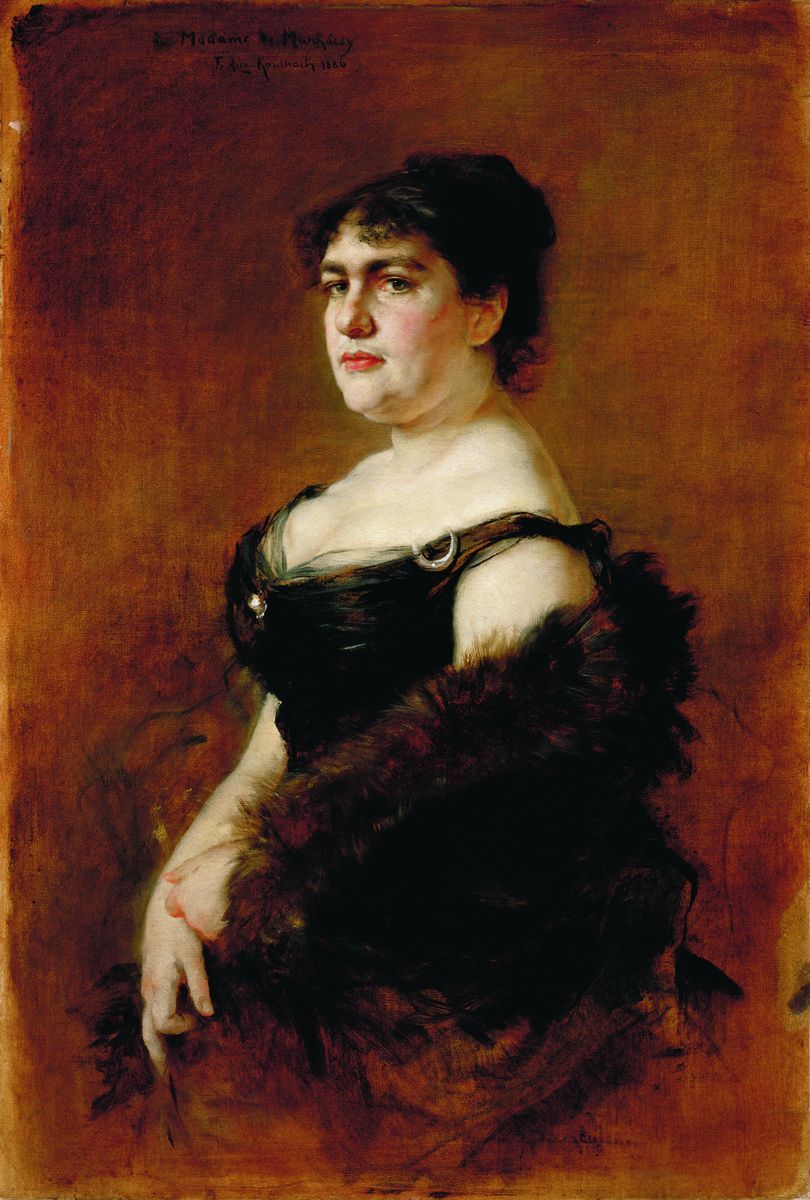
- Friedrich August von Kaulbach, Cecile Papier (1886)
- Born: Marie-Anne-Cécile Papier; 5 May 1845; Luxembourg City, Luxembourg
- Died: 8 March 1915 (aged 69); Luxembourg City, Luxembourg
- Spouse: Baron Henri-Édouard de Marches (1865–1873; his death) Mihály Munkácsy (1875–1900; his death)

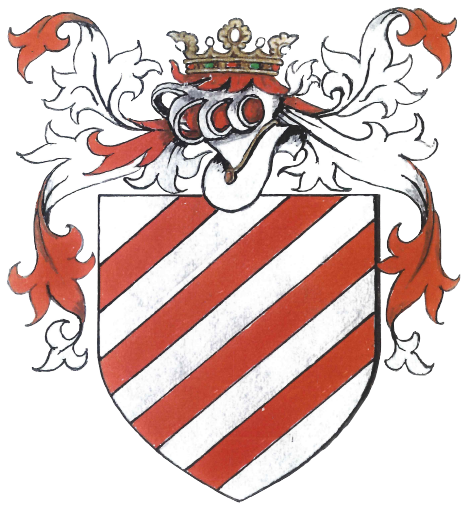
Cécile Papier's parental Arms Argent four bendlets sinister gules, barred helmet crowned

Cécile Papier (5 May 1845 – 8 March 1915) was a Luxembourgish socialite of the Belle Époque.

== Biography ==
Cécile Papier was born in Luxembourg City, the daughter of Charles-Ernest Papier and his wife Margueritte Valerius on her father's side she was descended from a long line of ironmasters managing a great number of forges in the Duchy of Luxembourg and Grand Duchy of Luxembourg, and this from the early 17th century on. During her first marriage to Henri Edouard, baron de Marches, the couple resided in Colpach Castle and their Paris hôtel particulier. They travelled extensively abroad and sponsored promising young artists, among them Mihály Munkácsy a talented Hungarian painter.

After her first husband's premature death she married Mihály Munkácsy who was to become one of the greatest Hungarian painters renowned for his genre pictures and large-scale biblical paintings. The guest lists of people attending their social events both in Luxembourg and Paris read like the who is who of the Belle Époque. Among their distinguished guests we find her relatives, the Brasseur-Bian, Luxembourg steel magnates, and members of the Luxembourg government like the Prime Minister Paul Eyschen. Among the international personalities we should highlight the musicians and composers Franz Liszt who gave his last piano recital in Luxembourg, Anton Rubinstein, Charles Gounod, Jules Massenet, Charles-Marie Widor, Ignacy Jan Paderewski (later President of Poland), Jules Massenet, Camille Saint-Saëns and most probably Richard Wagner and not to forget Sir Alexander Campbell Mackenzie, Knight Commander of the Royal Victorian Order. Among the politicians we should point out Raymond Poincaré, President and Prime Minister of France, members of the diplomatic corps like the count Frédéric de Pourtalès and the rocambolesque Camille Armand Jules Marie, Prince de Polignac. Among the writers, Anatole France, Alphonse Daudet, Alexandre Dumas fils, Emile Zola and many more. Among the big industrialists, Ferdinand de Lesseps, constructor of the Suez canal, and the magnate of journalism Joseph Pulitzer and the journalist Édouard Hervé.
