= Esch-sur-Alzette (Chamber of Deputies of Luxembourg constituency) =

- Former constituency for the Chamber of Deputies
- Canton: Esch-sur-Alzette

Former constituency
- Created: 1848
- Abolished: 1919
- Deputies: List: Dominique Brasseur (1866–1890); Léon Metz (1875–1918); Xavier Brasseur (1902–1912)
- Replaced by: South

The constituency Esch-sur-Alzette elected members to Luxembourg's national legislature, the Chamber of Deputies, from 1848 until its abolition in 1919. It was coterminous with the canton of Esch-sur-Alzette, in the south of the country.

After its abolition, it was replaced by Sud, which also included the canton of Capellen.

Members elected to represent Esch-sur-Alzette include Dominique Brasseur (1866–90), Xavier Brasseur (1902–12), and Léon Metz (1875–1918).
