= Marguerite Mongenast-Servais =

Luxembourgish women's rights activist (1885–1925)

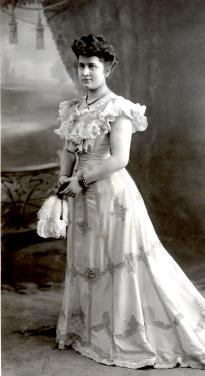
M. Mongenast-Srvais by Charles Bernhoeft.

Marguerite Mongenast-Servais (1885–1925), was a Luxembourgish women's rights activist.

She was married to the engineer Paul Mongenast. She was engaged in several progressive associations, among them the anti-monarchist "Action républicaine".

She was also a member of the women's rights organization "Organisation pour les Intérêts de la femme". There was never any organized women's suffrage movement in Luxembourg: women suffrage was introduced in 1919 without any debate, as a part of the project of the new democratic constitution, and the women's rights organizations mainly focused on educational opportunities. However, in 1917–1919, Marguerite Thomas-Clement belonged to the few who spoke in favour of women suffrage in public debates through articles in the press.
