= Alphonse Munchen =

Luxembourgish engineer and politician (1850–1917)

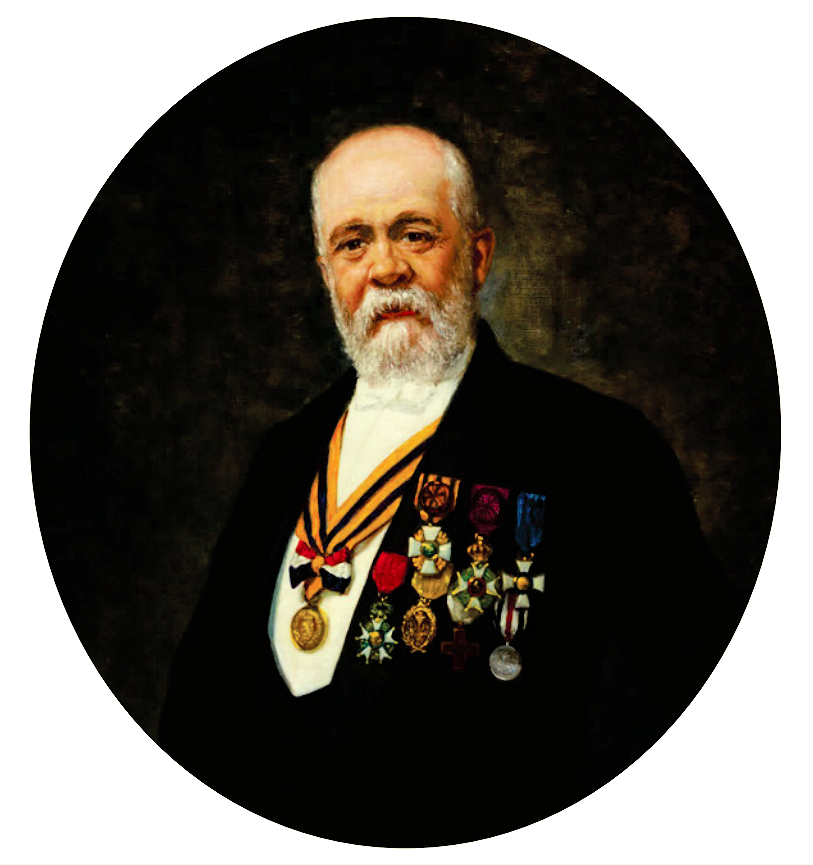
Portrait of Alphonse Munchen (1850-1917)

Jean-Pierre Alphonse Munchen (3 September 1850 – 25 January 1917) was a Luxembourgish engineer and politician. He served as the Mayor of Luxembourg City between 24 July 1904 and 14 February 1915.

Munchen was born into one of Luxembourg's best-established families in Diekirch on 3 September 1850. He was the son of Franz Karl (François-Charles) Munchen, the lawyer's bâtonnier of the Luxembourg court and owner of Castle Grevels. On 4 July 1861, his sister Eleonore "Laure" Wilhelmine Munchen (1842–1895) married Prussian General Konstanz Bernhard von Voigts-Rhetz.

He studied at University of Liège, after which he became an industrial engineer, working in both Belgium and Luxembourg in the burgeoning local steel industry. Munchen was involved in the foundation of the steel mill at Rodange, and in the development of the Prince Henri Railway. After this, he spent many years working in the Russian Empire, particularly the Urals and Siberia, where he helped to develop the areas' first steel infrastructure.

In 1892, he entered Luxembourg City's communal council, in which he served until 1904, when he became the city's mayor. He also represented the city in the national legislature, the Chamber of Deputies.

There is a street in Merl, Luxembourg City, named after Munchen (Rue Alphonse Munchen).

== Footnotes ==
Political offices
Preceded by Émile Mousel	Mayor of Luxembourg City; 1904–1914	Succeeded by Léandre Lacroix
