= Léandre Lacroix =

Luxembourgish politician (1859–1935)

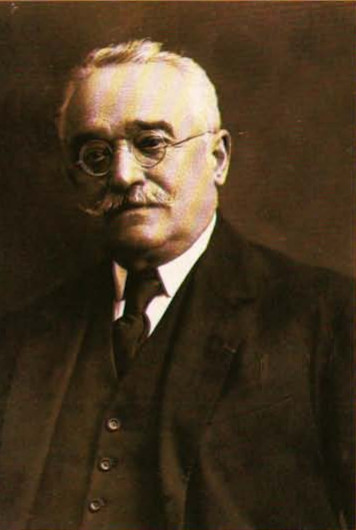
Undated portrait of Lacroix

Léandre Lacroix (1 January 1859 – 28 March 1935) was a Luxembourgish politician and jurist. He served as the Mayor of Luxembourg City between 1914 and 1918. He was chosen by Grand Duchess Marie-Adelaide over his socialist rival Luc Housse, who would eventually succeed him in 1918.

Rue Léandre Lacroix is a street in Limpertsberg, Luxembourg City, named after him.

Political offices
Preceded by Alphonse Munchen	Mayor of Luxembourg City; 1914–1918	Succeeded by Luc Housse
