= Pierre Brasseur (Luxembourg) =

Luxembourgish entrepreneur

- Born: January 21, 1832; Esch-sur-Alzette, Luxembourg
- Died: February 7, 1918; Luxembourg
- Occupations: Entrepreneur,businessman, mining magnate
- Known for: Founding industrial companies that became ARBED and later ArcelorMittal
- Spouse: Hélène Wurth
- Children: Xavier Brasseur
- Relatives: Dominique Brasseur (brother), Robert Brasseur (nephew)

Pierre Brasseur (21 January 1832 – 7 February 1918) was a Luxembourgish entrepreneur, businessman, and mining magnate, being involved in founding a number of industrial concerns in southern Luxembourg. Amongst them was one of the steel companies that would become ARBED, and, after many mergers and consolidations, Arcelor Mittal.

== Early life ==
Pierre was a member of the Brasseur family, born the eleventh son of Alexis Brasseur in Esch-sur-Alzette.

== Career ==
Along with a number of other associates, Pierre founded the Society for the Extraction of Minerals of the Grand Duchy of Luxembourg (French: Société pour l'Exploitation des Minières du Grand-Duché de Luxembourg). in 1861. The following year, he was awarded a concession to mine an area of 77 hectares (0.30 sq mi) near Rumelange, in Luxembourg's Red Lands. He was appointed notary in Esch-sur-Alzette in 1864.

His success allowed him to establish in 1870 the Society of Blast Furnaces of Luxembourg (French: S.A. des Hauts Fourneaux Luxembourgeois), along with twenty-six other subscribers. He was one of the members of the first administrative council of the company, which directed the company until 1874. The company opened two blast furnaces in Esch in 1872 and 1873. In about 1874, he left the administrative council. However, his name would forever be attached to the furnaces in Esch. After mergers with German operations, and expansion in Esch-sur-Alzette and into Alsace-Lorraine, the company would become the second-largest industrial business in the Zollverein (after Krupp). In 1920, the firm would become ARBED, which would form a major part of Arcelor Mittal, the world's largest steel-maker.

In 1875, he was appointed notary in Differdange. Brasseur was appointed director of mines in Dudelange, which were to become the Society of Blast Furnaces and Forges of Dudelange. In 1894, he founded the first cement company in Luxembourg, at Rumelange, which became the Society of Blast Furnaces of Rumelange in 1897.

He died on 7 February 1918.

== Personal life ==
On 17 November 1864, he married Hélène Wurth, daughter of François-Xavier Wurth-Paquet, who had been a famous Luxembourgish politician and Administrator-General for Luxembourg. Pierre's family played a key role in politics itself. His son, Xavier, was a Socialist member of the Chamber of Deputies (1902–12). Pierre's younger brother, Dominique, was also a deputy (1866–99) and mayor of Luxembourg City (1891–94). Dominique's son, and Pierre's nephew, Robert, was a deputy (1899–1925) and founder of the Liberal League.
