= Émile Mousel =

Luxembourgish politician (1843–1910)

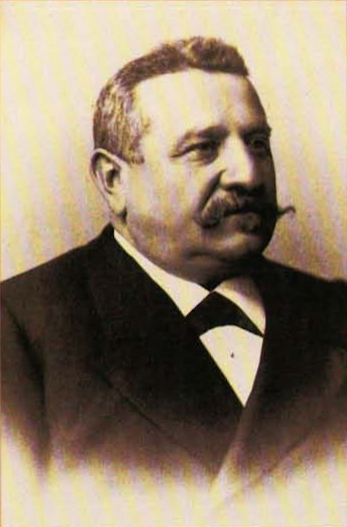
Undated portrait of Mousel

Émile Mousel (20 December 1843 – 15 October 1910) was a Luxembourgish politician and brewer. Mousel came from the famous Mousel family of brewers, and was mayor of Luxembourg City from 24 February 1894 until 24 July 1904.

Political offices
Preceded by Dominique Brasseur	Mayor of Luxembourg City; 1894–1904	Succeeded by Alphonse Munchen
