= Catherine Schleimer-Kill =

Luxembourgish women's rights activist

- Born: Catherine Kill; 1884
- Died: 1973 (aged 88–89)
- Education: Lehrerinnen-Normalschule
- Occupation: Suffragist
- Known for: founder of Action féminine
- Spouse: Jean Schleimer (m. 1905)

Catherine Schleimer-Kill, née Kill (1884–1973), was a Luxembourgish suffragist and women's rights activist. She was founder and secretary of the Action féminine.

== Life ==
She was the daughter of a steelworker in Esch-sur-Alzette. She was educated as a teacher at the Lehrerinnen-Normalschule in Luxemburg. In 1905, she married her colleague Jean Schleimer. She was early on engaged in the Catholic party: when women's suffrage was introduced in 1919, she was the only female candidate of the party.

In 1924, she founded the women's rights organization Action féminine, which became a part of the International Council of Women in 1926 and from 1927 also issued its own paper with the same name, the first in Luxembourg. The purpose of the organization was to improve the rights of women in the civil code: though women's suffrage was introduced in 1919, married women were still minors subjugated to their husbands. The organization became successful, with local branches all over Luxembourg.

In the municipal election of 1928, Action féminine presented a list of all female candidates, and Schleimer-Kill was elected to the municipal council of Esch-sur-Alzette for the party, serving there until 1934.

== Sources ==
- Renée Wagener: "Catherine Schleimer-Kill und die Action féminine" (trans. Catherine Schleimer-Kill and the Action féminine), Wenn nun wir Frauen auch das Wort ergreifen... (Publications nationales, Lëtzebuerg, 1997).
