= Jean-Bernard Knepper =

Jean-Bernard Knepper (1638 – 14 November 1698) was a Luxembourgish advocat and notary, who from 1693 to 1698 was the Mayor of the City of Luxembourg.

Knepper was the son of Dominique Knepper. He went to the University of Dole in Besançon, Burgundy, and studied law there. He was admitted to the Luxembourg bar on 24 May 1660. He became a judge by appointment of Louis XIV in 1687.

In 1661 he married Anna-Marguerite Trippel, the daughter of a shepherd from Thionville.

He eventually died on November 14, 1698.

== See also ==
- List of mayors of Luxembourg City
