= Emile Haag =

Luxembourgish historian

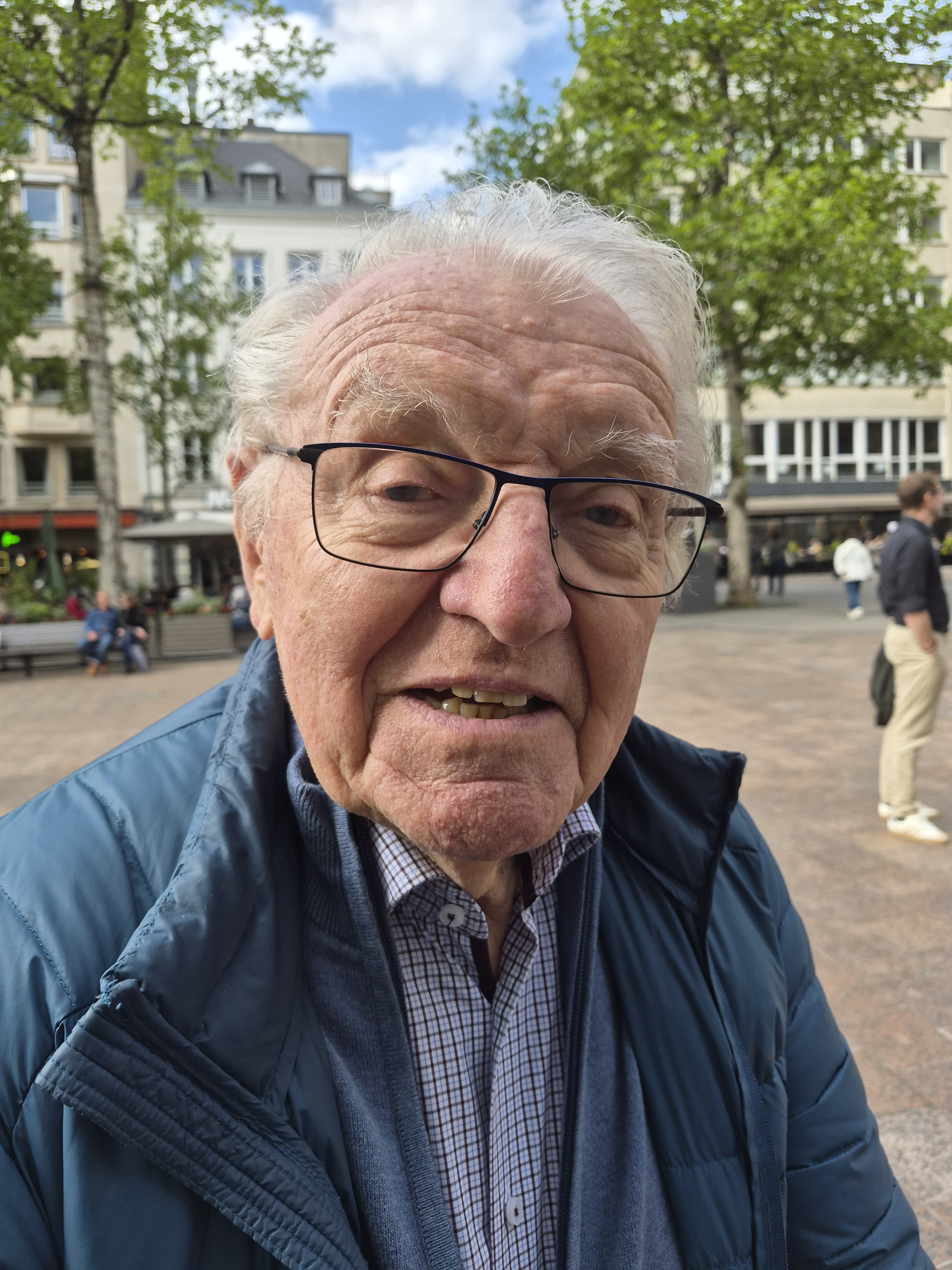
Haag in 2026

Emile Haag (born 24 July 1942) is a Luxembourgish historian, trade unionist and former principal of the Athénée de Luxembourg. From 1987 to 2016 he was the president of the General Confederation of Civil Servants, a Luxembourgish trade union. In 1997, he was made commander of the Ordre de la couronne de chêne (awarded 1997). Between 2005 and 2015 he was also President of the Chamber for Civil Servants and Government Employees. In 2015 he was made honorary president of that chamber.

== Biography ==
Emile Haag was born in Hunsdorf. After his secondary education at the Lycée classique de Diekirch, he went on to study history in Aix-en-Provence and Paris.

After completing his military service, he went on to pursue a Luxembourg doctorate (1968), through the system called "collation des grades", and became a teacher at the Athénée de Luxembourg. In 1981, he became deputy principal, and from 1993 until 2007 he was the principal of this school.

From 1969 on Haag also taught at the European branch of the Miami University Dolibois European Center (MUDEC) in Luxembourg. Between 1971 and 1973 he was also a guest lecturer at Miami University in the US-state of Ohio and received an award for outstanding teaching.

From 1973 until 1980, he was involved in research at the National archives of Luxembourg, and later taught Modern History at the University Centre of Luxembourg, predecessor of the University of Luxembourg (founded 2003).

In 2015, he published The Rise of Luxembourg from Independence to Success, a book chronicling Luxembourg's recent history.

Since 1978 he has been a corresponding member of the Historical section of the Grand Ducal Institute, and since 2008 he was the President of the Association for the historical heritage of Luxembourg, the << Union luxembourgeoise pour l'histoire et le patrimoine >> (ULHP).

== Bibliography ==
- Une réussite originale - Le Luxembourg au fil des siècles; Lëtzebuerg (Éditions Guy Binsfeld), 2011; 576 pages (ill.); ISBN 978-2-87954-235-5
- The Rise of Luxembourg from Independence to Success. 1815 - 2015 : A Historical Portrait - Two Hundred Years of modern Luxembourg History; Luxembourg (Editions Saint-Paul), 2015.
- Les gouvernements luxembourgeois face aux grandes crises 1867, 1919, 1940. In: Mémorial 1989 - La société luxembourgeoise de 1839 à 1989; Les Publications mosellanes, 1989; S. 144-155.
- (with Émile Krier: 1940 - L'année du dilemme. La Grande-Duchesse et son gouvernement pendant la Deuxième Guerre mondiale. Luxembourg : RTL-édition, 1987; Esch-sur-Alzette, Éditpress.
- Die Luxemburger Gesellschaft für deutsche Literatur und Kunst (Gedelit). In: Hémecht, Vol. 28 (1976), no. 1, p. 5-26; no. 2, p. 101-128; no. 3, p. 285-320; Vol. 29 (1977), no. 2, p. 133-171.
- Was wollte Bismarck mit der Luxemburger Affäre 1867 ? In: Hémecht, Vol. 23 (1971), no. 1, p. 43-58.
- Der Luxemburger Staat - der "eingebildete Kranke"; in: Télécran 02 / 2013; p. 34-35.
- <<La nationalité luxembourgeoise, épine dorsale de l'État>> - Émile Haag, président du [sic] CGFP, explique la position de son syndicat sur la question du droit de vote des étrangers et de la nationalité; in: Forum, Nr. 326, February 2013; pp. 38–40.
- <<La chance sourit à ceux qui la saisissent.>> - Petite flânerie dans les méandres du passé...; in: annALes de l'Athénée / d'annALe vum Staadter (sic) Kolléisch, 07/2013-2014; Lëtzebuerg (Drock: saint-paul luxembourg), Sept. 2014; pp. 366–371 (ill.). ISBN 978-99959-631-6-3

== Literature ==
- mt, "Man muss die Schule attraktiver gestalten" - Gespräch mit dem neuen Direktor des Athenäums, Prof. Émile Haag; in: Luxemburger Wort, 16 July 1993
- Margaret Ferns, International Baccalaureate in English at the Athénée de Luxembourg - Director Émile Haag explains reasoning and application; in: 352 Luxembourg News, Nr. 173, 29 March 2007; pp. 4–5
- Roland Houtsch, Wort-Gespräch mit Émile Haag : Lernen als persönliche intellektuelle Anstrengung - Der frühere Athénée-Direktor befindet sich in höchst aktivem Ruhestand ; in: Luxemburger Wort, 15 October 2007, p. 15
- Steve Heiliger, Kurzinterview - Eine Geschichte mit vielen Gesichtern - Anhand von Porträts namhafter Persönlichkeiten zeichnet CGFP-Nationalpräsident Émile Haag die Geschichte Luxemburgs auf eine originelle Weise auf; in: fonction publique, Nr. 217, October 2011; p. 6
- Jeff Baden, "Le Luxembourg - une réussite originale au fil des siècles" - Comment nous sommes devenus ce que nous voulons rester - Grouss Personnagen, wichteg Plazen an Epoche vu gëschter an haut; in: Die Warte / Perspectives, Nr. 35|2349, p. 2; cultural supplement of the Luxemburger Wort, 8 December 2011
- [?], Une autre histoire - Luxembourg (sic!), une réussite originale - Émile Haag livre une vision fascinée de l'histoire du pays; in: Le Jeudi, 15 December 2011.
- Renée Wagener, Histoire nationale - La riposte des Anciens archivéiert; in: woxx, Nr. 1142-1143, 23 December 2011; pp. 18–19.
- Max Lemmer, Führungswechsel - Wolff folgt auf Haag - Neuer Vorstand des Staatsbeamtenkammer gewählt; in: Luxemburger Wort, 30 June 2015.
