= Émile Mayrisch =

Luxembourgish industrialist and businessman (1862–1928)

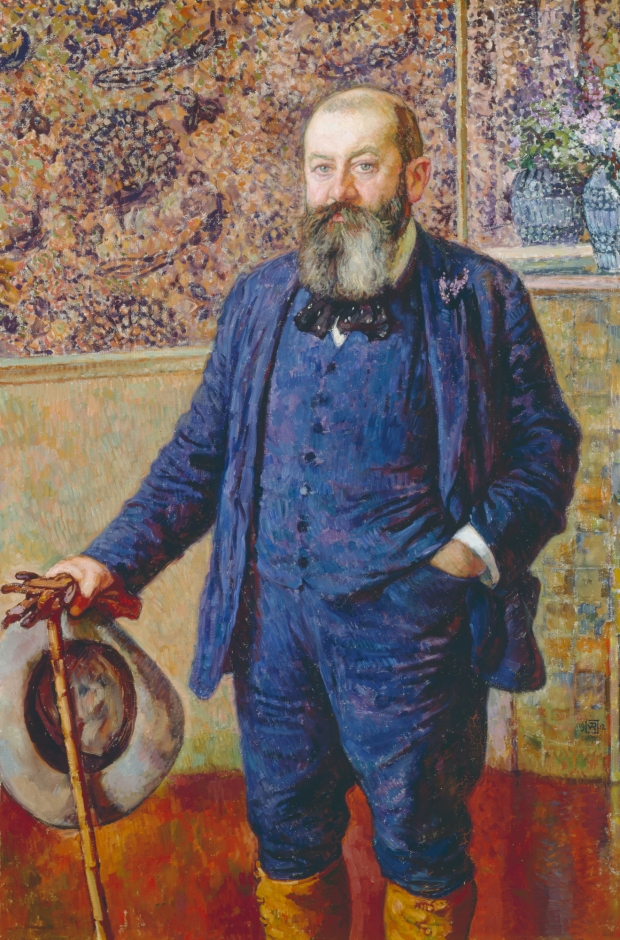
Portrait of Emile Mayrisch, by Théo van Rysselberghe

Jacob Émile Albert Mayrisch (10 October 1862 – 5 March 1928) was a Luxembourgish industrialist for steel and businessman. He served as president of Arbed.

He was married to Aline de Saint-Hubert, who was a famous women's rights campaigner, socialite and philanthropist, and was President of the Luxembourg Red Cross.

He died in a car accident at Châlons-sur-Marne, in France, in 1928.

== Life ==
Émile Mayrisch's father was Edouard Mayrisch, a doctor at court, and his mother was Mathilde Metz, the daughter of Adolf Metz, and niece of Norbert Metz, an industrialist at Eich and Dommeldange, and a government minister. He grew up in Eich, which was in those days the industrial centre of Luxembourg. For his secondary education, he attended the Athénée de Luxembourg and the Institut Rachez in Belgium. From 1881 to 1885 he studied at the Rheinisch-Westfälische Technische Hochschule in Aachen, without graduating, as he did not sit the exams. In those days, however, it was possible in Luxembourg to do engineering work, without having to have a diploma.

In 1885, he went to work in the Dudelange foundry, which had been founded three years previously by his great-uncle Norbert Metz. A year later, he went to Rodange, where he became head of production of the blast furnaces. On 1 February 1891 he went to Dudelange as an engineer-chemist, where he became head of the laboratory two months later. In July 1893 he became general secretary of the board of directors, and on 21 April 1897 was appointed director of the Dudelange foundry.

As such, he modernised and enlarged the foundry, made contracts with German suppliers and brought the foundry into the Stahlwerkverband. He also set new standards regarding the social well-being of his workers: health insurance for the workers, a retirement fund for the employees, paid holiday, an "Economat", where the workers could buy cheap groceries, etc.

In 1894 he married Aline de Saint-Hubert. The couple had two children: Jean (d. 1899) and Andrée (1901–1976).

In 1911, after long negotiations, Émile Mayrisch brought about a merger of the three largest Luxembourgish steelworks: ARBED (Aciéries Réunies de Burbach-Eich-Dudelange) was born, of which he became the technical director. Up until the war, he made ARBED one of the most important members of the Stahlverband.

In the war years of 1914–1918, Mayrisch had ARBED continue production (which also prevented massive unemployment), and thus supplied Germany with vital raw materials for wartime production. For this reason, the Dudelange foundry was bombarded in 1916/1918 by the Allies. Mayrisch also had a military hospital installed in his former villa for German and French soldiers.

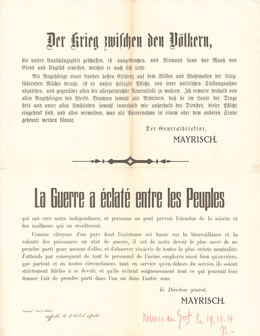
Mayrisch addressing the staff of his steel company ARBED on August 2nd, 1914

Germany violated Luxembourg's neutrality by occupying the country, which was a real shock for not only political concerns, but also to the business world. The country felt shaken in its foundations, referencing to the respect of international treaties to which it owed its existence. The war put Mayrisch to the test. He had three main tasks, namely to supply his factories with coal, to find railway carriages, as well as to provide his workers with supplies. He made frequent trips to the Ruhr area and to Berlin, the base of the decision-makers of the Foreign Office and the War Ministry. His good relations with the German employers served Luxembourg well. He ensured the supply of his workers by direct food purchases in Germany without passing the Luxembourg government purchasing office.

This not only portrayed the power and influence of ARBED, but also Mayrisch's ability to act on an international level. It also illustrated his concern for his workers. Economic calculations, political and social considerations, as well as humanitarian feelings formed an inextricable tangle in Mayrisch's mind.

A man of his stature could not fail to think about the future of his society, which was closely linked to the fate of the country. As a Luxembourger, he placed himself between the belligerents. As a responsible and far-sighted man, Mayrisch had to consider all eventualities. If Germany won the war, which during November/December 1914 was still a possibility, Luxembourg would remain in the German sphere and may even be annexed. ARBED, on the contrary, would lose nothing. Mayrisch had the confidence of the German circles, regarding political and business situations.

In 1918, with the ending of the Great War, the Grand Duchy was faced with some issues: the Allies pushed Luxembourg out of the Zollverein. The steel industry risked losing its main market and its direct access to Ruhr coal.

Towards the end of the war, he made contact with the French, and sent Jean Schlumberger, a writer and intelligence officer, a report on German wartime production.

After the war, Luxembourg left the Zollverein, and ARBED had to seek out new export markets. In 1919 Émile Mayrisch founded Terres Rouges together with Schneider-Creusot, against the resistance of ARBED's president, the Belgian Gaston Barbanson. Mayrisch soon became president of the board, and it was he who negotiated an agreement between the German, French, Belgian and Luxembourgish steel industry.

In 1920, the Mayrisch family moved to Colpach-Bas, where they had bought Colpach Castle. In the following years, this became an important meeting point for writers, artists, politicians, and economists of Europe could come together. The Colpach group included André Gide, Walther Rathenau, Jacques Rivière, Paul Claudel, Jean Guéhenno, Annette Kolb, Théo van Rysselberghe, Maria Van Rysselberghe, Karl Jaspers, Bernard Groethuysen, Ernst Robert Curtius and Richard von Coudenhove-Kalergi. Mayrisch's goal was to find a rapprochement between Germany and France.

On 30 September 1926, after long negotiations, the International Steel Agreement / Entente Internationale de l’Acier (EIA) was founded in Luxembourg, in which Luxembourg and neighbouring countries set quotas for their steel production. Émile Mayrisch became the president of this cartel.

In 1922 Mayrisch bought most of the shares in the liberal Luxemburger Zeitung, in which he could bring his ideas on German-French understanding to the fore. In addition, he founded the Comité Franco-Allemand d'Information et de Documentation (Deutsch-Französisches Studienkomitee) in 1926. This committee, with offices in Paris and Berlin, made an effort to combat misinformation that the two countries spread about each other.

In 1926, he was honoured by his alma mater, the RWTH in Aachen, and received an honorary doctorate.

He died in 1928 in a car accident, on his way to Paris for a meeting of the EIA.
