= François Scheffer =

Luxembourgish politician

François Scheffer (1 July 1766 – 9 September 1844) was a Luxembourgish politician. He served four stints as the Mayor of Luxembourg City, with a total tenure of twenty-one years.

There is a street in Limpertsberg, Luxembourg City, named after Scheffer (Allée Scheffer).

Political offices
Preceded by	Mayor of Luxembourg City; 1st time 1800–1802	Succeeded by Jean-Baptiste Servais
Preceded by Bonaventure Dutreux-Boch	Mayor of Luxembourg City; 2nd time 1816–1817	Succeeded by Constantin Joseph Pescatore
Preceded by Constantin Joseph Pescatore	Mayor of Luxembourg City; 3rd time 1820–1822	Succeeded by François Röser
Preceded by François Röser	Mayor of Luxembourg City; 4th time 1827–1843	Succeeded by Fernand Pescatore
