= Antoine Pescatore =

Constantin-Joseph-Antoine Pescatore, known as Antoine Pescatore, was born on 16 December 1787 in Luxembourg City, and died on 31 October 1858 in Sandweiler. He was a businessman and politician.

From 1817 to 1820, he was mayor of the city of Luxembourg.

From 1842 to 1848 he was a member of the Assembly of Estates, and from 1854 to 1856 was a member of the Chamber of Deputies.

In 1845 he became a founding member of the Société pour la recherche et la conservation des monuments historiques dans le Grand-Duché de Luxembourg.

His daughter Marie Pescatore (1819-1894) married Paul de Scherff.

Political offices
Preceded by François Scheffer	Mayor of Luxembourg City; 1817–1820	Succeeded by François Scheffer
