= Luxembourg Red Cross =

National Red Cross society of Luxembourg

- Croix-Rouge luxembourgeoise (in French), Luxemburgisches Rotes Kreuz (in German), Lëtzebuerger Rout Kräiz (in Luxembourgish)
- Formation: 1914
- Purpose: Humanitarian Aid
- Headquarters: Luxembourg City, Luxembourg
- Region served: Luxembourg
- President: Grand Duchess Maria Teresa
- Parent organization: International Federation of Red Cross and Red Crescent Societies
- Staff: 1,915 (2013)
- Volunteers: 15,000 (2013)
- Website: www.croix-rouge.lu

The Luxembourg Red Cross (Luxembourgish and French: Croix-Rouge luxembourgeoise, German: Luxemburgisches Rotes Kreuz) is the Luxembourg-based National Society of the International Red Cross and Red Crescent Movement. The society was established on 8 August 1914 by Émile and Aline Mayrisch. They persuaded the mayor of Luxembourg City, the commander-in-chief of the army and representatives of the three churches to sign the founding certificate. Its president is currently Grand Duchess Maria Teresa. Michel Simonis is the managing director.

The Grand Duchess was the guest of honour at an event to celebrate the 20th anniversary of the Luxembourg Red Cross Bazaar in Limpertsberg in November 2016.
