= International Steel Agreement =

The International Steel Agreement was an international steel cartel from 1926 to 1939. Its purpose was to sustain prices, and to equitably divide up quotas amongst member states and companies, which represented around two-thirds of the world's steel exports, as well as to secure the member states' supplies of iron ore and coke, which were indispensable to their steel industries. It faced difficulties due to Nazi Germany's desire to re-arm and increased British and American exports after the Wall Street crash of 1929.

The cartel was largely unsuccessfui in price fixing.

== Background ==
=== Economic context ===
At the beginning of the 20th century, German steel production was four times greater than that of France. While it was reduced to half its pre-war amount after the defeat of 1918, by 1929 it had once again attained its 1913 level. Meanwhile, France almost tripled its pre-war level, but still could not reach German levels. It was highly dependent on German coke: due to its low quality and carbon level, French coal (from the North and North-East) was only partly usable as coke, and coal from Lorraine was not usable at all.

The Germans had flooded the mine shafts of 18 out of 19 French mining companies during the war. The Allied occupation of the Rhineland after World War I was followed by the occupation of the Ruhr from 1923 to 1925, and the Dawes Plan of 16 August 1924 regulated German post-war reparations payments, which would henceforth be indexed to Germany's economic performance. In 1925, the Northern French mining basin once again reached its 1913 level, and the French grip on German coal was loosened.

The members of the cartel represented only 35% of total production, but two-thirds of worldwide steel product exports. The United States produced 47 million tons of steel in 1926, but only exported 2,3 million. Exports from the Ruhr (5,6 million tons of steel out of a total production of 16 million), were twice as high as exports from the United States, and a third of German production.

The world market was dominated by five big producer countries: the United States (47,4% of production in 1929), Germany (13,3%), the United Kingdom (8,3%), France (8%) and Belgium and Luxembourg collectively (5,6%) who altogether produced 83% of the world steel production of 122 million tons in 1929. Exports of steel products were only about a sixth of this total production, that is 20,5 million tons.

=== Political context ===
Since the 1920s, international cartel agreements had become numerous. Some European governments saw in them a first step towards closer economic cooperation between countries. In this spirit, the German chancellor Gustav Stresemann declared his wish that "other branches, without stopping at national borders, would follow the example of the steel industry".

Political cooperation saw a revival during this period due to the Locarno Treaties, signed on 16 October 1925 in Locarno: Germany officially renounced any modifications of its western (but not its eastern) border. This gained the trust of the French, who in 1926 declared themselves in favour of Germany joining the League of Nations.

=== Beginnings ===
German steel-makers founded the Rohstahlgemeinschaft ("crude steel company") in November 1924, a company that brought together all German steel producers and those of the Saarland.

Another precedent of the cartel was an agreement on 12 March 1926 between rail producers, the International Rail Makers Association (IRMA). Its members were Germany, Belgium, France and the United Kingdom. Disputes between the French and German governments during the negotiations over a trade agreement stalled the signing of a more general agreement on steel.

The creation of the cartel, after months-long negotiations, was driven by Fritz Thyssen, president of the Stahlwerksverband, Émile Mayrisch, Luxembourg's foremost industrialist and the main founder of ARBED (Aciéries réunies de Burbach-Eich-Dudelange) in 1911, and the Belgian Gaston Barbanson.

== Creation ==
=== Organisation ===
The International Steel Agreement was created on 20 September 1926. Its foundational text used the term "european economic union", in the euphoria that accompanied Germany's accession to the League of Nations. It received abundant commentary in the French press. L'Humanité denounced the return of German imperialism on the international scene.

The cartel operated under the direction of a Council composed of industry representatives from Germany, France, Belgium and Luxembourg. Its members were joined a year later by Austria, Czechoslovakia, and Hungary, each with their own production quota. The European agreement took on a truly global dimension in 1929, through an agreement with American, British and Canadian companies, and later with the accession of Japanese and Swedish producers.

=== Operation ===
The cartel determined production quotas trimestrially via a rigorous measurement of national quotas, derived from the total quantity produced by cartel members. A Swiss trust company was responsible for monitoring the production statistics provided by the companies.

The system was supplemented with sanctions: each national group was declared accountable for its country's adherence to production quotas. They were obliged to pay to the cartel 4 dollars per ton exceeding its quota, even if was produced by a company that was not a member. It was soon agreed that this sum was too high, and it was reduced several times.

=== Iron ore and coke supplies ===
One of the first decisions of the cartel was in October 1926 the signature of an agreement on the supply of raw iron to Germany, covering 10,5% of German needs, and reserving 7,46% for the Lorraine and 3,09% for Luxembourg. According to the Financial Times, this cartel was a good means of absorbing the substantial surplus of Lorraine iron ore. This agreement was followed on 4 November 1926 with the signature of a similar agreement on imports of rolled steel products covering 6,5% of German needs (Lorraine, 3,75% and Luxembourg, 2,75%).

=== Economic choices ===
As a basis for its exports, the cartel used prices that were considerably higher than what would have been achievable in a free market. It aimed to provide medium-term visibility to a rapidly growing steel industry driven by domestic demands but marked by inequalities in the size of companies and access to resources and waterways, intending to make these differences complementary.

The German quota was set below the proportion of production figures, while the Belgian quota was set above this proportion, a solution adopted for political reasons. The quotas were intended to preserve all the production capacity, including marginal establishments, guaranteeing their existence and profitability.

== Challenges ==
=== Initial German misgivings ===
From late 1924, with the return of monetary stability, there was a significant upturn in investments in Germany, and economic growth returned. The country had become a major borrower on the international financial markets in the years 1925–1929, mostly with American, British and Dutch funds, to the tune of more than 25 billion francs. All companies had borrowed in Germany, where after 1927, only 1,3% of corporations owned 46% of total capital.

From September to December 1926, Germany was particularly productive after the restructuring of its steel industry, and systematically surpassed its quota by 9 to 25%. For this, it had to pay 2,7 million dollars in penalties. From early 1927, some industrialists criticised the quotas, and the fact that they had not been increased enough, given the period of economic upturn. German steel producers energetically demanded a revision of the quotas, and threatened to leave the Agreement.

=== New exporting countries after 1929 ===
The Cartel did not survive the upheaval caused by the Great Depression starting in 1929. Controlling only a third of the world production, it was able to regulate a growing market where domestic demands in each country created an export deficit. However, it could not contend with the overall trend towards decreasing prices, which intensified following the abrupt change in economic conditions in 1929. Some other major producers (United Kingdom, United States) shifted significantly towards foreign markets from that point onward. This trend was also evident in a crucial member of the cartel, Germany, which experienced an initial financial shock as early as 1927.

=== Nazi Germany's turn towards Sweden ===
Furthermore, starting from 1933, Nazi Germany increasingly turned to its steel industry for armament and chose to import more iron ore from Sweden to meet this new demand. Martin-Siemens steel, which was used to produce high-speed steels and special steels, among other things for arms production, tolerated only a very low phosphorus content. The Lorraine ore, known as minette, had a phosphorus content that, at that time, did not allow the production of Martin steel. Swedish iron ore, with low phosphorus content, gradually replaced French ore in large part. Moreover, this diversification also aligned with diplomatic interests.

As early as July 1930, the Cartel decided to suspend control over the production of crude steel and attempted to unify export prices and allocate export quantities through temporary counters, but failed to stem the crisis.

== New formula of 1933 ==
Its successor, established on 25 February 1933, was less ambitious but more stable, and was limited to regulating exports. The first version had disappeared due to a more pronounced export trend, as it seemed ill-suited to it. However, during the summer of 1931, the collapse of prices, dropping from 6 to 2 pounds sterling per ton, forced a return to negotiations at the end of 1931.

The cartel with the new formula disappeared with the onset of the Second World War, during which numerous studies conducted in the United States call for the prohibition of international cartels, presented as the basis for German expansion and a possible risk to the security of America.

== World War II and post-war period ==
During World War II, Alexis Aron, the former head of Forges et Aciéries du Nord et de l'Est, who had taken refuge in the Alps, drafted plans in 1943 for the future European steel industry: documents describing a peace based on reconciliation, drawing primarily from the experience of the International Steel Agreement. Alexis Aron proposed to rebuild this by modifying certain aspects. His plan closely resembled the one developed by Pierre Mendès France, but it faced opposition from several industry leaders who saw it as a first step towards nationalization, a solution adopted in England, a country where the steel industry did not, unlike France, have significant iron ore mines.

== See also ==
- Swedish iron-ore industry during World War II
- Minette (ore)
