= Marie Delcourt =

Belgian classical philologist (1891–1979)

Marie Delcourt (Ixelles, 18 November 1891 – Liège, 11 February 1979) was a Belgian classical philologist. She studied at the University of Liège (ULg), and obtained a PhD in classical philology in 1919. Under the German occupation of Belgium during World War I she was active in the Dame Blanche resistance network. She was the first female part-time lecturer at the ULg.

An expert in the history of the ancient Greek religion, Marie Delcourt was particularly interested in the psychological dimension of religious facts. She was also a newspaper columnist and editorialist. She was married to writer Alexis Curvers.

== Publications ==
Ancient history

- La vie d'Euripide, Éd. Gallimard, Paris, 1930. Rééd. Labor, Bruxelles, 2004, coll. Espace Nord
- Eschyle, Éd. Rieder, Paris, 1934 (Maîtres de Littérature, 18)
- Stérilités mystérieuses et naissances maléfiques dans l'antiquité classique, Éd. Droz, Paris, 1938 (FacPhLLg, 82)
- Périclès, Éd. Gallimard, Paris, 1939 (prix quinquennal de l'essai 1940)
- Légendes et cultes de héros en Grèce, P.U.F., Paris, 1942
- Images de Grèce, Éd. Libris, Brussel, 1943
- Œdipe ou la légende du conquérant, with Conrad Stein, Éd. Fac.Phil.Lett., Liège, 1944, (FacPhLg, 104)

- Translated by Malcolm B. DeBevoise as Oedipus; or, The Legend of a Conqueror (Michigan State University Press, 2020)

- Les grands sanctuaires de la Grèce, P.U.F. 1947 (Mythes et Religions, 21)
- L'oracle de Delphes, Éd. Payot, Paris, 1955
- Héphaistos ou la légende du magicien, Éd. Belles-Lettres, Paris, 1957 (FacPhLLg 146)
- Hermaphrodite, mythes et rites de la bisexualité dans l'antiquité classique, Éd. P.U.F., Paris, 1958 (Mythes et Religions, 36)

- Translated by Jennifer Nicolson as Hermaphrodite: Myths and Rites of the Bisexual Figure in Classical Antiquity (1961)

- Oreste et Alcméon. Étude sur la projection légendaire du matricide en Grèce, Éd. Belles-Lettres, Paris, 1959 (FacPhLLg 151)
- Pyrrhus et Pyrrha. Recherches sur les valeurs du feu dans les légendes helléniques, Éd. Belles-Lettres, Paris 1965, (FacPhLLg 174)

History of humanism

- Thomas More, œuvres choisies, Éd. La Renaissance du livre, Paris, 1936 (Les Cent Chefs-d'œuvre étrangers)
- Érasme, Éd. Libris, Brussels, 1944

Translations

- Tragiques Grecs. Euripide, Éd. Gallimard, Paris, 1962, (Bibliothèque de la Pléiade)
- Thomas More. L'Utopie, Éd. La Renaissance du Livre, Brussels, 1966
- La correspondance d'Érasme, Collectif, tomes 1, 10, 11, Éd. Presses Académiques Européennes, Bruxelles, 1967–1982

Varia

- Jean Schlumberger, essai critique, Éd. Gallimard, Paris, 1945
- Méthode de cuisine à l'usage des personnes intelligentes, Éd. Baude, Paris-Bruxelles, 1947
- L'autre regard, Ed. Le Cri/Académie royale de langue et de littérature françaises, Brussels, 2004. A collection of her columns from Le Soir.
