= Charles Simonis =

Luxembourgish politician and jurist

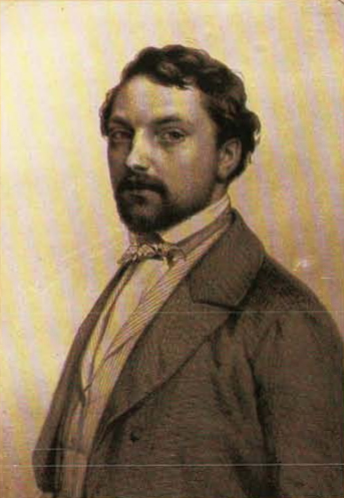
Undated portrait of Simonis

Charles Mathias Édouard Simonis (21 September 1818 – 1 November 1875) was a Luxembourgish politician and jurist. Simonis was Mayor of Luxembourg City from 1873 until his premature death, in 1875. He also sat in the Chamber of Deputies. In the Chamber, he was notable for his leadership of the campaign against the creation of a National Bank, which he maintained until his death. Simonis was one of 26 subscribers, along with various other notable liberal politicians, to the Companie des Hauts Fourneaux Luxembourgeois.

Simonis was a member of the communal council of Luxembourg City, before becoming an échevin on 22 December 1854.

== Footnotes ==
Political offices
| Preceded by Jean Mersch-Wittenauer | Mayor of Luxembourg City; 1873–1875 | Succeeded by Emmanuel Servais |
