= Alexis Curvers =

Belgian writer (1906–1992)

Alexis Curvers (24 February 1906, Liège – 7 February 1992) was a French-speaking Belgian writer. He was married to hellenist Marie Delcourt.

== Biography ==
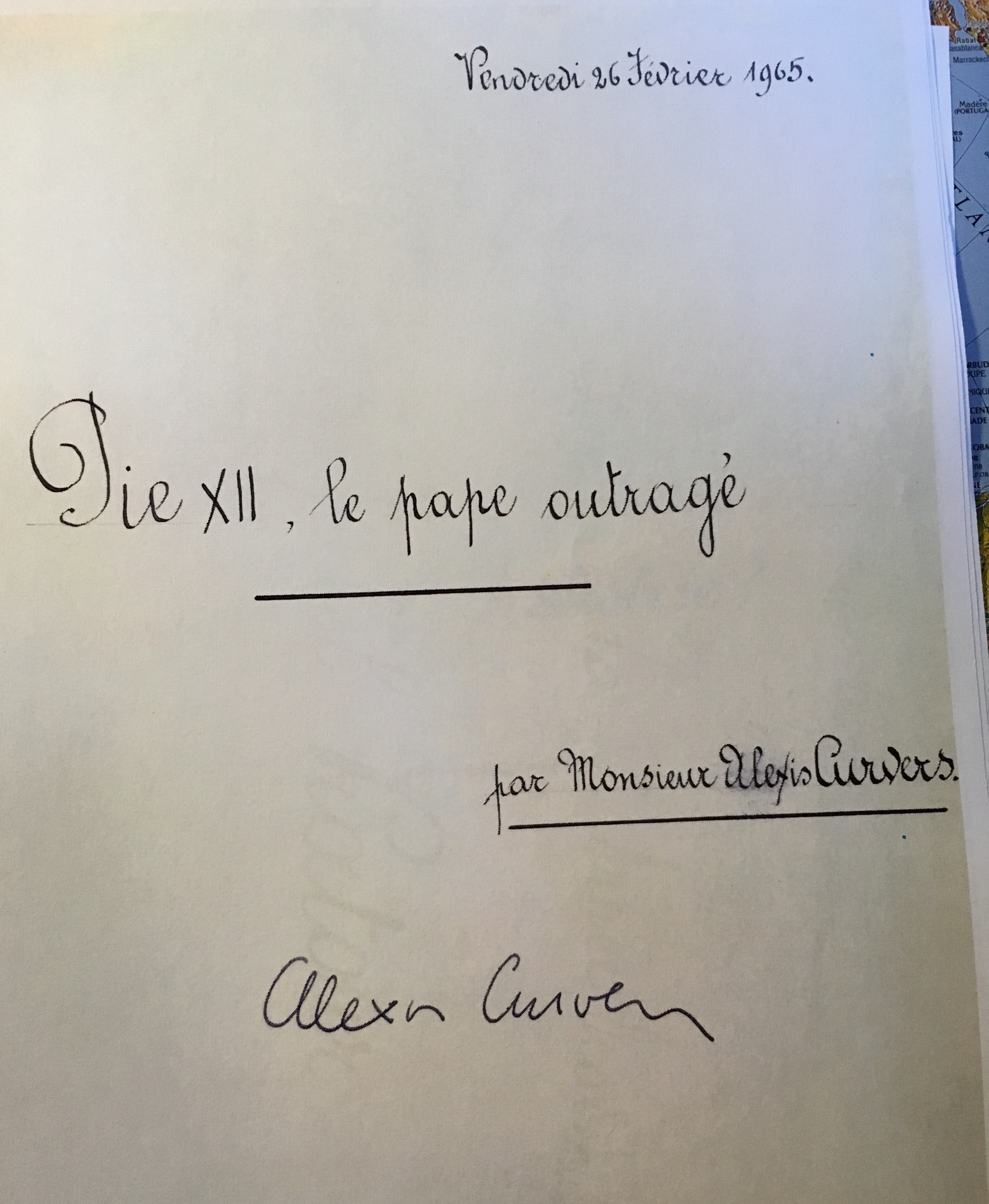
Meeting 26 February 1965 at chateau Dresse

Alexis Curvers' mother died when he was three years old and his father when he was nineteen. He followed the courses of Marie Delcourt at the University of Liège. Appointed a professor of rhetoric at Alexandria, he returned to Liege where he married Marie Delcourt. In 1933 he published an article entitled De l'objection de conscience which led him to be excluded from teaching. In 1940, he took refuge in the south of France, where he met other writers at Mme Mayrisch, before he returned to Liège. In 1957, his novel Tempo di Roma, rejected by Éditions Gallimard but published by Éditions Robert Laffont thanks to Marie de Vivier (pen name of Marie Jacquart, writer from Belgium) achieved great success.

Tempo di Roma obtained the Prix Sainte-Beuve in 1957 and was adapted to the cinema by Denys de La Patellière in 1963 under the same title: Tempo di Roma. In 1960, Alexis Curvers received the prix littéraire Prince-Pierre-de-Monaco for all his work.

== Works ==
=== Novels ===
- 1937: Bourg-le-Rond, Paris, Gallimard, (with Jean Sarrazin, Jean Hubaux's pen name)
- 1939: Printemps chez des ombres, Paris, Gallimard, (prix Auguste-Beernaert)
- 1957: Tempo di Roma, Paris, Robert Laffont

=== Short stories ===
- 1942: La Famille Passager, études et contes, Brussels, Libris, 1942. (Coll. Le balancier, 8).
- 1958: Mercredi des cendres, in Vingt nouvelles belges, Verviers, Marabout, 1958. (Coll. Melio) p. 66 sqq.
- 1955: Entre deux anges, chroniques et nouvelles, Brussels, Audace et le Rond-Point, 1955.
- 1967: Jean ou le monastère des deux saints Jean, in Prénoms (Paris, Plon, 1967)
- 1937: Le Ruban chinois in Reflets, Brussels, Noël
- 1954: Le Massacre des innocents et Le ruban chinois, Paris, Les belles lectures

=== Poetry ===
- Cahier de poésie (1922-1949), typography François Bernouard, Paris, 1949.
- La Flûte enchantée, Cahiers d'art poétique, published in Liège from 1953 to 1962.

=== Theatre ===
- Ce vieil Œdipe, four-act satirical drama, prose and verse, after Sophocles, Brussels, De Visscher, 1947. (Coll. du Rideau de Bruxelles).

=== Essais and critics ===
- De l'objection de conscience, état de la question, le Flambeau, June 1933 and Brussels, Finacom, 1933.
- Sur la réforme de l'orthographe et la pédagogie nouvelle, réflexions d'un observateur, in "Bulletin de l'Académie Royale de Langue et de Littérature Françaises de Belgique", 1954. Reproduit dans le Bulletin de l'Association des Classiques de l'Université de Liège, nE2, 1954, p. 8-22.
- Pie XII, le pape outragé, Paris, Laffont, 1964. (Second edition revised and expanded: Pie XII, le pape outragé; Bonne nuit très saint Père; petite histoire anecdotique de ce livre, s.l., Dominique Martin Morin, 1988.)
- La théologie secrète de la prétendue Adoration de l'Agneau, in "Approches de l'Art", mélanges d'esthétique et de sciences de l'Art presented to Arsène Soreil, Brussels, Renaissance du Livre, 1973.
- Une clef architecturale de l'Agneau mystique des frères Van Eyck, in "Il était douze fois Liège", Liège, Mardaga, 1980.
- Edgar Scauflaire, by Alexis Curvers and Marie Curvers-Delcourt, Antwerp, De Sikkel, s.d. (monographs on Belgian art, 5th série, nE7).
- Entretien Georges Moucheron - Alexis Curvers, Mons, R.T.B.F., centre de production du Hainaut, s.d.

=== Collaborations ===
- Alexis Curvers collabiorated with the magazines Les cahiers mosans, Le courrier des poètes, La gaillarde, Revue Générale Belge, Marginales, Raf, Savoir et beauté, Le flambeau, Synthèses, Empreintes, Cahiers du Nord, Itinéraires, Lecture et tradition...
- Participation to the anthology Il était douze fois Liège, Liège, 1980 considered as a response to La Belgique malgré tout by Jacques Sojcher published the same year prior to the Manifeste pour la culture wallonne (1983) which Curvers didn't sign.

== Bibliography ==
- Véronique Jago-Antoine (1991). "Éléments biographiques". Tempo di Roma. Actes Sud. ISBN 2-86869-660-0.
- Alexis Curvers, l'homme et l'œuvre, n° spécial de la revue Ouvertures, 1981
- S. et N. De Winter, "Alexis Curvers", in André Malraux, Alexis Curvers, Francis Ponge, Brussels, Hatier, Auteurs contemporains, 1986, p. 45-67.
- "Alexis Curvers, pour son 80ème anniversaire", Itinéraires, n° 306, sept.-oct. 1986.
- Marie de Vivier, "Alexis Curvers", Le Thyrse, n°59, 1957.
