= Maria Van Rysselberghe =

Belgian writer

Maria Van Rysselberghe (née Monnom; 1866–1959) was a Belgian writer, best remembered for her collection titled Cahiers de la petite dame which was published posthumously in four volumes in the Cahiers André Gide. She was the wife of Théo van Rysselberghe, and a muse and confidante of André Gide.
