= Netty Probst =

Luxembourgish lawyer (1903–1990)

Netty Probst (1903–1990) was a Luxembourgish lawyer. She was the first female lawyer in Luxembourg.

She was the daughter of the lawyer and social democrat Jean-Pierre Probst, and graduated in law at the university. When she was to pass the qualifications as a lawyer in 1927, she was initially refused because of her gender. After protests from her male colleagues, however, she was allowed to pass, which is regarded as a great victory in the history of gender equality in Luxembourg. As a lawyer, she often defended females and handled divorce cases. In 1939, she proved that the common practice to fire a female teacher after marriage was illegal.
