= Louise Welter =

Louise Welter (1897–1999) was a Luxembourgish physician.

She became the first female physician in Luxembourg in 1923.
