= Robert Brasseur =

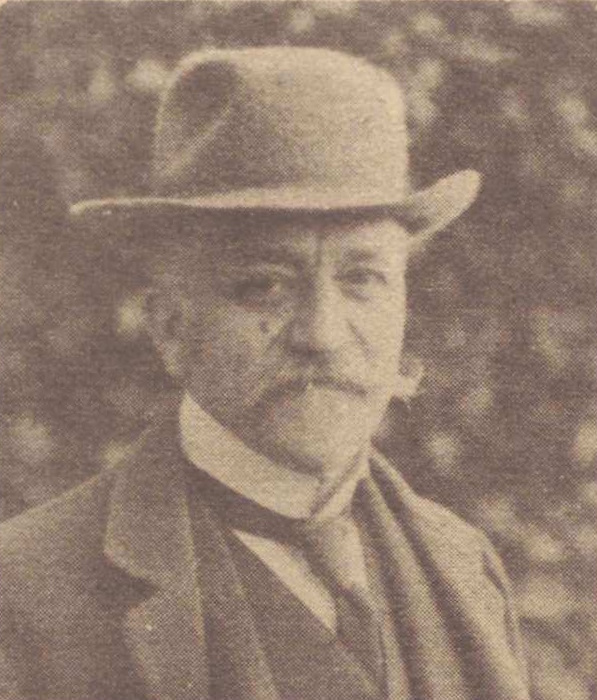
Brasseur c. 1925

Robert Brasseur (19 November 1870 – 15 February 1934) was a Luxembourgish politician, jurist, and journalist.

Born in Luxembourg, Brasseur was educated at the Athénée de Luxembourg, before studying law at University of Strasbourg and in Paris (at the École de Droit, the Sorbonne and the Collège de France). While in Paris, he became a bibliophile, starting a library to which he would continue to contribute over the rest of his life. He began working in journalism, reporting on the Dreyfus affair. Brasseur qualified on 16 December 1895, and was called to the bar on 3 January 1896.

He followed his father into politics, and was first elected to the Chamber of Deputies in 1899, representing Luxembourg City. In 1904, he was a founding member of the Liberal League. In the same year, he was elected to the communal council of Luxembourg City. He would sit in both the Chamber of Deputies and the Luxembourg City council until 1925. He would afterwards sit as a member of the Council of State.

Brasseur was the first President of the Luxembourgian Olympic and Sporting Committee (COSL), from 1912 until 1922.

Brasseur was a member of the prominent Brasseur family. His father, Dominique, was a deputy (1866 – 99) and mayor of Luxembourg City (1891 – 94). His uncle, Pierre, was a mining industrialist. Pierre's son, and Robert's cousin, Xavier, was a Socialist deputy and member of Luxembourg City's council at the same time as Robert (until his death in 1912). In 1914, Robert married Jeanne de Saint-Hubert (sister of Aline Mayrisch de Saint-Hubert), who had previously divorced Xavier.

== Footnotes ==
Sporting positions
New title Foundation of COSL	President of the COSL; 1912 – 1922	Succeeded by Maurice Pescatore
