= Luc Housse =

Luxembourgish politician (1871–1930)

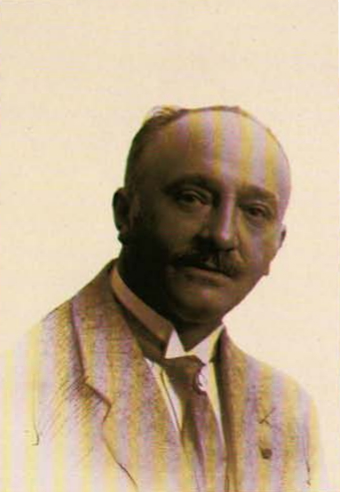
Undated portrait of Housse

Jean-Pierre Lucas "Luc" Housse (24 February 1871 – 18 May 1930) was a Luxembourgish politician who served as Mayor of Luxembourg City between 1918 and 1921. During his stint as mayor, the commune of Luxembourg was massively expanded, as it absorbed the surrounding communes of Eich, Hamm, Hollerich, and Rollingergrund.

There is a street in Cessange, Luxembourg City named after Housse (Rue Luc Housse).

Political offices
Preceded by Léandre Lacroix	Mayor of Luxembourg City; 1918–1921	Succeeded by Gaston Diderich
