= Marguerite Thomas-Clement =

Luxembourgish politician

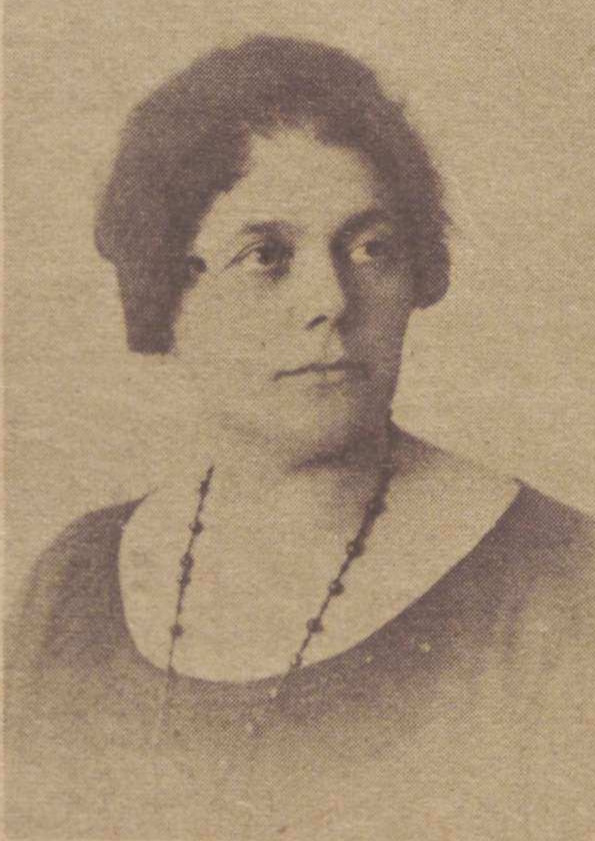
Thomas-Clement c. 1925

Marguerite Thomas-Clement (1886–1979) was a Luxembourgish women's rights activist and politician. She was the first woman to serve in Luxembourg's parliament.

She was married to the socialist Xavier Thomas, and was herself a member of the socialist party. There was never any organized women's suffrage movement in Luxembourg: women's suffrage was introduced in 1919 without any debate, as a part of the project of the new democratic constitution, and women's rights organizations mainly focused on educational opportunities. However, in 1917-1919, Marguerite Thomas-Clement was one of the few who spoke in favor of women's suffrage in public debates through articles in the press.

In 1919, the first election after women's suffrage, she became the first woman elected to parliament, where she served until 1931. She remained the only woman parliamentarian until Astrid Lulling in 1965. During her tenure, she tried to defend the rights of female workers and prostitutes.
