= Aline Mayrisch de Saint-Hubert =

Luxembourgish women's rights campaigner (1874–1947)

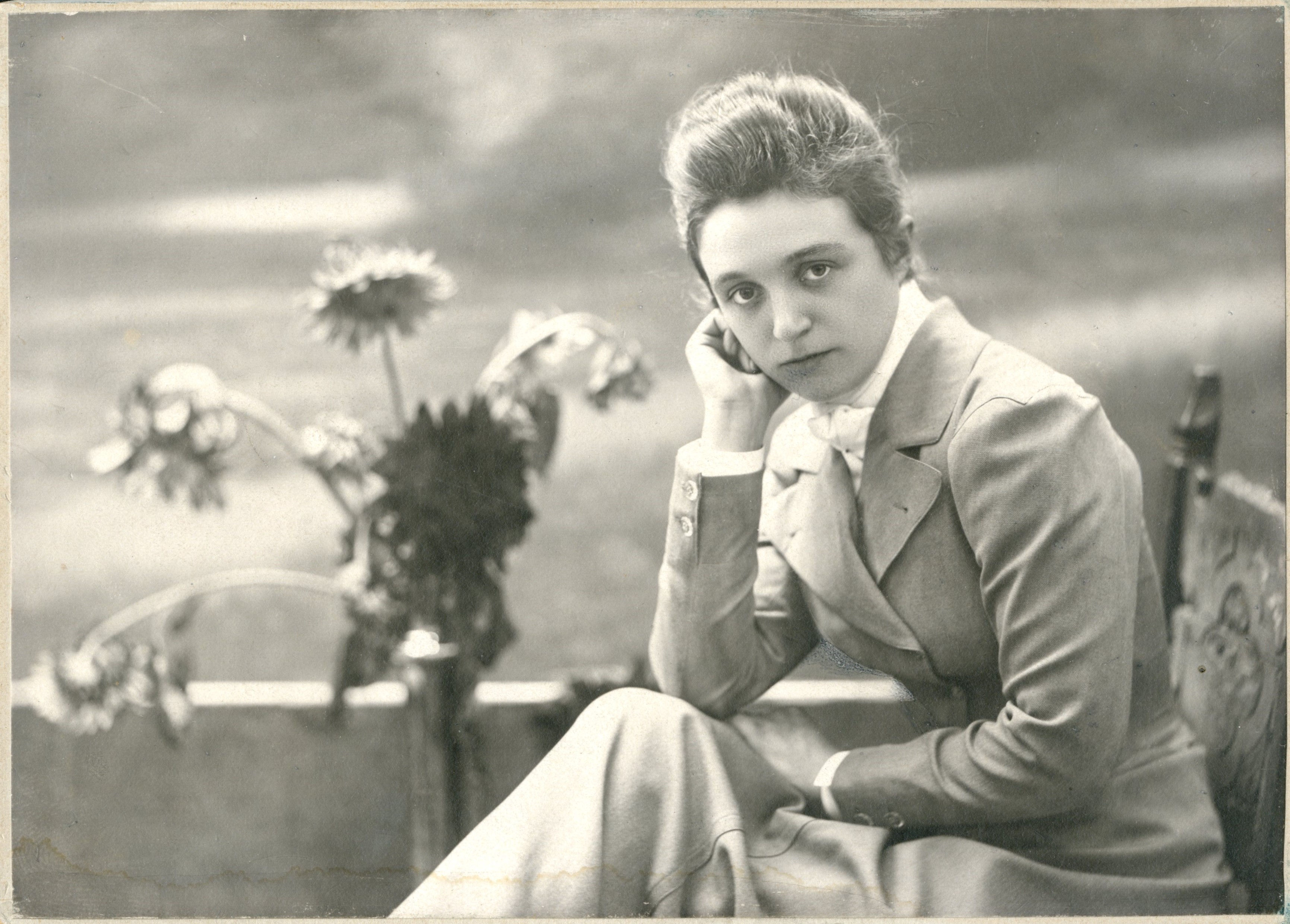
Photo of the young Aline de Saint-Hubert by Hofatelier Elvira

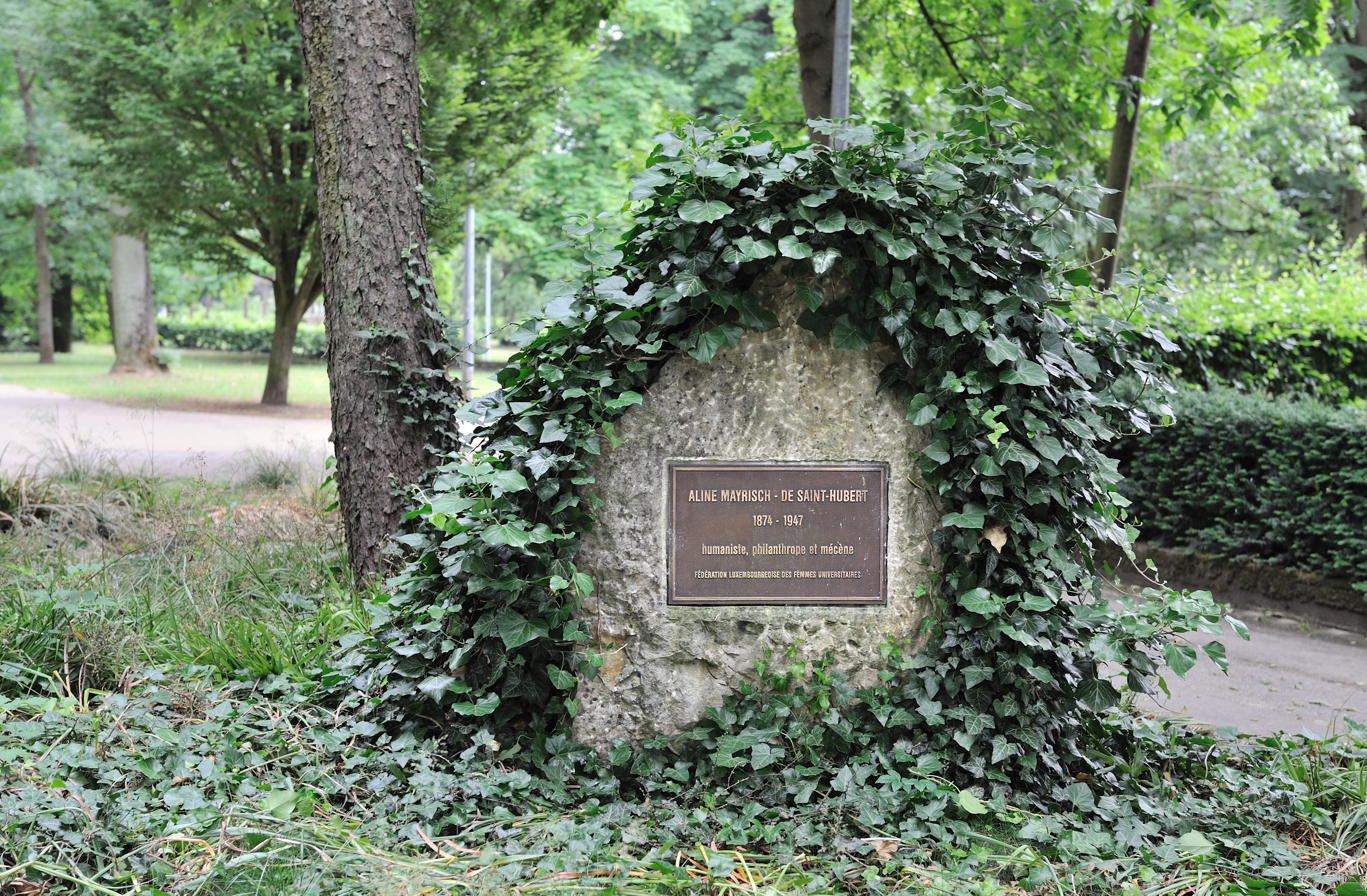
Monument commemorating Aline Mayrisch de Saint-Hubert

Aline Mayrisch de Saint-Hubert née de Saint-Hubert (22 August 1874 – 20 January 1947) was a Luxembourgish women's rights campaigner, socialite, philanthropist. Mayrisch established many non-governmental organisations and was President of the Luxembourg Red Cross. She married Émile Mayrisch.

== Life ==
Saint-Hubert was the daughter of Xavier de Saint-Hubert, and sister of Jeanne de Saint-Hubert, who had married Xavier Brasseur the previous year (and would marry Brasseur's cousin, Robert Brasseur, in 1914). She married the industrialist Émile Mayrisch, who would become President of the steel giant Arbed, on 15 September 1894. Together, they lived in Dudelange.

The first of many organisations that she set up was the 'League for the Defence of the Women's Interests' (French: l'Association pour la Défense des Intérêts de la Femme) in 1905. Saint-Hubert offered the patronage to Hereditary Grand Duchess Marie-Adelaide, but she declined, as a Roman Catholic feminist organisation was due to be set up.

The league's main purposes was to seek the establishment of public girls' schools, which gained momentum with the League's creation of the associated Association for the Creation of a School for Young Girls. This campaign achieved success in 1911 when the Chamber of Deputies unanimously voted to establish publicly funded girls' schools in Luxembourg City and Esch-sur-Alzette. At the same time, Mayrisch persuaded a group of other prominent Luxembourgish ladies to establish the Association of Girl Guides.

She was active in work for charitable organisations such as the Luxembourgish League against Tuberculosis, and the Luxembourgish Red Cross, as well as advocating for the professionalisation of social work.

On the outbreak of the First World War, Saint-Hubert set up a hospital near Dudelange, for the aid of servicemen of either side. After the war, she played a key role in setting up the Luxembourgish League Against Tuberculosis, of which she was Vice-President. She and her husband Émile were the main donors to the League and her other endeavours over the years. She soon became involved in the Luxembourg Red Cross, being appointed a member of its administrative council in 1926, Vice-President after the death of Émile in 1928, and President in 1933.

She and her husband moved to Colpach in 1920, and after the war they received many German and French intellectuals here under the name of Cercle de Colpach, such as Paul Claudel, Jean Guéhenno, Jacques Rivière, Karl Jaspers, Bernard Groethuysen, André Gide, Jean Schlumberger, Ernst Robert Curtius, Annette Kolb and Richard von Coudenhove-Kalergi. They turned their old house in Dudelange into a home for children, the Fondation Kreuzberg.

During World War II, she lived in Cabris in the south of France.

== Art and literature ==
Aline Mayrisch had a great interest in arts and literature and saw herself as a mediator between the German and French cultural worlds. From 1898, she published articles on German painters and literary criticisms, amongst others on L'Immoraliste by André Gide, in the Belgian avant-gardist review L'Art moderne. She maintained friendships and correspondences with numerous writers and intellectuals, such as André Gide, Jean Schlumberger, Jacques Rivière, Henri Michaux, Marie and Théo van Rysselberghe, Marie Delcourt, Alexis Curvers, Annette Kolb, Gertrude Eysoldt, Ernst Robert Curtius and Bernhard Groethuysen.

In 1914, she accompanied André Gide and Henri Ghéon to Turkey and in 1927, she travelled to the Gironde and the Limousin with Ernst Robert Curtius. In Colpach Castle, she arranged Franco-German encounters at which André Gide could meet Walther Rathenau and Ernst Robert Curtius. Aline Mayrisch also introduced André Gide to the texts of Rainer Maria Rilke, and in publishing an article on Rilke in the Nouvelle Revue Française, she helped find a French public for the German writer. It was in this same review that she published articles on the intellectual situation in Germany after the First World War, as well as her autobiographical travel account Paysages de la trentième année, which, starting in the island sceneries of Corsica and Iceland, evoked the confrontation with emptiness, absurdity and nothingness.

Her unfinished novel Andrée Reimenkampf has not been preserved for posterity. In collaboration with Marie Delcourt and Bernhard Groethuysen, Aline Mayrisch also translated the sermons of the medieval mystic Meister Eckhart, L'enfant qui s'accuse by Jean Schlumberger and Le mythe de Sisyphe. Essai sur l'absurde by Albert Camus. In the 1930s, Aline Mayrisch financially supported the exile publication Maß und Wert, edited by Thomas Mann. The following works were dedicated to Aline Mayrisch: Das literarische Frankreich von Heute by Frantz Clément, Les Cahiers de la Petite Dame by Marie van Rysselberghe and La vie d'Euripide by Marie Delcourt.

== Legacy ==
The Lycée Aline Mayrisch, open in 2001 in Luxembourg City, the city in which she was born, is named after her.
