= Athénée de Luxembourg =

- Athenaeum
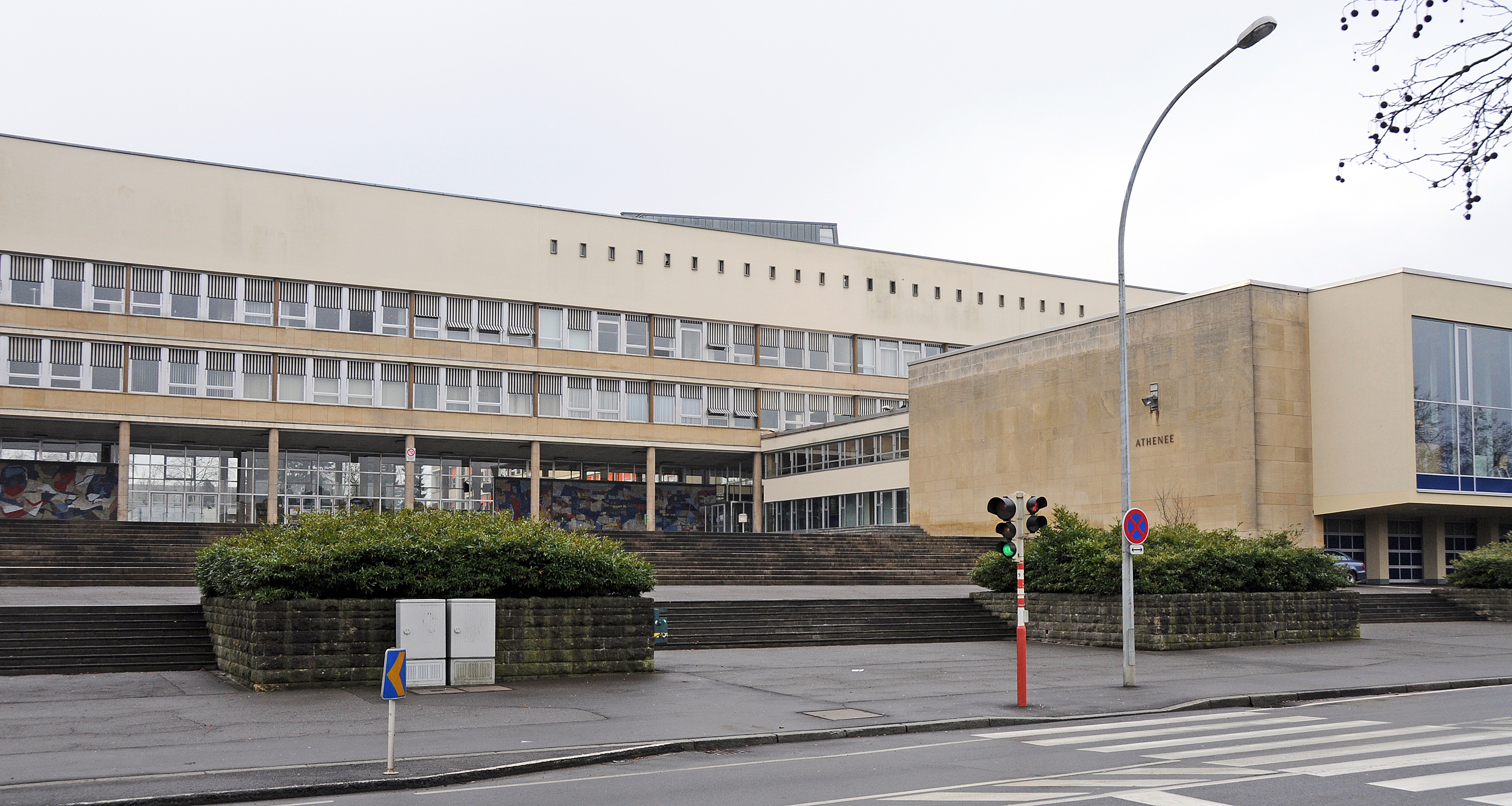

Location
- 24, Boulevard Pierre Dupong; Luxembourg City; Luxembourg; 49°36′15″N 06°06′39″E

Information
- Type: State school
- Motto: "Innovation comme tradition" "Vivat, crescat, floreat" ("Innovation is our Tradition" "Vivat, crescat, floreat")
- Established: 1603; 423 years ago
- Founder: Jesuit Order
- Principal: Claude Heiser
- Staff: 173
- Enrollment: 1513+ students
- Campus size: 0.2 square kilometres (0.077 mi^{2})
- Campus type: Campus Geesseknäppchen
- Yearbook: D'Buch
- Website: www.al.lu

The Athénée de Luxembourg (French pronunciation: [atene də lyksɑ̃buʁ], "Luxembourg Atheneum"), is a high school situated in Luxembourg City, in southern Luxembourg. Throughout the school's history of more than 400 years, its name was changed repeatedly. It is popularly known in Luxembourgish as the Stater Kolléisch or (De) Kolléisch, and is the nation's oldest school still in existence.

== History ==
=== Jesuit origins ===
On 15 May 1585, Pope Sixtus V signed a Papal bull granting the Jesuit Order the right to establish a school in Luxembourg. The school was eventually founded in 1603 by the Jesuit Order, and was located next to the Notre Dame Cathedral, in the Ville Haute district. It was modelled on the Jesuit school in Trier. The school flourished and in 1684 it was expanded. After the Suppression of the Society of Jesus by Pope Clement XIV in 1773, the school was renamed the Collège royal, and was put under auspices of the clergy. Furthermore, the school's curriculum was reformed and expanded.

=== Secularization ===
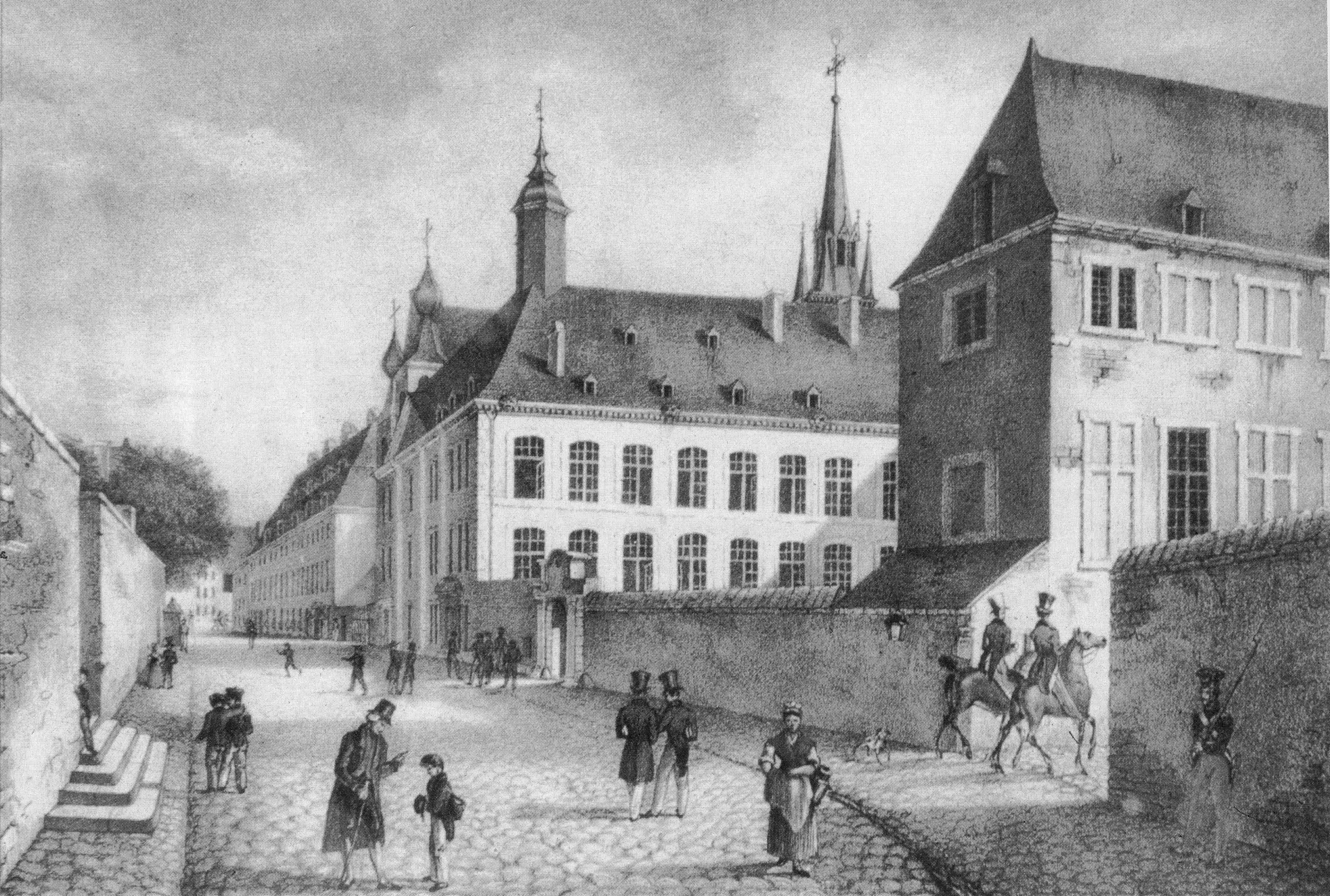
The Athénée de Luxembourg in 1828

In the course of the French Revolution and the political changes that followed (notably the Napoleonic regime), the school was reorganized along French educational lines and renamed several times: École centrale (1795-1802), École Secondaire (1802-1808), and Collège municipal (1808-1817). In 1817, the school was renamed "Athénée royal grand-ducal". To commemorate this event, a chronogram ATHENAEVM SIT LVCELBVRGI DECOR (=1817) was placed on the backside of a portal at the school's old premises.

Over the course of the 19th century, the curriculum was expanded and modernized.

=== Second World War ===
When Luxembourg was occupied by Nazi forces from 1940 to 1944, the school was forcibly Germanized, renamed the Gymnasium mit Oberschule für Jungen, and the French language was forbidden. These policies were met with considerable resistance. Infamously, when the Germans dismantled the Gëlle Fra memorial, several hundred of the school's students protested. Two professors and 76 students of the Athénée lost their lives during the war.

=== Post-World War II: a new building ===
After the Second World War, the school's premises became too small, and the school was relocated in 1964 to the Hollerich district, in the south-west of the city. Since the Athénée moved to this location, other schools have moved to the site as well, creating the school’s Campus Geesseknäppchen, just north of the terminus of the A4 motorway. The old site of the city Athenaeum was host to the National Library until October 2019, when the library moved to Kirchberg.

=== 21st century ===
In 2003, the school celebrated its 400th anniversary with a series of events and the publication of a four-volume study of the school's rich history. The school's official motto is 'Tradition & Innovation', a phrase that the reflects the institution's continuous emphasis on scholarly excellence, the respect of humanist traditions and the desire to stay innovative.

From 2007 to 2018, Joseph Salentiny served as the Athénée’s principal until he retired and was replaced by Claude Heiser who is the principal of the school. In 2012, temporary buildings were built in the school's courtyard to accommodate the students while the existing premises underwent renovation. The renovations cost 89 million euros, and were completed in late 2016.

== Academic aspects ==
The Athénée de Luxembourg is an academic institution that achieves highly competitive public exam results. In 2015, the final exam results and the passing rate was higher than the national average. In 2015, 235 students presented themselves to the exams.

=== International Baccalaureate ===
In 2010, the Athénée de Luxembourg gained the status of an IB World School, and henceforth, offers the International Baccalaureate as one of its programmes. The school offers preparatory grades and the option to study in the IB Diploma Programme.

=== The school's charter ===
The school adopted a charter outlining its educational guidelines and principles. The charter is built on the principle of "a good possession for all time", a quote borrowed from Thucydides. The charter consists of twelve principles:

- Humanism and world openness
- A critical and scientific mind
- A taste for performance and joy of living
- Ambition to succeed and respect for others
- Competition and solidarity
- Personal engagement and tolerance
- Communal conscience and self-fulfillment
- Responsibility and friendliness
- Discipline and flexibility
- Physical balance and intellectual enthusiasm
- Creativity and endurance
- Know how and life skills

== Extracurricular ==
=== Kolléisch in Concert ===
Kolléisch in Concert is a series of concerts that have been organised at the school since 1981 and normally take place at the Conservatoire of Luxembourg. Each year, the concerts take place before the Easter holidays. The music is primarily performed by the students of the musical section. There is normally a musical, an orchestra and a dance.

=== annALes de l'Athénée de Luxembourg ===
annALes de l'Athénée de Luxembourg is an annual publication chronicling that year's events at the school as well as containing essays relating to the schools or its alumni. The series has been published since 2008 and contains articles written in French, German, English and Luxembourgish.

=== Éischt Hëllef Team Kolléisch (EHTK) ===
Éischt Hëllef Team Kolléisch (EHTK) (First Aid Team of the Athénée) is a first aid group run by students of the school. The EHTK was founded in 1998, and in collaboration with the Luxembourgish Red Cross, first aid courses are offered to students. The EHTK works on health and safety aspects within the school community. In 2015, Grand Duke Guillaume handed the Luxembourgish Youth Award (Prix du Mérite Jeunesse) to the EHTK. Other schools in Luxembourg have emulated the EHTK project. The EHTK keeps an infirmary at the Athénée where if students have a minor sickness or injury, they may visit.

=== Latein auf Stein ===
The "Latein auf Stein" (lit: Latin on Stone) is a project that aims to register and interpret all Latin inscriptions and chronograms in Luxembourg. Several schools in Germany have similar projects.

== Notable alumni ==
The Athénée has a long list of distinguished alumni, including eight Prime Ministers of Luxembourg, one Prime Minister of Belgium and one Prime Minister of France and many famous industrialists and politicians from Luxembourg. Former pupils include:

- Jean Asselborn, Deputy Prime Minister and Minister for Foreign Affairs and Immigration.
- Josy Barthel, chemist, Minister for Transport, and Olympic gold medalist.
- Baron Félix de Blochausen, Prime Minister of Luxembourg.
- Victor Bodson, European Commissioner and Righteous Among the Nations.
- Robert Brasseur, founding member of the Liberal League.
- Xavier Brasseur, founding member of the Socialist Party.
- Heinrich Johann Nepomuk von Crantz, physician and botanist.
- Pierre Dupong, Prime Minister of Luxembourg.
- Paul Eyschen, Prime Minister of Luxembourg.
- Gaspard-Théodore-Ignace de la Fontaine, Prime Minister of Luxembourg.
- Jean-Bapiste Fallize, first Vicar Apostolic of Norway.
- Luc Frieden, Prime Minister of Luxembourg
- Pierre Frieden, Prime Minister of Luxembourg.
- Michel Goedert FRS FMedSci, neuroscientist.
- Anne Kremer, tennis player.
- William Justin Kroll, metallurgist and inventor of the Kroll process.
- Joseph Kutter, Expressionist painter.
- Eugène Jungers, Governor-General of the Belgian Congo.
- Hana Sofia Lopes, actress.
- Émile Mayrisch, industrialist.
- Nicholas Muller, United States Representative from New York.
- Joseph Jean Baptiste Neuberg, mathematician who discovered the Neuberg cubic.
- Baron Jean-Baptiste Nothomb, Prime Minister of Belgium.
- Émile Reuter, Prime Minister of Luxembourg.
- Jacques Santer, Prime Minister of Luxembourg.
- Gaston Thorn, Prime Minister of Luxembourg.
- Robert Schuman, Prime Minister of France and founding father of the European Union.
- Emmanuel Servais, Prime Minister of Luxembourg.
- Félicien M. Steichen, American Professor of Surgery and pioneer in the development of surgical staples.
- Batty Weber, journalist.
- Antoine Wehenkel, President of the Chamber.
- Sosthène Weis, painter and architect.
- Nik Welter, writer and minister of education.

=== Notable staff members ===
- Léon Bollendorff, philologist and President of Chamber of Deputies.
- Michel Engels, painter.
- François-Xavier de Feller, Jesuit, author & newspaper editor.
- Jean-Baptiste Fresez, painter.
- Joseph Kohnen, writer.
- Laurent Menager, composer and conductor.
- Alain Meyer, French teacher and President of Luxembourg's Council of State.

== School principals ==
- 1603 - 1608 : Théodore Othon Becanus
- 1608 - 1609 : Zachéé Ribecius
- 1609 - 1621 : François Aldernardus
- 1621 - 1624 : Jean Spies
- 1624 - 1629 : Antoine de Torres
- 1620 - 1634 : Hubert Wiltheim
- 1634 - 1636 : Jean Petri
- 1636 - 1636 : Jean Henri de Nefve
- 1636 - 1643 : Jean Rutius
- 1643 - 1646 : Jean de Viron I
- 1646 - 1650 : François de Steel
- 1650 - 1653 : Jean-Michel Ludling
- 1653 - 1656 : Jean de Viron II
- 1656 - 1659 : Alexandre Wiltheim
- 1659 - 1662 : Jean-Baptiste de Florbecq
- 1662 - 1665 : André de Preumonteaux
- 1665 - 1668 : François Flamen
- 1668 - 1671 : Guillaume de Waha
- 1671 - 1675 : Jean Mascault
- 1675 - 1678 : François Bellegambe
- 1678 - 1681 : Arnould Cardon
- 1681 - 1685 : Jacques Pirenne I
- 1685 - 1688 : Robert d'Assignies
- 1688 - 1691 : Jacques Pirenne II
- 1691 - 1694 : Joseph de Hennin
- 1694 - 1697 : Lucas de Lattre
- 1697 - 1700 : Pierre Alhoy
- 1701 - 1704 : Ignace de la Porte
- 1704 - 1707 : Pierre Forceville
- 1707 - 1710 : Christophe Locart
- 1710 - 1714 : Jean Quarré
- 1714 - 1717 : François Weydert I
- 1717 - 1720 : Etienne Petit
- 1720 - 1723 : Pierre Fievet
- 1724 - 1728 : Ambroise Lefebvre
- 1728 - 1732 : Anselme Battelet
- 1732 - 1735 : François Weydert II
- 1735 - 1738 : Jean de Wallers
- 1738 - 1742 : Ernest Hubertin
- 1742 - 1746 : Marc Casteele
- 1746 - 1749 : Ghislain Barbier I
- 1749 - 1753 : Henri Colle
- 1753 - 1756 : Ghislain Barbier II
- 1756 - 1758 : Hubert Busin
- 1759 - 1764 : Théodore Helm
- 1764 - 1767 : Paul Lalieu
- 1767 - 1769 : Firmin Murat
- 1769 - 1770 : Nicolas Heinen
- 1770 - 1773 : Joseph Descornaix
- 1817 - 1818 : Antoine Hartmann
- 1818 - 1821 : Jean-Gérard Mazuir
- 1821 - 1866 : Michel Nicolas Muller
- 1866 - 1867 : Jean-Pierre Michaelis
- 1867 - 1869 : Nicolas Gredt
- 1869 - 1884 : Alexandre de Colnet d'Huart
- 1885 - 1906 : Nicolas Gredt
- 1906 - 1917 : Gustave Zahn
- 1917 - 1931 : François Manternach
- 1931 - 1947 : Joseph Wagener
- 1947 - 1957 : Jean-Pierre Stein
- 1957 - 1970 : Pierre Winter
- 1970 - 1978 : Joseph Heinen
- 1978 - 1981 : Joseph Poeker
- 1981 - 1993 : Henri Folmer
- 1993 - 2007 : Emile Haag
- 2007 - 2018 : Joseph Salentiny
- 2018 - present time : Claude Heiser

== Gallery ==
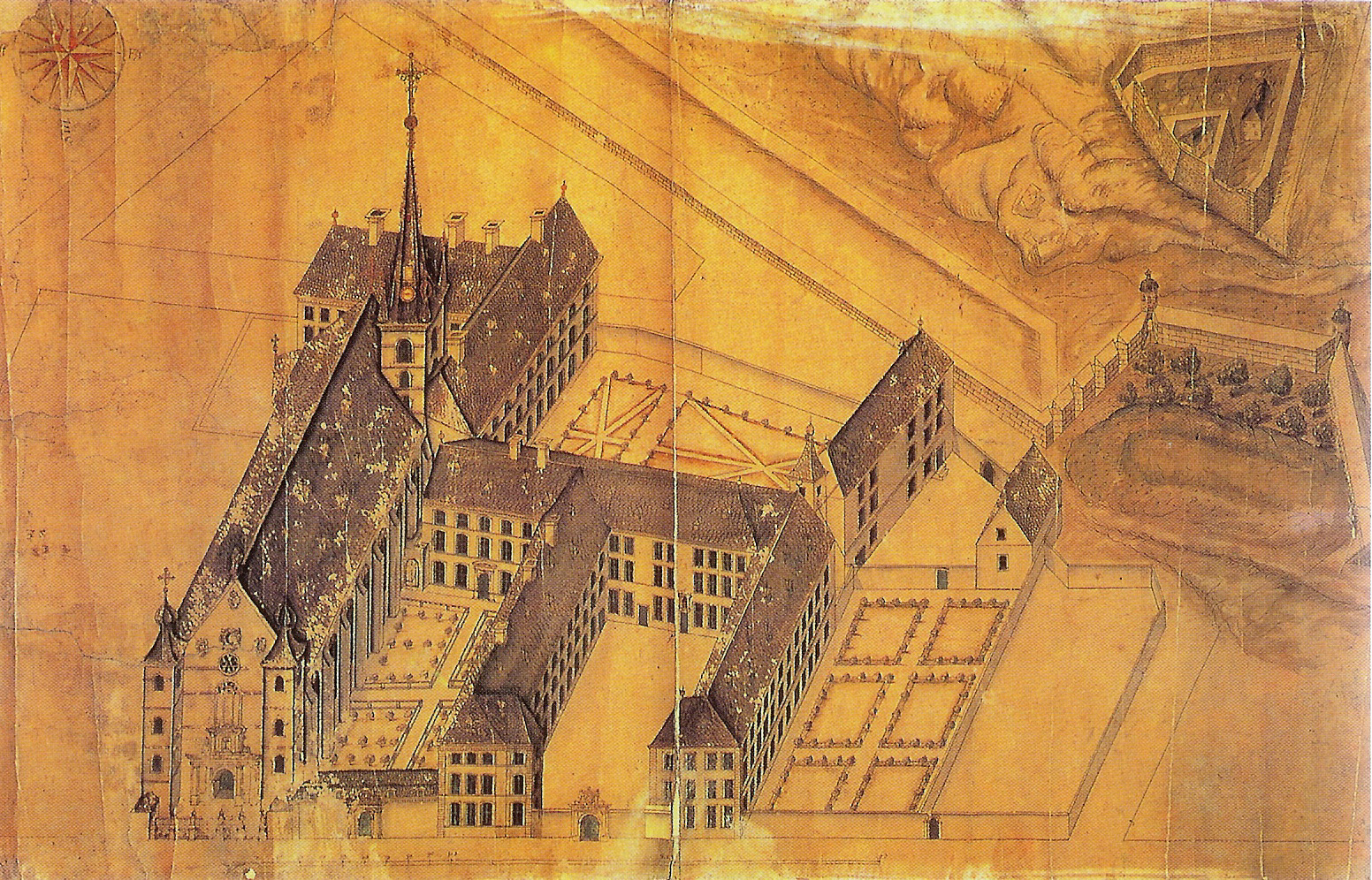
1686 Architectural plan of the Jesuit precursor of present-day Athénée de Luxembourg

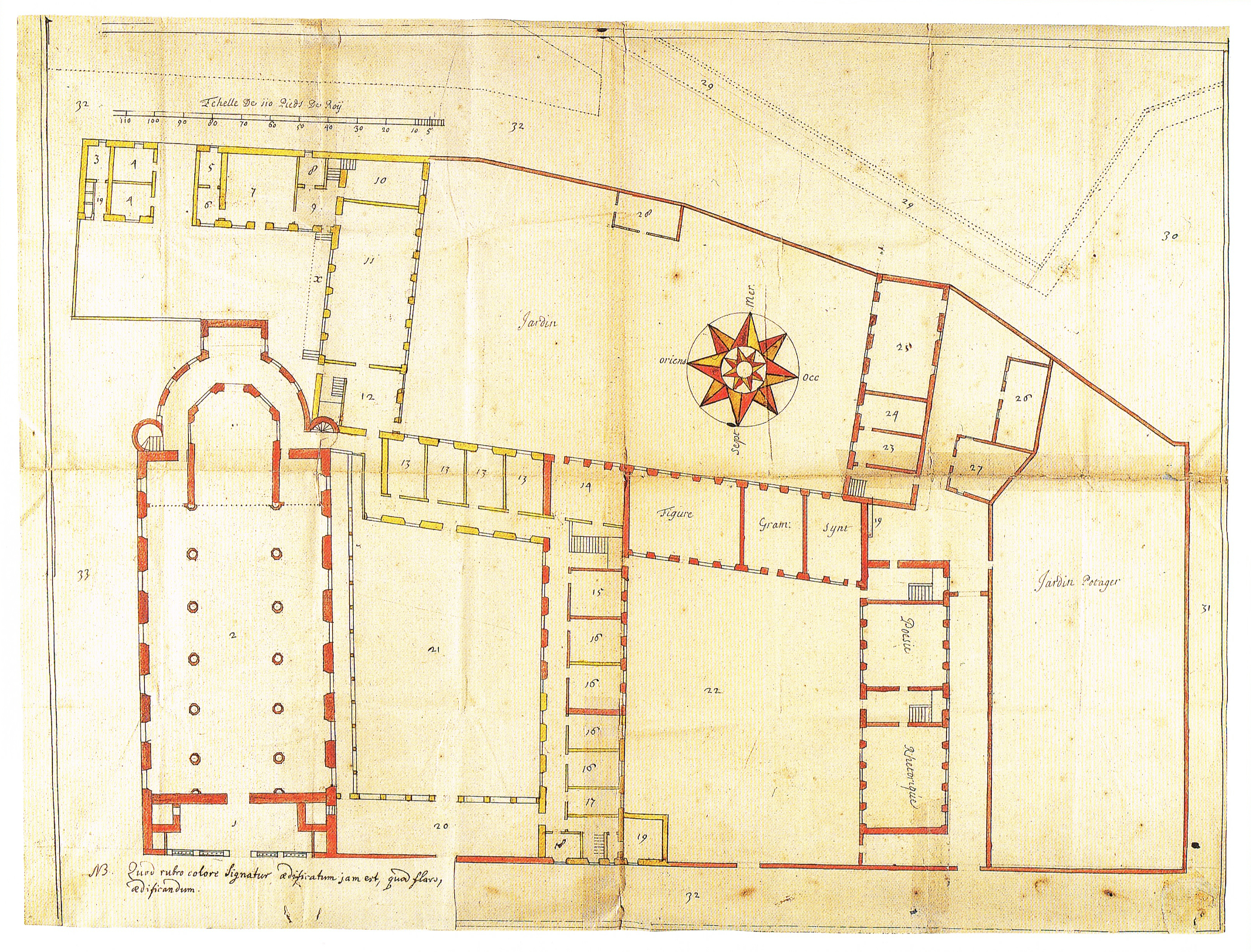
Architectural plan of the Jesuit college Athénée de Luxembourg and the Jesuit church in the Notre-Dame street.

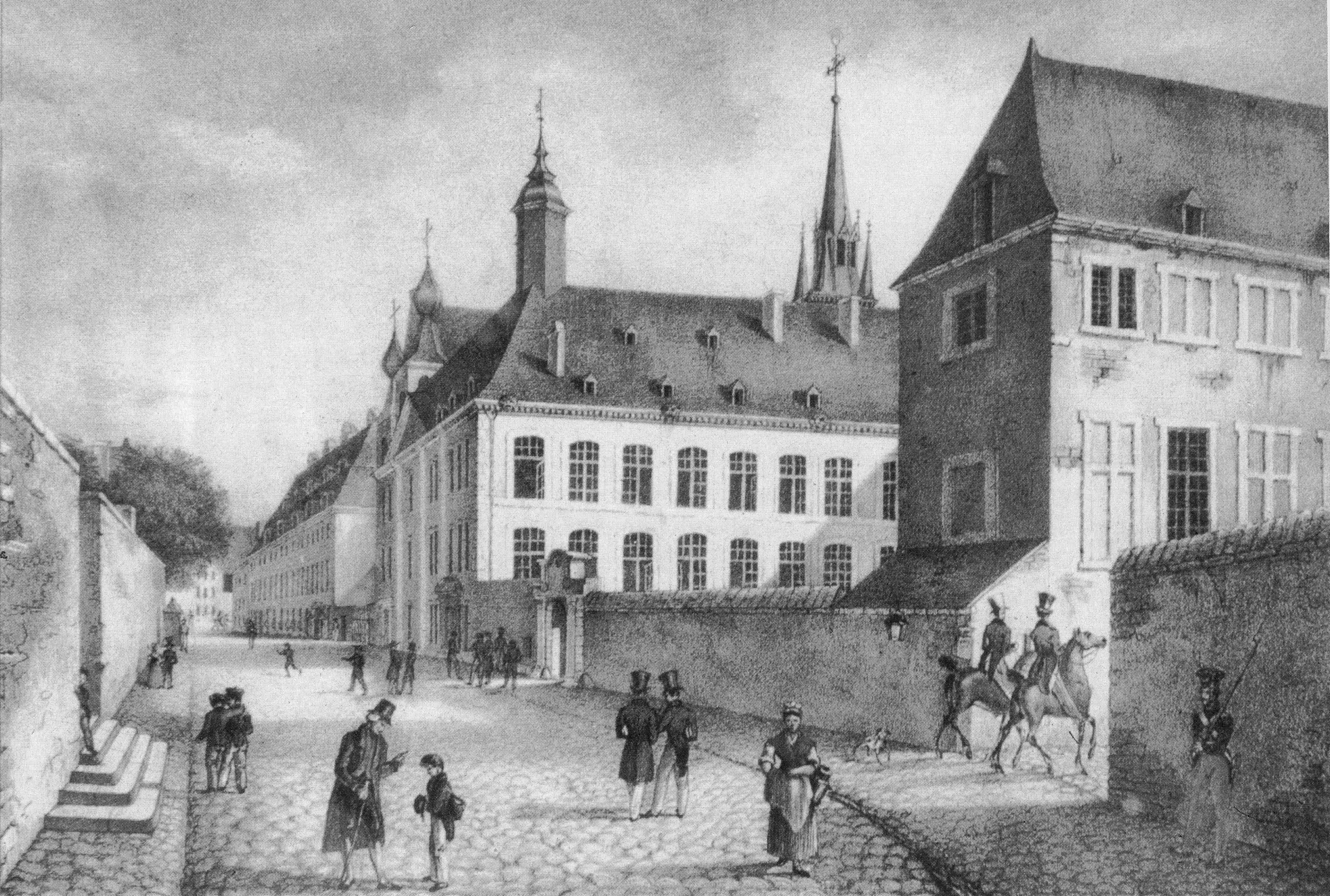
The Athénée de Luxembourg in 1828

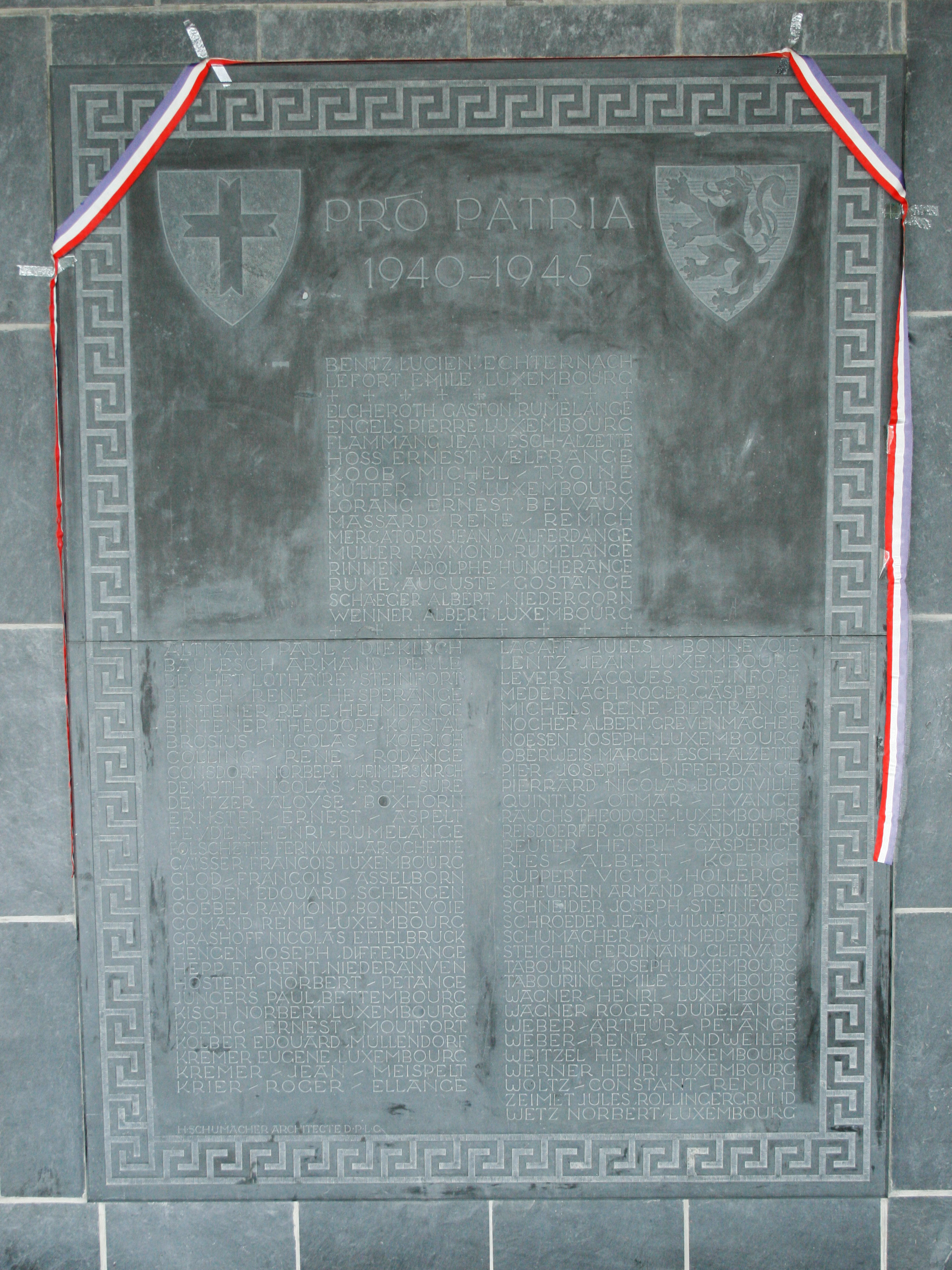
1940-1945 Pro Patria Memorial table is dedicated to alumni who lost their lives in World War II.

== Literature ==
- 400 Joer Kolléisch (Éditions Saint-Paul, 2003) (a comprehensive history in four volumes, written in French).
  - Vol. I : Du Collège des Jésuites au Collège Municipal 1603-1815 (287 pp.)
  - Vol. II: L'Athénée et ses grands Anciens 1815-1993. (477 pp.)
  - Vol. III: L'Athénée aujourd'hui et demain. (269 pp.)
  - Vol. IV: Hommage à l'Athénée. (314 pp.)
- Edouard Kayser: Les directeurs de l'Athénée depuis 1817 - Notices biographiques; in : De Kolléisch 2017; vol. I/II; Luxembourg (Publications de l'Athénée & Print Solutions, Luxembourg), 2018.
- Diederich, Paul: Athenäum 1932 - 1946, Wohnort und Schule (Association des Anciens de l'Athénée, 2001).
- Métamorphoses de l'Athénée, 1603 - 1989 (Luxembourg, 1989).
- Association des Anciens de l'Athénée: Kolléisch's Jongen am Krich, Luxembourg, November 2011, 570 p. ISBN 978-99959-729-0-5
- Haag, Emile: Les jésuites et leur collège: renforcement de l'identité catholique entre 1603 et 1773 (pp 180–193); Luxembourg (Éditions Guy Binsfeld), 2011; 576 pages (ill.); ISBN 978-2-87954-235-5
- Trausch, Gérard (1 April 2005), "L'Athénée de Luxembourg et le régime néerlandais 1815-1830/39", Hémecht (in French), vol. 57, no. 2
