= List of mayors of Luxembourg City =

Mayor of Luxembourg City
- Buergermeeschter vun der Stad Lëtzebuerg
- Coat of arms of Luxembourg City

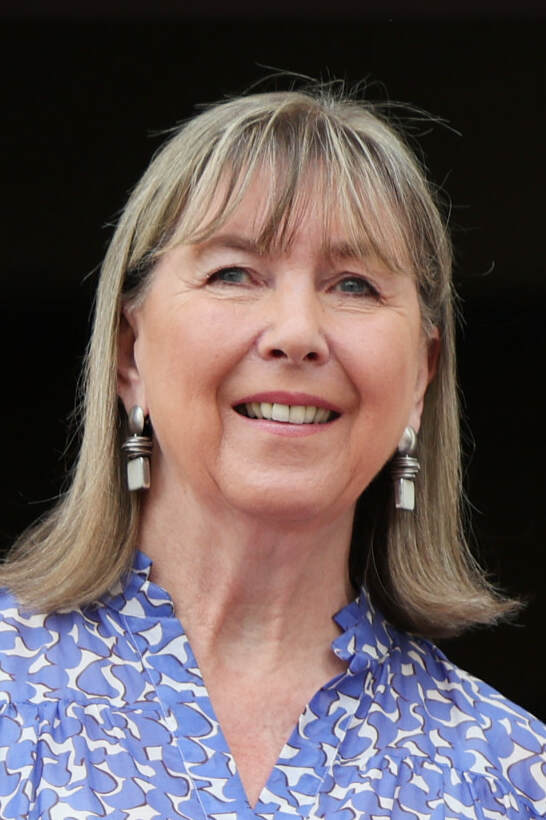
- Incumbent; Lydie Polfer since 4 December 2013
- Member of: Communal Council
- Seat: Luxembourg City Hall, Luxembourg City
- Nominator: Communal Council
- Appointer: Grand Duke
- Term length: 6 Years, No term limit
- Formation: 1693
- First holder: Jean-Bernard Knepper
- Deputy: College of Aldermen of Luxembourg City

The Mayor of Luxembourg City (Luxembourgish: Buergermeeschter vun der Stad Lëtzebuerg; French: Bourgmestre de la Ville de Luxembourg) is the mayor of Luxembourg's capital and largest city, Luxembourg City. The officeholder, like other mayors in Luxembourg, is appointed by the Grand Duke amongst council members. Due to the city's importance within the country (being home to a fifth of its population), the position as Mayor of Luxembourg City is one of the highest and most prestigious positions in Luxembourgish government and politics.

== List of mayors of Luxembourg City ==
Mayor	Term in office		Party
Jean-Bernard Knepper	1693	1698	
...	...	...	
Jean Jacques Faber	1795	1795	
Jean-Georges Pfortzheim	1795	1795	
François Hubert Abinet	1795	1797	
François Roeser	1797	1797	
François Hubert Abinet	1797	1797	
Hermann Urbain	1797	1800	
François Scheffer	1800	1802	
Jean-Baptiste Servais	1803	1811	
Charles Baron de Tornaco	1811	1814	
Bonaventure Dutreux-Boch	1814	1816	
François Scheffer	1816	1817	
Constantin Joseph Pescatore	1817	1820	
François Scheffer	1820	1822	
François Röser	1822	1827	
François Scheffer	1827	1843	
Fernand Pescatore	1844	1848	
Jean-Pierre David Heldenstein	1848	1850	
Gabriel de Marie	17 July 1850	1854	
Jean-Pierre David Heldenstein	1855	1865	
Théodore Eberhard	22 April 1865	30 December 1869	
Jean Mersch-Wittenauer	30 December 1869	30 January 1873	
Charles Simonis	30 January 1873	1 November 1875	
Emmanuel Servais	17 December 1875	17 June 1890	
Dominique Brasseur	27 January 1891	24 February 1894	
Émile Mousel	24 February 1894	24 July 1904	
Alphonse Munchen	24 July 1904	14 February 1915	Liberal League
Léandre Lacroix	1915	1918	Liberal League
Luc Housse	1918	1920	Social Democratic Party
Gaston Diderich	26 March 1921	29 April 1946	Liberal League (1921-1925); Radical Socialist Party (1925-1932); Radical Liberal Party (1932-1945); Patriotic and Democratic Group (1945-1946)
Émile Hamilius	22 June 1946	31 December 1963	Democratic Group (1946-1955); Democratic Party (1955-1963)
Paul Wilwertz	1 January 1964	23 December 1969	Luxembourg Socialist Workers' Party
Colette Flesch	23 December 1969	1 December 1980	Democratic Party
Camille Polfer	1 December 1980	31 December 1981	Democratic Party
Lydie Polfer	1 January 1982	18 August 1999	Democratic Party
Paul Helminger	18 August 1999	24 November 2011	Democratic Party
Xavier Bettel	24 November 2011	4 December 2013	Democratic Party
Lydie Polfer	4 December 2013	Incumbent	Democratic Party

== See also ==
- Luxembourg communal council
- Timeline of Luxembourg City
