= Der Hauptmann von Köpenick =

Der Hauptmann von Köpenick (The Captain of Köpenick) is the title of several films, plays, and television shows, all about the Hauptmann von Köpenick affair in 1906.

- The Captain of Köpenick (play) (1931), by Carl Zuckmayer
- The Captain from Köpenick (1926 film)
- The Captain from Köpenick (1931 film)
- The Captain from Köpenick (1945 film)
- The Captain from Köpenick (1956 film), starring Heinz Rühmann
- Der Hauptmann von Köpenick (1997 film), TV film starring Harald Juhnke

== See also ==
- The Captain from Köpenick (disambiguation)
