= The Captain from Köpenick =

The Captain from Köpenick may refer to:

- The Captain from Köpenick (1926 film), a German silent film
- The Captain from Köpenick (1931 film), a German film
- The Captain from Köpenick (1945 film), an American film completed in 1941 and released in 1945
- The Captain from Köpenick (1956 film), a West-German film

== See also ==
- Der Hauptmann von Köpenick (disambiguation)
