= Charles Bernhoeft =

Luxembourgish photographer

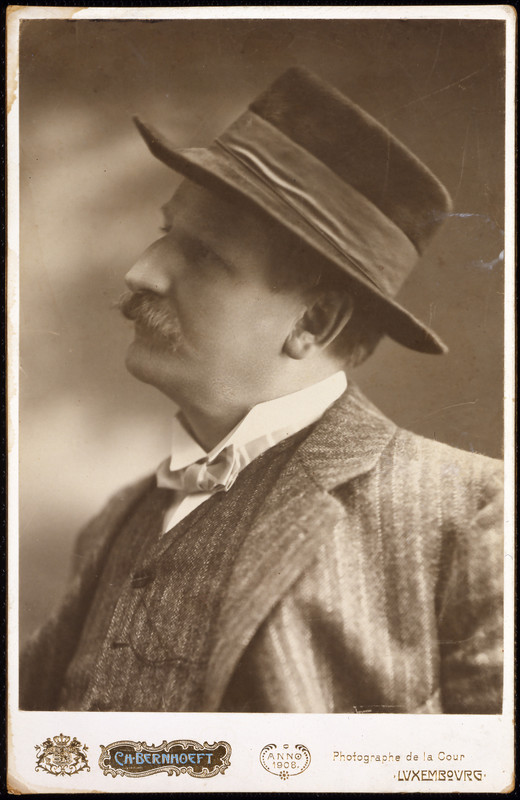
- Bernhoeft in 1908
- Born: Charles Michel Bernhoeft; 22 July 1859; Luxembourg City, Luxembourg
- Died: 7 February 1933 (aged 73); Beggen, Luxembourg
- Occupation: Photographer

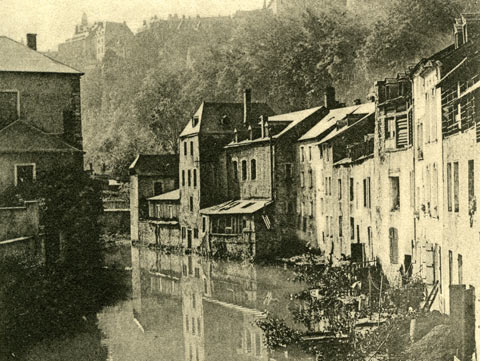
Bernhoeft: Pfaffenthal, Luxembourg (c. 1904)

Charles Michel Bernhoeft (22 July 1859 – 7 February 1933) was a Luxembourgish photographer known for his portraits of the Grand Ducal court, as well as numerous landscapes that he turned into postcards.

== Early life and family ==
Born in Luxembourg City on 22 July 1859, Bernhoeft was the son of army officer Carl Johann Adolph Bernhoeft and Marguerite Specht, the daughter of a merchant. He was the only son but had six sisters. In 1889, after studying photography and lithography, Bernhoeft married Marie-Louise Bernardy, a schoolteacher's daughter. They had two sons.

== Career ==
Bernhoeft created a number of photo albums, illustrated magazines and several series of postcards, one of which contains 1,600 different images. Some 20 people were employed by his firm, Editions photographiques Bernhoeft.

In 1895, together with the journalist Jean-Nicolas Moes, Bernhoeft launched Luxembourg's first illustrated weekly magazine, Das Luxemburger Land in Wort und Bild, which published nine issues.

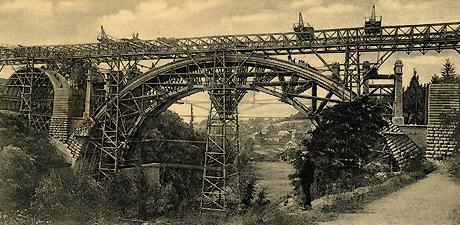
Bernhoeft: Construction of the Pont Adolphe, Luxembourg (1901)

He was appointed court photographer in 1891. His first studio in Luxembourg City was at 1, rue du Génie (now avenue Monterey), but by 1900 he constructed a three-storey building he called Atelier Bernhoeft at the corner of rue de l'Arsenal (Grand-Rue) and boulevard Royal. For his portraits, he used the widely available carte de visite and cabinet card formats.

Albums such as Cöln und der Rhein (1895–1896), Bilder aus der Pfalz (1895), Nederland in Beeld (1896) and Eifel-Album (1896) show that he did not travel far outside the borders of Luxembourg, although he did reproduce exotic pictures from exhibitions such as the Antwerp International Exposition in 1894.

Bernhoeft's work did much to encourage tourism, which was just beginning to develop at the time. He not only published photographic albums documenting Luxembourg and its surroundings, but also illustrated maps of the city and the Moselle Valley. His postcards were also popular with tourists.

He died in Beggen on 7 February 1933 and was buried at Notre-Dame Cemetery.

== Flash invention ==
Bernhoeft was also an inventor, developing systems providing indirect artificial lighting to facilitate portrait photography. He adapted the approach to magnesium flash photography, which proved successful for photographing children, unable to keep still for very long. He patented the device as Bernhoeft's Blitzlichtapparat Sanssouci and sold some 300 units.
