= The Captain from Köpenick (1956 film) =

1956 West German film directed by Helmut Käutner

The Captain from Köpenick Der Hauptmann von Köpenick
- Theatrical release poster by Tom Jung
- Directed by: Helmut Käutner
- Written by: Helmut Käutner; Carl Zuckmayer
- Based on: The Captain of Köpenick by Carl Zuckmayer
- Produced by: Gyula Trebitsch
- Starring: Heinz Rühmann; Hannelore Schroth; Martin Held; Erich Schellow
- Cinematography: Albert Benitz
- Edited by: Klaus Dudenhöfer
- Music by: Bernhard Eichhorn
- Production company: Real Film
- Distributed by: Real Film
- Release date: 16 August 1956; Ufa-Palast Cologne
- Running time: 93 minutes
- Country: West Germany
- Language: German
- Box office: 5.6 million DM

The Captain from Köpenick (German: Der Hauptmann von Köpenick) is a 1956 West German comedy film directed by Helmut Käutner and based upon the 1931 play The Captain of Köpenick by Carl Zuckmayer. The play was based on the true story of Wilhelm Voigt, a German impostor who masqueraded as a Prussian military officer in 1906 and became famous as the Captain from Köpenick. It was nominated for the 29th Academy Awards in the category Best Foreign Language Film.

It was shot by Real Film at the Wandsbek Studios in Hamburg. The film's sets were designed by the art director Albrecht Becker and Herbert Kirchhoff.

== Plot ==
A young mechanic is jailed for the forgery of low-value postal orders and is sentenced to 15 years. Upon release, after successfully working abroad, he returns to Germany due to homesickness. However, he receives a further sentence of 10 years for forging false identity documentation in an attempt to escape his past. Now, without a job, he cannot obtain a residence permit, and without a residence permit, he cannot secure a job. He tries to obtain a passport to go abroad again but is deemed too disreputable. Imprisoned for a third time, this time for 12 years, for breaking into a police station to forge a passport, he learns military drill. Eventually freed, he is issued with an expulsion order from the district.

By chance, he sees a Prussian Guards captain's uniform at a street stall and buys it. The film also covers the previous history of the uniform. He commandeers a handful of soldiers en route to their barracks and returns to his home district, arresting the mayor and demanding a passport. Learning that such documents are only issued by higher-level offices, he confiscates the town treasury and leaves.

He hands himself in to the police in exchange for a promised passport but becomes celebrated for his bravado, ultimately receiving both the passport and a pardon from Kaiser Wilhelm II.

== Cast ==
- Heinz Rühmann as Wilhelm Voigt
- Martin Held as Dr. Obermüller
- Hannelore Schroth as Mathilde Obermüller
- Willy A. Kleinau as Friedrich Hoprecht
- Leonard Steckel as Adolph Wormser
- Friedrich Domin as Jail Director
- Erich Schellow as Capt. von Schlettow
- Walter Giller as Willy Wormser
- Wolfgang Neuss as Kallenberg
- Bum Krüger as Schutzmann Kilian
- Joseph Offenbach as Wabschke
- Ilse Fürstenberg as Marie Hoprecht, Voigt's sister
- Maria Sebaldt as Auguste Viktoria Wormser, seine Tochter
- Edith Hancke as Sick girl
- Ethel Reschke as Pleureusenmieze
- Siegfried Lowitz as Stadtkämmerer Rosenkranz
- Willi Rose as Police sergeant
- Willy Maertens as Prokurist Knell
- Kurt Fuß
- Karl Hellmer as Nowak
- Robert Meyn as Polizeipräsident von Jagow
- Otto Wernicke as Schuhmachermeister
- Ludwig Linkmann as Betrunkener Zivilist
- Wolfgang Müller
- Rudolf Fenner as Polizeioberwachtmeister in Potsdam
- Reinhard Kolldehoff as Drunken soldier
- Kurt Klopsch as Polizei-Inspektor von Köpenick
- Helmut Gmelin as Kürassier-Oberst
- Reinhold Nietschmann
- Jutta Zech
- Jochen Blume as Paß-Kommissar
- Peter Ahrweiler as Anstaltsgeistlicher
- Jochen Meyn as Von Schleinitz
- Werner Schumacher as 2.Gefreiter
- Joachim Hess as 1.Gefreiter
- Balduin Baas as Ostpreußischer Grenadier
- Peter Franz
- Joachim Wolff as 2.Bahnbeamter
- Erich Weiher as Dorfschulze
- Holger Hagen as Dr. Jellinek
- Eddi Thomalla as 1. Bahnbeamter

== Awards ==
- Nominated for the 29th Academy Awards in the category Best Foreign Language Film
- Bundesfilmpreis (Filmband in Gold) in the categories Best Actor, Best Director, Best Screenplay and Best Film Architecture
- Bundesfilmpreis (Filmband in Silber) in the category Best Film Promoting Democracy
- Bundesfilmpreis (Goldene Schale) in the category Best Feature Film
- Bambi in the categories Best Film and Most Commercially Successful Film
- Preis der deutschen Filmkritik
- Price of the Berlin Film Critics Association for Heinz Rühmann
- Special Merit recognition by the Filmbewertungsstelle Wiesbaden
- Screened at the Venice Film Festival, the Edinburgh International Film Festival and the San Francisco International Film Festival

== See also ==
- Wilhelm Voigt
- Der Hauptmann von Köpenick (disambiguation)
- List of submissions to the 29th Academy Awards for Best Foreign Language Film
- List of German submissions for the Academy Award for Best Foreign Language Film
- The Captain from Köpenick (1926 film)
- The Captain from Köpenick (1931 film)
- The Captain from Köpenick (1945 film)
- Der Hauptmann von Köpenick (1997 film)
