= Hémecht =

- Discipline: History of Luxembourg
- Language: German; French; English

Publication details
- Former names: Ons Hémecht (1895–1939); T'Hémecht (1948–1964)
- History: Since 1895
- Publisher: Imprimerie Saint-Paul; Editions Office Services S.A. (Luxembourg)
- Frequency: Quarterly

Standard abbreviations
- ISO 4: Hémecht

Indexing
- ISSN: 0018-0270

Links
- Journal homepage

Hémecht. Revue d'histoire luxembourgeoise - Zeitschrift für Luxemburger Geschichte (English: Homeland: Periodical of Luxembourgish history), originally known as Ons Hémecht (Our Homeland), is an academic journal of Luxembourgish history. Published since 1895, the journal is published bilingually (in German and French) with some contributions in English.

== History ==
Ons Hémecht was founded in 1895 by Martin Blum and Charles Müllendorff as the journal of the Verein für Luxemburger Geschichte, Literatur und Kunst (Association for Luxembourgish History, Literature, and Art). Early issues of the journal focused mainly on local village and parish history, as well as the Luxembourgish language: several members of the journal's board contributed to the publishing of the first Luxembourgish dictionary in 1907. The journal was published consistently until 1939. It remained defunct throughout the German occupation of Luxembourg (May 1940 to 1945) and into the post-war period.

The journal was relaunched in 1948 under the title T'Hémecht under the coordination of historian Albert Steffen. In 1963, the journal was renamed to its current title, Hémecht. From 1963 to 1983 it appeared under the editorship of Joseph Maertz, and from 1983 to 2011 under Paul Margue. From January 2012, the editorship was assumed by a larger editorial board, which initially consisted of Paul Dostert, Norbert Franz, Sonja Kmec and Michel Pauly.

Currently, the journal is published quarterly, with a focus on the history and culture of Luxembourg and the Greater Region; in addition to articles on local history, it also features summaries of doctoral and masters theses on related topics, as well as book reviews.

The journal was sometimes criticized as being conservative or nationalist: for example, in a 2011 article for D'Lëtzebuerger Land, journalist Romain Hilgert described the journal as "conservative and God-fearing" ("konservativ und gottesfürchtig"). In 2006, the journal's then-publishing house, Imprimerie Saint-Paul, publicly distanced itself from a critical article published in Hémecht by historian Denis Scuto. Following this, the journal shifted its focus to what was described by the weekly newspaper Woxx as "less ideologically-driven contributions" ("weniger ideologisch ausgerichteten Beiträgen").

In 2020, within the context of the COVID-19 pandemic, the National Library of Luxembourg began the process of digitizing all issues of the journal from 1895 to 2015, which were made accessible on the web portal of the library, eluxemburgensia. Further volumes continue to be digitized with a two-year embargo.

As of 2026, the journal's editing committee comprises Andrea Binsfeld, Paul Dostert, Gilles Genot, Fabienne Gilbertz, Sonja Kmec, Jean-Marie Majerus, Claudine Moulin, and Michel Pauly.

== See also ==
- Digitized editions of Ons Hémecht, 1895–1939, on eluxemburgensia.
- Digitized editions of T'Hémecht and Hémecht, 1948–2022, on eluxemburgensia.
