= The Captain of Koepenick (1941 film) =

1941 film by Richard Oswald

The Captain from Köpenick
- Directed by: Richard Oswald
- Written by: Albright Joseph; Ivan Goff
- Based on: The Captain of Köpenick by Carl Zuckmayer & Albright Joseph
- Produced by: John Hall
- Starring: Albert Bassermann; Mary Brian; Eric Blore; Herman Bing
- Cinematography: John Alton
- Edited by: Dorothy Spencer
- Music by: Daniel Amfitheatrof
- Production companies: John Hall Productions, Inc. (filmed at Talisman Studios)
- Distributed by: Film Classics, Inc. and Producers Releasing Corporation
- Release date: January 1, 1945
- Running time: 71 minutes
- Country: United States
- Language: English
- Budget: U$350,000

The Captain from Köpenick, also known as I Was a Criminal and Passport to Heaven, is a 1945 American film drama directed by Richard Oswald and based upon the 1931 play The Captain of Köpenick by Carl Zuckmayer and Albright Joseph. The play was based on the true story of Wilhelm Voigt, a German ex-convict who masqueraded as a Prussian military officer in 1906 and became famous as the Captain of Köpenick.

The Captain from Köpenick was Oswald's second film version of the story; the first was a 1931 German film also called The Captain from Köpenick. In the intervening years Oswald had fled Nazi Germany for France, then the United States; this was his first American film. It was completed in 1941, but due to difficulty finding a distributor, it was not released until 1945.

== Plot ==
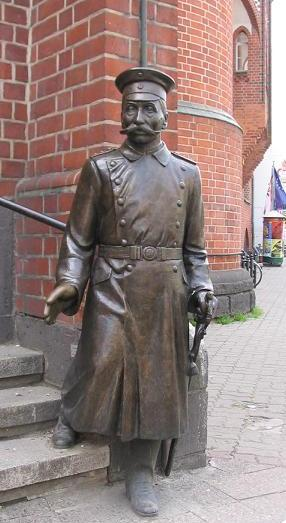
A statue of Wilhelm Voigt as the Captain of Köpenick at Köpenick city hall

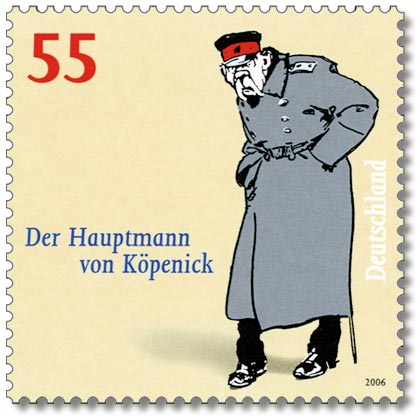
German postage stamp, 2006

Shoemaker Wilhelm Voigt is released from prison after many years of hard labor. His freedom is new to him, and as he tries to navigate this strange new world, he promptly finds himself in the midst of a Prussian catch-22: To get a residence permit (passport), he must have a job, but he can only get a job if he has a residence permit. No one in the Prussian-German bureaucracy feels compelled to help him; everything must go by the book. Out of desperation, Voigt breaks into a police station to forge the much-needed permit and escape the vicious circle.

Unfortunately, Voigt is caught and again has to spend many more years behind bars. The prison's warden subjects the prisoners to the whims of his militarism. The warden loves everything military and has the prisoners re-enact famous battles. When Voigt is released, he still does not have his permit, but now he has a deep knowledge of military uniforms, military ranks, and military speak that he can use to his advantage. In Berlin, he buys and wears a used captain's uniform, then marches towards a platoon of soldiers standing guard and commands them to immediately follow him to Köpenick, a suburb of Berlin. He is so convincing that they actually do! When they arrive, he has the soldiers stage a coup-like takeover of the town hall so he can commandeer his much sought-after permit, but is informed by the staff the permits are now only issued in Berlin. After he pockets all of the cash in the municipal treasury, he orders his soldiers to take the train back to their original posts in Berlin and then absconds with the cash.

When Voigt sees wanted posters offering a reward for the capture of the perpetrator of the Koepenick Caper, he goes to the chief of police, confesses, and returns all the money. The police in the station all erupt in fits of laughter, offer him drinks, and congratulate him for the best practical joke they have ever heard of. Voigt is now famous and even the Kaiser wants to hear his story.

== Cast ==
- Albert Bassermann as shoemaker Wilhelm Voigt
- Mary Brian as Mrs. Obermueller
- Eric Blore as Mayor Obermueller
- Herman Bing as City Hall guardian Kilian
- George Chandler as Kallenberg
- Luis Alberni as prison guard
- Wallis Clark as Friedrich Hoprecht
- Else Bassermann as Mrs. Marie Hoprecht

== Production ==
The American Film Institute quotes PM's Weekly as citing the budget at $350,000.

The Charleston Daily Mail reported that The Captain Of Koepenick is in production a second time, but although "Oswald is attempting to make the film exactly as before ... now none of his German comics can open their mouths without uttering something with a political meaning. They say what they said in 1931, but their every utterance is fraught with ideals. Still, Albert Bassermann plays a captain in uniform magnificently. John Hall is producing the picture and it better be good. Else John Hall, himself, in person, stands to lose a sizeable chunk of his money. So do Messrs. Bassermann, Oswald, et al." ... "You may never see The Captain Of Koepenick, but we hope it's good enough that you will. The manufacturers compose a brave crew."

== Release ==
In his biography of Oswald, Kay Weniger recalled Oswald's problems with shooting good movies in Hollywood: "Of all his films, only his barely screened I Was a Criminal (the U.S. version of his The Captain from Köpenick), with an excellent performance by Albert Bassermann in the leading role, is of any relevance. As U.S. audiences had a hard time relating to themes of Prussian militarism, subservience and lack of democracy, the film went without a distributior for many years and only premiered at the beginning of 1945".

The Captain from Koepenick was screened at the Syracuse Cinefest on 14 March 2013 as Passport to Heaven.

== Critical reception ==
Jan Christopher Horak wrote: "The film is a remarkable achievement for the Director. The Berlin architecture was rendered via documentary footage and studio sets, and the camera uses movement through light and shadow to bring the symbols of power again and again into the picture: In one setting, shadows transform the omnipresent image of the emperor into a portrait of the Führer. Alas, the story of a simple shoemaker [...] up against the Prussian mentality of authoritarian militarism and bureaucratic obedience, the desperation of the permitless worker rejected over and over, all these were foreign to pre-war America in 1941. [...] Unlike Max Adalbert (1931) and Heinz Rühmann (1956) who played the shoemaker as the "little guy", ... Bassermann is angry, always rebelling and defying the powers that be, channelling his own experience as a Nazi exile: A powerful performance, making this film perhaps the most German of all exile films.“

== See also ==
- The Captain from Köpenick (1926 film)
- The Captain from Köpenick (1931 film)
- The Captain from Köpenick (1956 film)
- Der Hauptmann von Köpenick (1997 film)
