= The Blockhead =

1921 film

- Directed by: Lupu Pick
- Written by: Ludwig Fulda (play); Carl Mayer
- Produced by: Lupu Pick
- Starring: Max Adalbert; Otto Treptow; Eugen Rex
- Cinematography: Friedrich Weinmann
- Production company: Rex-Film
- Release date: 7 January 1921
- Country: Germany
- Languages: Silent; German intertitles

The Blockhead (German: Der Dummkopf) is a 1921 German silent film directed by Lupu Pick and starring Max Adalbert, Otto Treptow, and Eugen Rex.

== Cast ==
- Max Adalbert as Amadeu Beck
- Otto Treptow as Kurt Engelhardt
- Eugen Rex as Willibad Beck
- Hans Fischer as Gerhard Beck
- Paul Heidemann as Justus Haeberlin
- Rosa Valetti as Madame Schirmar
- Else Eckersberg as Lisbeth
- Ruth von Wedel as Doris Wiegand
- Editha Seidel as Lucie Hensel
- Fritz Richard as Amtsgerichtsrat
- Fritz Friedrich as Diener
- Lupu Pick as Dr. Thilenius
- Wilhelm Diegelmann
- Frida Richard
- Alice Torning

== Bibliography ==
- Rentschler, Eric, ed. (2013). German Film and Literature: Adaptations and Transformations. Hoboken: Taylor & Francis. ISBN 978-1-136-36873-8.
