= Martin Blum =

- Born: June 13, 1845; Pfaffenthal, Luxembourg City, Luxembourg
- Died: January 20, 1924 (aged 78); Luxembourg City, Luxembourg
- Occupations: Historian, Catholic priest

Martin Blum (13 June 1845 – 20 January 1924) was a Luxembourgish priest and historian.

In October 1894, he founded the Verein für Geschichte, Literatur und Kunst "Ons Hémecht" (lit. the "Ons Hémecht" Association for History, Literature and Art) which promoted the study of Luxembourgish culture and history. From January 1895 until his death in 1924, Blum was responsible for editing the association's journal, Ons Hémecht.

Blum also completed the first bibliography of literature published in Luxembourg or in the Luxembourgish language. He further published approximately 150 articles on subjects of Luxembourgish literature, history, and culture.

Following Blum's death, his books were acquired by the library of the Grand Seminary of Luxembourg; these items later formed the basis of the Luxemburgensia collection of the National Library of Luxembourg.

== Bibliography ==
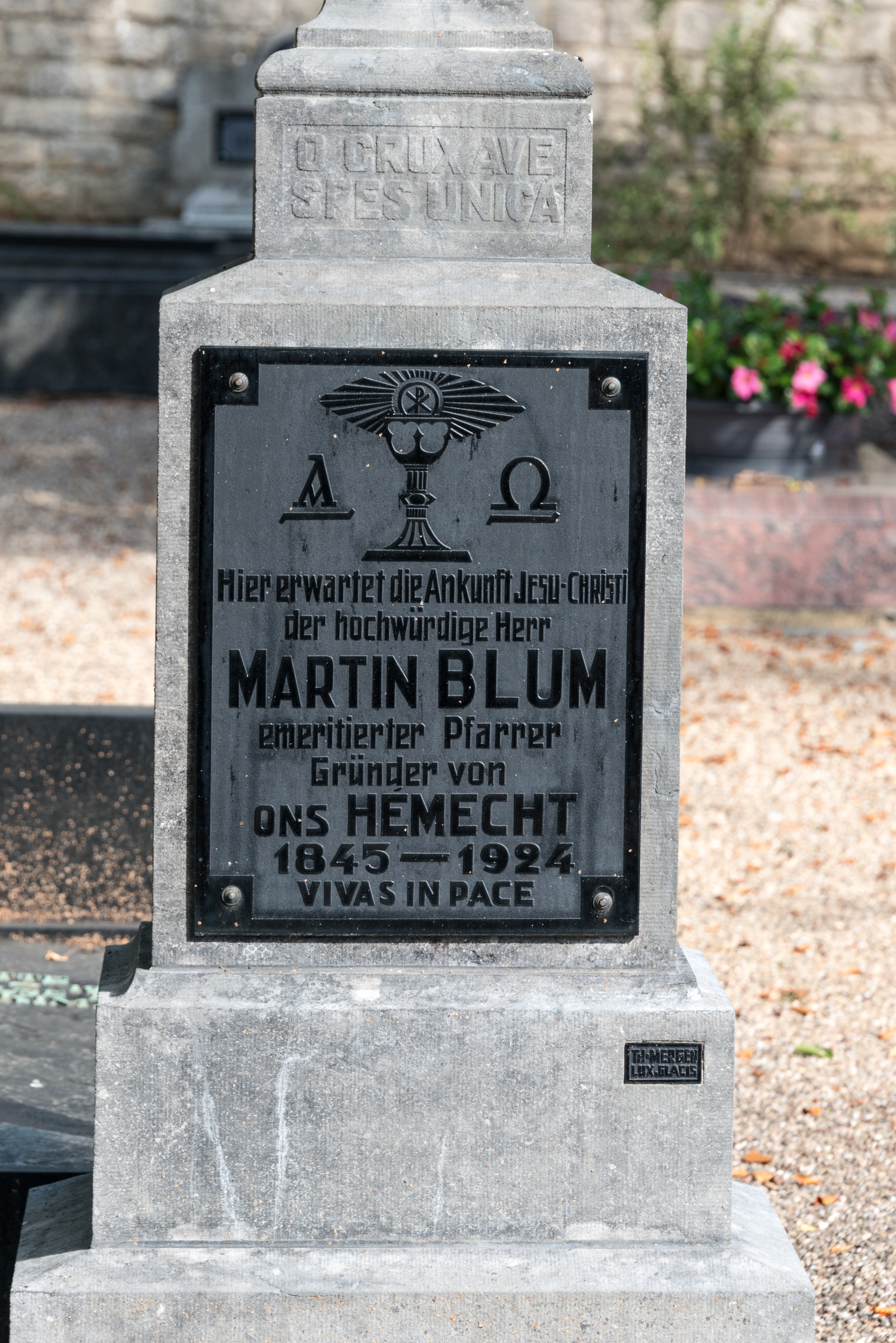
Blum's grave at Notre-Dame Cemetery, Luxembourg City.

Martin Blum was born in Pfaffenthal, Luxembourg City to the joiner Martin Blum and Catherine Scheidt on 13 June 1845. When Blum was two years old, he moved with his parents to the Ville Haute, where they ran a café on the Rue de la Reine.

Martin Blum was ordained a Roman Catholic priest on 27 August 1869, and began to serve as vicar in Bettembourg. In 1872 he became chaplain in Niederfeulen, and thereafter served as pastor in Nagem (1876), Heffingen (1887), Mensdorf (1891), and Greisch (1898).

Following his retirement in 1903, Blum lived in Hollerich for two years. He then moved to the centre of Luxembourg City, where he lived on the Lantergässel (Rue Génistre), just off of the Place d'Armes, and served as a beneficent to the nearby Cathedral.

Martin Blum died on 20 January 1924 at the age of 78. He is buried in the Notre-Dame Cemetery (also known as St. Nicholas Cemetery) in Limpertsberg.

On 7 June 2024, following the initiative of local historian John Feller, a square in front of the cultural centre in Mensdorf, where Blum served as pastor during the early days of Ons Hémecht, was renamed Place Martin Blum in his honour.

== Selected works ==
- Bibliographie luxembourgeoise ou catalogue raisonné de tous les ouvrages ou travaux littéraires publiés par les Luxembourgeois ou dans le Grand-Duché de Luxembourg. 1902-1932.

== Orders ==
- Knight of the Order of the Oak Crown.
