= Battle of Barking Creek =

Friendly fire aviation incident in 1939

Coordinates: 51.528200°N 0.079500°E

- Part of the Western Front of the Second World War
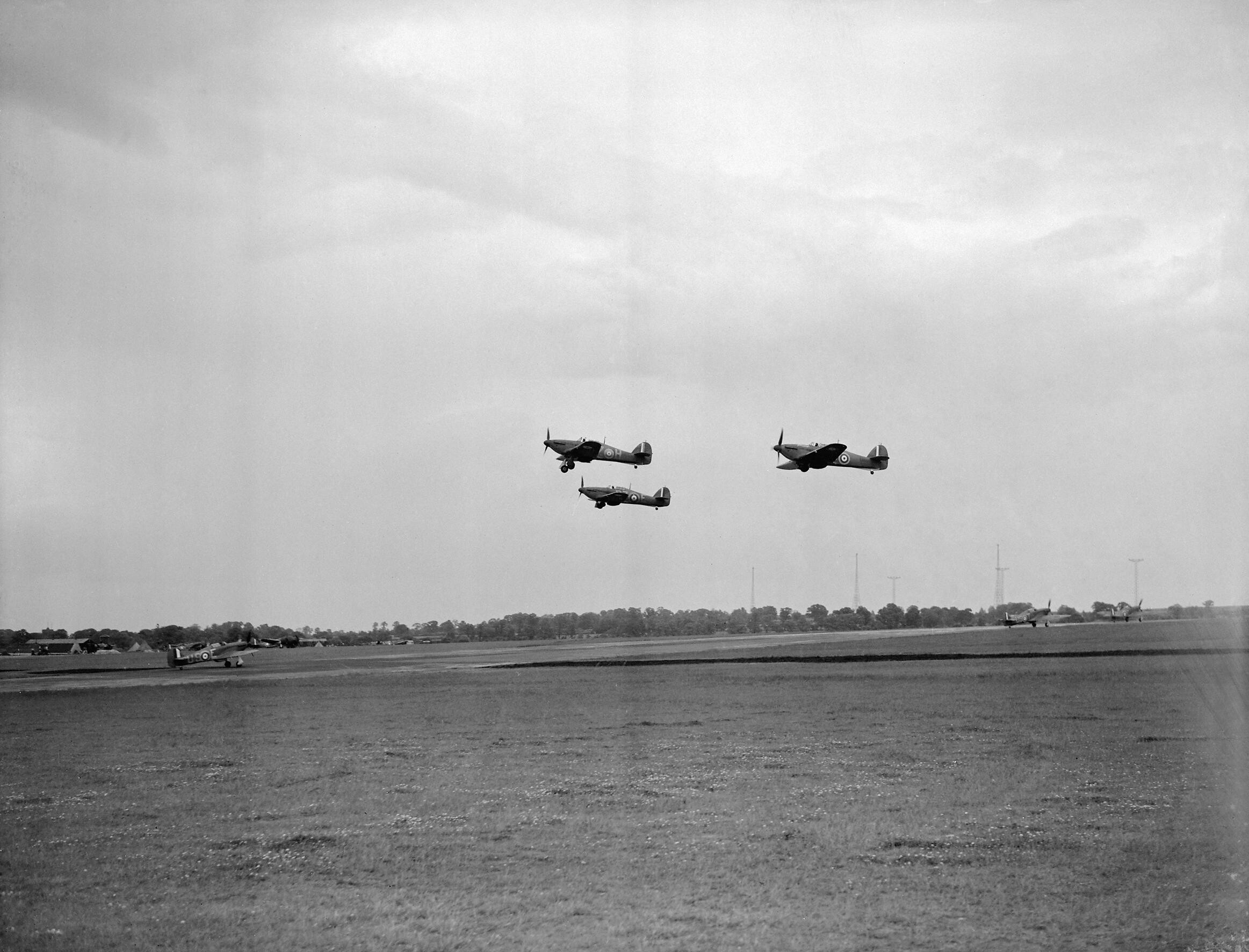
- A flight of No. 151 Squadron Hurricanes, a squadron involved in the incident, taking off from RAF North Weald
Date	6 September 1939
Location	Barking Creek, Essex, England
Result	2 Hurricane fighters destroyed, 1 pilot killed

The Battle of Barking Creek was a friendly fire incident over the East Coast of England in the earliest days of the Second World War. On 6 September 1939, aircraft from several 11 Group, RAF Fighter Command squadrons, were scrambled to intercept German aircraft detected by radar (RDF) flying towards the English coast. The radar plots were reflections of British aircraft flying inland. Spitfire fighters sent to intercept shot down two Hurricanes in error, killing one of the pilots, the first death of a British fighter pilot in the war.

== Events ==
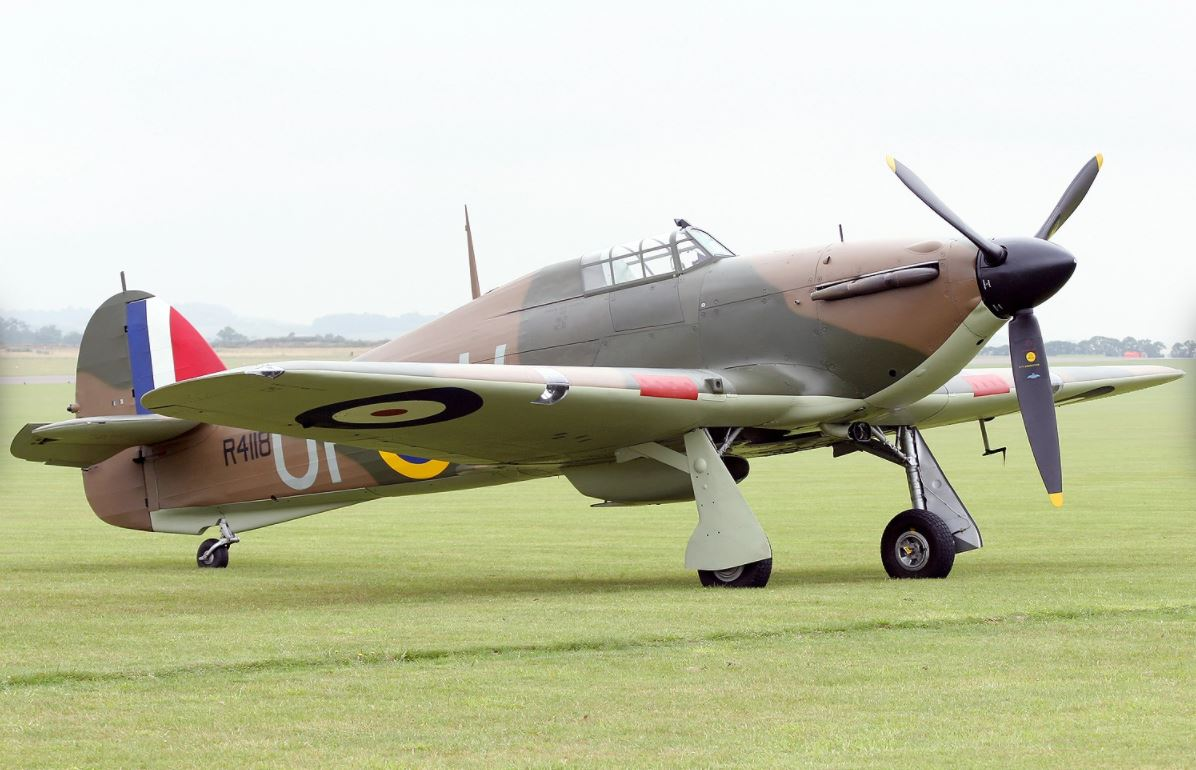
Hawker Hurricane Mk I

At 6:15 a.m. on 6 September 1939, a radar fault led to a false alarm that unidentified aircraft were approaching from the east at high altitude over West Mersea, on the Essex coast. Misleading back-signals giving a reciprocal bearing were obviated by relay sensors but early in the war this back cut-off failed. Coastal radar stations could misinterpret radar returns from inland flights as aircraft flying towards England. 11 Group, Fighter Command, ordered six Hurricanes to be scrambled from 56 Squadron, based at North Weald in Essex. The sector controller, Group Captain David Lucking, sent up all 14 aircraft. Unbeknown to the rest of the pilots, two pilot officers took up a pair of reserve aircraft and followed at a distance.

Hurricanes from 151 Squadron (also from North Weald) and Spitfires from 54 Squadron, 65 Squadron and 74 Squadron based at Hornchurch scrambled. None of the Royal Air Force pilots had been in action and few had seen a German aircraft. Communication between the pilots and ground control was poor and there was no procedure for pilots to distinguish between RAF and Luftwaffe aircraft. Identification friend or foe (IFF) sets were still being developed and had not been installed in many RAF aircraft.

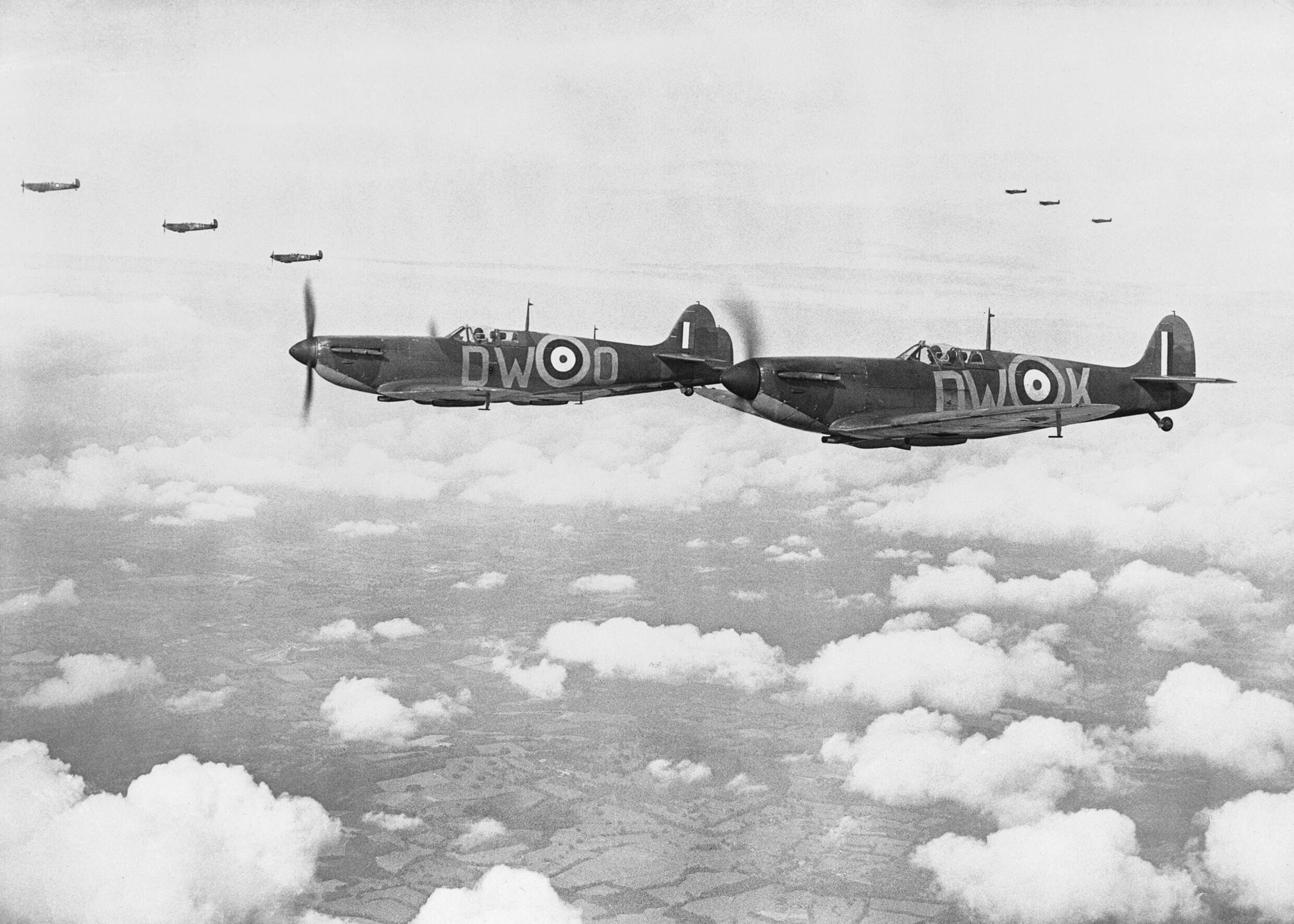
Supermarine Spitfire Mark Is on 24 July 1940.

With everyone in the air expecting to see German aircraft and no experience of having done so, 'A' Flight of 74 Squadron saw what they believed were German aircraft and their commander, Adolph "Sailor" Malan, allegedly gave an order to engage. Two of the three, Flying Officer Vincent 'Paddy' Byrne and Pilot Officer John Freeborn, opened fire. Malan later claimed to have given a last-minute call of "friendly aircraft – break away!" but if this was true, it was not heard by Byrne and Freeborn. Richard Hough and Denis Richards wrote that further losses were prevented by Squadron Leader Edward Donaldson, the 151 Squadron commanding officer, who alerted his pilots that the attacking aircraft were British and gave the order not to retaliate.

Frank Rose and Pilot Officer Montague Hulton-Harrop were shot down, Hulton-Harrop being killed. Fired upon by John Freeborn, he had been hit in the back of the head and was dead before his Hurricane crashed at Manor Farm, Hintlesham, Suffolk, about 5 mi (8.0 km) west of Ipswich. Hulton-Harrop was the first British pilot killed in action in the war and his Hurricane was the first aircraft shot down by a Spitfire.

== Aftermath ==
=== Court martial ===
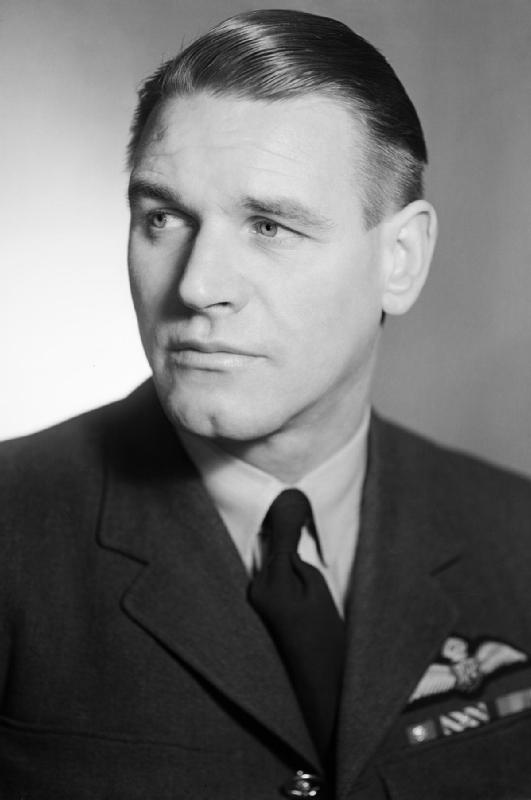
A. G. 'Sailor' Malan

The court martial of John Freeborn and Paddy Byrne was heard in camera at Bentley Priory, the headquarters of Fighter Command. In 2019, The National Archives released some records, including the Operations Record Books of the fighter squadrons and certain court documents. The court martial transcript has not been released. According to Bill Nasson in 2009, it is well known that Freeborn felt that Sailor Malan tried to evade responsibility for the attack. Malan gave evidence against his pilots, stating that Freeborn had been irresponsible, impetuous and had not taken proper heed of vital communications. During the trial, Freeborn's counsel, Sir Patrick Hastings, called Malan a bare-faced liar.

The court exonerated both pilots, ruling that the case was an unfortunate accident. In 1990, Hough and Richards wrote,

This tragic shambles, hushed up at the time, was dubbed in the RAF 'the Battle of Barking Creek' – a place several miles from the shooting-down but one which, like Wigan Pier, was a standing joke in the music halls.

In 2003, Patrick Bishop wrote that the incident exposed the inadequacies of RAF radar and identification procedures, leading to their being greatly improved by the time of the Battle of Britain, a view echoed in a 2012 publication by Philip Kaplan.

=== Careers ===
John Freeborn

Montague Hulton-Harrop is buried with a war grave headstone at St Andrew's Church in North Weald. Lucking was an engineering officer who was in the General Duties Branch and was returned to engineering duties later that month as OC (Officer Commanding) 32 MU. He was transferred to the new Technical Branch in 1940 and was promoted to air commodore in December 1941. He died in 1970, aged 75. Frank Rose was killed in action over Vitry-en-Artois, France, on 18 May 1940. Malan went on to be one of the most successful Allied fighter pilots of the war, shooting down 27 Luftwaffe aircraft and rising to group captain. Malan received the Distinguished Service Order and bar and the Distinguished Flying Cross. On his return to South Africa he worked against the apartheid regime until his death in 1963.

Paddy Byrne was shot down and captured over France in 1940. He was imprisoned at Stalag Luft III with his former defence lawyer Roger Bushell. In 1944 he was repatriated, having convinced the Germans and the repatriation board that he was insane. On his return to England he was unable to be reinstated into the RAF and was given a ground position; he could not return to action because of his repatriation on medical grounds and served as a liaison officer for returning POWs and subsequently in the Far East on Lady Mountbatten's staff. John Freeborn flew more operational hours in the Battle of Britain than any other pilot, remained on operations for the rest of the war and proved to be an outstanding airman. He was awarded the Distinguished Flying Cross and bar and rose to wing commander. Freeborn finally told some of his version of events in a 2002 biography A Tiger's Tale, before co-authoring a more complete account in Tiger Cub. In 2009, Freeborn told an interviewer of his regret about Hulton-Harrop's death, saying, "I think about him nearly every day. I always have done... I've had a good life, and he should have had a good life too".

== See also ==
- Air attack on the fortress of Koepenick
- Friendly fire incidents of World War II

== Bibliography ==
=== Books ===
- Bishop, Patrick (2004). Fighter Boys (4th ed.). London: Harper Perennial. ISBN 978-0-00-653204-0.
- Blandford, Edmund (2001) [1999]. Fatal Decisions: Errors and Blunders in World War II. Book Sales. ISBN 978-0-7858-1366-8.
- Cossey, Bob (2002). A Tiger's Tale: The Story of Battle of Britain Spitforce ace Wing Commander John Connell Freeborn. Hailsham: J & KH Pub. ISBN 978-1-900511-64-3.
- Hough, Richard; Richards, Denis (1990) [1989]. The Battle of Britain: The Greatest Air Battle of World War II (W. W. Norton, New York ed.). Hodder & Staughton. ISBN 978-0-393-30734-4.
- Kaplan, P. (2012). Sailor: Battle of Britain Legend Adolph Malan. Barnsley, South Yorks: Pen & Sword Books. ISBN 978-1-78383-033-6.
- Mason, Francis K. (1969). Battle over Britain: A History of the German air assaults on Great Britain 1917–1918 and July–December 1940, and of the development of Britain's air defences between the World Wars. London: McWhirter Twins Ltd. ISBN 0-901928-00-3.
- Terraine, J. (1998) [1985]. The Right of the Line: The Royal Air Force in the European War 1939–1945 (Wordsworth ed.). London: Hodder and Stoughton. ISBN 978-1-85326-683-6.
- Yeoman, Christopher; Freeborn, John (2009). Tiger Cub – The Story of John Freeborn DFC* A 74 Squadron Fighter Pilot In WWII. Barnsley: Pen and Sword Aviation. ISBN 978-1-84884-023-2.

=== Journals ===
- Black, Nick (September 2020). "The Battle of Barking Creek". Epoch Magazine (1). Archived from the original on 24 June 2021.
- Miner Haygood, Tamara (2010). "Malingering and Escape: Anglo-American Prisoners of War in World War II Europe" (PDF). War, Literature and the Arts (online ed.). Colorado Springs, CO: Dept. of English of the U.S. Air Force Academy. ISSN 1949-9752. Archived from the original (PDF) on 18 July 2011.
- Nasson, Bill (November 2009). "A Flying Springbok of Wartime British Skies: A. G. 'Sailor' Malan" (PDF). Kronos: Journal of Cape History. 35. University of Western Cape, South Africa: 71–97. ISSN 0259-0190. Archived (PDF) from the original on 18 July 2011.
