= Notre-Dame Cemetery (Luxembourg) =

Cemetery in Luxembourg City

Coordinates: 49.616°N 6.119°E

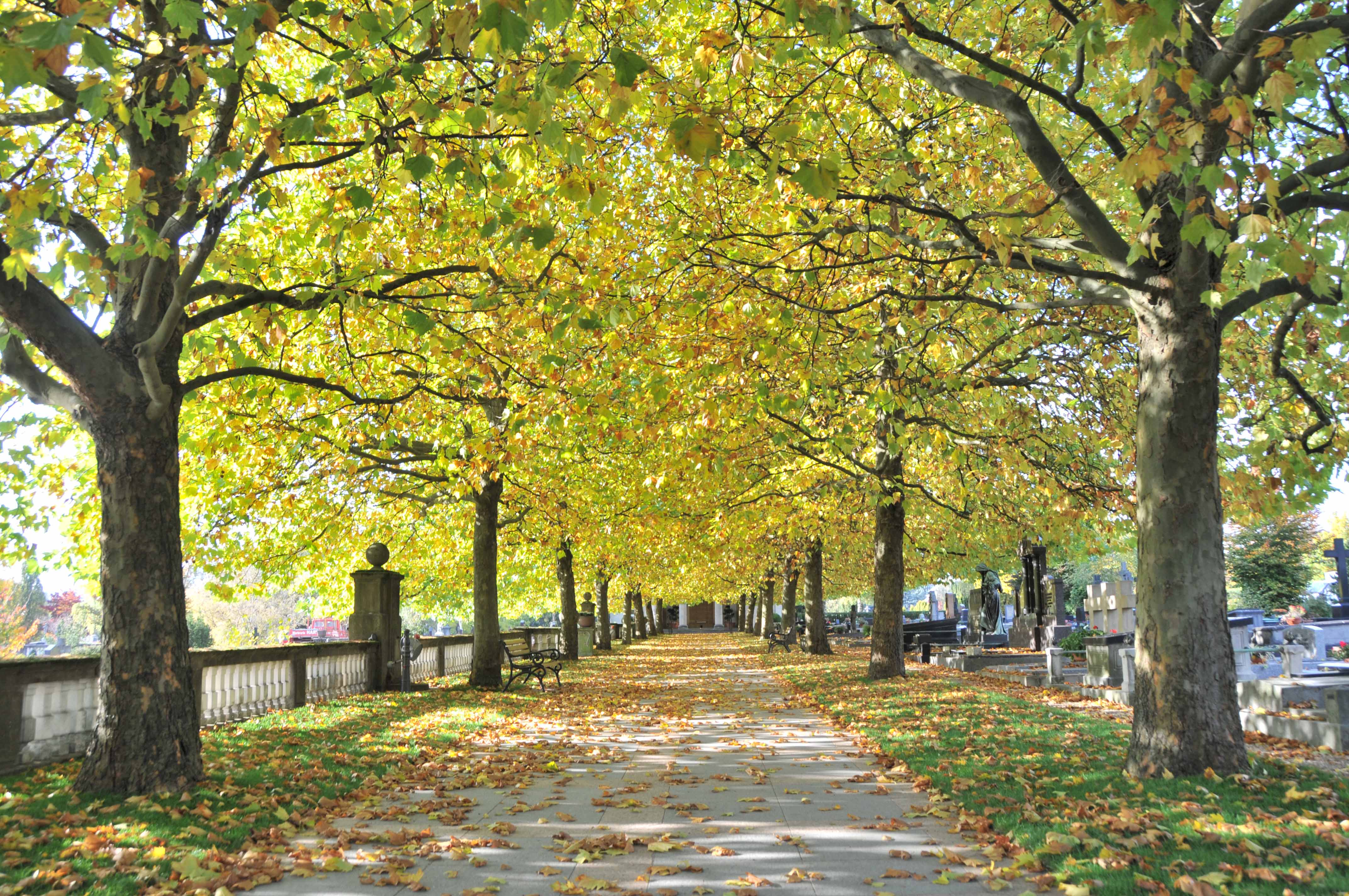
- Interactive map of Notre-Dame Cemetery

Details
- Established: 1780
- Location: Rue Nico Klopp, Limpertsberg, Luxembourg City
- Country: Luxembourg
- Owned by: Luxembourg City
- Size: 13.9916 ha (34.574 acres)

The Notre-Dame Cemetery (French: Cimetière Notre-Dame, German: Liebfrauenfriedhof), commonly known in Luxembourgish as the Nikloskierfecht ("St. Nicholas Graveyard"), is located in the Limpertsberg district of Luxembourg City. It is the largest of the 14 cemeteries and graveyards managed by the Service Cimetières of the City of Luxembourg.

== History ==
After the Church of St. Nicholas in the city centre was torn down, and the seat of the St. Nicholas parish was transferred to the former Jesuit church (now the Cathedral), in 1779 the parish graveyard was moved outside the city walls to the Glacis. This was the origin of the name „Nikloskierfecht“. The new graveyard was on land near the Notre-Dame Chapel (German: Kapelle Unserer Lieben Frau, French: Chapelle Notre-Dame), also called the Neipuertskapell (Luxembourgish for "New Gate Chapel"). This explains the official name of Notre-Dame Cemetery.

The new cemetery was essentially just an extension of a graveyard which had already existed by the chapel since 1691 and where those were buried who had been condemned to death but were not criminals, such as deserters. Two gardens were added to the old graveyard, one of which belonged to the chapel, while the other was the property of the Holy Ghost monastery.

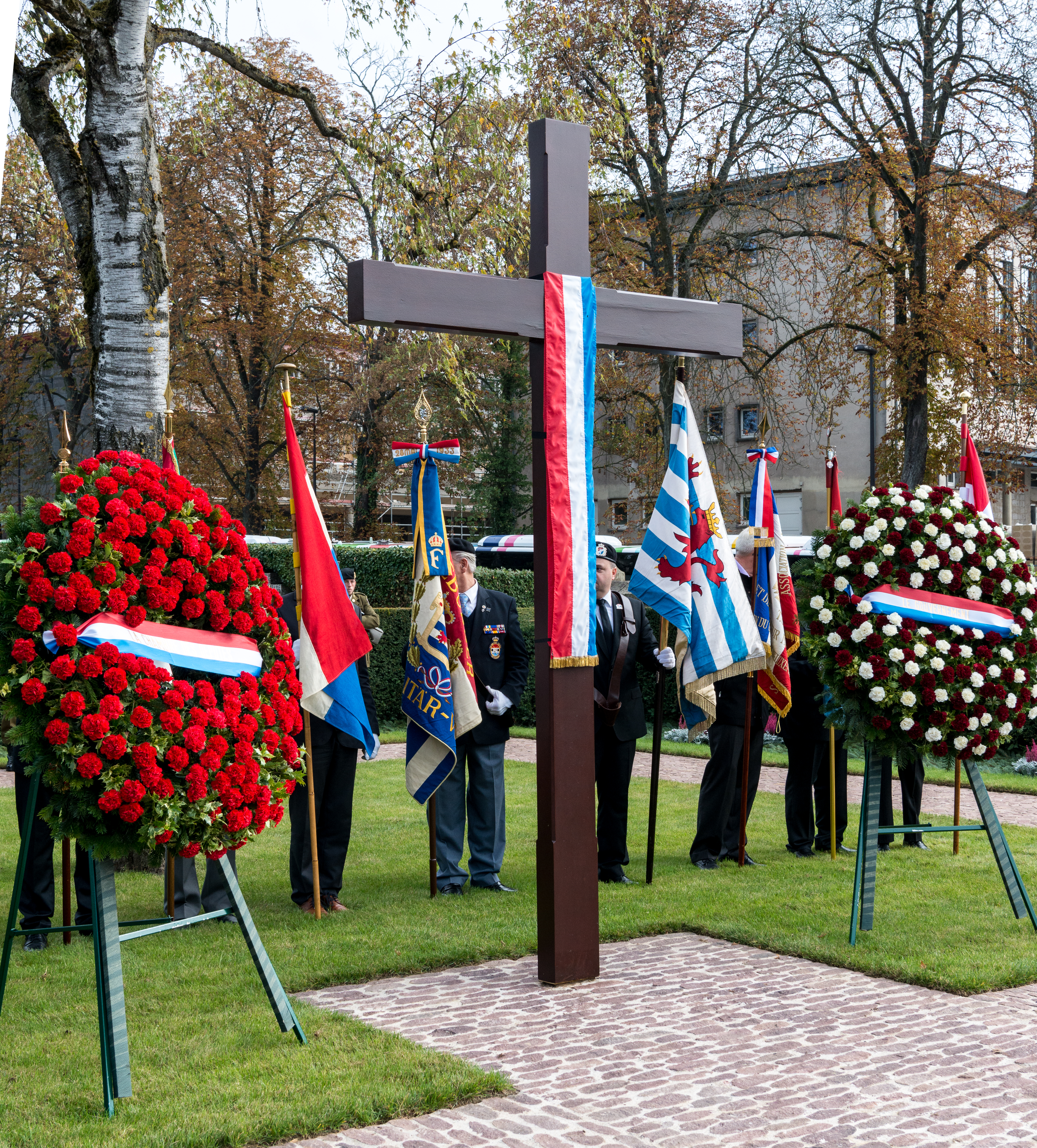
Hinzert Cross

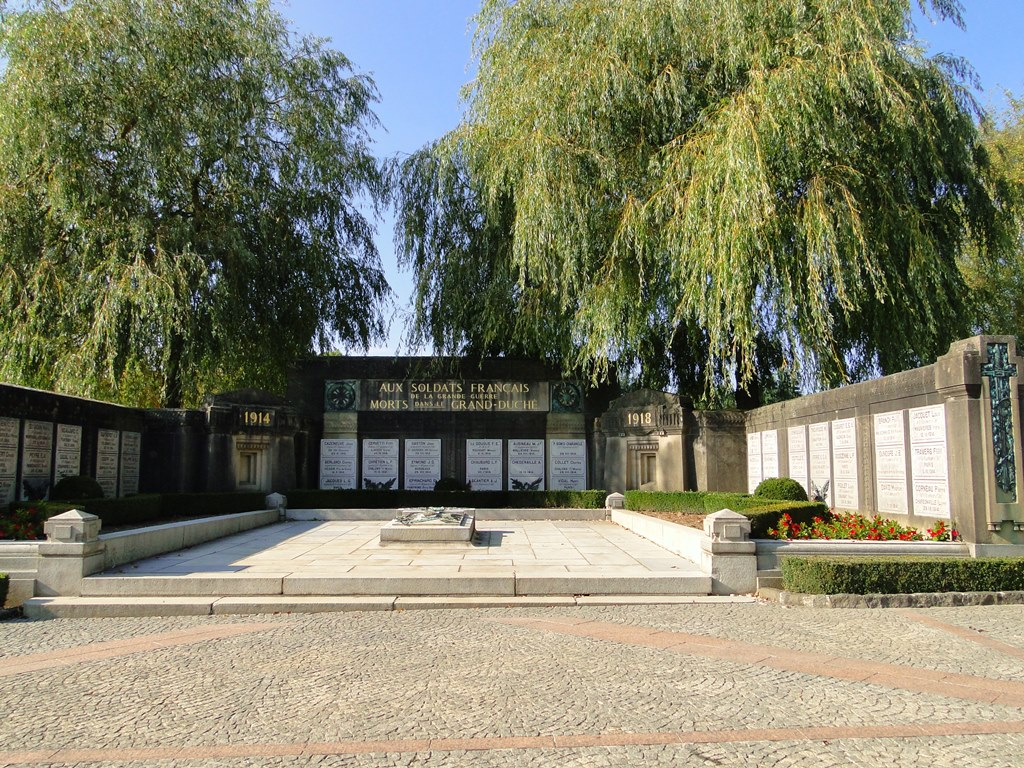
Mausoleum of the French soldiers

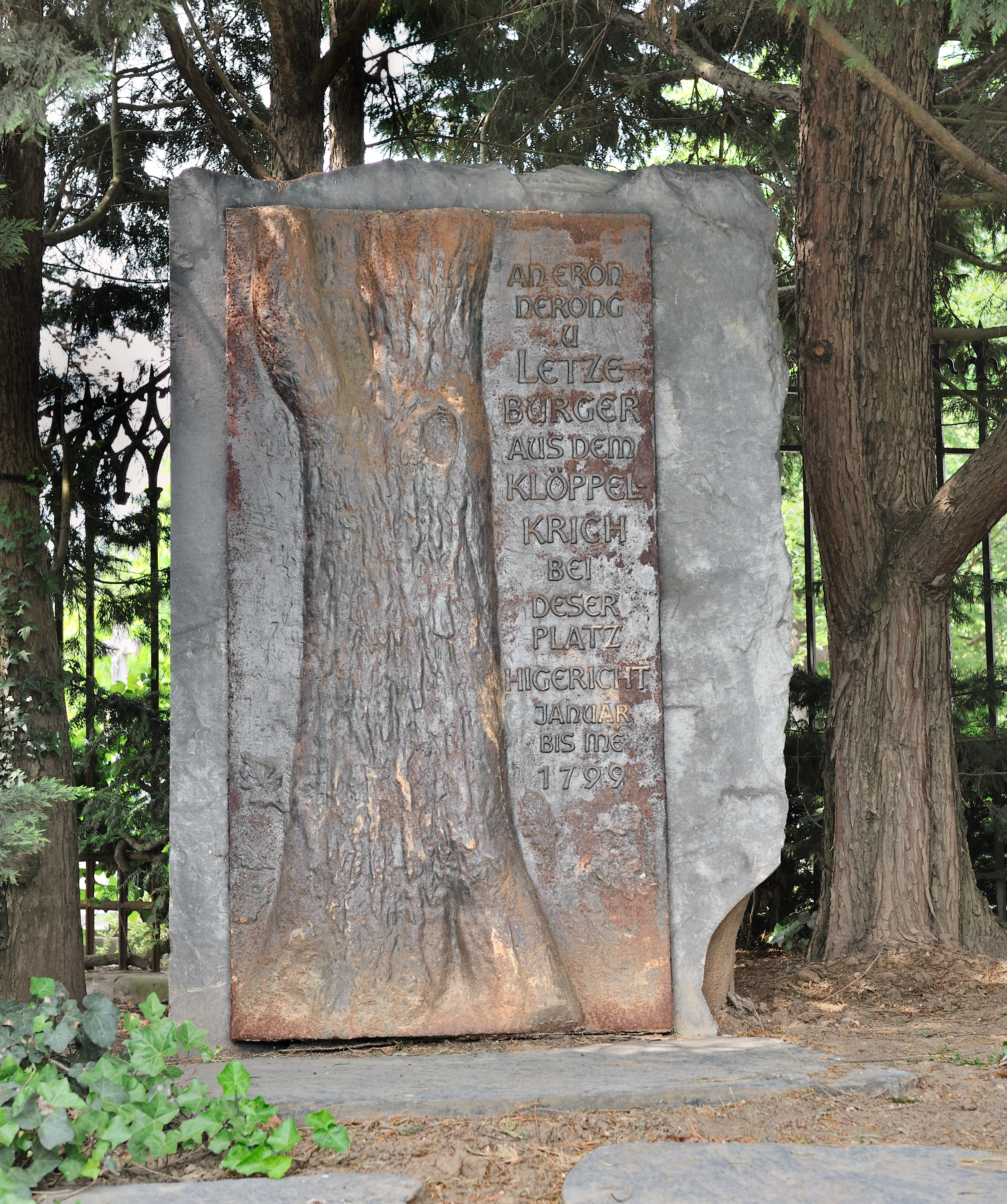
Klëppelkrich monument

== Monuments ==
There are three monuments at the Notre-Dame Cemetery:

- the National Monument of the Resistance and the Deportation, or Monument national de la résistance et de la déportation, usually simply called the "Hinzert Cross" (Luxembourgish: Hinzerter Kraitz)
- the Monument to the Luxembourgish Unknown Legionary and the French Soldiers who died in the Grand-Duchy of Luxembourg in the Great War 1914-1918
- the monument commemorating the “Klëppelkrich”, created by artist François Gillen at the initiative of publisher François Mersch, in collaboration with architect Paul Retter. It was erected in 1971 at the corner of Avenue de la Faïencerie and Allée des Résistants et Déportés. The monument commemorates the execution of 27 “Klëppelkriger” on the glacis of the Porte Neuve. They were opponents of the republican and anticlerical regime, as well as of Luxembourg’s annexation to France as the “Département des Forêts.”

== Notable interments ==
- Charles Bernhoeft (1859-1933), photographer
- Sophie de Bette
- Pierre Blanc (1872-1946), painter
- Martin Blum (1845-1924), priest and historian
- Victor Bodson (1902-1984), politician
- Melchior Bourg-Gemen (1861-1939)
- Thomas Byrne
- Pol Clemen (1861-1925)
- Pierre Clomes
- François-Charles Emmanuel Collin (1790-1851)
- Gérard Cravatte (1900-1967)
- Jules van Damme
- Alexandre Marius Dées de Sterio (1944-2006), professor, journalist
- Gaston Diderich (1884-1946), politician
- Adolphe Eberhard (1896-1941)
- Michel Engels (1851-1901), painter
- Victor Engels (1892-1962), architect and painter
- Eydt-Funck family grave (Jean-François Eydt, Pierre Funck and Paul Funck)
- Paul Eyschen (1841-1915), politician
- Jean-Baptiste Fallize (1844-1933)
- Gaspard-Théodore-Ignace de la Fontaine (1787-1871)
- Léon de la Fontaine
- Jean-Baptiste Gellé (1777-1847)
- Therese Glaesener-Hartmann
- Willy Goergen (1867-1942)
- Bernard Graf (1831-)
- Bernard Groethuysen
- Nicolas Hemmen (1855)
- Ferdinand d'Huart (1857-1919)
- Michel Hülsemann (1885-1955), musician
- Antoine Jans (1868-1933), ceramics painter
- Joseph Junck (1839-1922)
- Auguste Klein (1866-1945)
- Alphonse Kemp (1872-1950), architect
- Jean-Pierre Ker (1900-1951), painter
- Evrard Ketten (1842-1912), horticulturalist
- Ernst Koch (1808-1858), poet
- William J. Kroll (1889-1873)
- Eugène Kurth (1868-1960)
- Guillaume Lefèvre
- Michel Lentz (1833–1893)
- Jean Logeling
- Edouard Luja
- Jean-Pierre Maeysz
- Nicolas Majerus
- Fernand Mertens (1872-1957), composer
- Metz family grave
- Léon Moulin
- Edmond Patzké (1844-1903)
- Antoine and Anne Pescatore-Feltz
- Ferdinand and Marie Joséphine Pescatore
- Charles-Auguste Praum
- Léopold Reichling
- Michel Rodange
- François Roeser
- Eugène Ruppert
- François Scheffer
- Étienne Schmit
- Charles Schmitz (1855-1907)
- Jean Schoenberg
- Nicolas Steffen Pierret (1830-1999)
- Michel Stoffel
- Joseph-Germain Strock
- Gaston Thorn
- Wilhelm Voigt (the "Captain of Köpenick")
- Jupp Wagner
- Batty Weber
- Paul Weber
- Nik Welter
- Lucien Wercollier
- Pierre Werner
- Auguste van Werveke
- Jacques Wester
- Guillaume Weydert
- Jean-Édouard Wolff (1851-1938)
- Henri Woquier (1852–1921
- Jean Worré (1816–1901)
- Jean-Antoine Zinnen
- Ernest Vander Linden
- Albert Jean-Marie Baron Keucker de Watlet

== Gallery ==
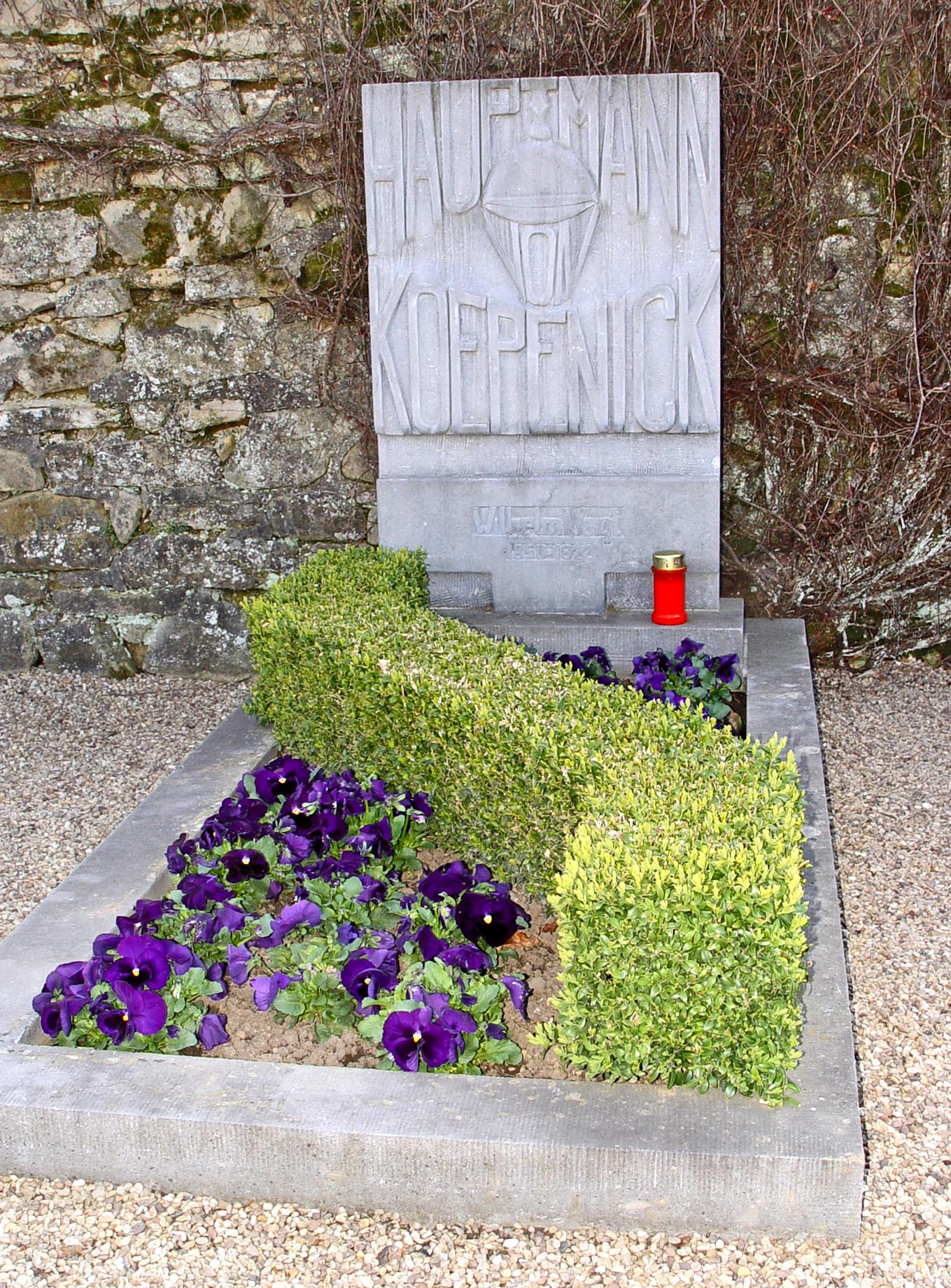
Grave of the "Captain of Köpenick"

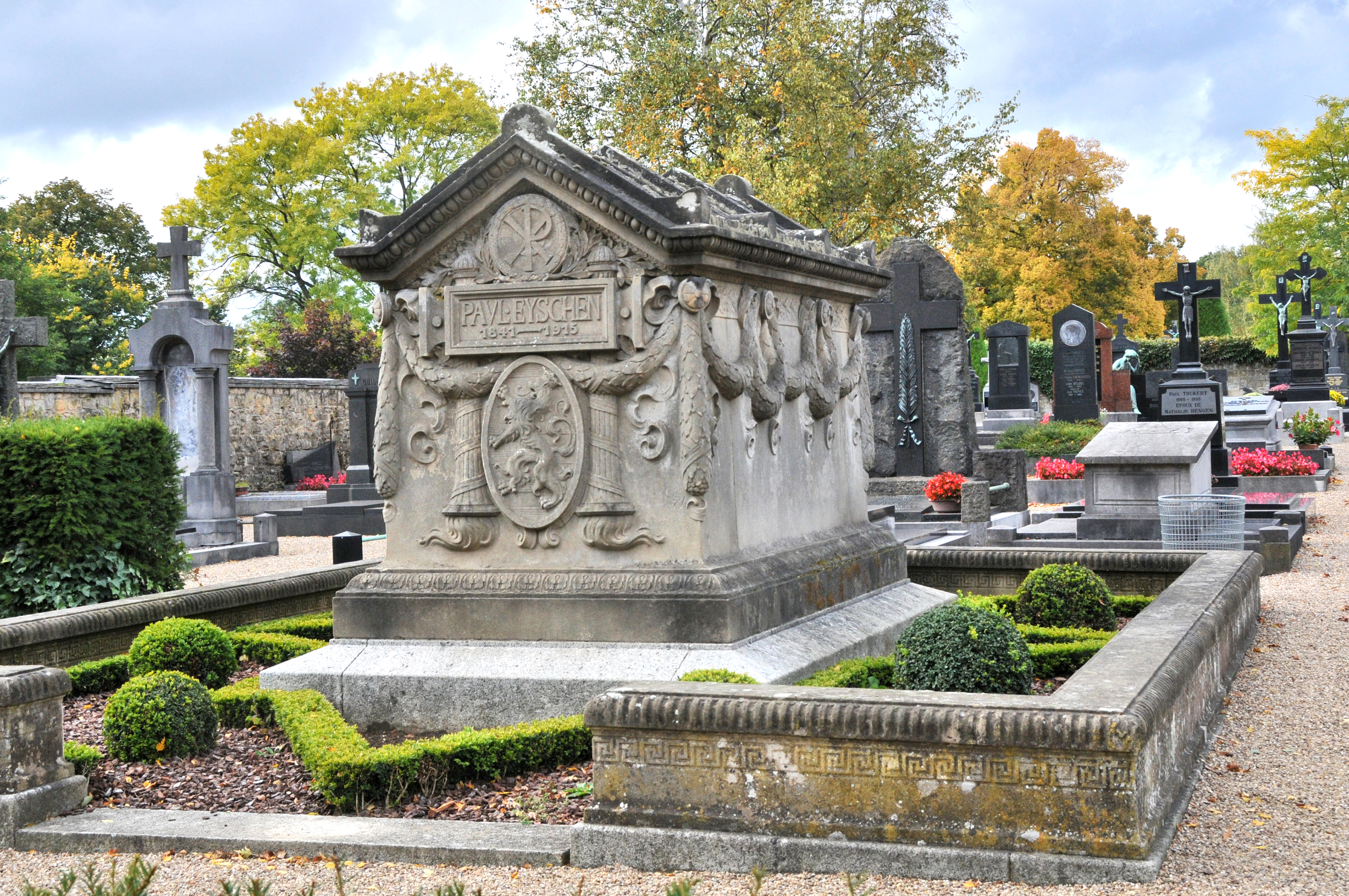
Grave of Paul Eyschen (1841-1915).

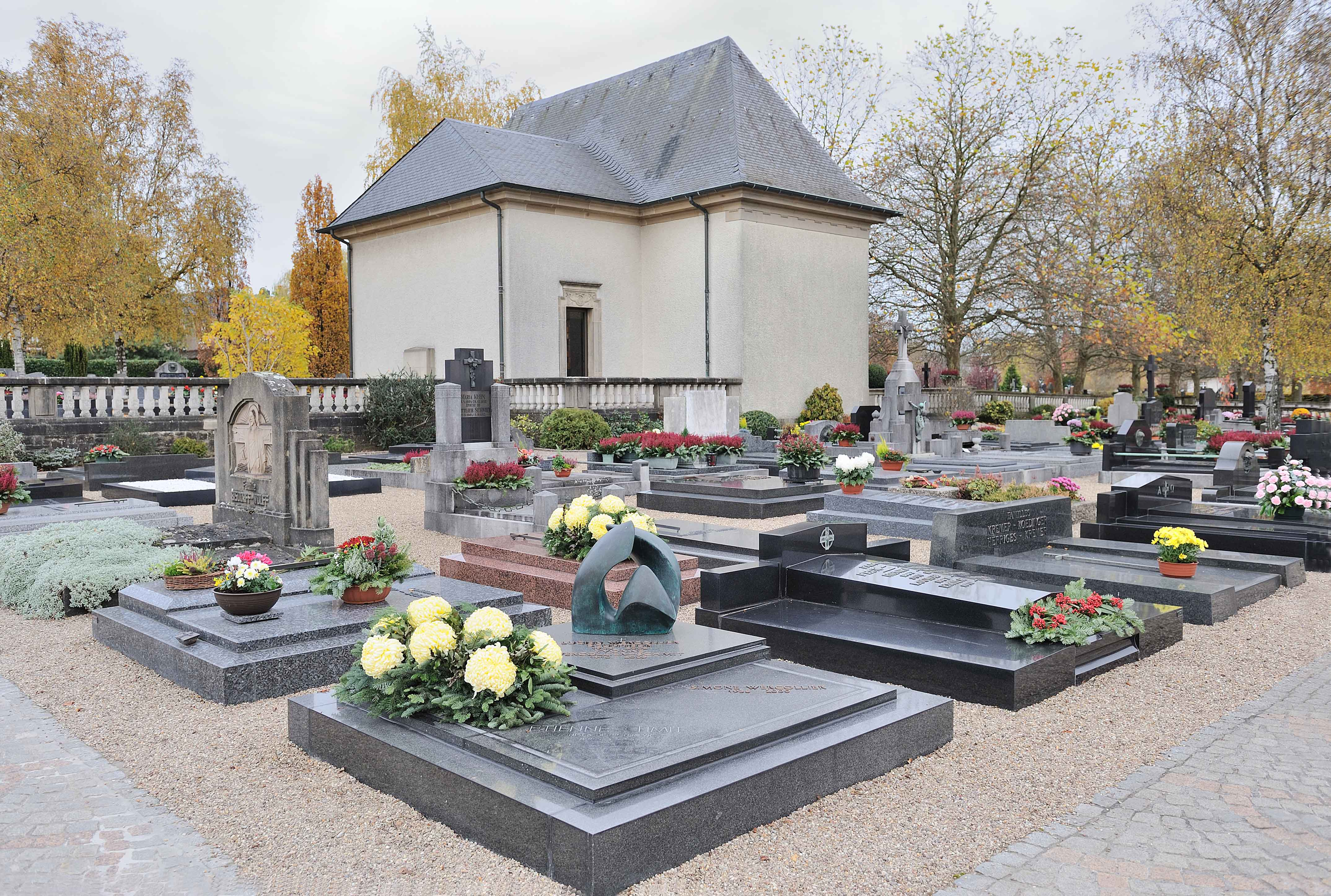
Building where ceremonies take place. Foreground: the grave of Lucien Wercollier.

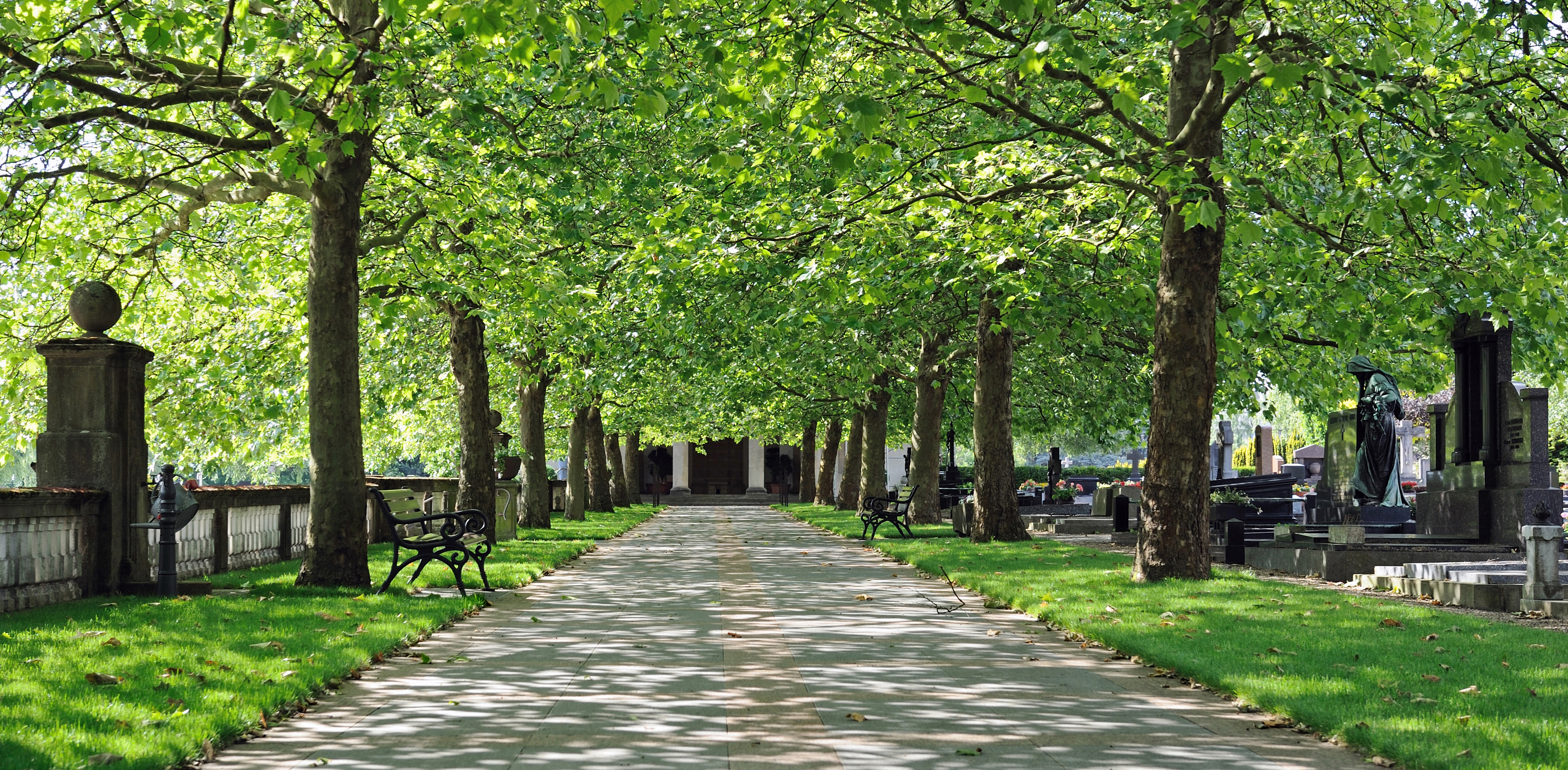
Tree avenue to the ceremonial building.

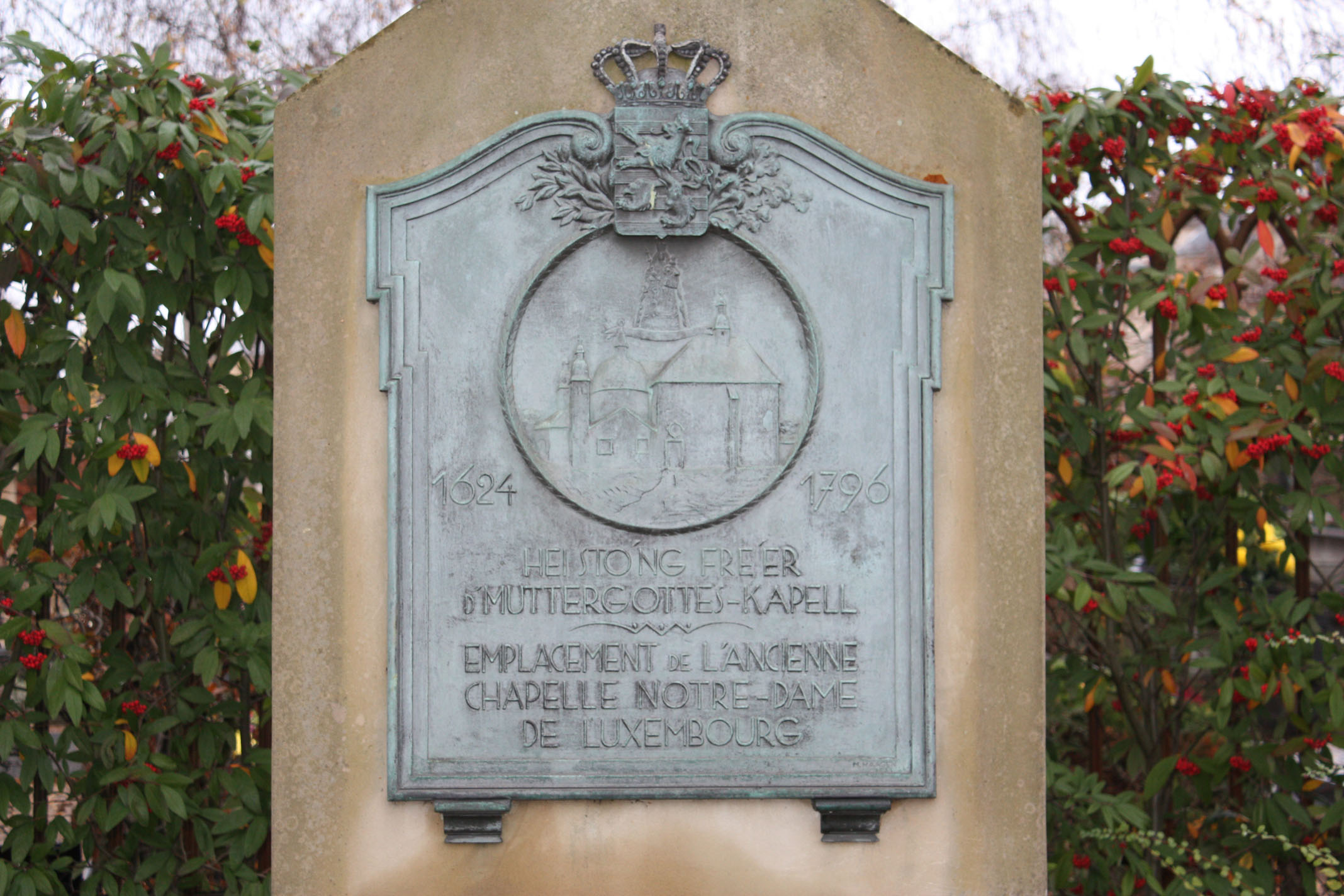
This memorial plaque to the first Glacis chapel (1628-1796) stood at the entrance until the start of the construction works for the tramway
