= Air attack on the fortress of Koepenick =

1943 incident from World War 2

The air attack on the fortress of Koepenick is the sarcastic moniker of an incident in the air war over Germany during World War II. It took place in October 1943 and was an example of target confusion. The US 8th Air Force sent 119 bombers to attack the western town of Düren, but the German air force, Luftwaffe, incorrectly chased a phantom target all the way to Plzeň. When the target failed to materialize, the commander of German defenders, Hermann Göring, sent a sarcastic telegram to all concerned, congratulating them and himself on "the successful defence of the fortress of Koepenick", a reference to the 20th century hoax, Captain of Köpenick.

== Attack ==
On 14 October 1943 the US 8th Air Force attacked the ball bearing factories at Schweinfurt in central Germany, an industry which was seen as a bottleneck in the German industrial manufacturing system. During the Second Schweinfurt raid, the German air defences inflicted many losses on the bombers, but the city and the industry were severely hit. On 20 October, just a week later, the 8th Air Force sent 119 bombers to attack the western town of Düren, near the border city of Aachen, but the German defenders assumed it was really a return to the earlier target.

The Americans reached their target and bombed it, after which they turned for home. At this point German observers reported a large formation of aircraft heading south. In 1973, Alfred Price wrote that this was based on the noise of aircraft, though they were not seen; Adolf Galland attributes this to chaff dropped by the bombers drifting on the wind and registering on German radar.

When it was reported to Hermann Göring, the Luftwaffe leader, the attack on Düren was seen as a ruse and another devastating attack on central Germany was assumed to be underway. The Reichmarschall took command of the air defence and ordered all available fighter aircraft to intercept. As these fighters became airborne and could be heard from the ground or reported by radar, the impression of a huge force of attackers heading south became more pronounced. As they were on the same course as the force that attacked Schweinfurt less than a week before, Göring inferred that this was the target and ordered the fighters to intercept there. As the phantom bombers passed over Schweinfurt without any ill effect, Göring decided that they were heading for Leuna, the synthetic fuel refinery near Leipzig, another sensitive target. When again there was no bombing, Göring suspected an attack on the Škoda Works at Plzeň and diverted the fighters there. By this time, the fighters were running out of fuel and, as the defence system dictated, started to land at the nearest available airfield. As the fighters landed, the attacking force began to melt away. Galland wrote that the sky was clear over Plzeň and ground observers could see there were no bombers, only German fighters. With this, the phantom raid evaporated.

== Aftermath ==
With the disappearance of the threat, Göring freely admitted that the joke was on him, that he had sent the Luftwaffe on a tour of their own airspace and sent an ironic telegram to all concerned congratulating them and himself on "the successful defence of the fortress of Koepenick", a reference to the Captain of Köpenick, a hoax of the early 20th century. Price and Galland pointed out the difficulties of discriminating between friend and foe in confused circumstances; both observed that neither side managed to resolve the problem during the air war.

== See also ==
- Battle of Barking Creek
