= Max Adalbert =

German actor (1874–1933)

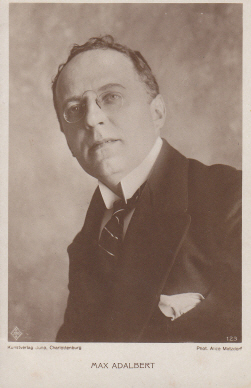
- Born: Johannes Adolph Krampf; 19 February 1874; Danzig, German Empire
- Died: 7 September 1933 (aged 59); Munich, Nazi Germany
- Occupation: Actor
- Years active: 1893–1933

Max Adalbert (born Johannes Adolph Krampf; 19 February 1874 – 7 September 1933) was a German stage and film actor.

== Biography ==
Adalbert was born in Danzig (Gdansk), Imperial Germany as Maximilian Adalbert Krampf to a Prussian Officer. Using his first names as his stage name, he debuted at the age of 19 at the theater of Lübeck and in 1894 at the municipal theater of Barmen. Adalbert also appeared in St.Gallen, Nuremberg and Vienna. He moved to Berlin in 1899 to work at the Residenztheater. Coming in contact with Curt Bois, Adalbert turned into a comedian and co-founded the popular Kabarett der Komiker in December 1924. On 30 May 1931 he made his debut as the central character of Carl Zuckmayer's Der Hauptmann von Köpenick at the Deutsches Theater in Berlin, which was filmed in the same year.

Max Adalbert died of pneumonia while in Munich for a guest performance, and was buried at the Stahnsdorf South-Western Cemetery near Berlin.

== Selected filmography ==
List of acting performances in film and television
Year	Title	Role
1920	Judith Trachtenberg	Fürst Metternich
1921	The Indian Tomb	(Uncredited)
1921	The Golden Bullet	(Uncredited)
1921	Lady Hamilton	drei Lazaronis
1921	Destiny	Schatzmeister
1921	The Story of Christine von Herre	(Uncredited)
1921	The Blockhead	Amadeu Beck
1921	The Kwannon of Okadera	(Uncredited)
1922	Dr. Mabuse the Gambler	(Uncredited)
1923	The Flame	Journalist
1930	Three Days Confined to Barracks	Hoffmann
1931	The Captain from Köpenick	Wilhelm Voigt
1931	My Leopold	Gottlieb Weigelt
1931	Errant Husbands	Dr. Peter Liezow
1931	The Scoundrel	Aldalbert Bulcke
1931	My Heart Longs for Love	Anton Heberlein
1932	The Champion Shot	Funke Sr.
1932	A Mad Idea	Birnstiel
1932	Spies at the Savoy Hotel	Wengert
1933	Laughing Heirs	Justus Bockelmann
