= Wilhelm Voigt =

German impostor (1849–1922)

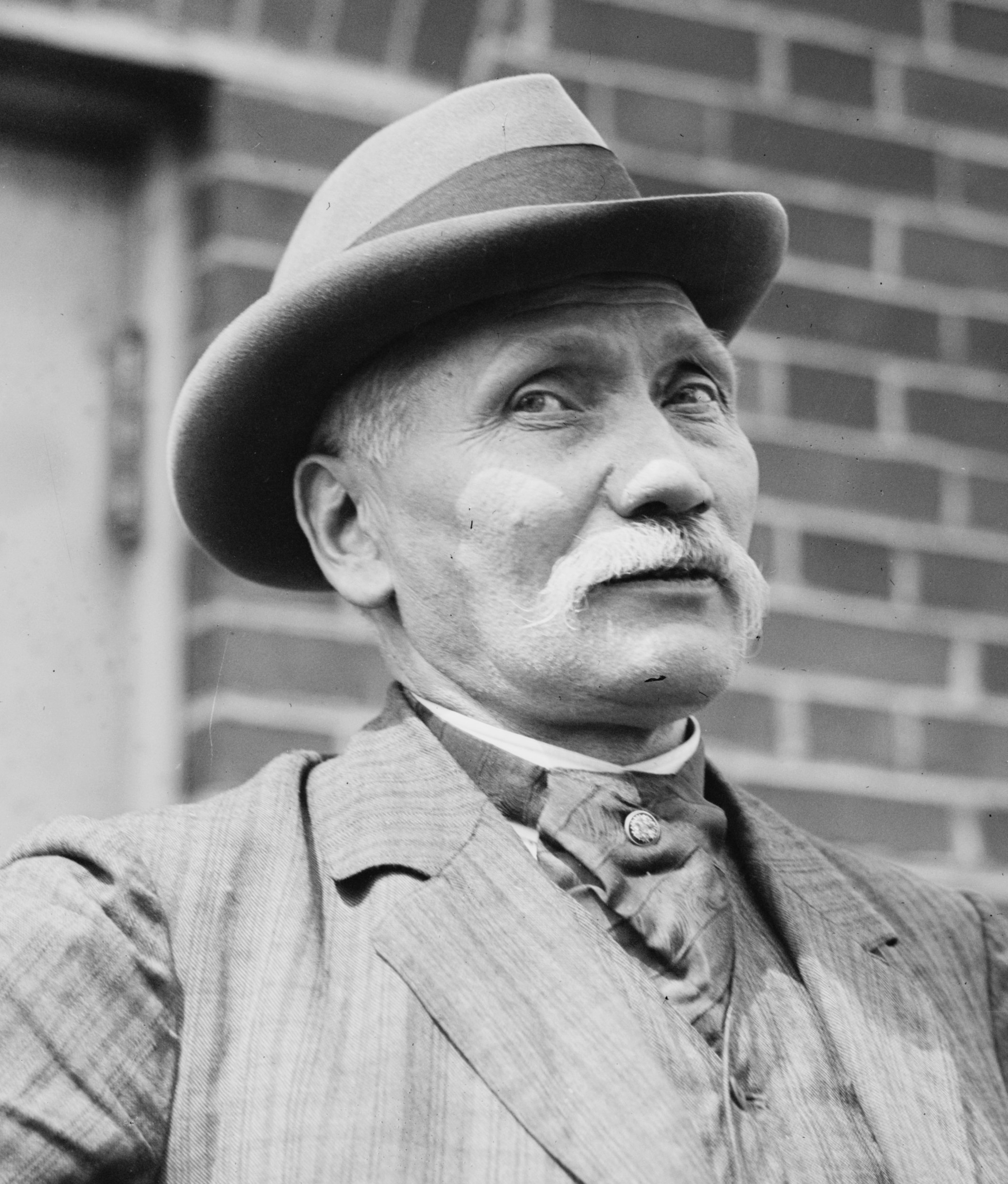
- Voigt in 1910
- Born: 13 February 1849; Tilsit, East Prussia
- Died: 3 January 1922 (aged 72); Luxembourg City, Luxembourg
- Resting place: Notre-Dame Cemetery, Luxembourg City; 49.6154463°N 6.1188853°E
- Occupation: Shoemaker
- Known for: Disguising as a Prussian Captain and robbing 4000 marks (£625)

Friedrich Wilhelm Voigt (German pronunciation: [ˈfʁiːdʁɪç ˈvɪlhɛlm ˈfoːkt]; 13 February 1849 – 3 January 1922) was a German con man and impostor. In his most famous exploit, Voigt masqueraded as a military officer of the elite Prussian Guards in 1906, rounding up several Imperial German Army soldiers under his command, arresting the Mayor of Köpenick, and confiscating 4,002 marks from the city treasury. Voigt then changed back into civilian clothing and disappeared with the money. The case was exploited for British propaganda about German militarism, but the German people overwhelmingly considered Voigt's exploit to be both clever and hilarious. Although Voigt was soon caught and served 20 months in prison, he became a folk hero as "the Captain of Köpenick" (German: der Hauptmann von Köpenick [ˈhaʊptman fɔn ˈkøːpənɪk]) and was granted a full pardon by Kaiser Wilhelm II.

== Early life ==
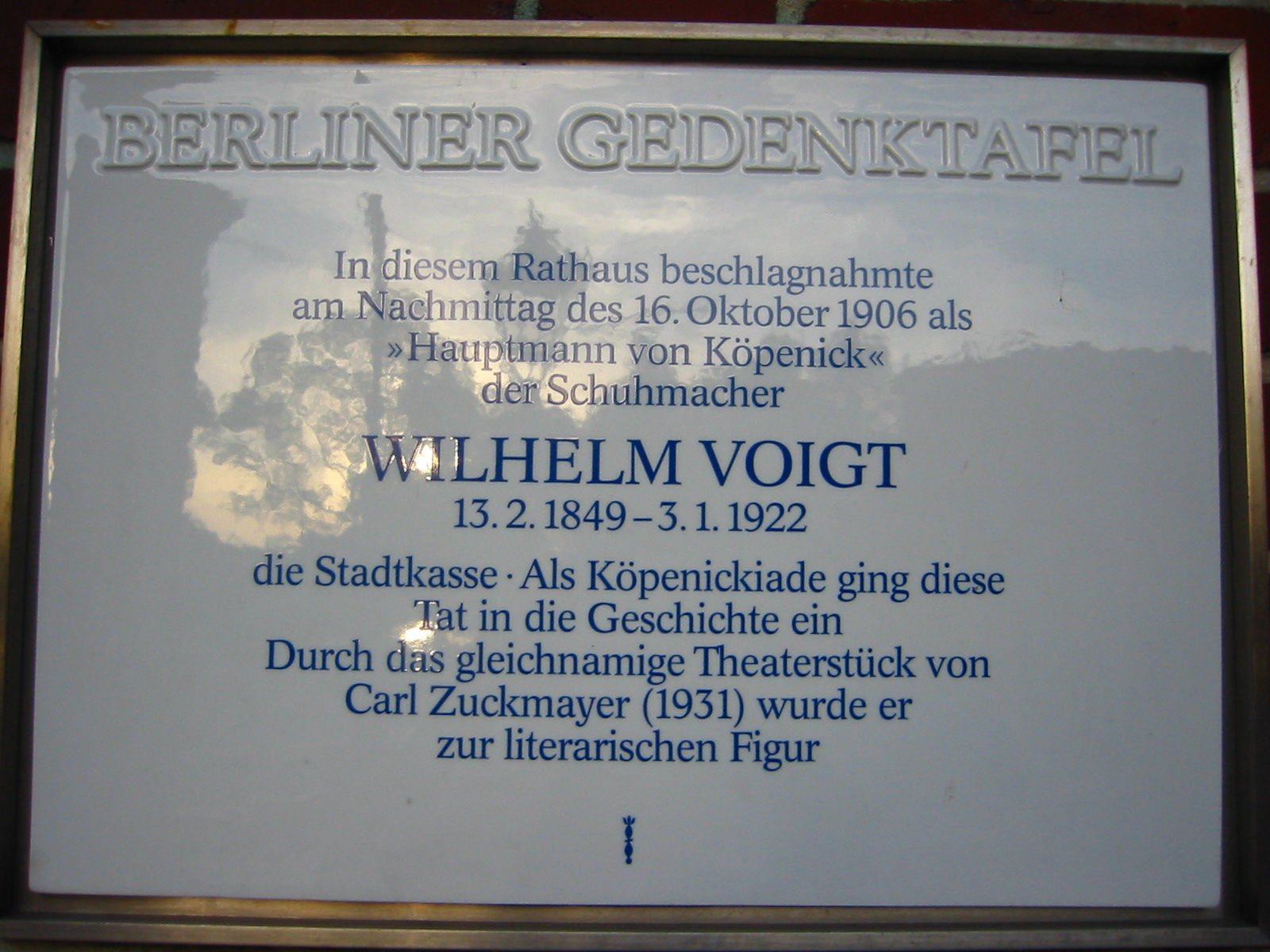
A commemorative memorial plate for Wilhelm Voigt and the Captain of Köpenick at Köpenick city hall. The text briefly recounts the happenings, including the exact date, and the subsequent fame of the case through Carl Zuckmayer's play.

Voigt was born in Tilsit, Prussia (now Sovetsk, Kaliningrad Oblast). In 1863, aged 14, he was sentenced to 14 days in prison for theft, which led to his expulsion from school. He learned shoemaking from his father.

Between 1864 and 1891, Voigt was sentenced to prison for a total of 25 years for thefts, forgery, and burglary. The longest sentence was a 15-year conviction for an unsuccessful burglary of a court cashier's office. He was released on 12 February 1906.

Voigt drifted from place to place until he went to live with his sister in Rixdorf near Berlin. He was briefly employed by a well-reputed shoemaker until the local police expelled him from Berlin as an undesirable, based solely on his being an ex-convict, on 24 August 1906. Officially, he left for Hamburg, although he remained in Berlin as an unregistered resident.

== Captain of Köpenick ==
On 16 October 1906, Voigt was ready for his next caper. He had purchased parts of used Prussian Guards captain's uniforms from different shops and tested their effect on soldiers. He had resigned from the shoe factory ten days previously. He took the uniform out of baggage storage, put it on and went to the local army barracks, stopped four grenadiers and a sergeant on their way back to barracks and told them to come with him and they followed. He dismissed the commanding sergeant to report to his superiors and later commandeered six more soldiers from a shooting range. Then he took a train to Köpenick, east of Berlin, occupied the local city hall with his soldiers and told them to cover all exits. He told the local police to "care for law and order" and to "prevent calls to Berlin for one hour" at the local post office.

He had the treasurer von Wiltberg and mayor Georg Langerhans arrested for political corruption, and confiscated 4002 marks and 37 pfennigs, issuing a receipt for the money signed with his former prison warden's name. Then he commandeered two carriages and told the grenadiers to take the arrested men to the Neue Wache in Berlin for interrogation. He told the remaining soldiers to stand in their places for half an hour and then left for the train station, where he changed back into civilian clothes and disappeared with the money.

== Unraveling and capture ==
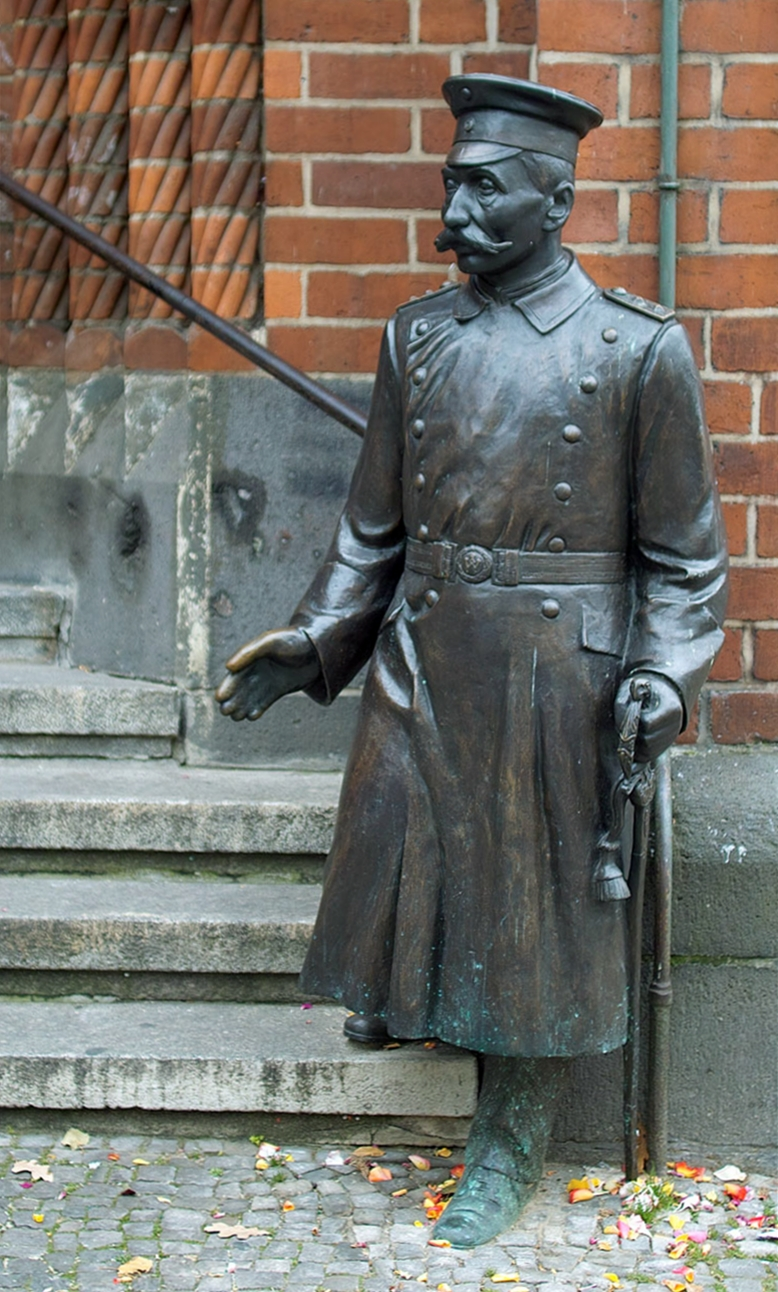
A statue of Wilhelm Voigt as the Captain of Köpenick at Köpenick city hall (by Spartak Babajan)

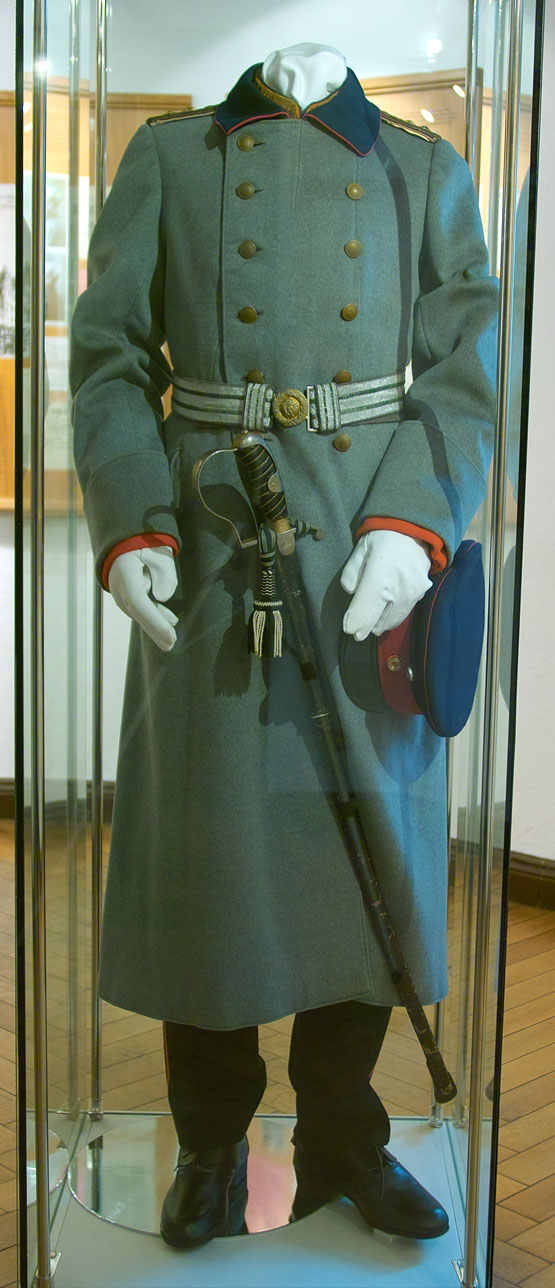
Uniform worn by Wilhelm Voigt as the Captain of Köpenick

In the following days, the German press speculated on what had really happened. At the same time the Imperial German Army ran its own investigation. The German people admired both the cleverness and daring of the culprit.

Voigt was arrested on 26 October 1906 after a former cellmate who knew about Voigt's plans had tipped off the police, hoping for a high reward. On 1 December Voigt was sentenced to four years in prison for forgery, impersonating an officer, and false imprisonment. However, much of public opinion was on his side. German Kaiser Wilhelm II pardoned him on 16 August 1908. There are claims that even the Kaiser was amused by the incident, referring to him as an amiable scoundrel, and being pleased with the authority and feelings of reverence that his military obviously commanded in the general population.

The British press was also amused, seeing it as confirmation of their stereotypes about German militarism. In its 27 October 1906 issue, the editors of The Illustrated London News noted gleefully:

For years the Kaiser has been instilling into his people reverence for the omnipotence of militarism, of which the holiest symbol is the German uniform. Offences against this fetish have incurred condign punishment. Officers who have not considered themselves saluted in due form have drawn their swords with impunity on offending privates.

In that same issue, writer G. K. Chesterton pointed out:

The most absurd part of this absurd fraud (at least, to English eyes) is one which, oddly enough, has received comparatively little comment. I mean the point at which the Mayor asked for a warrant, and the Captain pointed to the bayonets of his soldiery and said, 'These are my authority'. One would have thought anyone would have known that no soldier would talk like that.

== Aftermath ==
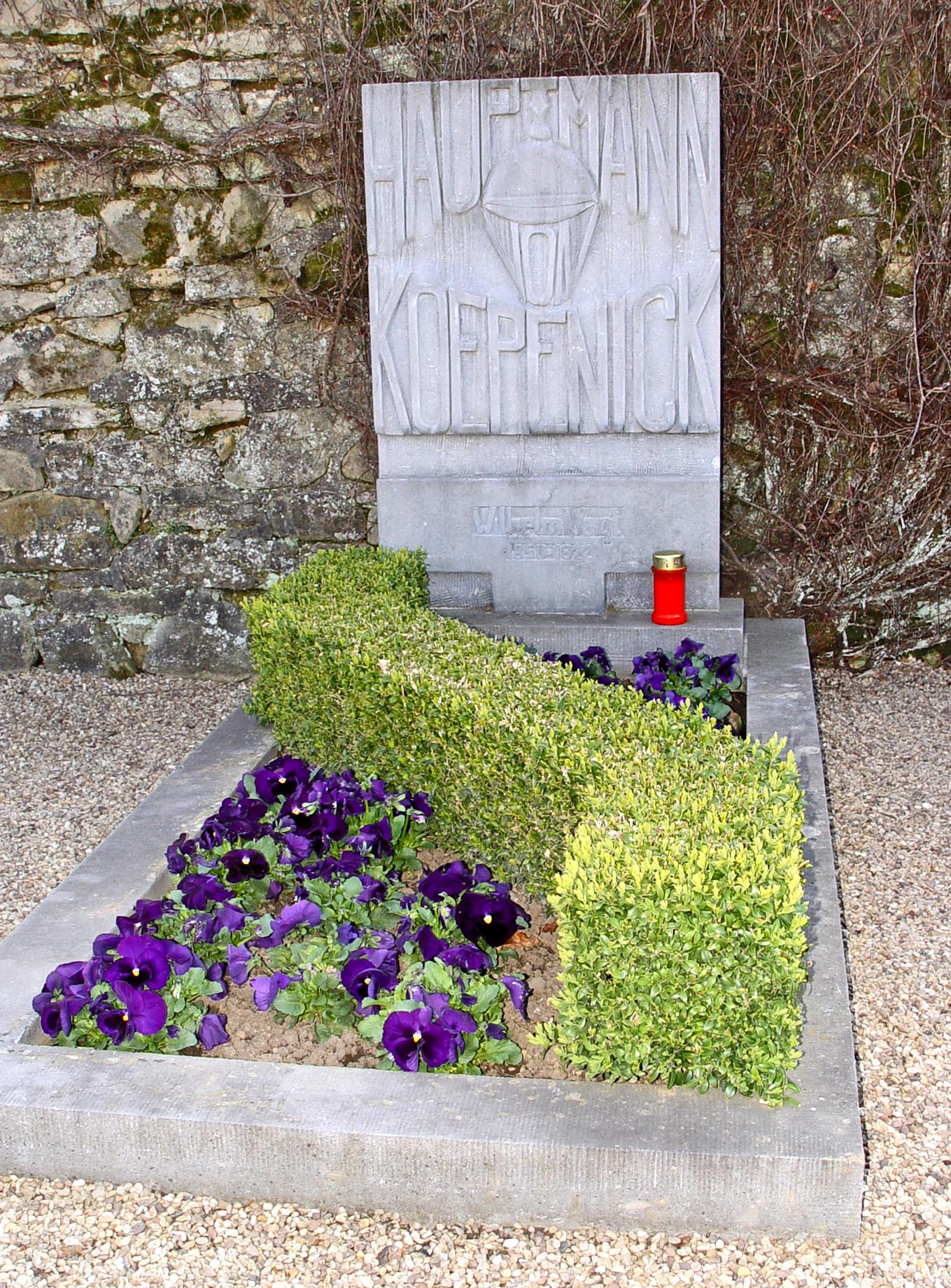
Voigt's gravestone at Notre-Dame Cemetery, Luxembourg City

Voigt capitalised on his fame. His wax figure appeared in the wax museum in Unter den Linden four days after his release. He appeared in the museum to sign his pictures, but public officials banned the appearances on the same day.

He appeared in small theatres in a play that depicted his exploit and signed more photographs as the Captain of Köpenick. In spite of the ban he toured in Dresden, Vienna and Budapest in variety shows, restaurants and amusement parks. In 1909, he published a book in Leipzig, How I became the Captain of Köpenick, which sold well.

Although his United States tour almost failed because the immigration authorities refused to grant him a visa, he arrived in 1910 via Canada. He also inspired a waxwork in the Madame Tussauds museum in London.

In 1910, he moved to Luxembourg and worked as a waiter and shoemaker. He received a life pension from a rich Berlin dowager. Two years later, he bought a house and retired, but was ruined financially in the post–World War I recession. Voigt died of flu in Luxembourg City on 3 January 1922, and was buried at Notre-Dame Cemetery.

== In popular culture ==
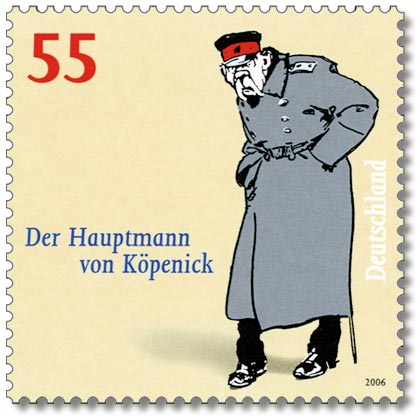
German postage stamp, 2006

Voigt's exploits became the subject of literary references as early as 1911, when British satirical writer Saki defined the term "to koepenick" as "to replace an authority by a spurious imitation that would carry just as much weight for the moment as the displaced original" in his short story "Ministers of Grace".

A silent film was made in German in 1926. In 1931, German author Carl Zuckmayer wrote a play about the affair called The Captain of Köpenick, which shifts the focus from the event at Köpenick itself to the prelude, showing how his surroundings and his situation in life had helped Voigt form his plan. An English-language adaptation was written by John Mortimer, and first performed by the National Theatre company at the Old Vic on 9 March 1971 with Paul Scofield in the title role.

Several more films were produced about Wilhelm Voigt, most based on Zuckmayer's play; among them Der Hauptmann von Köpenick (1931); The Captain from Köpenick (1945), starring Albert Bassermann; Der Hauptmann von Köpenick (1956), with Heinz Rühmann; a 1956 U.S. TV adaptation starring Emmett Kelly, the circus clown; the 1960 TV movie Der Hauptmann von Köpenick, featuring Rudolf Platte; and the 1997 TV movie Der Hauptmann von Köpenick, starring Harald Juhnke.

The basic line of stageplays and movies was the pitiful catch-22 situation of Voigt trying to earn his living honourably in Berlin: "No residence address – no job. No job – no residence (rented room). No residence – no passport. No passport – getting ousted."

In 1943 the Luftwaffe mistakenly thought that an Allied bombing attack which had been carried out on Düren, with the bombers then returning, was a diversion, and the bombers were actually heading for the ball-bearing factory at Schweinfurt. When Schweinfurt was not attacked, they were concerned about the Leuna synthetic fuel refinery, then the Škoda Works in Plzeň. They scrambled large numbers of fighters everywhere, whose engine noise sounded like an invading force. After the debacle, Luftwaffe chief Hermann Göring sent an ironic telegram to all concerned congratulating them on "the successful defence of the fortress of Koepenick".

== See also ==
- Otto Witte, a German impostor who claimed to have been crowned King of Albania
- Joshua Abraham Norton, an American who donned military garb as "Emperor of the United States"
