= The Captain from Köpenick (1931 film) =

1931 film directed by Richard Oswald

- Directed by: Richard Oswald
- Written by: Albrecht Joseph; Carl Zuckmayer (also play)
- Produced by: Gabriel Pascal
- Starring: Max Adalbert; Paul Wagner; Paul Otto
- Cinematography: Ewald Daub
- Edited by: Max Brenner
- Production company: Roto Film
- Distributed by: Süd-Film
- Release date: 22 December 1931
- Running time: 107 minutes
- Country: Germany
- Language: German

The Captain from Köpenick (German: Der Hauptmann von Köpenick) is a 1931 German comedy film directed by Richard Oswald and produced by Gabriel Pascal. It is one of several films based on the 1931 play of the same name by Carl Zuckmayer. The story centers on the Hauptmann von Köpenick affair in 1906.

It was shot at the Johannisthal Studios in Berlin and on location in Köpenick. The film's sets were designed by the art director Franz Schroedter.

== Plot ==
Der Hauptmann von Köpenick is based on a true story that took place in Germany in 1906. A poor cobbler named Wilhelm Voigt purchased the second-hand uniform of a Prussian infantry captain. Wearing this, he travelled to the borough of Köpenick and ordered a troop of guardsmen to place themselves under his command. He then declared the town hall to be under military law, ordering the arrest of the mayor and treasurer and confiscating all the funds in the exchequer. In this film version it's a considerable sum of 4,000 reichsmarks. Voigt's orders were obeyed without question and he temporarily got away with the caper, although he was eventually caught.

== Cast ==
- Max Adalbert as Wilhelm Voigt
- Ernst Dernburg as discharge administrator
- Willi Schur as Kalle
- Paul Wagner as Captain von Schlettow
- Hermann Vallentin as taylor Adolph Wormser
- Emil Wabschke as Wabschke
- Peter Wolff as Willy, son of Wormser
- Fritz Beckmann as master shoemaker
- Arthur Mainzer as authorized signatory Knell
- Heinrich Marlow as district inspector
- Heinz Sarnow as Dr. Jellinek
- Edith Karin as Plörösenmieze
- Gerhard Bienert as grenadier of the guard
- Viktor Franz as elder civilian
- Henry Pleß as constable, Cafe National
- Oskar Höcker as constable, district
- Paul Marx as judge
- Albert Florath as keeper
- Manfred Hille as boy at Captain von Schlettow
- Max Gülstorff as mayor Dr. Obermüller
- Hans Halder as correction house director
- Ilse Fürstenberg as Marie Hoprecht
- Friedrich Kayßler as Friedrich Hoprecht
- Käthe Haack as Mathilde Obermüller
- Martha Ziegler as Fanny, maid at Obermüllers
- Leonard Steckel as Krakauer, broker
- Hans Wassmann as railway official
- Eugen Rex as railway official
- Kurt Lüpke as soldier
- Erich Gomlicski as guardsman
- Ernst Karchow as passenger of the non-smoking section
- Hermann Speelmans as staff sergeant Killian
- Paul Rehkopf as farmer
- Ernst Wurmser as police inspector
- Fritz Odemar as city treasurer Rosenkrantz
- Rudolf Blümner as city treasurer
- Fred Goebel as Leutnant der Neuen Wache
- Paul Otto as colonel
- Hans Leibelt as man of advertising column
- Alfred Beierle as passport commissioner
- Heinrich Schroth as Chief Constable
- Hermann Wlach as discharge administrator

== See also ==
- The Captain from Köpenick (1926 film)
- The Captain from Köpenick (1945 film)
- The Captain from Köpenick (1956 film)
- Der Hauptmann von Köpenick (1997 film)

== Bibliography ==
- Rentschler, Eric, ed. (2013). German Film and Literature: Adaptations and Transformations. Hoboken: Taylor & Francis. ISBN 978-1-136-36873-8.
