= The Captain of Köpenick (play) =

1931 satirical play by Carl Zuckmayer

- Original language: German
- Written by: Carl Zuckmayer
- Setting: Potsdam, Berlin and Köpenick

Premiere
- Date: 1931

The Captain of Köpenick (German: Der Hauptmann von Köpenick) is a satirical play by the German dramatist Carl Zuckmayer. First produced in 1931, the play tells the story, based on a true event that happened in 1906, of a down-on-his-luck ex-convict shoemaker (Wilhelm Voigt) who impersonates a Prussian Guards officer, holds the mayor of a small town to ransom, and successfully "confiscates" the town's treasury, claiming to be acting in the name of the Kaiser. The Prussian cult of the uniform ensures that the townspeople are all too willing to obey his orders, in stark contrast to the treatment the protagonist was given before he donned the uniform. Zuckmayer described the story as a "German fairy tale".

== Plot ==
The first part of the play deals with the two parallel (and at some points intertwined) stories of Wilhelm Voigt himself and the uniform which plays a central role in the story, which is set in Potsdam, Berlin and Köpenick around 1900. The uniform is originally made by the Jewish tailor Wormser for the Gardehauptmann (lit. "Captain of the Guard", but better translated as "Captain in the Guard Regiment") von Schlettow. But after a scandal in which von Schlettow is arrested by the police in civilian attire as he attempts to peacefully settle a bar brawl, initiated by a drunk grenadier, von Schlettow is forced to retire, and the uniform is returned to Wormser. Eventually, the uniform is refitted for Dr. Obermüller, the mayor of Köpenick, for his promotion to Captain, but during a party afterwards the uniform is indelibly stained in an accidental spilling and ends up in a rag shop.

Wilhelm Voigt, a trained shoemaker who has spent most of his life in prison for thefts and forgeries, is released after yet another stint and tries to make an honest living in his advanced age. However, this is doomed to failure from the outset as the militarized, inflexible society of the late German Empire offers practically nothing to citizens who have not served in the military (a fact which applies to Voigt). This catches him in a vicious circle: without legal registration (just a simple passport would suffice) he can't get any work, and without any work he can't get a legal registration. In the end, a desperate Voigt resorts to breaking into a post office in order to get the passport, while his friend Kalle goes after the money, but both are caught in the process and Voigt once more goes to jail. During his ten-year stint in Sonneberg Prison, however, he gets formal military training, as the warden is a military enthusiast who enlists his convicts into re-enacting famous battles dating back to the Franco-Prussian War.

After his discharge from prison, Voigt moves in with his sister Marie and her husband Friedrich Hoprecht, and takes care of their lodger, a sick young girl named Liese. One evening, while reading a fairy tale to the girl, Voigt receives the official denial of his permit of residence application; this and Liese's death finally move him into resisting the cruel system he is caught up in. He procures the uniform, whose authority by appearance and his trained military bearing enable him to recruit a group of grenadiers right off the street without any questions asked. Voigt and his team proceed to the Köpenick city hall where he has Obermüller and the whole city council arrested but fails to procure a passport as he had intended (because the passport office is located elsewhere).

The publicity which ensues from this feat label the Hauptmann von Köpenick, as he is nicknamed, a folk hero and prankster, but Voigt himself does not draw any joy from this. Eventually, he surrenders to the authorities in exchange for the promise of a legal registration, providing the uniform to prove his identity as the Hauptmann. The police officers take his confession and surrender with surprisingly good humor, and in the end Voigt asks to see himself in a mirror dressed in the uniform, as he had not had the opportunity to do so yet. The policemen comply, and as he sees himself in the mirror, Voigt begins to laugh in amusement at his own reflection, guffawing the last line in the play: "Impossible!"

== Performances and adaptations ==
The play was first produced in London in 1953 and subsequently at the Old Vic by the National Theatre Company in 1971, starring Paul Scofield as Wilhelm Voigt. In 2013 the National Theatre again produced a version of the play in English, this time in a translation and adaptation by Ron Hutchinson. Antony Sher took the title role to much critical acclaim although generally the production was not well reviewed.

The play has been adapted for film and television many times:

- The Captain from Köpenick (1926), a German film directed by Siegfried Dessauer and starring Hermann Picha
- The Captain from Köpenick (1931), a German film directed by Richard Oswald, starring Max Adalbert and Paul Wagner
- The Captain from Köpenick (completed in 1941, released in 1945) (also released as I Was a Criminal), an American film again directed by Oswald, starring Albert Bassermann
- The Captain from Köpenick (1956), a West German film directed by Helmut Käutner starring Heinz Rühmann
- The Captain from Köpenick (1958), an episode of the BBC series Television World Theatre directed by Rudolf Cartier, and starring Albert Lieven
- The Captain from Köpenick (1960), a German TV movie directed by Rainer Wolffhardt and starring Rudolf Platte
- The Captain of Kopenick, a 1974 Canadian television adaptation aired as an episode of the anthology series Performance with Donald Pleasence in the lead role
- Der Hauptmann von Köpenick (1997), a German TV movie directed by Frank Beyer and starring Harald Juhnke
- Der Hauptmann von Köpenick (2005), a German TV movie directed by Matthias Hartmann and starring Otto Sander
- The Captain of Nakara (2012), a Kenyan comedy film which sets the story in an African country

== Influences ==
The plot heavily emphasizes (and satirically criticizes) the proverb "Kleider machen Leute" (English: "Clothes Make the Man") in the context of the German Empire's militarized society, in which the high military gets all the social privileges while the little man is left with nothing.

In exploring the case of a town duped by a character impersonating an authoritative figure, the play bears some resemblance to Nikolai Gogol's Russian classic, The Government Inspector (1836). Friedrich Dürrenmatt used a similar dramaturgical structure—a visitor to a provincial town—to satirical (although much darker) ends in The Visit (1956).
