= The Captain from Köpenick (1926 film) =

1926 film

- Directed by: Siegfried Dessauer
- Written by: Siegfried Dessauer
- Starring: Hermann Picha; Fritz Kampers; Gerhard Ritterband
- Cinematography: Reimar Kuntze
- Music by: Felix Bartsch
- Production company: Alhambra-Film
- Release date: June 1926
- Country: Germany
- Languages: Silent; German intertitles

The Captain from Köpenick (German: Der Hauptmann von Köpenick) is a 1926 German silent film directed by Siegfried Dessauer and starring Hermann Picha, Fritz Kampers, and Gerhard Ritterband. It is based on the case of Wilhelm Voigt.

The film's sets were designed by the art director Fritz Kraenke.

== Cast ==
- Hermann Picha
- Fritz Kampers
- Gerhard Ritterband
- Rosa Valetti
- Hanni Reinwald
- Valeska Stock
- Clementine Plessner
- Henry Bender
- Alice Torning
- Karl Harbacher
- Hugo Fischer-Köppe
- Ellen Plessow

== See also ==
- The Captain from Köpenick (1931 film)
- The Captain from Köpenick (1945 film)
- The Captain from Köpenick (1956 film)
- Der Hauptmann von Köpenick (1997 film)

== Bibliography ==
- Kapczynski, Jennifer M.; Richardson, Michael D., eds. (2014) [2012]. A New History of German Cinema. New York: Boydell & Brewer. ISBN 978-1-58046-854-1.
