= Der Hauptmann von Köpenick (1997 film) =

1997 film

- Based on: The Captain of Köpenick by Carl Zuckmayer
- Written by: Wolfgang Kohlhaase
- Directed by: Frank Beyer
- Starring: Harald Juhnke
- Music by: Peter Gotthardt
- Country of origin: Germany
- Original language: German

Production
- Producers: Doris J. Heinze; Klaus-Dieter Zeisberg
- Cinematography: Eberhard Geick
- Editor: Clarissa Ambach
- Running time: 100 minutes
- Production company: Hanover Film

Original release
- Release: 21 August 1997

Der Hauptmann von Köpenick (English: The Captain of Köpenick) is a 1997 Germany historical drama film directed by Frank Beyer, written by Wolfgang Kohlhaase, and starring Harald Juhnke. It was developed from a 1931 play of the same name based on the true story of German con man Wilhelm Voigt, and his actions as he disguised himself as a Prussian Captain.

== Cast ==
- Harald Juhnke: Wilhelm Voigt
- Udo Samel: Bürgermeister Obermüller
- Elisabeth Trissenaar: Mathilde Obermüller
- Katharina Thalbach: Marie Hoprecht
- Rolf Hoppe: Zuchthausdirektor
- Hark Bohm: Kriminalinspektor Schmude
- Jürgen Hentsch: Kriminaldirektor Mehlhorn
- Sophie Rois: Mieze
- Gerry Wolff: Krakauer
- Florian Lukas: Willy Wormser
- Alexander Beyer: Melder
