= ALZ (steelworks) =

Coordinates: 50.934592°N 5.510631°E

- Industry: Steel
- Founded: 1960
- Successor: Ugine & ALZ (U&A); ArcelorMittal Stainless
- Headquarters: Genk, Belgium
- Products: Stainless steel plate and coil

ALZ (Allegheny-Longdoz) is a stainless steel producer based in Genk in Limburg province, Flanders, Belgium.

In 2001 the company was merged with French stainless steel producer Ugine and in 2006 became part of the ArcelorMittal group as part of the stainless steel division.

== History ==
ALZ was founded as a vertically integrated stainless steel producer in 1960 as an equal holding between Espérance-Longdoz (Belgium) (controlled by Evence Coppée) and Allegheny Ludlum (USA).

In 1970 Espérance-Longdoz (Société Métallurgique d'Espérance Longdoz) became part of Cockerill-Ougrée-Providence, and ALZ became a Cockerill subsidiary; Allegheny Ludlum disposed of its shares, and in 1971 Cockerill had a 90% stake of the shares. In 1979/80 the Cockerill group was restructure due to financial problems, and also disposed of its shares; German steel company Klöckner became a shareholder, in 1981 the other Flanders-based steelmaker Sidmar became a shareholder, by 1987 the majority shareholder. In 1988 the company became part of the Arbed group. In 2001 Arbed became part of Arcelor and ALZ merged with French stainless producer Société d’électrochimie, d'électrométallurgie et des aciéries électriques d'Ugine (in French), former producer of the Zyklon B in France during World War II, to become Ugine & ALZ (U&A).

Subsequently, in 2006, Arcelor merged with Mittal Steel Company to form ArcelorMittal, and the works is now part of ArcelorMittal's stainless steel division.

=== Production ===
Initially the company processed steel by cold rolling, annealing and other processes, using stainless steel imported from the USA. Later the plant expanded to include casting, and an electric foundry installed in 1970. Cast stainless blocks were produced at the factory and sent to the Espérance-Longdoz plant in Chertal, Liege for conversion to slab, they then returned to ALZ for rolling.

Continuous cast stainless steel production was introduced in the mid-1970s, eliminated the need to have slabbing done at Chertal. Widths of up to 2050 mm could be continuous cast. In 1987, an electric foundry was installed with ultra-high power electric arc furnace, converter and vacuum oxygen decarburisation increasing capacity by more than double.

As of 2002 steel production was ~1million tonne pa producing stainless steel coil and plate mainly from scrap. The factory site of 78.5 ha (0.785 km^{2}) is connected to the rail network, and is situated on the north bank of the Albert Canal from which it draws cooling water.
