= EKO Stahl =

Steelworks

Coordinates: 52.163948°N 14.639340°E

ArcelorMittal Eisenhüttenstadt
- Formerly: Eisenhüttenkombinat J.W. Stalin (1950); Eisenhüttenkombinat Ost (EKO) (1961); EKO Stahl GmbH, (1990)
- Industry: Steel
- Website: www.arcelormittal-ehst.com

EKO Stahl is a steelworks in Eisenhüttenstadt, Brandenburg, Germany. It was established by the East German government in the early 1950s on a greenfield site, initially producing only pig iron. The name was changed in 1961 from Eisenhuttenkombinat 'J.W. Stalin' to Eisenhüttenkombinat Ost (EKO).

Cold rolling facilities were added in 1974, and basic oxygen steelmaking in 1984. After German reunification in 1990 the state-owned plant was privatised, and Belgian firm Cockerill-Sambre acquired it in stages from 1994 to 1998. Hot rolling facilities were added in the 1990s. Through mergers and takeovers, the owning comping since 2006 has been ArcelorMittal, and as of 2016 the plant is known as ArcelorMittal Eisenhüttenstadt.

== History ==
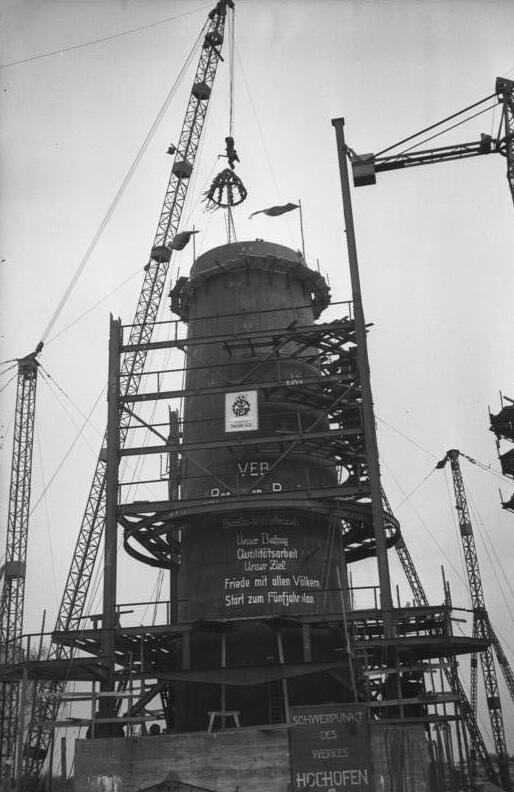
Blast furnace under construction, 1951

In 1950 at the third party conference of the Socialist Unity Party of Germany the construction of a new steelworks was announced. A flat, agriculturally unimportant site near Fürstenberg was chosen, and on 18 August 1950 minister Fritz Selbmann symbolically felled a mountain pine tree, indicating the start of the work on construction of the new plant, named Eisenhuttenkombinat 'J.W. Stalin'. Part of the rationale for the plant was to compensate for an embargo on steel from western Germany, where most of primary production had historically been located – raw materials (iron ore and coal) were to be supplied from Ukraine and Upper Silesia respectively. An additional rational was to provide work for a large number of German refugees (see also Flight and expulsion of Germans from Poland during and after World War II).

In 1953 the number of planned blast furnaces was scaled back from eight to six, and overall plans for the site were reduced to include only production of pig iron. As part of a continued political process of De-Stalinization the plant was renamed Eisenhüttenkombinat Ost (EKO), at the same time the nearby town of Stalinstadt was renamed Eisenhüttenstadt.

In 1968 a cold rolling mill became operational after three years of construction; plans for addition of steel production and hot rolling were initiated in the same period, but cancelled in 1967. In 1969 the works was combined with several other steel producing works including those in VVB Stahl- und Walzwerke Berlin and VVB Eisenerz/Roheisen Saalfeld into Bandstahlkombinat Eisenhüttenstadt (BKE).

In 1974 the cold rolling plant was improved to include the production of galvanised and other coated steels. In 1984 a turnkey oxygen conversion (Linz-Donawitz process) based steelworks was installed by Austrian supplier Voest-Alpine.

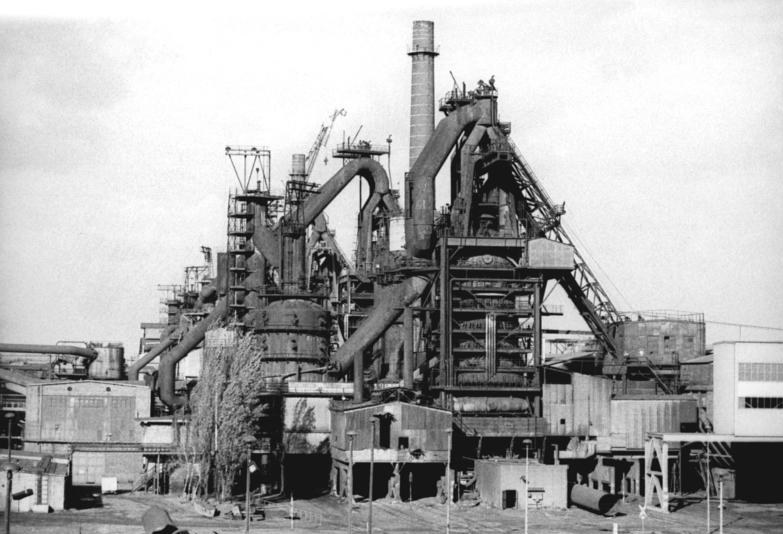
Blast furnaces in 1990

At German reunification in 1990 EKO became a corporation (EKO Stahl GmbH) – subsequent loss of business in East Germany and eastern Europe caused serious economic problems for the company, as did the high employment rates, and relatively low-value product range. During the transition to a free market model employment was reduced from over 12,000 to under 3,000. In 1994–95 Cockerill-Sambre acquired a 60% stake in the company, with the state (via the treuhandanstalt) retaining 40%. As part of the acquisition improvements to the plant were scheduled for completion 1998 including a new blast furnace, a hot rolling mill, and an upgrade to the cold rolling mill. 900 million Deutschmarks in state aid for the reconstruction was approved by the European Union. By 1997 the modernisation work and construction of blast furnace and hot rolling plant had been completed. In 1998 Cockerill-Sambre acquired the remaining 40% of the company for 40 million Deutschmarks. Cockerill-Sambre became part of Usinor in 1998.

A second galvanizing line was added in 1999, serving the automotive industry. The company became part of Arcelor in 2001 through the merger of Usinor, Aceralia and Arbed. In 2006 the works became part of ArcelorMittal though the takeover of the parent company.

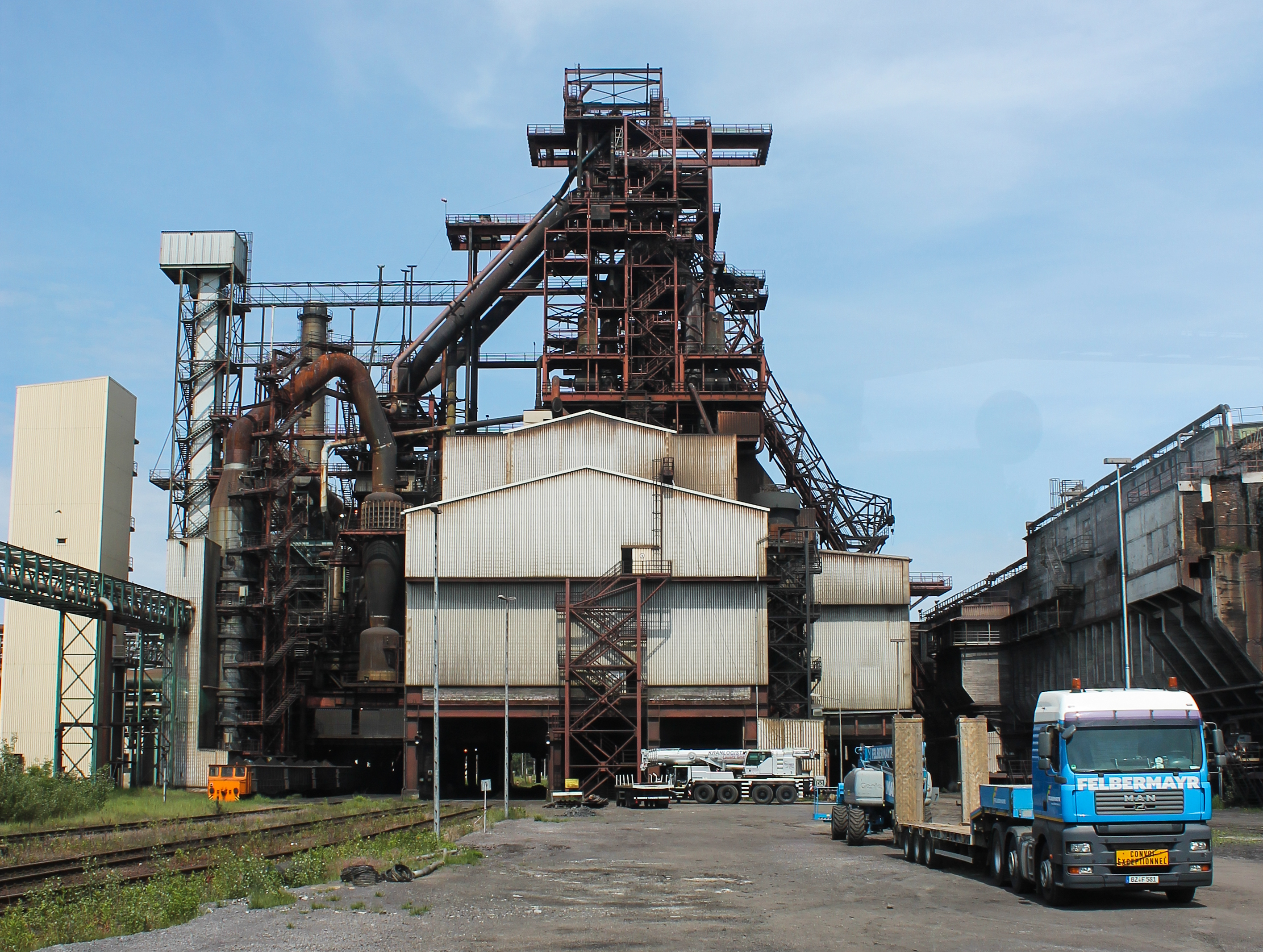
Blast furnaces in 2013

A third galvanising line was approved in 2007, and construction started in 2008, due to the global recession (see Great Recession) work on the line was halted in 2009, and a blast furnace idled. Economic uncertainty continued to the early 2010s. Lake Pohlitz supplies 8 million cubic meters of water to the process, and the waste water is treated before release to the Oder river.
