= Espérance-Longdoz =

Former coal mining company in Belgium

Société des Charbonnages, Hauts Fourneaux et Laminoirs de l'Espérance (1863-1877) Société métallurgique d'Espérance-Longdoz (1877-1970)
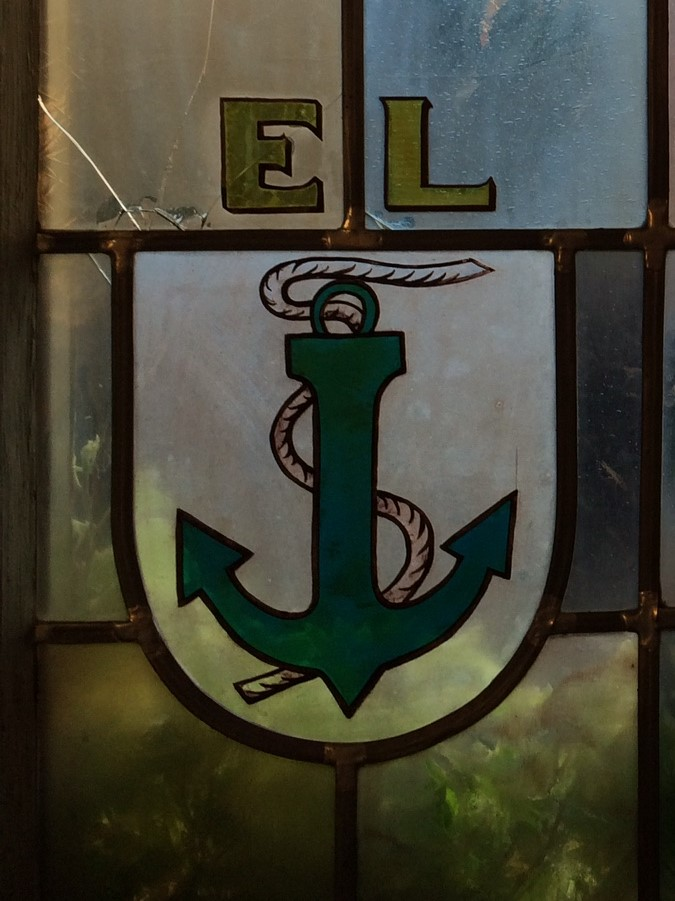
- Industry: Steel
- Predecessor: Société anonyme des Hauts Fourneaux, Usines et Charbonnages de l'Espérance and Société Dothée et Cie. (Longdoz)
- Successor: Cockerill-Ougrée-Providence-Espérance Longdoz (1970)
- Headquarters: Longdoz, Liège, Belgium
- Products: Rolled steel plate

Espérance-Longdoz was a coal mining and steel production company located in the Liège region of Belgium.

The company merged with Cockerill-Ougrée-Providence in 1970 to form Cockerill-Ougrée-Providence-Espérance Longdoz (known as Cockerill), later being merged into Usinor, then Arcelor then ArcelorMittal.

Production at Longdoz ceased in the latter part of the 20th century, the factory site was redeveloped in the 2000s into a shopping complex Médiacité, one part of the buildings at Longdoz has been preserved and is now the home of an industrial museum La Maison de la Métallurgie et de l'Industrie de Liège.

A later steelworks development, built at Chertal in the 1960s is still in operation (as of 2010) and is part of the ArcelorMittal group, within the Liège division.

== History ==
In 1845/6 the Dothée brothers established a tinplate factory in Longdoz in Liège Province, then in 1862/3 the Dothée brothers merged their business with the Société anonyme des Hauts Fourneaux, Usines et Charbonnages de l'Espérance (founded 1836) forming the Société des Charbonnages, Hauts Fourneaux et Laminoirs de l'Espérance. In 1877 the company divested from the coalmining side of its business and became the Société métallurgique d'Espérance-Longdoz.

The innovation of hot-dip galvanizing was introduced in 1881 by Paul Borgnet who later founded the Phenix Works in Flémalle in 1911. In 1920 Evence Coppée & Cie. acquired the company. (Note: Evence Coppée & Cie : formed 1914, founded by Evence Coppée I, patentee of a Coke oven in 1853, developed into a vertically integrated coal mining and processing company. Disbanded in 1970, holdings later merged with Lafarge to form Lafarge Coppée. Source "Les archives du Groupe Coppée". www.avae-vvba.be (in French). Association pour la valorisation des archives d'entreprises (AVAE) - Vereniging voor de valorisatie van bedrijfsarchieven (VVBA). Archived from the original on 2011-07-06.)

The company became the largest Belgian producer of sheet metal, reaching a peak production of 142,000 tonnes in 1948. The plant in Longdoz, however was hemmed in by the city, and could not expand. After 1957 the Longdoz plant ceased hot rolling of steel, and was used only for finishing of the plate, and distribution.

In 1960 the company formed, in joint venture with Allegheny Ludlum, a new stainless steel producer: Allegheny-Longdoz (ALZ) in Genk, Flanders.

In 1963 a new plant was built on a greenfield site at a reclaimed floodplain island site at Chertal, with a capacity of 1.6 million tonnes of steel produced by the Linz-Donawitz process. Without primary iron production the plant was supplied from the works 22 km away Seraing by torpedo wagons.

The company was sold by Evence Coppée & Cie. to Cockerill-Ougrée-Providence in 1970, merging to form Cockerill-Ougrée-Providence et Espérance Longdoz (abbr. Cockerill), and later became part of Cockerill-Sambre, Usinor, and ultimately Arcelor and ArcelorMittal though the mergers of its parent companies.

== Fate ==
=== Longdoz ===
In 2006 the land occupied by the disused steelworks at Longdoz was authorised to be used to create a shopping and leisure complex known as Médiacité. The BREEAM accredited complex opened 20 October 2009.

One part of the steelworks remains, the museum La Maison de la Métallurgie et de l'Industrie de Liège; originally opened in 1963 when production was moved to Chertal, in 1971 the collection was expanded by the addition of relics from the Cockerill company. In 1976 the museum was donated to the city of Liège. The museum contains the reconstruction of the earliest Belgian blast furnace, 19th century steam engines and steam driven machinery, as well as other historically important industrial inventions, including the second prototype dynamo of Zénobe Gramme (1871) and a Herman Hollerith Tabulating machine (1889),

=== Chertal ===
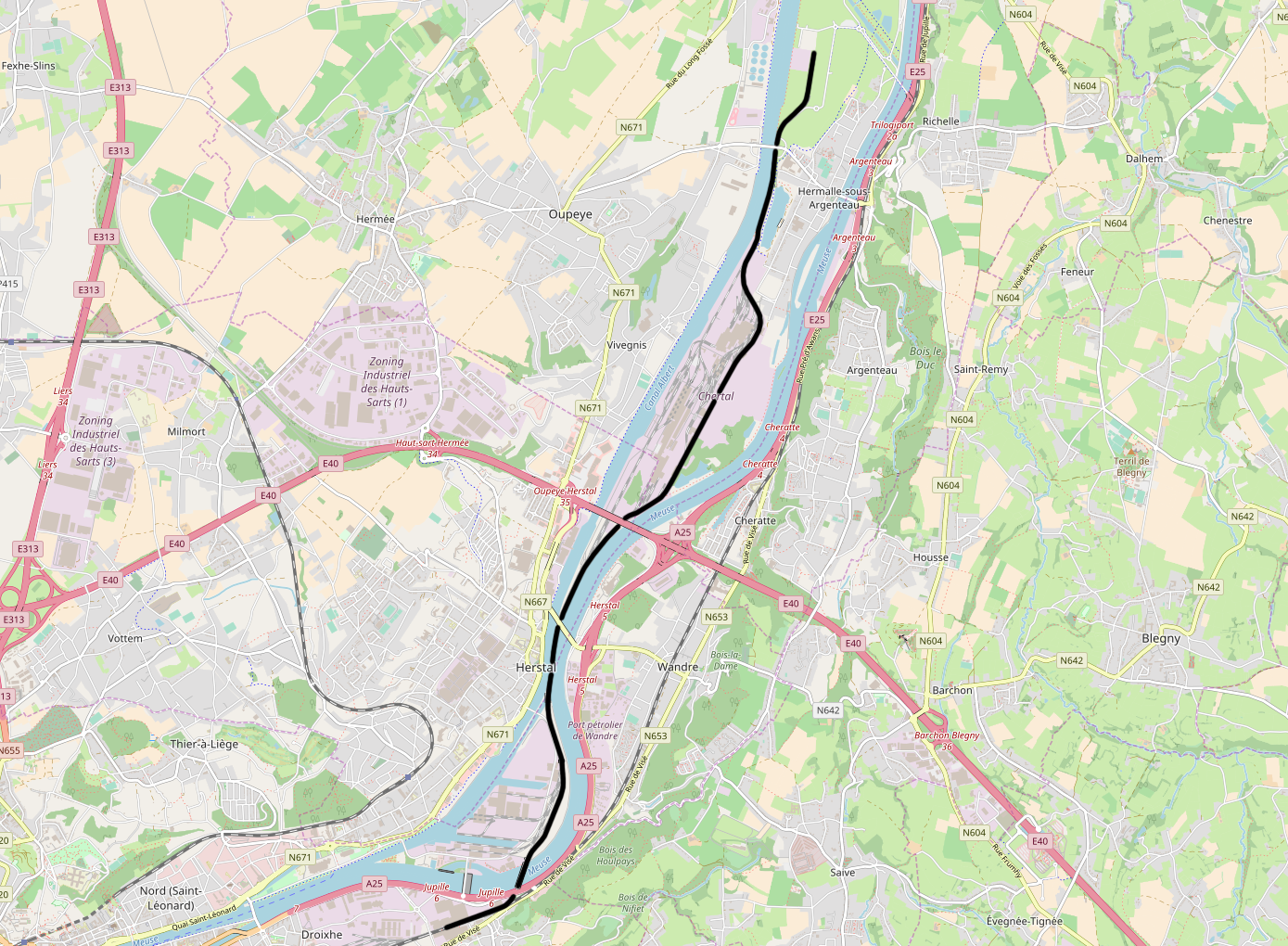
Infrabel railway line 214 for Chertal, branches from line 40 (Liège to Maastricht)

50.690272°N 5.659527°E

Production at the Chertal site continued through Cockerill, Cockerill-Sambre, Arcelor, and ArcelorMittal ownership.

The facilities became part of the ArcelorMittal Liège division. Hot rolling briefly stopped in from May to April 2009 due to the economic downturn caused by the 2008 financial crisis.

The steel plant was supplied by rail using 130t capacity torpedo wagons. The plant had three LD converters, facilities for iron desulphurisation and vacuum treatment. Production is by continuous casting with a capacity of 3.5million tonnes pa, the primary product is hot rolled steel coil up to 2m wide.

In October 2011 ArcelorMittal announced the closure of liquid steel ("hot phase") production at its Liège division, including blast furnaces in Seraing and part of the plant at Chertal.

As of 2012 in Chertal only the Hot Strip Mill is still working. It is supplied with slabs coming from other ArcelorMittal production sites. Its future is uncertain.
