= Phenix Works =

Coordinates: 50.593857°N 5.465788°E

SA Phenix Works
- Industry: Cold rolled steel, steel plating
- Founded: 1905
- Founder: Paul Borgnet
- Fate: acquired by Cockerill-Ougrée-Providence (1969), absorbed by Cockerill-Sambre (1989)
- Parent: ArcelorMittal

The Phenix Works is a steel working factory located in Flémalle-Haute, Liège, Belgium. The business was established in 1905 by Paul Borgnet and became part of SA Phenix Work in 1911. The works specialised in coated steels, such as galvanised, tin plate etc.

Acquired by Cockerill-Ougrée-Providence (1969) and later absorbed by its successor Cockerill-Sambre (1989), as of 2016 the works is part of ArcelorMittal Liège, the Belgian subsidiary of ArcelorMittal.

== History ==
The Phenix Works was founded in 1910/111 through the merger of Paul Borgnet's factory in Flémalle-Haute and the factory "Phenix" in Roux. The works in Flemalle was established c.1905 by Paul Borgnet (1863-1944) on a 16 hectares (40 acres) site in Flemalle-Haute.

The company's specialisation was the manufacture of galvanised corrugated sheets for roofing, and in 1930 employed c.3000 persons. Equipment for galvanizing sheet steel was installed in 1925; for producing tinplate in 1935. The company expanded to Ivoz-Ramet and facilities for cold rolling steel were added (1950); plastic coating "skinplate" (1954) additional galvanization equipment as well as aluminium rolling were added (1961); and painted steel (1966).

In 1969 Phenix works became part of the Cockerill-Ougrée-Providence (COP) group.

In 1981 the company formed Galvalange S.à r.l. in Dudelange, Luxembourg as a joint venture with ARBED. The factory manufactured hot dip galvanised or aluminium/zinc coated (Aluzinc) steel coil. (as of 2016 part of ArcelorMittal Atlantique-Lorraine.)

In 1983 the company, together with Sidmar and Koninklijke Hoogovens formed the joint venture. SEGAL (Société Européenne de Galvanisation) at Ivoz-Ramet, Liège, Belgium which would produce hot dip galvanized steel for the car industry.

In 1989 the company was fully absorbed into Cockerill-Sambre.

In 2004 Corus, Koninklijke Hoogovens successor, became the sole owner of the joint venture SEGAL.

The parent business underwent a series of mergers forming part of Cockerill-Sambre (1980), Usinor (1999), Arcelor (2002) and ArcelorMittal (2008).
