= ArcelorMittal Bremen =

- Formerly: Klöckner Hutte Bremen (Klöckner Werke AG) (1957); Klöckner Stahl GmbH (1986); Stahlwerke Bremen GmbH (1994); Arcelor Bremen GmbH (2006)
- Industry: Steel
- Predecessor: Norddeutsche Hütte (1911)
- Headquarters: 53.124°N 8.689°E
- Website: bremen.arcelormittal.com

ArcelorMittal Bremen is a steelworks on the banks of the River Weser in Bremen, Germany.

An ironworks was established on the site in 1911 as Norddeutsche Hütte - much of the works was destroyed or dismantled during and immediately after the end of the Second World War. In 1957 steel group Klöckner established a new steel works on the same site, Klöckner Hütte Bremen. After growth during the 1960s and 1970s the business began to experience financial problems, and in the early 1990s Klöckner became effectively bankrupt. In 1994 the steelworks at Bremen was acquired by Sidmar, renamed Stahlwerke Bremen; it later became part of Usinor, Arcelor (2002), and ArcelorMittal (2006) through mergers of the parent holding company.

== History ==
=== Norddeutsche Hütte (1911-1945) ===
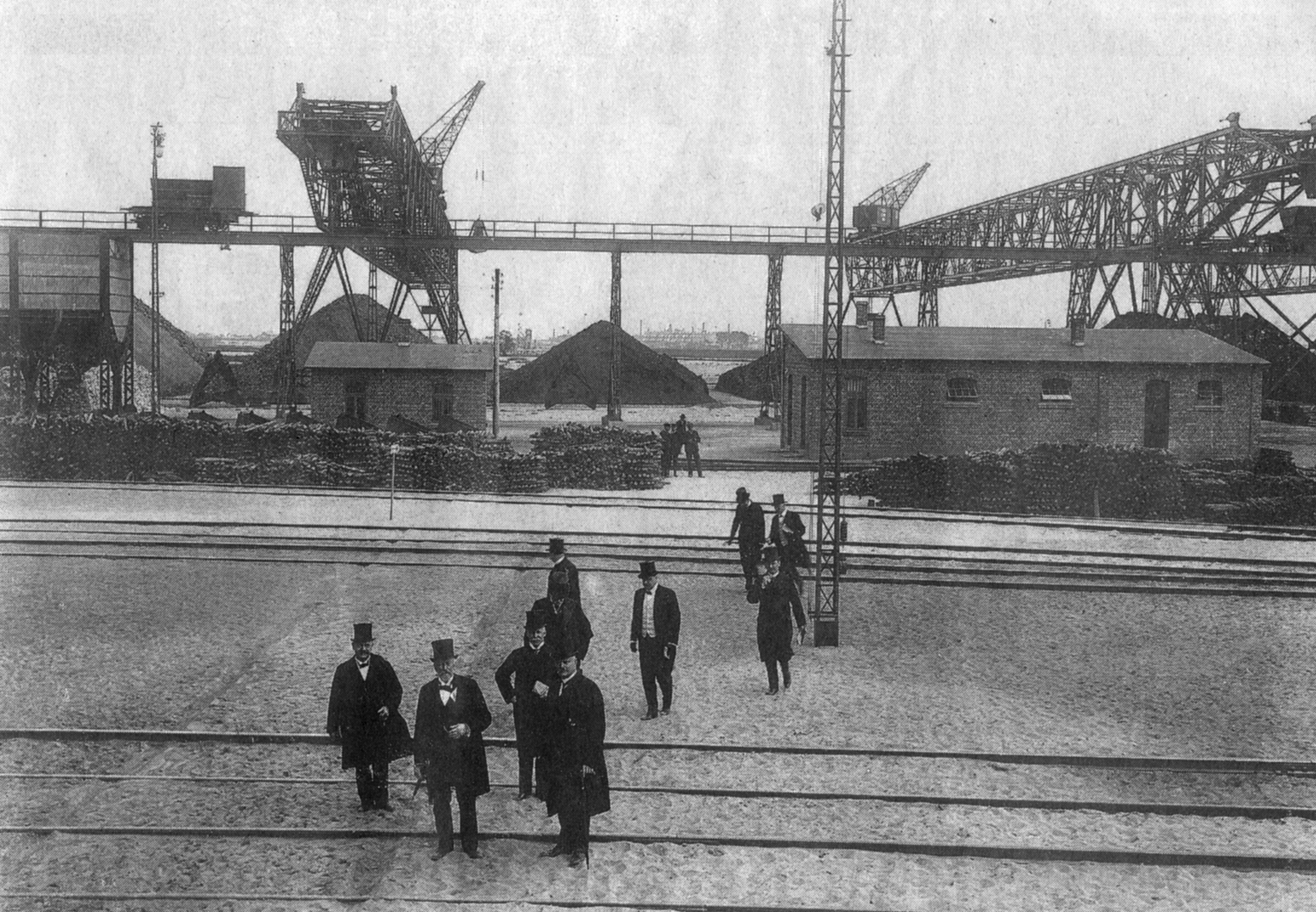
Norddeutsche Hütte c. 1911

In 1906 a consortium led by shipping firm Norddeutscher Lloyd was formed, and in 1908 established the Norddeutsche Hütte Aktiengesellschaft with a capital of 6 million Marks, and with Heinrich Wiegand as chairman. In the same period the port of Bremen was developed, with the construction of the central harbour (1907–10). Deliveries of iron ore by sea began in 1910, and in on 2 April 1911 the first of two blast furnaces built became operational. Other initially built facilities included 80 coke ovens with associated ammonia and tar plants. By 1912 a (slag) cement plant, benzene plant, third blast furnace, and a further 40 coke ovens had been installed; additionally coke gas was supplied to the Bremen region. Initial plans to add steel plant, foundry and rolling mills were not completed – the plant's main product pig iron was shipped to the Ruhr region.

In 1922 the Stumm group (Saar) became a major shareholder; after 1927 Krupp became the major shareholder. Much of the workforce was also from outside Bremen, both from Westphalia and from Poland. During the Great Depression two blast furnaces and the cement plant were idled, and 850 workers laid off, with the workforce reduced to a low of around 200 in 1933. Blast furnaces were restarted in 1935 and 1937/8. As part of economic policy toward self-sufficiency under Nazi Germany a steel production plant was added, and ferrovanadium production began. Forced labour was introduced, with Otto Hofmann installed as a technical director at the plant. During the Second World War the workforce reached 1500, of which half were forced labourers.

Bombing practically ended production at the plant by 1945. As part of reparations after the war, the vanadium plant was shipped to France. The blast furnaces were demolished in 1949, whilst the coking plant was retained, due to its necessity in supplying Bremen with gas. The cement plant was also retained for rebuilding work, supplied with bricks from destroyed buildings.

In 1954 Klöckner took over the Norddeutsche Hütte.

=== 1954-present ===
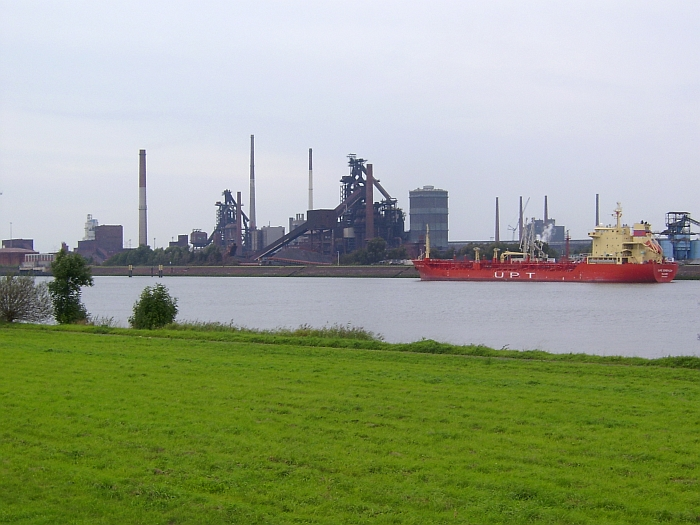
Stahlwerke Bremen from the opposite bank of the River Weser (2005)

The first stage of redevelopment was completed in 1957 at a cost of c. 400 million Deutschmarks, giving a capacity of c. 600,000 tons steel pa. Facilities included three open hearth steelmaking furnaces, a hot rolling mill for coil and sheets, and a tinplate plant. In 1960 the board at Klöckner authorised a second phase (200 million Deutschmarks) to increase capacity to 1 million tons. In 1960 the ultimate aim was to develop the site as a full steel mill with a production capacity of 4 to 5 million tons of steel pa. By the 1960s the workforce had risen to 6,000 – many of the new workers were immigrants, predominately from Turkey. Second and third blast furnaces were completed in the mid-1960s and early-1970s respectively; Linz-Donawitz process steelmaking converters were added in 1968 at a cost of 92 million Deutschmarks.

A galvanising line called BREGAL (Bremer Galvanisierungs GmbH) was authorised in 1991, as a joint venture between Klöckner, Ägäis Stahlhandel and Rautaruukki.

During the mid-1980s oversupply compounded a weakened economic situation (see Steel crisis) leading to financial problems for the company. In order to prevent bankruptcy, Klöckner sought to have written off 40% of a 175 million Deutschmark loan from the European Coal and Steel Community – in return Klöckner agreed to reduce production capacity from 4.2 to 3.7 million tons pa. In late 1993 a consortium comprising Klöckner (33.35%) and mainly public funding from the Hanseatische Industrie Beteiligungen GmbH (HIBEG) (31.99%) and Stadtwerke Bremen AG (SW) (13.33%) proposed re-capitalising the business (c. 250 million Deutschmarks, plus loans), as Klöckner Stahl GmbH, after acquiring the business for a nominal sum; due to the largely public nature of the shareholders the proposal was investigated by the European Union under its state aid rules.

In July 1994, an altered consortium incorporating private steel firm Sidmar (25% stake) was given permission by the European Commission to acquire the business. Blast furnace 3 was permanently closed in 1994, reducing production capacity by 500,000 tons pa. In 1994 Sidmar acquired a controlling stake (51%) in the company.

A subsidiary providing tailored blanks, Tailored Blank Bremen GmbH, was added in 1998, and a second galvanising line, BREGAL 2, in 2001.

In 2002 the company became part of Arcelor through the merger of its parent and in 2006 the company was renamed Arcelor Bremen GmbH. In 2007 the company became part of ArcelorMittal through merger of the parent holding company.

In 2008 a subsidiary at Muuga Harbour in Estonia, formerly Galvex (established in 1997), renamed ArcelorMittal Tallinn, was acquired and added an additional galvanising line. In 2011 a subsidiary ArcelorMittal Bottrop GmbH. was acquired from RAG and added a supplying coking plant in Bottrop.
