= Forges de la Providence =

Société Anonyme des laminoirs, forges, fonderies et usines de la Providence
- Industry: Steel
- Founded: 1836
- Successor: Cockerill-Sambre
- Headquarters: Marchienne-au-Pont, Charleroi, Belgium
- Subsidiaries: Providence Russe (1898-1902)

Forges de la Providence (French pronunciation: [fɔʁʒ də la pʁɔvidɑ̃s]) was a Belgian steel producing company based in the Hainaut region around Charleroi. Founded as Société Anonyme des laminoirs, forges, fonderies et usines de la Providence the company had three steel production sites at Marchienne-au-Pont in Belgium, and Réhon and Hautmont in France.

The company was independent until 1966 when it became part of the Cockerill-Ougrée, briefly being absorbed into Thy-Marcinelle et Monceau before becoming part of Cockerill-Sambre.

In the 1980s the French steel plants closed, the Belgian plant continued to operate until 2008, becoming part of the Duferco group as Carsid at the beginning of the 21st century. Coke and blast furnace production CARSID plant closed in 2008 due to an economic downturn, and did not restart - the plant was closed in 2012.

== Company history ==
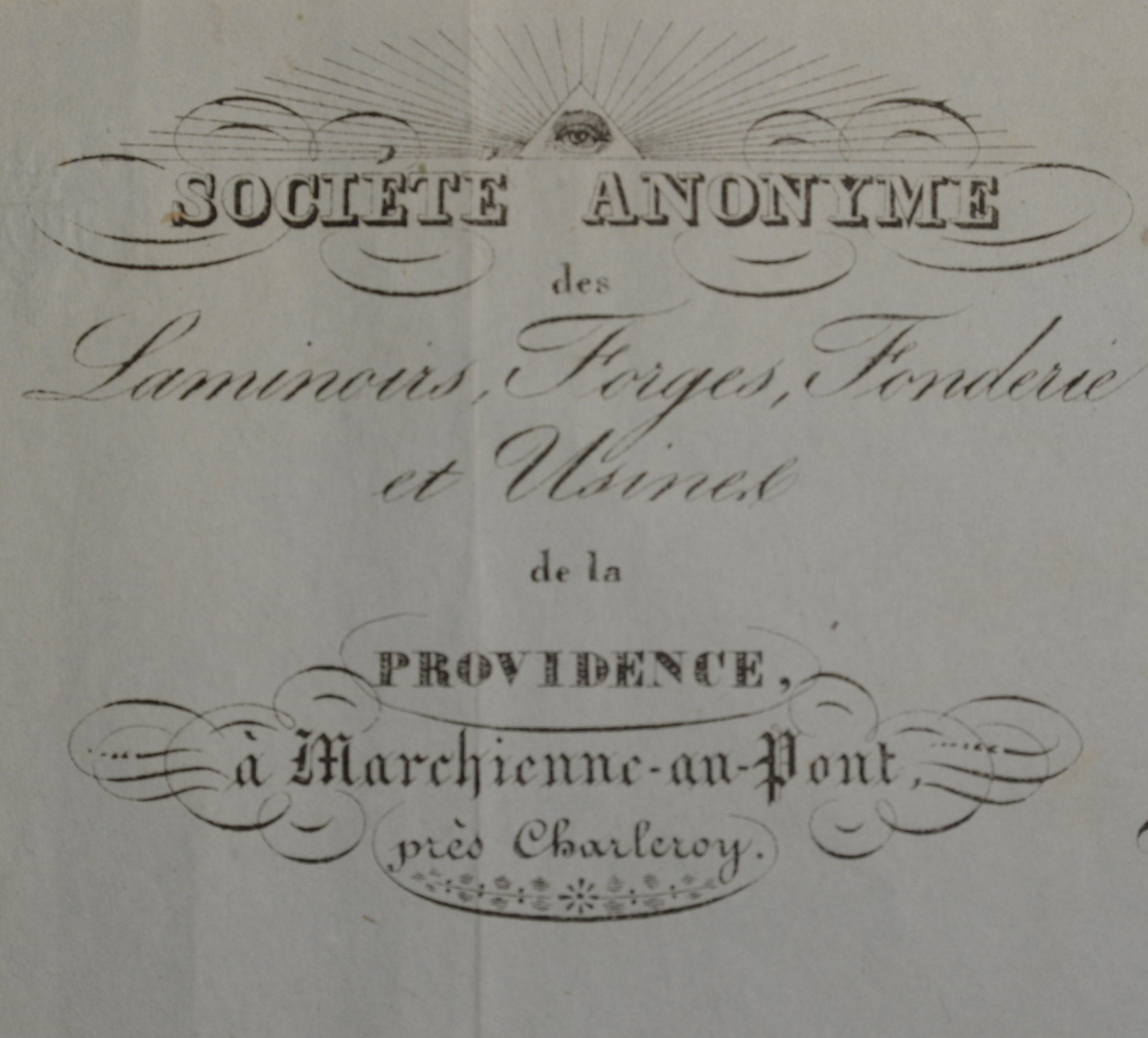
Letterhead in 1838.

In 1836 the Englishman Thomas Bonehill built puddling furnaces for the Puissant and Licot de Nîmes families; in 1838 the company Société Anonyme des laminoirs, forges, fonderies et usines de la Providence was formed by Clément-Joseph Delbruyère together with Edmond et Jules Puissant and Thomas Bonehill with a permitted capital of 1500,000 francs in order to construct a coke fire blast furnace, together with other equipment from Puissant and Bonehill's company la société le grand laminoir de la Providence, including steam engines (50 and 80 hp), and metal working equipment including hammers, four rolling mills, shears, puddling furnaces, casting equipment and molds as well as associated land, workshops and offices, and refractory brick manufacturing facilities.

The first steelworks was at Marchienne-au-Pont, Charleroi (Belgium); in 1843 the company decided to construct a second steelworks in Hautmont (France), equipped to produce plate and rails in expectation of orders for the construction of the French railways. In 1849 Bonehill's successor Alphonse Halbou patented a method for the production of I-beams by rolling.

Later, another steelworks in Réhon (France) was constructed, and the first blast furnace began production in 1866.

In 1898 a subsidiary SA Providence Russe opened a steelworks in Russia. The Russian company, based in Sartana nr. Mariupol, on the Sea of Azov, made heavy losses, and by 1902 went into administration, owing 6 million francs to the Providence company, and had to be re-financed by the Banque de l'Union Parisienne.

During the lifetime of the firm the three steel plants expanded.

In 1966 the Société Générale de Belgique had a majority shareholding in both Cockerill-Ougrée (Liege) and in the Forges de la Providence and decided to merge the two firms, forming Cockerill-Ougrée-Providence (Charleroi). This was contrary to the trade unions' preference for regional consolidation; the balance was not restored until 1979 when Thy-Marcinelle et Monceau (TMM) acquired the La Providence group from Cockerill-Ougrée-Providence et Espérance Longdoz, becoming Thy-Marcinelle-Providence. The Rehon plant became part of the Usinor group in November 1979.

In 1981 the company became part of the expanded Cockerill-Sambre.

=== Fate ===
The steelworks in France closed in the 1980s. The steelworks in Marchienne-au-Pont, Charleroi became part of Usinor in 1999 and then in 2001 became part of the Duferco group as Carsid. Carsid ended primary steel production in 2008 and was closed in 2012.

== History of the steelworks ==
=== Marchienne-au-Pont ===
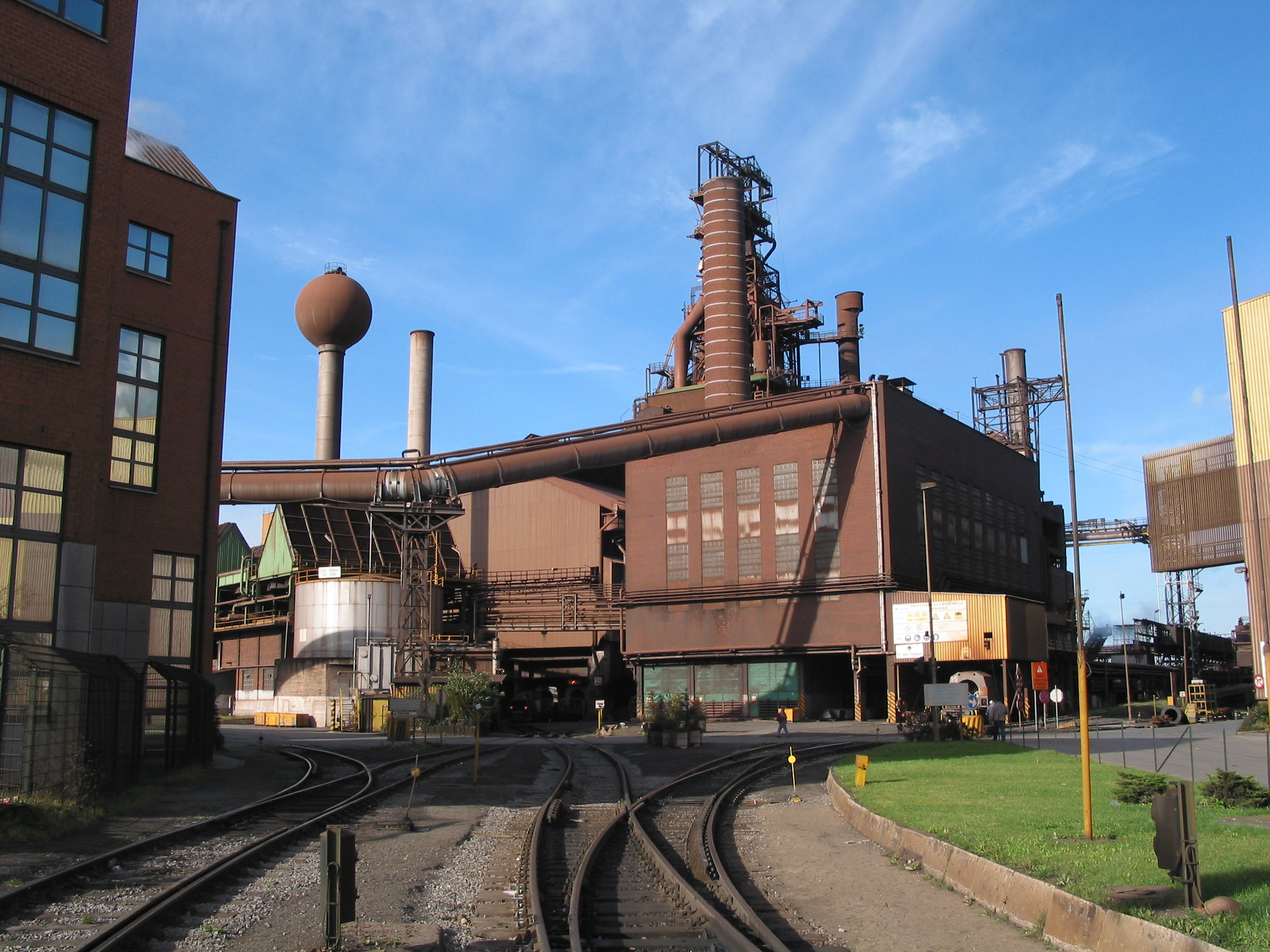
Carsid (2005)

The plant at Marchienne-au-Pont operated for over 100 years until in 2001 the plant began to be run down. The coking plant was no longer to be maintained, and the possibility of closure of blast furnace 4 also raised. Usinor entered discussions with the industrial group Duferco with a view to continue hot steel production at the plant.

In 2001 Carsid was created from the Charleroi plant at the same as the creation of Arcelor, and became part of the Duferco group. In 2006/7 the plant became part of a joint venture with Novolipetsk Steel : CARSID-SIF. In 2007 the blast furnace No.4 was recommissioned after a 3-month refurbishment process, in 2008 the sites coking plant was closed; the plant now being supplied through a strategic arrangement with Novolipetsk (Russia). Duferco used Carsid to supply slab to its other Belgian steelmaking works, Duferco La Louvière and Duferco Clabecq.

Blast furnace production was stopped in November 2008 due to low economic demand during the Great Recession. Production at the plant was halted for three years; by 2011 the joint venture between NLMK and Duferco had ended, with NLMK acquiring the joint venture's flat production at Clabecq and La Louviere and other sites for $600 million, supplied by its own blast furnaces; Duferco continued to seek a partner or buyer for Carsid.

In Mar. 2012 the Duferco announced that work at the blast furnace would not restart. Approximately 1000 people were to be made redundant by the end of 2012.

=== Hautmont-sur-Sambre ===
Opened in 1843 with a foundry and mills. The first blast furnace opened in 1845, additional blast furnaces were added in 1853, 1855 and 1890, in 1905 galvanising facilities were added. After complete modernisation between 1910 and 1914 the plant was entirely destroyed during the first world war. On reconstruction, the plant was constructed to utilise the Siemens-Martin process and the reconstruction funded by reparations from Germany. New rolling mills were added in 1921. The plant survived the second world war with little damage. After becoming part of Cockerill-Ougrée-Providence in 1966 and Cockerill-Sambre in 1981 the plant closed in 1985.

=== Rehon ===
The plant opened in 1866 with two blast furnaces in operation by 1867 with capacities of 60 and 80 tonnes per day. The works expanded with a third blast furnace in 1871, a Gilchrist–Thomas converter in 1911, fourth, fifth and sixth blast furnaces in 1922, 1930 and 1949. After the merger with Cockerill-Ougrée the factory was transferred to Usinor in 1979, and in 1984 became part of Unimétal, before closing in 1987.
