= Guillermo Ulacia =

- Born: Guillermo Ulacia Arnaiz
- Occupation: Vice President of Aceralia

Guillermo Ulacia Arnaiz serves as Vice President of Aceralia Corporation Siderurgica SA.

== Biography ==
Arnaiz served as the chief executive officer of Gamesa Corporación Tecnológica from December 1, 2005. He has previously served as Vice Chairman of General Motors Corp, Spanish unit; he also served as Executive Chairman since July 2006 until October 2009.

Arnaiz worked for 10 years, as a Director of flat steel products at Arcelor before becoming Vice President.

Arnaiz serves as Co-Chairman of the Aceralia Management Committee, member of the General Management of the Arbed Group.
