= Altos Hornos de Vizcaya =

Former Spanish metallurgy company

Altos Hornos de Vizcaya, S.A.
- Company type: Sociedad Anónima
- Traded as: BMAD: AHV
- ISIN: ES0142090317
- Industry: Steel
- Founded: 1902; 124 years ago
- Headquarters: Bilbao, Spain
- Key people: Juan-Miguel Villar Mir, 1st Marquess of Villar Mir (Chairman)
- Number of employees: ▼1,830 (1996)

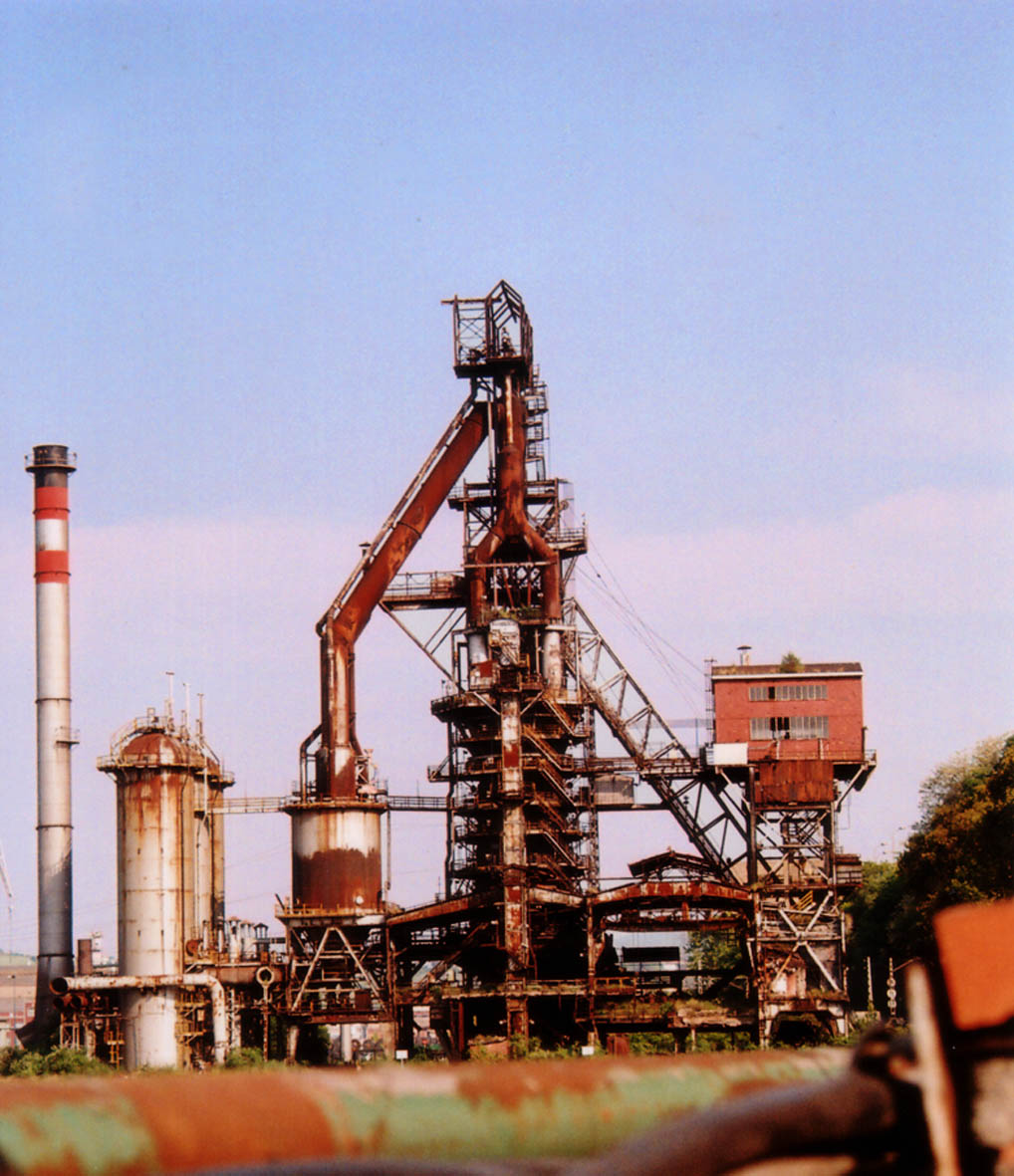
The only remaining old furnace in Sestao

Altos Hornos de Vizcaya, S.A. was a Spanish metallurgy manufacturing company. It was the largest company in Spain for much of the 20th century, employing 40,000 workers at its height. The business began in 1902 in Bilbao with the merger of three iron and steel businesses: Altos Hornos de Bilbao, La Vizcaya, and La Iberia. In the 1990s, following a series of mergers, it joined with Arcelor.

The location was chosen for the iron mineral resources around Bilbao, the proximity to a sea port, and the metallurgical tradition of the area. After the Spanish Civil War, the industry of Basque Country was left basically intact. This proved to be an attractive feature that drew many people during Spain's rural exodus. The business was thus one of the major forces responsible for the economic development of many of the municipalities of Biscay, including Barakaldo, Sestao, Portugalete, Ortuella, and Abanto y Ciérvana.

As a consequence of the implementation of the "Plan de Competitividad Conjunto AHV - Ensidesa", in December 1994 the CSI Group (Corporación Siderúrgica Integral) was formed, and it in turn was reorganized in 1997 forming the Aceralia Iron and Steel Corporation.

== See also ==
- List of preserved historic blast furnaces
- Altos Hornos del Mediterráneo
