= Thy-Marcinelle =

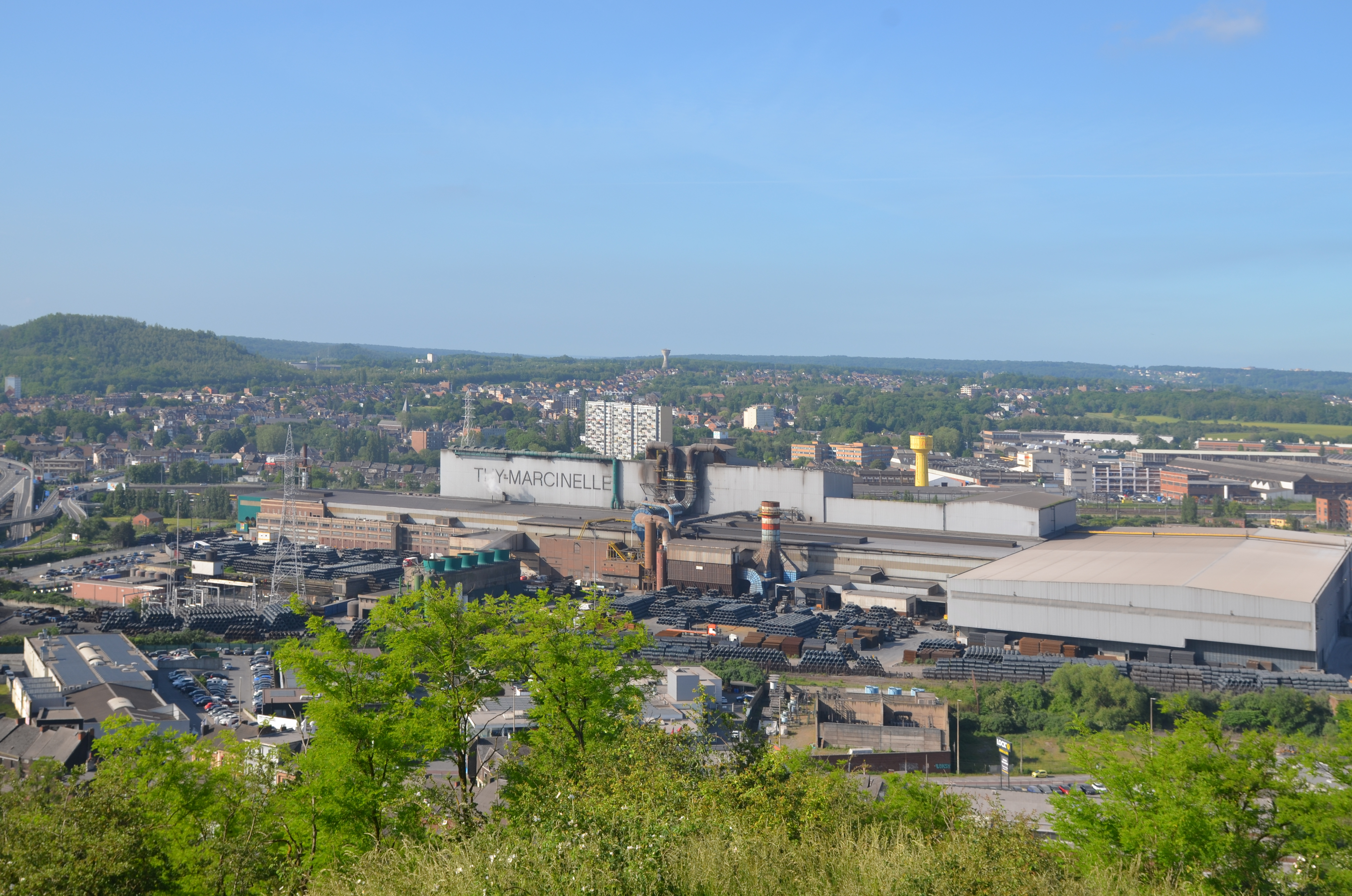
- Industry: Steel
- Headquarters: Charleroi, Belgium
- Parent: Gruppo Riva

Thy-Marcinelle is a steelworks in Charleroi, Belgium, a subsidiary of the Riva group. The company is the descendant of one part of various steel companies based in the Charleroi industrial basin. Its history traces back through Cockerill-Sambre to the predecessors of Hainaut-Sambre, the companies Thy-Marcinelle et Monceau and Thy-Marcinelle et Providence.

== History ==
=== Predecessors ===
The forge at Thy-le-Chateau dates to at least 1763.

The company of Thy-Marcinelle et Monceau (TMM) was formed in 1966 by the merger of Aciéries et Minières de la Sambre (formed 1936 when split from Ougrée-Marihaye) and the steelworks of Thy-le-Chateau, this company merged with the Forges de la Providence in 1979 forming the company Thy-Marcinelle et Providence (TMP). This group of companies merged with Hainaut-Sambre in 1980 and became part of the Cockerill-Sambre group in 1981.

=== Thy-Marcinelle ===
At the beginning of the 1990s the Italian Riva Group acquired a rolling mill in Charleroi, forming its subsidiary Thy-Marcinelle from it.

As of 2010 the plants facilities include electric furnaces, a continuous casting machine, reheating furnace and a wire mill (rebar).

The Thy-Marcinelle plant predominantly produces wire rod up to 16mm in diameter from steel with a low carbon content and coils of rod with improved grip for reinforced concrete and a limited quantity of rods for reinforced concrete bars.

The semi-finished products that feed the rolling mill are largely produced on site and only a tiny quantity is bought in from the full cycle plant. Rolling is only carried out on demand and with rapid production turnover so as to reduce stock.

The reinforcement bars for reinforced concrete are certified in Belgium, Germany, France, Holland, Switzerland and Sweden. They are sent to markets in Europe, North and South America, the Middle East, China and Oceania.

Clients include manufacturers of electro-welded mesh, drawn wire, electrodes (coated electrodes and welding wire), steel wool, cold-rolled products and other products made from drawn wire.

The plant has its own scrapyard and can deliver scrap metal by rail, road or water.
