= List of protected heritage sites in Oupeye =

This table shows an overview of the protected heritage sites in the Walloon town Oupeye. This list is part of Belgium's national heritage.

Object	Year/architect	Town/section	Address	Coordinates	Number^{?}	Image
The oak tree "Chenay" in "Dolhenchamps" ^{(nl)} ^{(fr)}		Oupeye		50.709416°N 5.636565°E	62079-CLT-0001-01 Info	
The remains of military architecture, including the arcade giving access to the church of Saint-Hubert and its old cemetery Haccourt ^{(nl)} ^{(fr)}		Oupeye		50.733648°N 5.666650°E	62079-CLT-0003-01 Info	De overblijfselen van militaire architectuur, inclusief de arcade die toegang tot de kerk van Saint-Hubert geeft en de oude begraafplaats te Haccourt. Het standbeeld van het Heilige hart (Sacré-choeur) en de vazen, die werden geplaatst zonder officiële toestemming, niet meegerekend
The archaeological site of Roman villa Haccourt bath unit and small cross-shaped cellar, with Père Pire square and field for further research ^{(nl)} ^{(fr)}		Oupeye		50.730336°N 5.665738°E	62079-CLT-0004-01 Info	
The church of Saint-Lambert ^{(nl)} ^{(fr)}		Oupeye	Hermalle-sous-Argenteau	50.710457°N 5.680755°E	62079-CLT-0006-01 Info	De kerk van Saint-Lambert
The chapel of Notre-Dame de Bon Secours and its environment ^{(nl)} ^{(fr)}		Oupeye		50.732173°N 5.686499°E	62079-CLT-0007-01 Info	De kapel van Notre-Dame de Bon Secours en haar omgeving (+ VISE/Visé)
Farm "Christophe": The main facade (north and south) and the gable on the east side ^{(nl)} ^{(fr)}		Oupeye	rue Fût Voie, 77	50.702379°N 5.660331°E	62079-CLT-0008-01 Info	

== See also ==
- List of protected heritage sites in Liège (province)
