= Oupeye =

Municipality in Liège Province, Wallonia, Belgium

Oupeye Oûpêye (Walloon)
- Municipality
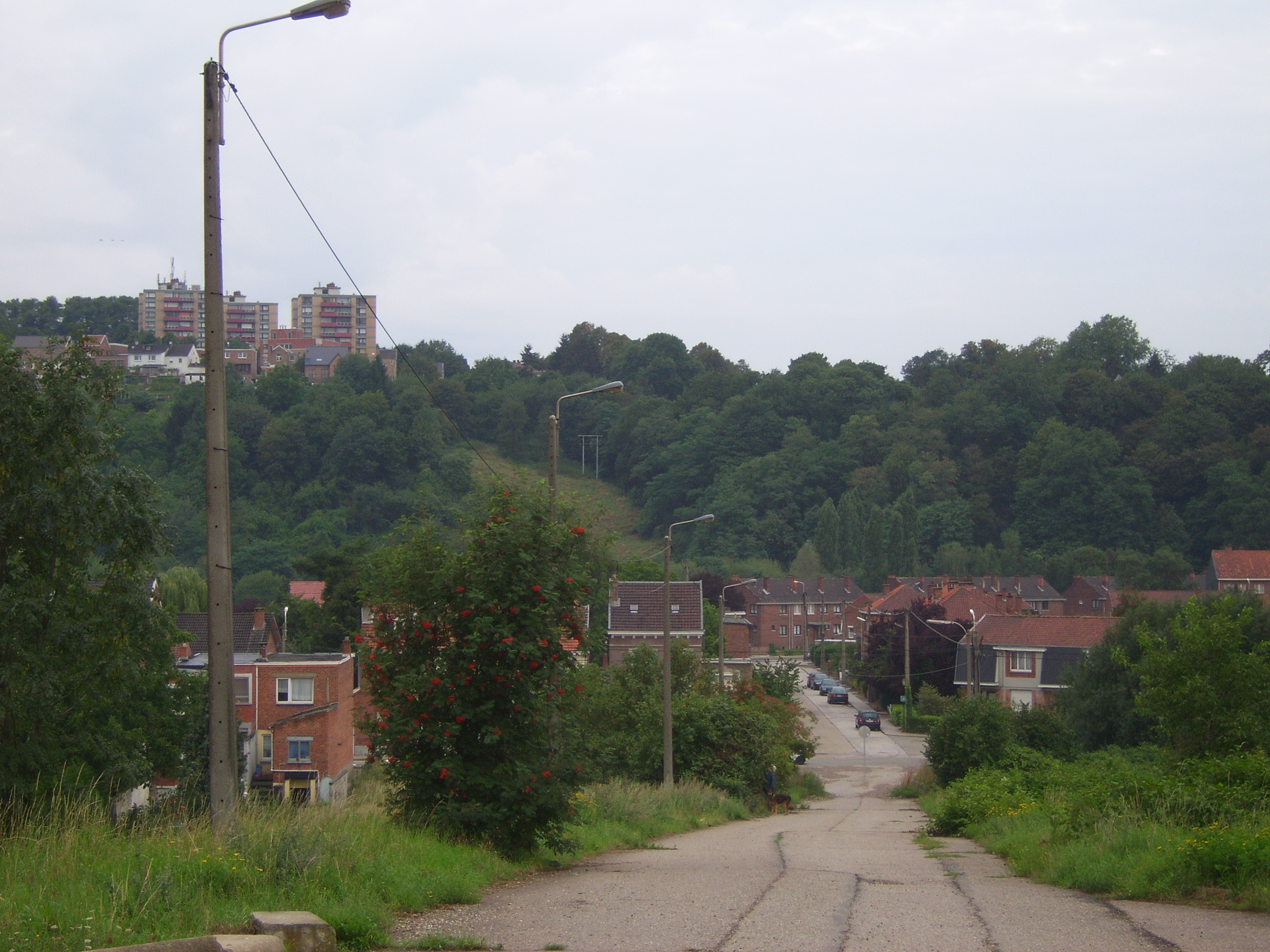

- Flag Coat of arms

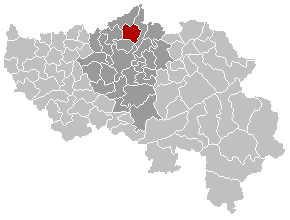
- Location of Oupeye in Liège province
- Interactive map of Oupeye
- Location in Belgium
- Coordinates: 50°42′N 05°39′E
- Country: Belgium
- Community: French Community
- Region: Wallonia
- Province: Liège
- Arrondissement: Liège

Government
  - Mayor: Serge Fillot (PS)
  - Governing parties: PS, CDH

Area
  - Total: 36.09 km^{2} (13.93 sq mi)

Population (2018-01-01)
  - Total: 25,297
  - Density: 700.9/km^{2} (1,815/sq mi)
- Postal codes: 4680-4684
- NIS code: 62079
- Area codes: 04
- Website: www.oupeye.be

Oupeye (French pronunciation: [upɛj]; Walloon: Oûpêye) is a municipality of Wallonia located in the province of Liège, Belgium.

On January 1, 2006, Oupeye had a total population of 23,581. The total area is 36.11 km^{2} which gives a population density of 653 inhabitants per km^{2}.

The municipality consists of the following districts: Haccourt, Hermalle-sous-Argenteau, Hermée, Heure-le-Romain, Houtain-Saint-Siméon, Oupeye, and Vivegnis.

== Chertal ==
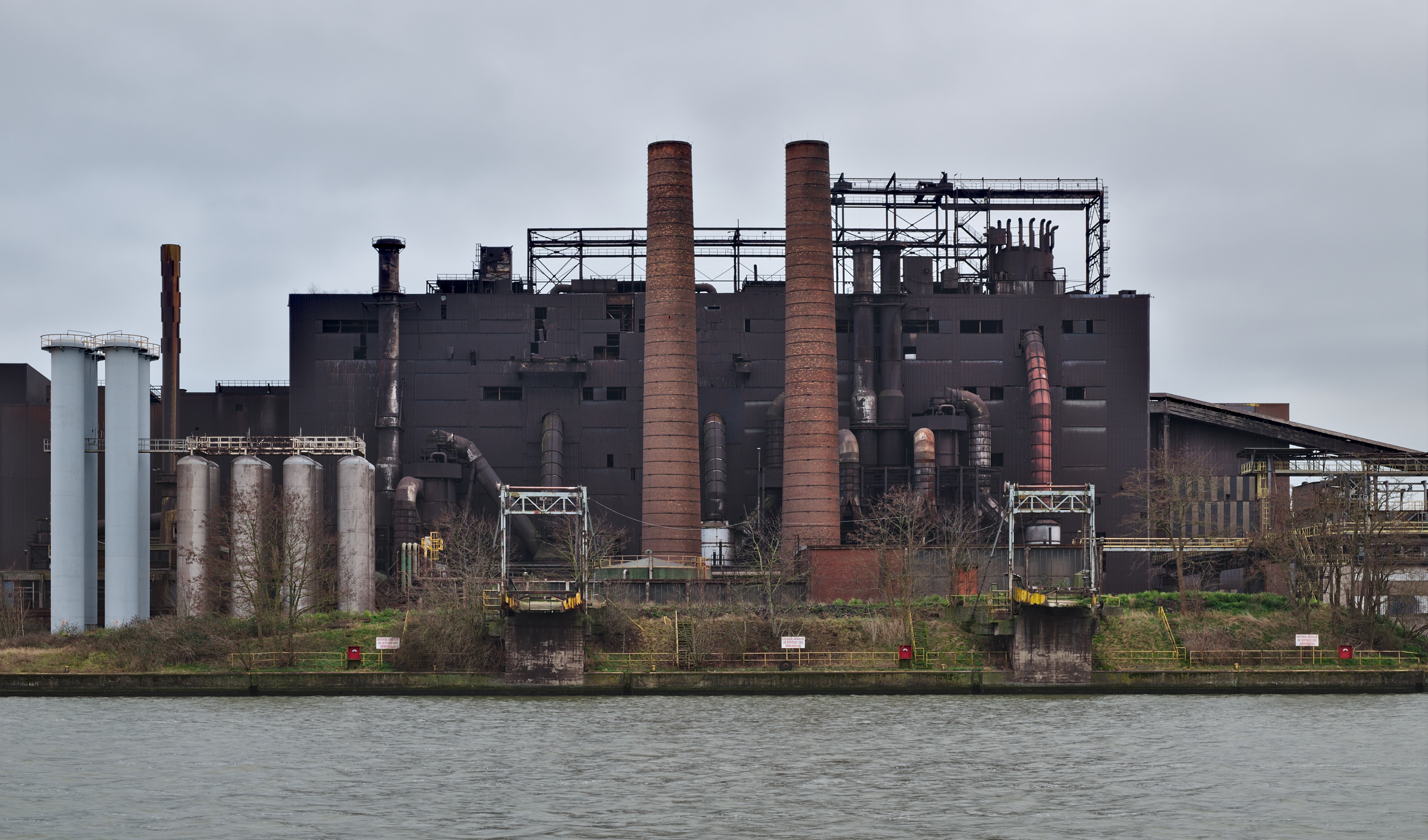
Abandoned Chertal steel factory

Chertal is a narrow isthmus approximately 1.5 km southeast of Oupeye bounded by the Albert Canal and Meuse. Since 1963 the land has been the site of a steel factory founded by Espérance-Longdoz (as of 2010 part of ArcelorMittal Liège).

== See also ==
- List of protected heritage sites in Oupeye
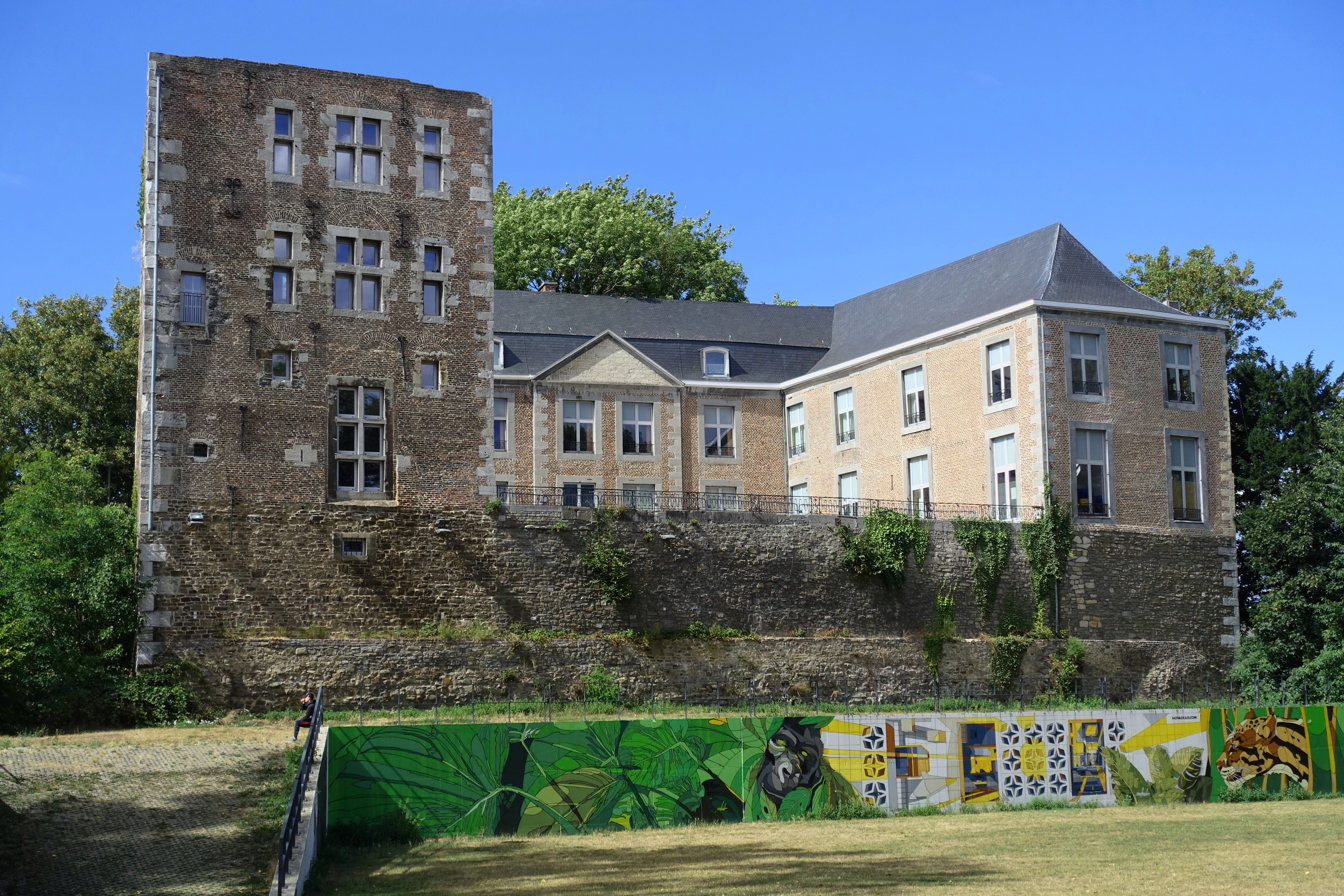
Castle of Oupeye

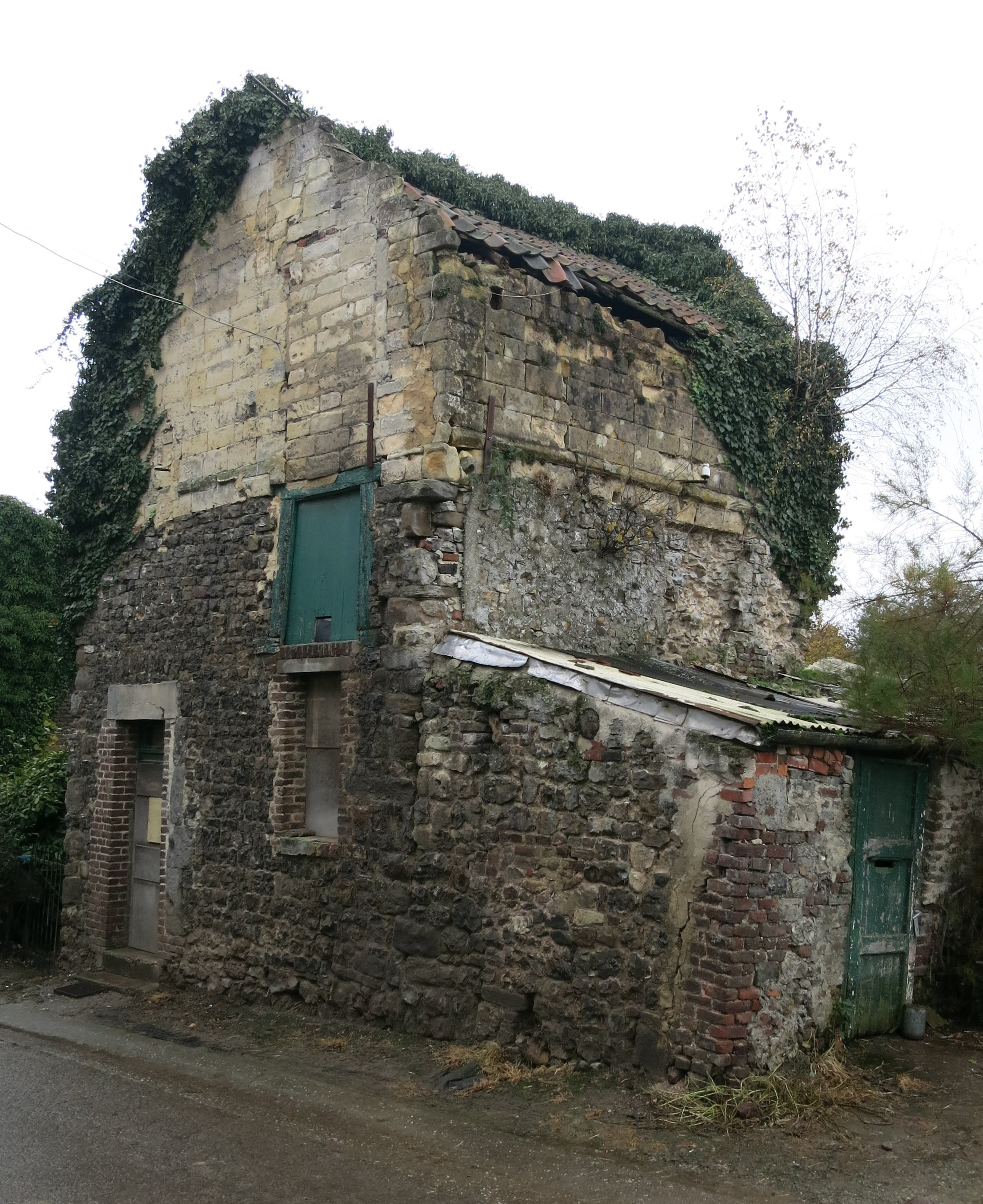
Rest of medieval keep in Hauts de Froidmont

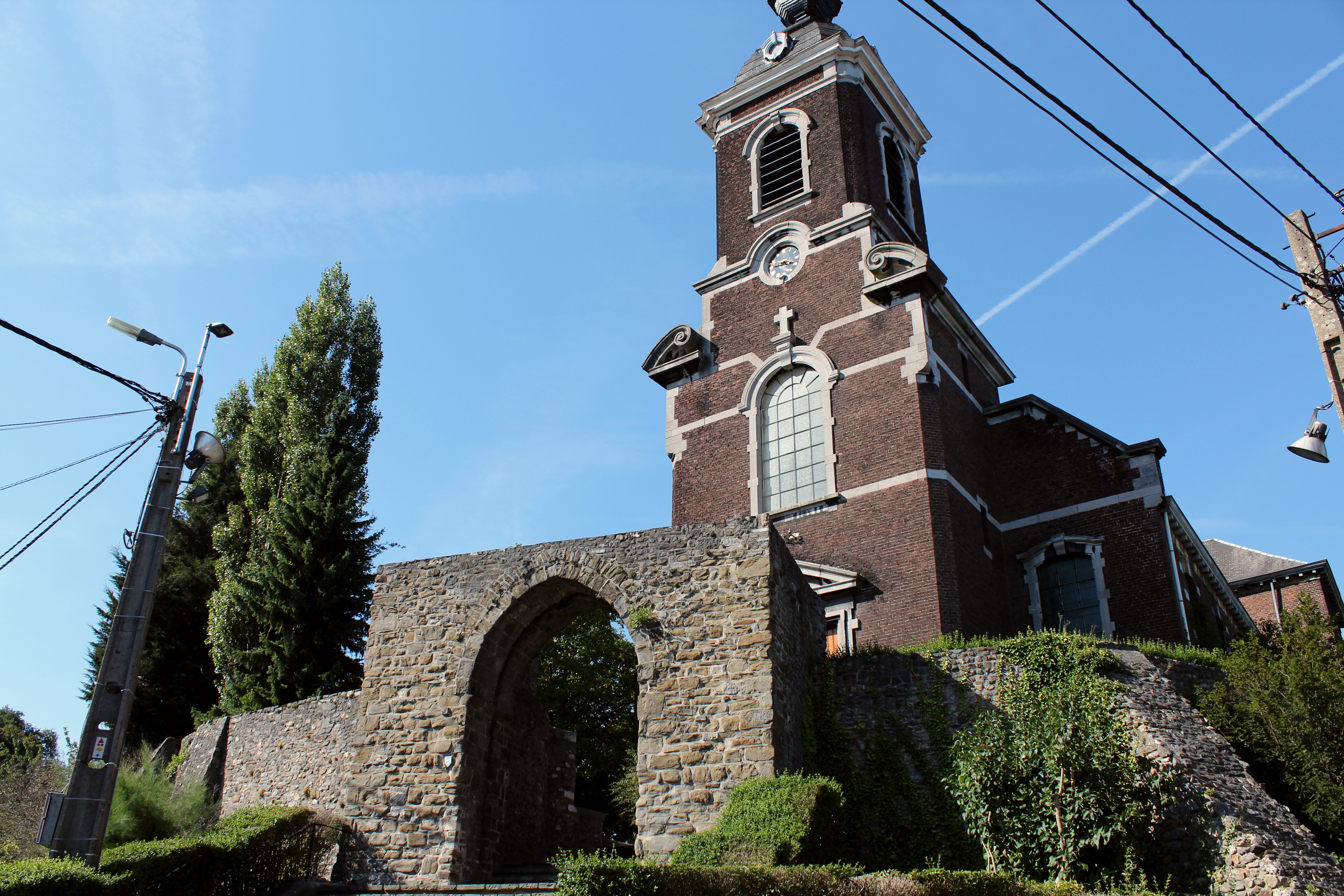
Ruins of castle around church in Haccourt
