= Veriña =

- Parish
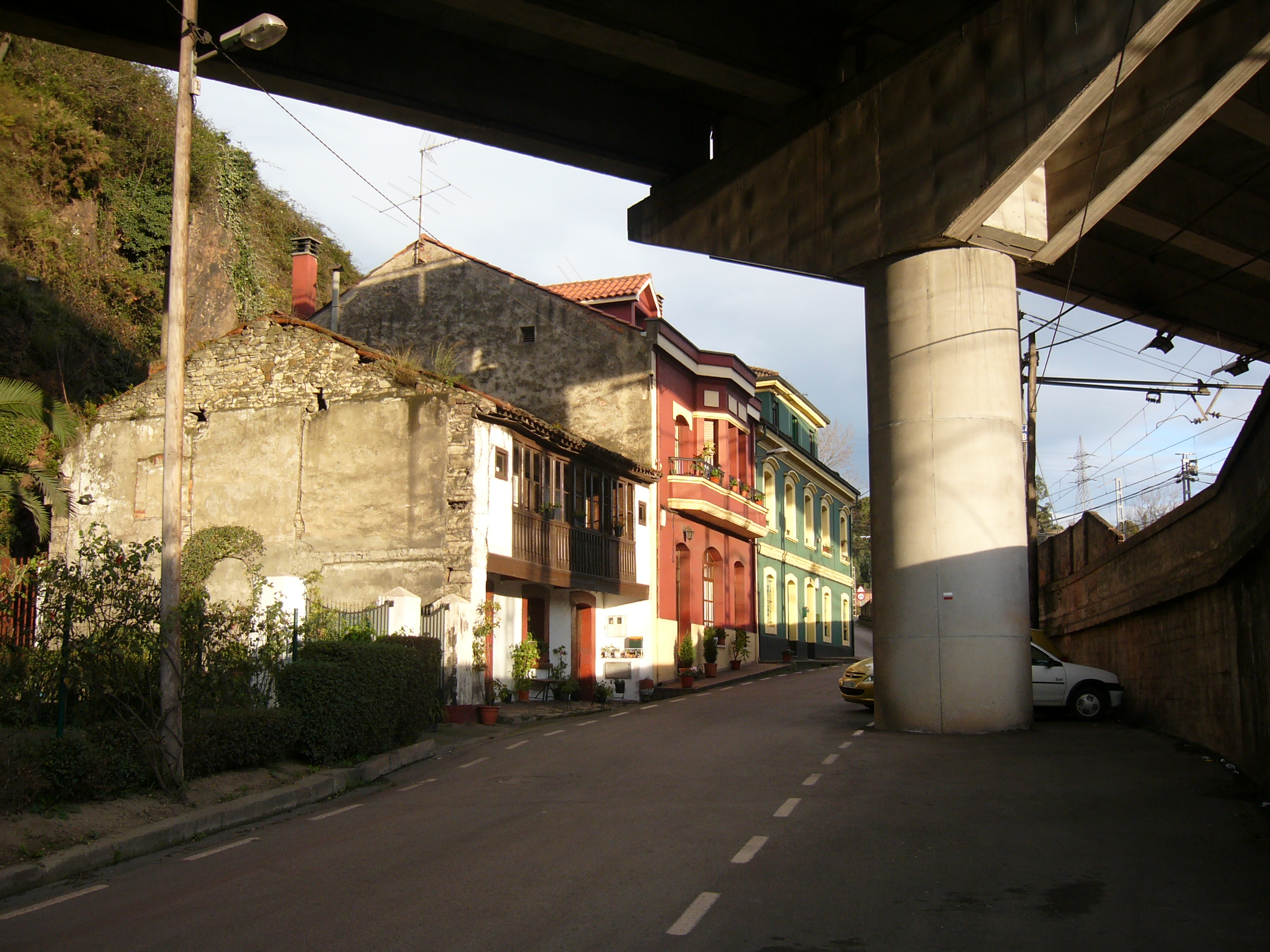
- Access road to the FEVE station
- Interactive map of Veriña
- Coordinates: 43°32′25″N 5°43′02″W
- Country: Spain
- Autonomous community: Asturias
- Province: Asturias
- Municipality: Gijón

Population (2012)
  - Total: 177

Veriña is the smallest district (parroquia rural) of the municipality of Gijón / Xixón, in Asturias, Spain.

The population of Veriña was 194 in 2005 and 177 in 2008.

Veriña is located in the west of Gijón, being an important industrial and railway axis due to its closeness to the factory of Arcelor.

== Villages and its neighbourhoods ==
Veriña de Baxo

- La Estación
- El Puente Secu
- Samartín

Veriña de Riba

- La Campina
- El Campón
- La Falconera
- El Monte
