= Tailored blank =

Semi-finished part

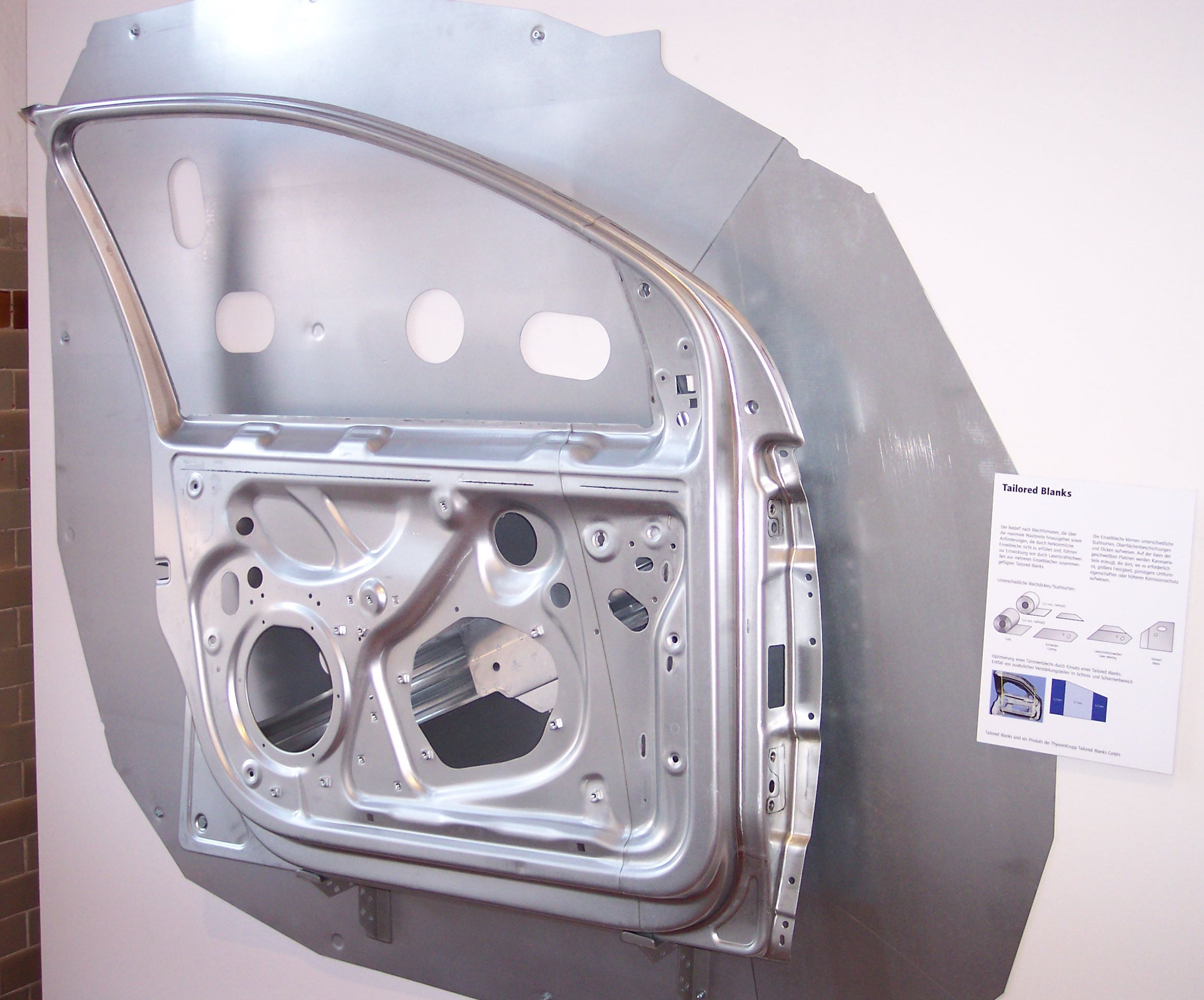
Tailor welded blank behind a lightweight door inner panel

Tailored blanks are semi-finished parts, which are typically made from sheets with different alloys, thicknesses, coatings or material properties. After joining, these will be subjected to deep drawing or stamping.

Tailored blanks were developed by ThyssenKrupp to make sheets that were wider than those made on available rolling mills of the time. These days, tailored blanks are used to make items such as door panels which are thick near the hinges and thin near the lock to withstand different types of loads or corrosion attacks. They are lighter and often cheaper than conventional sheets. Tailored Blanks are typically made from steel. Aluminium and dissimilar material tailored blanks are also available but less common.

== Types ==
- Tailor Welded Blanks (TWB) are welded from different sheets in the butt joint configuration. This is normally achieved by laser welding, electron beam welding or friction stir welding.
- Tailored Strips are continuously welded strips.
- Tailored Coils are continuously welded coils.
- Tailor Rolled Blanks (TRB) are sheets with a continuous thickness transition. These different blank thicknesses are made on a cold rolling mill.
- Patchwork Blanks are sheets that are locally reinforced by attaching smaller sheets (patches) in the lap configuration by laser welding or adhesives.
- Tailored Tubes (TT) are tubular components with variations in thickness or strength, e.g. to be used in hydroforming.
- Tailored Orbitals (TO) are doughnut shaped tubes of which the ends are welded face to face for automotive and industrial applications.
- Tailor Heat Treated Blanks are sheets that exhibit locally different material properties. A local heat treatment is used to change the properties of aluminium alloys, for example, that show precipitation hardening. With this technology, the material properties can be optimised for subsequent deep drawing operations or for the final industrial application.
