= ArcelorMittal Ghent =

Belgian steelworks situated in Ghent near Zelzate, Flanders

Coordinates: 51.172052°N 3.80157°E

- Formerly: Sidmar (1960–2006); Arcelor Ghent (2006–2008)
- Industry: Steel
- Founder: 1962
- Headquarters: Ghent, Belgium
- Products: Flat steel
- Parent: ArcelorMittal

ArcelorMittal Ghent is a Belgian steelworks situated in Ghent near Zelzate, Flanders. It was founded in 1962 by ARBED as Sidmar; the first maritime steel producer in Belgium.

== History ==
=== Background ===
Traditionally the steelworks of Belgium had been concentrated in the southern half of the country, in Wallonia, close to the historic coal mining areas at the edge of the Rhenish Massif; which in part defined the area that came to be known as the Sillon industriel, including Liège Province and Hainaut Province.

In the 1920s the Luxembourg-based steel company ARBED began buying land next to the Ghent–Terneuzen Canal, by 1932 the company had acquired 211 ha (2.11 km^{2}). Economic depression in the 1930s, the second world war and its aftermath prevented plans for a new steel plant;. however by the 1950s the economic conditions had become favourable again, and the company began exploring the possibility of a plants' construction.

At the beginning of the 1960s preliminary work began towards the construction of a new plant; the canal was to be dredged to enable Panamax size ships to use the canal, Arbed's land holding increased to 211 ha (2.11 km^{2}), and on 27 April 1962 the European Coal and Steel Community approved the plants construction. The company Siderurgie Maritime NV (Sidmar) was formed on 10 July 1962, with a capital of 4.5billion Belgian franc, of which 2bn came from Arbed, as well as 1bn from Cockerill-Sambre. Schneider, the Société Générale de Belgique, Compagnie Belge de Participations (COBEPA) and Compagnie Financière et Industrielle (COFININDUS) also backed the scheme, and loans were got from state banks.

Amongst the steelworkers of the Walloon region the development was not so well received; in May 1960 union leader André Renaud declared it to be:

La guillotine de la Wallonie.

=== Sidmar ===
Construction began in 1964, with a cold rolling mill completed in March 1966, and a hot rolling operational by the end of that year, the first blast furnace in 1967 and a second in 1968. Expansion continued in the early 1970s with a coking factory and second cold rolling mill.

The 1973–75 recession caused a crisis in the global steel market in the mid-1970s. Though the company fared better than the southern Belgian steel producers, investors other than Arbed disposed of their shares; Cockerill sold its 21.9 share to Arbed in 1975 due to its own financial problems, giving Arbed, which had previously increased its holding to 62.2% by 1973 a large majority shareholding of over 80%.

By the beginning of the 1980s some re-investment and expansion started again; a continuous rolling mill in 1981, as well as acquiring stakes in ALZ, and Klöckner Stahl. In 1989 Sidmar's steel capacity represented 30% of total Belgian steel production. In 1994 Sidmar acquired majority share ownership of Stahlwerke Bremen (formerly Klöckner Stahl) from Klöckner.

Further investment in the 1990s and 2000s gave the plant galvanising facilities (through a joint venture Galtec with Dutch steelmaker Hoogovens opened 1998, and renamed Sidgal in 2002, followed by two more lines Sidgal 2 and Sidgal 3 in 2000.) and later the ability to continuous cast slab steel, as well as blast furnace expansion.

In 2002, as part of Arbed the company became part of Arcelor, and was renamed Arcelor Ghent in 2006.

=== ArcelorMittal Ghent ===
Under ArcelorMittal ownership production continued, as ArcelorMittal Ghent. The company produces ~5million tonnes pa of flat steel, with automotive manufacturers being a major source of custom. Flat steel is produced as hot or electrolytically galvanised, and plastic coated steel. The plant produces steel from ore, and has coking plants, Sinter Plants (blast furnace feedstock production), blast furnaces of total capacity over 4million tonnes pa, and hot and cold rolling facilities.

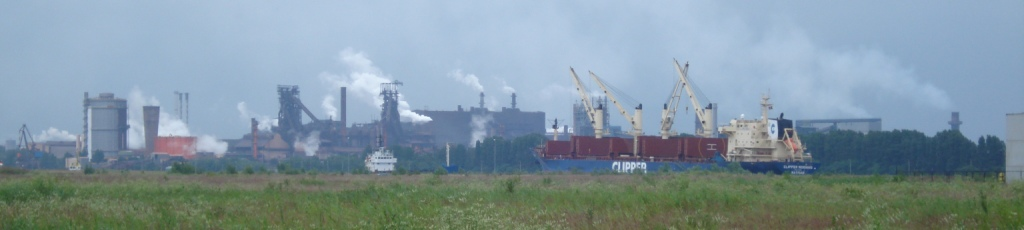
view of ArcelorMittal Ghent (2008)
