= Aceralia =

Spanish steel producer

- Traded as: BMAD: ACR
- ISIN: ES0138991015
- Industry: Steel
- Predecessor: Corporacion de la Siderurgia Integral (1991) formed from Ensidesa (1950); Altos Hornos de Vizcaya (1902)
- Founded: 1997
- Defunct: 2002
- Successor: Arcelor
- Revenue: ▲269.546 billion ₧ (1997)
- Net income: ▲14.047 billion ₧ (1997)
- Total assets: ▲465.174 ₧ (1997)
- Number of employees: ▲12,460 (1997)
- Website: www.aceralia.es

Aceralia was a large Spanish steel producer formed in 1997 by restructuring of a group formed from earlier mergers of the steel producers ENSIDESA and Altos Hornos de Vizcaya. The company merged into Arcelor in 2001, and became part of ArcelorMittal in 2006.

== History ==
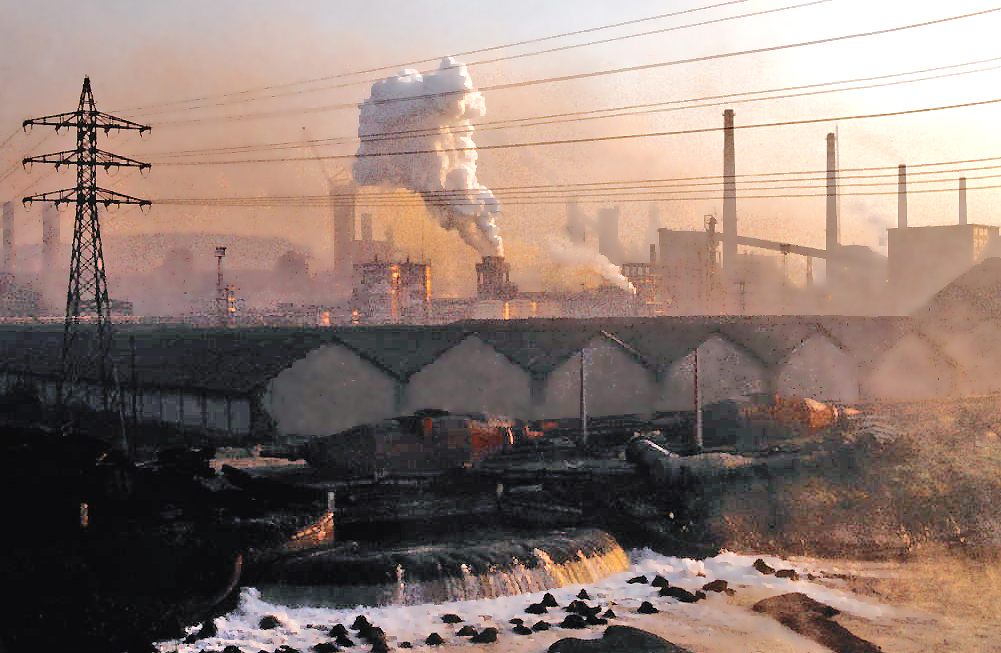
The plant at Avilés in 1979

In 1950 the state owned company Empresa Nacional Siderúrgica Sociedad Anónima (ENSIDESA) was formed in Avilés over a 11km by 0.5km campus with 14,000 employees, to increase Spain's steel production, part of the industrialisation and modernisation of Spain. This led to the Spanish economic miracle of the 1960s. In 1973 the state owned company was forced to take over the Asturian steel company UNINSA, which owned works in Veriña, and which had invested heavily in a fully integrated steel works but did not have the capital to fund it. At some point in the 1970s, ENSIDESA employed as many as 27,000 workers.

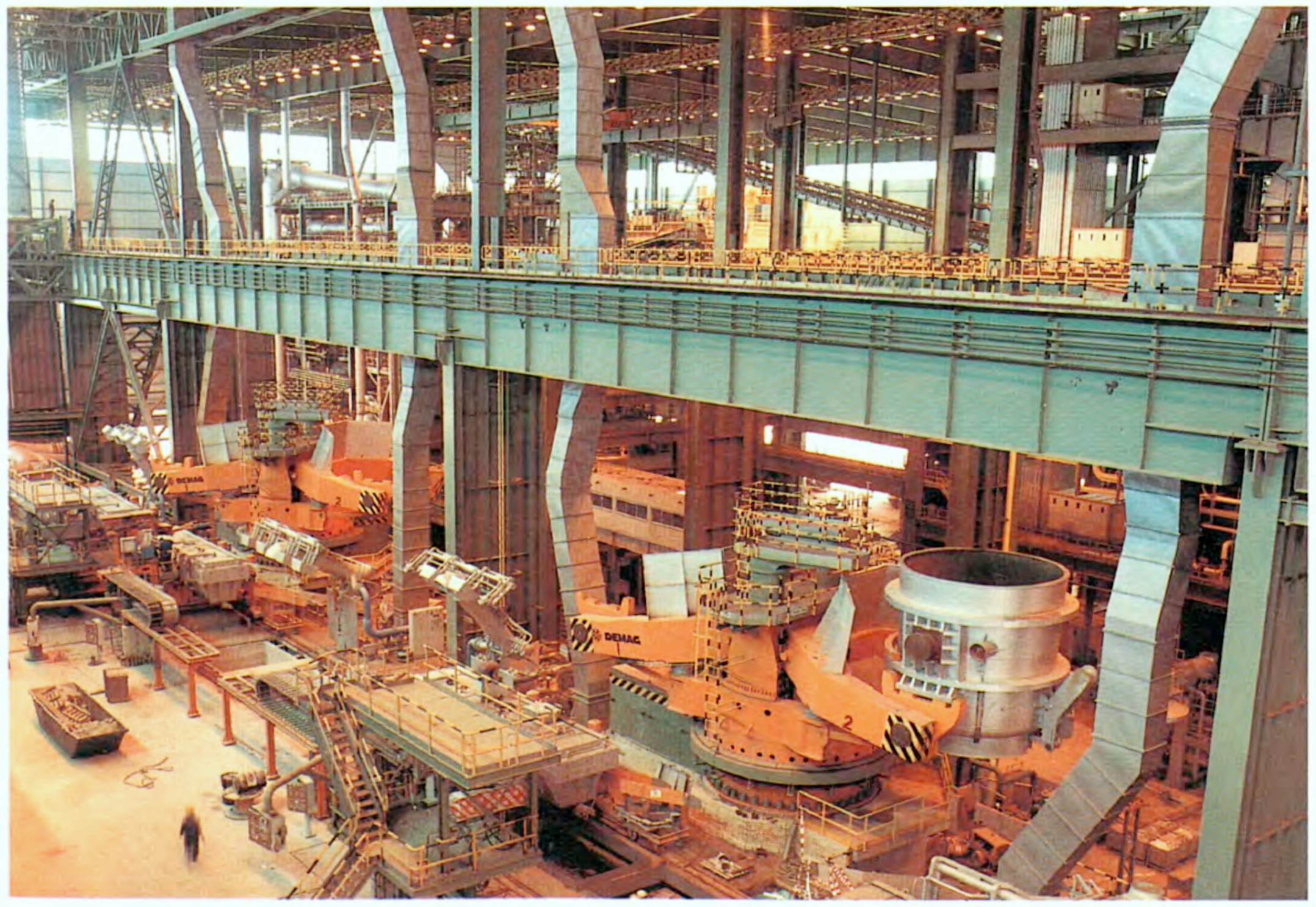
Continuous casting aisle at Avilés in 1988

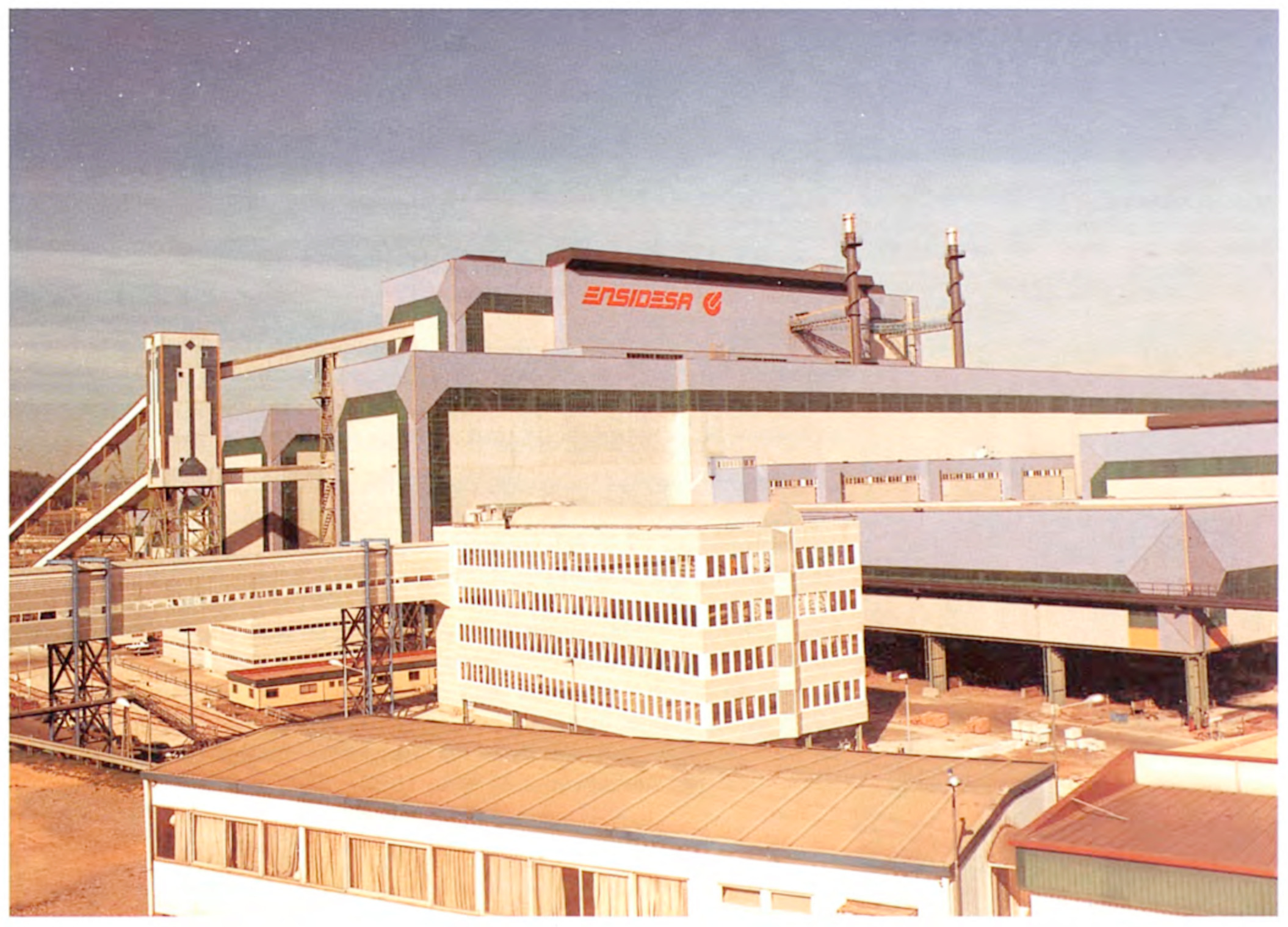
External view of the Avilés plant in 1988

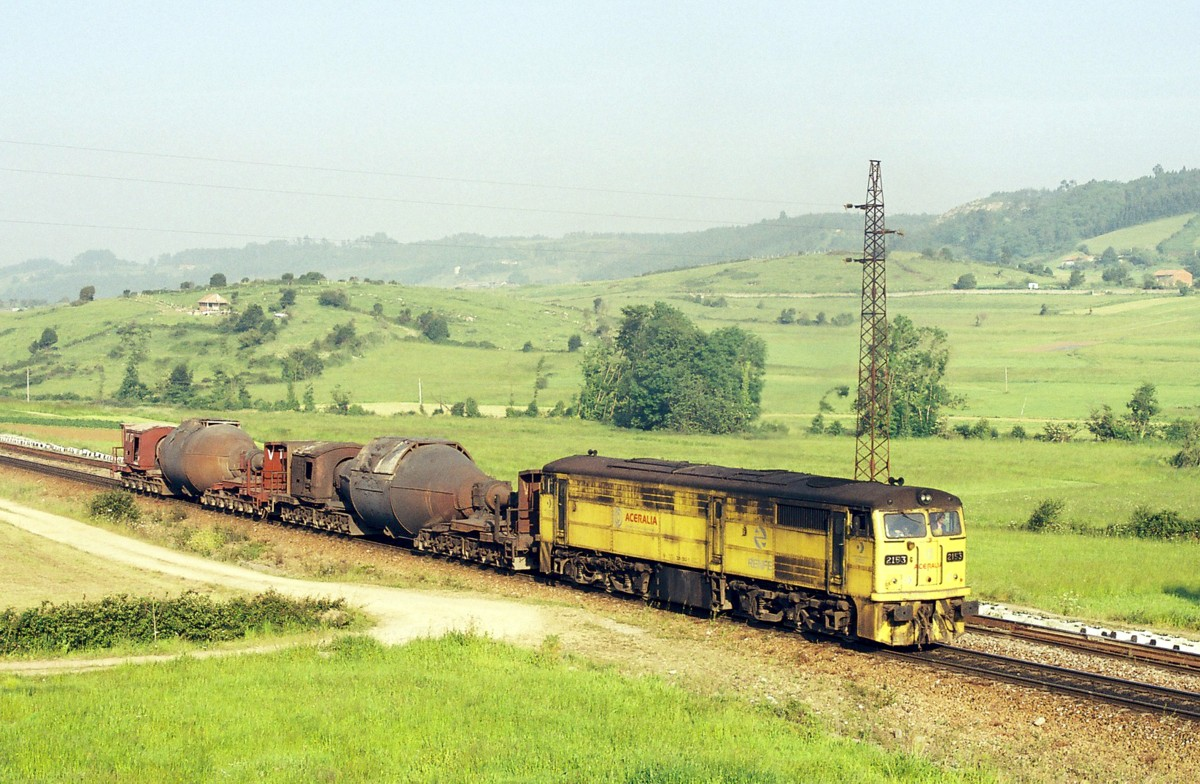
Aceralia torpedo train in El Valle, Asturias

In 1991 the state owned company ENSIDESA was merged with Altos Hornos de Vizcaya to form the Corporacion de la Siderurgia Integral from which the Corporación Siderúrgica Integral (CSI) was formed in 1994 from the more profitable parts (as part of a privatisation process).

In 1997 Aceralia Corporación Siderúrgica was formed by reorganisation of CSI, the same year the company formed a strategic alliance with the Luxembourg-based steel group Arbed. As soon as it was formed, it was also privatised. The group also acquired the Aristrain Group (steel sections), and Ucín (rebar, wire rod), in the process becoming the largest steel company in Spain.

In 2001 the company merged with two other European steel producers, ARBED and Usinor, to form Arcelor.

It became part of ArcelorMittal in 2006 with a plant in Avilés and Gijón, Etxebarri, Lesaka and Legasa, Sagunto and Sestao (part of Greater Bilbao), and is now known as ArcelorMittal Asturias.

As of 2010, the Veriña furnaces were supplied with coke from a plant in Avilés, whose eight production lines could then furnish 1.4 million tonnes per annum by train and by truck, one of which can carry 23,000 kilos.

In October 2020 the number of employees in the Asturian operation dropped below 5,000.

On 30 September 2022, management shut down one of two furnaces at the Veriña plant. The two were, at the time, the only two steel furnaces in the whole of Spain.

== See also ==
- List of steel producers
