= ARBED =

Luxembourg steel and iron company

Arbed S.A.
- Type: Public
- Industry: Steel
- Founded: 1911
- Defunct: Merged into Arcelor in 2002
- Headquarters: Luxembourg City, Luxembourg
- Products: Steel
- Website: Arbed.lu (2002 web archive)

The Aciéries Réunies de Burbach-Eich-Dudelange (French; literally "United Steelworks of Burbach-Eich-Dudelange"), better known by its acronym ARBED, was a major Luxembourg-based steel- and iron-producing company. Created in 1911 after the merger of three steel-producing companies, ARBED had a significant role in the economy of the Grand Duchy until it merged in 2002 with two other European steel companies to create Arcelor.

== History ==
=== Origins (1882–1911) ===
The discovery of iron ore in Luxembourg in the 1850s and the introduction of metallurgy in 1876 led to the development of an important national steel industry, especially in the south of the country, and provided Luxembourg with sustained economic growth during the second half of the 19th century. This economic growth was greatly boosted during the two decades preceding World War I when large integrated steelworks, able to convert cast iron into steel and rolled steel, were constructed. Steel production surged from 145 313 tonnes in 1900 to 1,115,004 tonnes in 1913, and steel-making accounted for around 60% of total industrial employment in Luxembourg before World War I. The close economic relationship between Luxembourg and its neighbours, especially Germany, enabled investors to develop cross-border projects. As early as 1856, Luxembourg industrialists and members of parliament founded the Saarbrücker Eisenhüttengesellschaft - Société en participation des Forges de Sarrebruck ("Saarbrücken Ironworks shareholding company"). Similarly, German industrialists invested funds in the development of Luxembourg steel companies.

South Luxembourg's important economic development due to steel production led to the creation of several steel-producing companies. In 1882, the Société Anonyme des Hauts Fourneaux et Forges de Dudelange ("High Furnace and Forging Mills of Dudelange Shareholding Company") was founded by the Société en commandite des Forges d'Eich, Le Gallais, Metz et Cie, founded in 1838, and the main shareholders of the Saarbrücken shareholding company.

As steel production increased exponentially, it soon became necessary to merge companies. In 1911, at an extraordinary general corporate meeting of the Société anonyme des Hauts Fourneaux et Forges de Dudelange, decision was taken to incorporate the Société anonyme des Mines du Luxembourg et Forges de Sarrebruck and the Société en commandite des Forges d'Eich, Le Gallais, Metz et Cie. into the Dudelange company. The new shareholding company, merging the three largest local steel companies, was named ARBED S.A., the acronym for Aciéries Réunies de Burbach-Eich-Dudelange, Société Anonyme.

=== Growth and Development of ARBED (1911–1945) ===
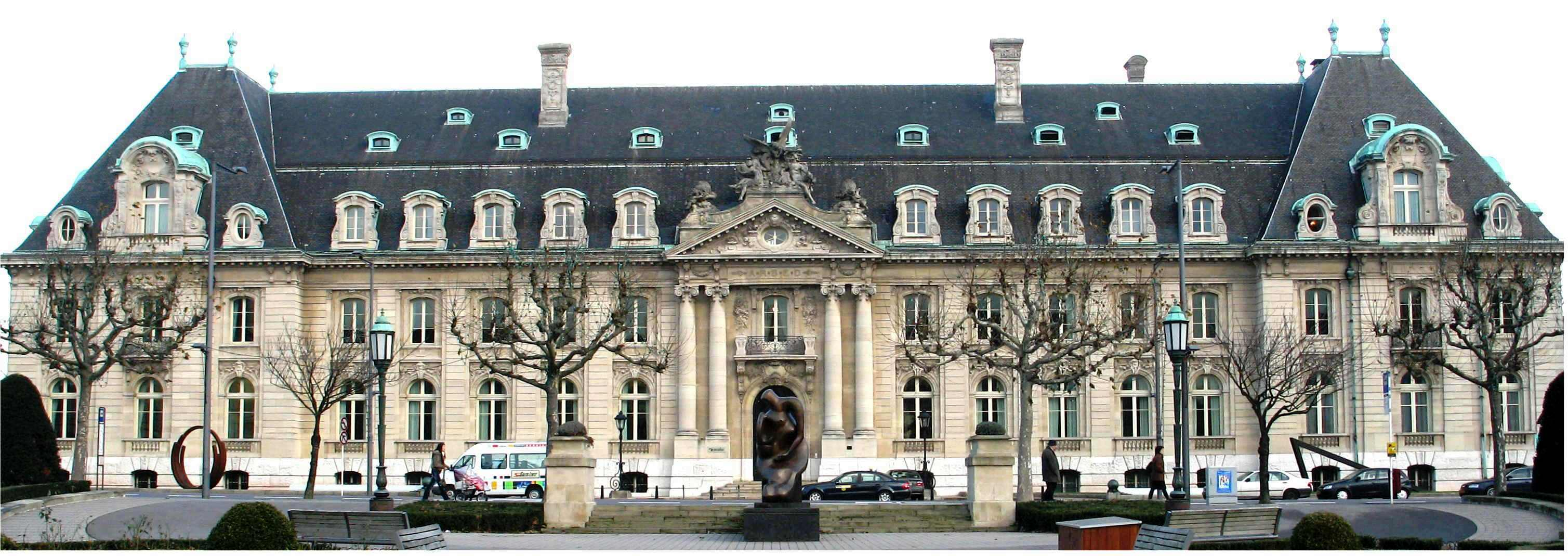
ARBED headquarters in Luxembourg City, built in 1922.

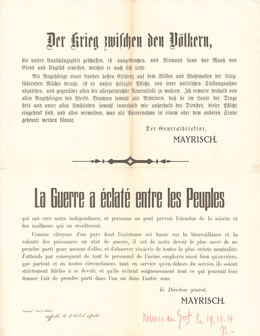
Mayrisch addressing the staff of his steel company ARBED on August 2nd, 1914

At its founding, ARBED operated 21 blast furnaces, 3 electric furnaces, 2 steelmaking plants and several rolling mills. In 1912, raw steel production from the ARBED works reached 824 500 tonnes. Although steel production almost halted during World War I, the following decades prove to be very successful. In order to further develop, ARBED took an international dimension and acquired and absorbed several companies in Belgium and Germany in the 1920s.

At the end of World War I, German capital was withdrawn, and steelworks were taken over by groups with Franco-Belgian-Luxembourg capital. Two companies, Société Metallurgique des Terres Rouges and Société Minière des Terres Rouges, were specifically created by ARBED and other French and Belgian companies for the purpose of acquiring plants and mines west of the Rhine which had to be sold by Germany as a consequence of the Treaty of Versailles.

ARBED, already a major regional steel producer, further developed its international reach by establishing with the Société Metallurgique des Terres Rouges company a joint sales company called COLUMETA in 1920, and a joint shipping company called TRANSAF in 1922. In order to develop its international reach, an ARBED offshoot called Companhia Siderúrgica Belgo-Mineira was established in Sabará, Minas Gerais, Brazil, in 1921. As ARBED's growth continued, ARBED and Société Metallurgique des Terres Rouges finally merged in 1937.

World War II severely affected steel production, and many steel mills were either destroyed or heavily damaged. Luxembourg had been officially absorbed into Germany, and ARBED was temporarily renamed Hüttenwerke Burbach-Eich-Dudelingen (Burbach-Eich-Dudelange Metallurgical Plants). The company group used several hundred forced laborers and prisoners of war from the Soviet Union, France, Belgium, Poland, and Italy with the forced labor camp at the sheet metal rolling mill in Burbach.

=== "Les Trente Glorieuses" (1946–1974) ===
During the three decades following the end of World War II, ARBED played a key role in the development of the Luxembourg economy. During this period, called Les Trente Glorieuses ("The Thirty Glorious"), national raw steel production rose from 2.45 million tonnes in 1950 to 6.45 million tonnes in 1974, and Luxembourg reached an exceptional annual growth rate of 6.7% between 1946 and 1951, then a good average of 3.9% until 1975. During the first half of the 1970s, the steel industry represented close to 30% of the total sum of added value in the national Luxembourg economy, and more than half the total added value of industry. By 1974, Luxembourg steelworks and iron mines provided work for around 25,000 employees in 1974 (16% of the total national).

During these three decades, ARBED not only developed its local plants but also increased the diversification of its activities. In 1962, ARBED became a partner in the creation of the maritime SIDMAR complex in Belgium, and later obtained a majority stake in the new company. In 1974, ARBED created TrefilARBED, as part of the extension of wire drawing activities, and Samarco, created through the mining company Samitri to develop iron ore resources in Brazil. A powerful regional European economic actor, ARBED gradually became a global actor through the magnitude of its operations.

=== World economic crisis and restructuring (1975–2002) ===
The 1973 oil crisis and its global repercussions had a dramatic impact on Luxembourg and on ARBED in particular, as it coincided with worldwide global steel overproduction. Despite ARBED's international sales network's restructuring in 1976 (Columeta was renamed TradeARBED) and the establishment of TrefilARBED Korea in 1978, by 1983, steel production had slumped back to 1955 levels (3.2 million tonnes, compared with 6.45 million tonnes in 1974). By 1985, the steel industry employed only half of its 1974-level work force.

In 1978 ARBED became a 25% shareholder in Métallurgique et Minière de Rodange-Athus (MMRA), mining and hot steel production were shut down and in 1994 MMRA merged with ARBED-Esch Schifflange (AES) to form Aciéries Rodange Esch-Schifflange (ARES) a subsidiary of ProfilARBED

From 1982 to 1983, the Luxembourg steel industry was restructured and the Luxembourg government invested heavily in ARBED, finally owning 42.9% of the company's shares. Furthermore, during the following two decades, ARBED developed its international activities as well as its production of long steel products (steel bars and rods produced for a variety of uses such as building and bridge construction) and electric arc furnace steel while reducing its domestic steel-producing operations.

Certain key events in the economic expansion of ARBED occurred in the 1990s. In 1990, ARBED jointly acquired Yates, a U.S. company specialising in the production of copper foil, with Japanese group Furukawa Electric. The following year, the Luxembourg company founded TrefilARBED Arkansas (USA), a steelcord plant in Pine Bluff, Arkansas. In 1992, it founded long steel products company Stahlwerk Thüringen in Germany. In 1993, ARBED founded ProfilARBED, a subsidiary company specialized in the production of long steel products and ARBED Americas, a subsidiary of TradeARBED, in 1994, to manage all United States commercial activities. ARBED also expanded by taking over other companies; in 1995, it obtained the majority of shares of German Klöckner Stahl, now Stahlwerke Bremen, and, in 1997, it developed a strategic partnership with Spanish steel company Aceralia (formerly CSI). However, during this period of geographic expansion and division of sectors, the remaining Luxembourg blast furnaces gradually stopped operating, the last one, in Belval, definitely halting its operations in 1997.

=== Arcelor and ArcelorMittal (2002 onwards) ===
Despite the end of its Luxembourg steel production, ARBED remained a global economic actor. Its diversification and development of its international scope enabled ARBED to remain competitive. In 2002, ARBED and two other European steel-producing and manufacturing companies, Spanish strategic partner Aceralia and French Usinor, merged into Arcelor.

In 2006 Mittal Steel launched a takeover for Arcelor that led to the creation of ArcelorMittal.

== See also ==
- List of steel producers
- Steel industry in Luxembourg
- Monique Scheier-Schneider, former company executive secretary

== External links and further reading ==
- ARBED (Archive)
- Paul Thomes; Marc Engels. "Eisen- und Stahlerzeugung im Luxemburger Minett". geo.uni.lu (in German). GR-Atlas. Archived from the original on 2011-07-22.
- Knebeler, Christophe (February 2011). "Wichtige technische Beiträge der ARBED zur Stahlherstellung" (PDF). Forum (in German) (304).
- Schoentgen, Marc (February 2011). ""Heim ins Reich"? Die ARBED-Konzernleitung während der deutschen Besatzung 1940-1944: zwischen Kollaboration und Widerstand" (PDF). Forum (in German) (304).
- Documents and clippings about ARBED in the 20th Century Press Archives of the ZBW
