= Usinor =

French steel manufacturer

- Industry: Steel
- Predecessor: Usinor-Sacilor (1986-1997); Usinor (1948-1986); Sacilor (1964-1986) others
- Defunct: 2002
- Successor: Arcelor

Usinor was a French steel making group formed in 1948. The group was merged with Sacilor in 1986, becoming Usinor-Sacilor and was privatised in 1995, and renamed Usinor in 1997.

In 2001 it merged with Arbed (Luxembourg) and Aceralia (Spain) to form the European company Arcelor, which became part of ArcelorMittal in 2006.

== History ==
=== Sacilor and predecessors ===
In 1704 Jean Martin de Wendel bought an ironworks in Hayange, Lorraine in north-eastern France. Over the next one hundred years industrial production grew, and, in 1822 the first coke fired blast furnace in France was constructed. Further growth occurred under de Wendel family ownership in the next century; in 1850 approximately 20,000 tons of iron and cast iron each were produced, by 1869 this had increased 15 blast furnaces and a production of well over 100,000 tons of cast iron and iron each. Production included rails, bars, sheet, tin and wire.

The company was split as a result of the Alsace-Lorraine region becoming part of Germany after that country's victory in the Franco-Prussian War in 1870. After Germany's defeat in the First World War the region returned to France, and the factories regained. Production continued to increase, with over 1.5million tons of iron and cast iron each produced in 1929.

The Great Depression in France affected the company's ability to invest and in 1948 nine steelmakers formed the Société Lorraine de Laminage Continu (Sollac), pooling their resources to modernise. Further consolidation took place in the 1950s and 60s; Sidélor was formed from the Rombas and Homécourt group of companies in 1950, in 1963 the Union des consommateurs de produits métallurgiques et industriels (UCPMI) and Knutange merged to form the Société Mosellane de Sidérurgie (SMS).

Sacilor (Société des Aciéries et Laminoirs de Lorraine) was first created in 1964 as a joint venture between the de Wendel and Sidélor groups (France for the construction of a modern steel plant in Gandrange, Lorraine. The groups themselves merged with SMS in 1967, forming de Wendel-Sidélor; in 1968 this group produced 40% of French production: 20million tons of Iron.

The entire group became named Sacilor in 1973.

=== Usinor and predecessors ===
Usinor (Union Sidérurgique du Nord) was created in 1948 from the merger of Denain-Anzin (Les Hauts Fourneaux, Forges et Aciéries de Denain-Anzin) founded 1849 and Nord-Est (Les Forges et Aciéries du Nord et de l'Est) founded 1882. Both companies had their origins in ironworks founded in the first half of the 19th century in the modern day département of Nord.

The company was formed for the consolidation of the steel works in the region, with a new plant in Denain, opened in 1952. Another factory, dedicated to steel sheet production, was opened in Dunkirk in 1971, receiving materials by sea and from abroad.

In 1963 merger with Lorraine-Escaut, also formed from the merger of older companies. (Senelle-Maubeuge, Longwy and Escaut et Meuse). The financial crisis of the 1970s affected the company negatively, and state investment grew. In 1979 another merger took place between Usinor and the smaller Chiers-Chatillon-Neuves Maisons. By 1981 90% of Usinor's shares were state owned.

=== Nationalisation and merger of Usinor and Sacilor ===
The economic effects of the 1973 oil crisis affected both the steelmaking groups, already in debt from modernisation projects, and heavily reliant on state loans; in 1981 both Usinor and Sacilor was nationalised.

Following another steel market crash in 1983, and the halt to subsidies to the steel industry brought in by the European Commission in 1986; Both companies were making heavy losses; in September 1986 the merger of Usinor and Sacilor was announced forming Usinor-Sacilor.

=== Usinor-Sacilor, Usinor, and merger into Arcelor ===
Further companies were absorbed into the group, Sollac in 1990, Ugine in 1991. In 1995 the company was privatised, and in 1997 the entire group renamed Usinor.

In 1998 Cockerill-Sambre, a Belgian steelmaker was acquired.

Usinor restructured as primarily a flat carbon steel producer in the last years of the 20th century, and disposed of several speciality steel product and long steel product businesses: the Usinor/Cockerill owned rolling mill manufacturer Forcast was sold to Akers (company) in 1998; in 1998-9 the subsidiary: Unimetal (long products) and its subsidiaries Trefileurope, and Societe Metallurgique de Revigny (SMR) were sold to Ispat International (later Mitall Steel Company) for approximately $107 million (693 million francs); railway wheelset and axle manufacturing subsidiaries Valdunes and RTM were sold to Freedom Forge Holding (Standard Steel, USA) in 1998; railway rail manufacturing subsidiary Sogerail (Hayange, France) was sold to British Steel plc in 1999. the special long products and forged products subsidiary Ascometal was sold to Lucchini S.p.A. in 1999; and the electrical steel subsidiary UGO (Usinor Grains Orientés SA) was sold to Thyssen Krupp in 2000.

In 2001/2 the group merged with Arbed of Luxembourg and Aceralia of Spain to form Arcelor.
