= Arcelor =

2002–2006 European steel producer

Arcelor S.A.
- Company type: Société Anonyme
- Industry: Steel
- Predecessors: Arbed (1911); Aceralia (1902); Usinor (1948)
- Founded: February 18, 2002; 24 years ago
- Defunct: 2006
- Fate: Merged with Mittal Steel
- Successor: ArcelorMittal (2006)
- Headquarters: Luxembourg City, Luxembourg
- Products: Steel
- Revenue: €40.6 billion (2006)
- Number of employees: 103,935 (2006)
- Website: www.arcelor.com

Arcelor S.A. was the world's largest steel producer in terms of turnover and the second largest in terms of steel output, with a turnover of €30.2 billion and shipments of 45 million metric tons of steel in 2004. The company was created in 2002 by a merger of the former companies Aceralia (Spain), Usinor (France) and Arbed (Luxembourg). Arcelor is now part of ArcelorMittal after a takeover by Mittal Steel in 2006.

== Business ==
Once employing 310,000 employees in over 60 countries, it was a major player in all its main markets: automotive, construction, metal processing, primary transformation, household appliances, and packaging, as well as general industry. With total sales of over €40 billion, Arcelor was, by 2006, one of the world's largest steel manufacturer in terms of turnover.

It produced long steel products, flat steel products and inox-steel.

In January 2006 Arcelor announced the acquisition of Dofasco, Canada's largest steel producer with an annual output of 4.4 million tons. After an intense bidding war against the German ThyssenKrupp, Arcelor had finally bid 5.6 billion Canadian dollars.

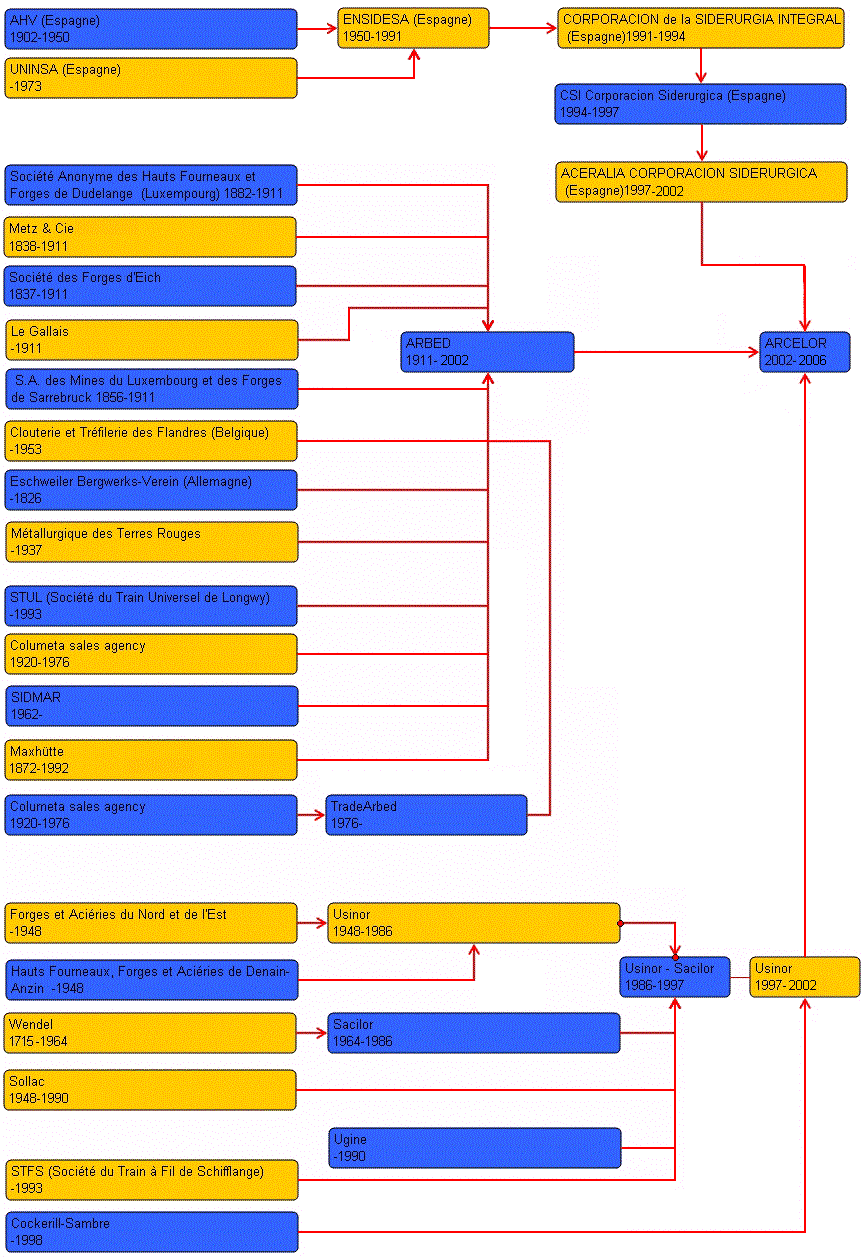
arcelor

== Merger with Mittal Steel ==
The company was the target of a hostile takeover bid by its rival Mittal Steel on 27 January 2006. However, the bid resulted in substantial increase in Arcelor's share value. Two members of the board of Arcelor, Guillermo Ulacia and Jacques Chabanier also resigned suddenly. On 26 May 2006 Arcelor announced its intention to merge with Severstal. There were questions about the intentions of Arcelor in announcing its merger with Severstal due to a perceived opacity in the transaction. But on 25 June 2006, the Arcelor board decided to go ahead with the merger with Mittal Steel. Arcelor compensated Severstal €140 million for the failed merger attempt. Lakshmi Mittal became the president and Arcelor chairman Joseph Kinsch was appointed chairman of the new company until his retirement. Arcelor's merger with Mittal created the worldwide leader in the steel industry, increasing its bargaining power with suppliers and consumers. Mittal Steel agreed to pay €40.37 a share to Arcelor, doubling its original offer.

=== Reaction to the takeover ===
Arcelor's directors strongly opposed the takeover, as did the governments of France, Luxembourg and Spain. The Belgian government, on the other hand, declared its stance as neutral and invited both parties to deliver a business plan with the future investments in research in the Belgian steel plants. The French opposition was initially very fierce and has been criticized in the Indian media as double standards and economic nationalism in Europe. Indian commerce minister Kamal Nath warned that any attempt by France to block the deal would lead to a trade war between India and France.

On 20 June, the above claim by economists was confirmed when Severstal increased its valuation of Arcelor. Management of Arcelor had in fact undervalued the company itself. The capability of management which had openly supported the previous valuation of Arcelor came into question. Further the combined markets of France, Belgium, Luxembourg and Spain chided Arcelor management and suspended trading of its stock.

On 26 June, the Board of Directors recommended the approval of the improved Mittal offer (49% improvement compared to the initial offer with 108% improvement of the cash component), proposed the creation of Arcelor-Mittal with industrial and corporate governance model based on Arcelor and scheduled a corporate meeting for 30 June to vote on this.

== Products ==
The products of Arcelor are divided into three groups: Flat steel products, long steel products and stainless steel.

=== Flat steel products ===
The main production sites of flat steel products are Ghent, Dunkirk, Avilés, Gijón, Fos-sur-Mer, Piombino, Liège, Florange, Bremen, Eisenhüttenstadt and recently São Francisco do Sul in Brazil.

== See also ==
- ArcelorMittal
- List of steel producers
- Mittal Steel Company
