= Steel industry in Luxembourg =

Overview of the steel industry of Luxembourg

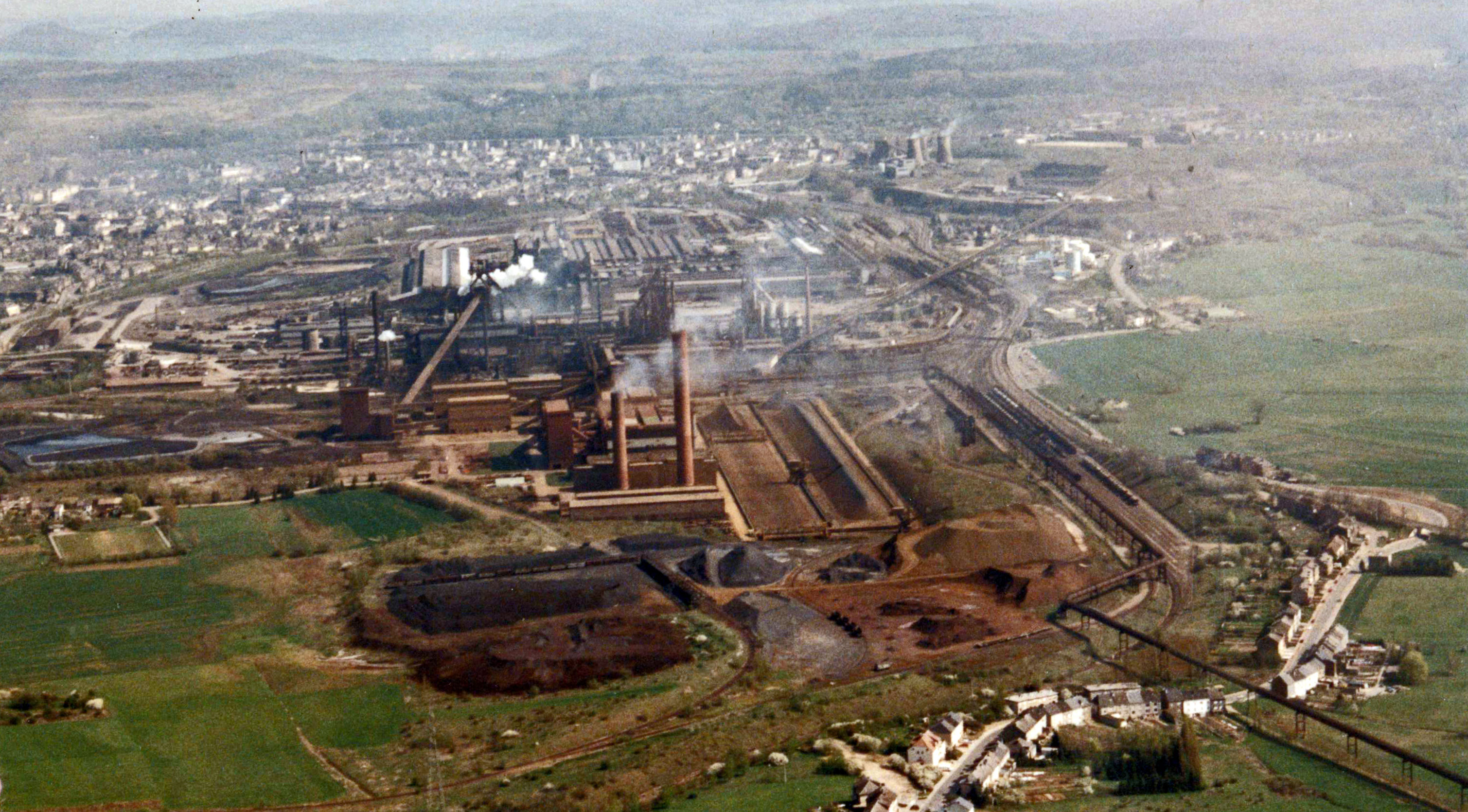
The Esch-Belval site of ARBED, in 1991

In the industrial sector, the Luxembourg steel industry continues to occupy the first place in the country, even after the industrial reforms which have taken place since the 1960s.

== History ==
=== Early development ===
Iron was already worked and processed by the Celts in the region of modern-day Luxembourg. Archeological remains of this have been found on the Gläicht between Esch-Alzette and Rumelange. In 2003–2005, the remains of a smelting plant from the 13th or 14th century were found and excavated in the Genoeserbusch near Peppange.

In the pre-industrial period (17th-18th centuries), there were a number of furnaces throughout the country, located near rivers (for water power) or forests (where charcoal was produced). "Bohnerz" ("bean ore") was used. The furnaces only employed a small number of permanent, specialised workers, estimated at 700 in the late 18th century. This early industry involved another 8,000-10,000 workers on a seasonal basis: road workers, carriers, lumberjacks, colliers. These were generally farmers temporarily freed up from agricultural work, and earning some extra money. Luxembourgish steel industry generally produced iron bars, wrought iron and cast iron. Due to the weak domestic market, most of this was exported to workshops in Liège, which used the iron in their manufactured products which were exported from Dutch ports.

=== 19th century ===
In 1841/1842, there were 11 blast furnaces in Luxembourg, which all used wood and whose total annual production amounted to 7,300 tons. The blast furnaces were in the following villages:

| Locality | Number of blast furnaces | Annual production in tons |
|---|---|---|
| Berbourg | 1 | 700 |
| Lamadelaine | 2 | 900 |
| Bissen | 2 | 1400 |
| Colmar-Berg | 1 | 700 |
| Fischbach | 2 | 1500 |
| Grundhof | 1 | 700 |
| Ansembourg | 1 | 700 |
| Dommeldange | 1 | 700 |

Luxembourg's steel industry changed radically in the mid-19th century. In 1842, Luxembourg joined the Zollverein (the German customs union), gaining access to a large market in the East. The treaty to join the Zollverein was regularly renewed over the next 60 years, and facilitated the country's industrial development. Profiting from the economic dynamism of its German neighbours, Luxembourg started exporting its iron ore to the Saar and Ruhr areas, but also to Belgian forges. A deposit of minette, a low-quality Luxembourgish iron ore, had been discovered in the south of the country in 1842.

In addition to the opening of the German market, the expansion of the railway network from 1855 to 1875 was another important factor, particularly the construction of the Luxembourg-Thionville railway line, with connections from there to the European industrial regions. As a consequence, it became profitable to use the harder coke instead of charcoal.

This meant that the furnace owners were more and more interested in using minette. From 1854 to 1869, there were 64 requests for a concession to mine minette, mostly from Belgian and Prussian companies. About two-thirds of the mined minette was exported to the Prussian Rhineland and to Belgium.

From the 1870s, the influx of German capital, the exploitation of the mines of the Esch-Alzette area in the south of the country, the use of the Gilchrist–Thomas process in steel-making after 1879, and a high level of immigration—Germans after 1870, Italians after 1890—contributed to make Luxembourg's steel industry one of the most important in Europe. Five large steel companies were founded from 1870 to 1890:

- Société des hauts-fourneaux luxembourgeois (1870)
- Société des hauts-fourneaux de Rodange (1872)
- Société des hauts-fourneaux de Hollerich (1877)
- Société des hauts-fourneaux de Rumelange (1880)
- Société des hauts-fourneaux et forges de Dudelange (1882)

Under a law passed in 1870, the state became the owner of all minette reserves down to a certain depth. In 1880, another law was passed, which tied new concessions to mine minette under the condition that it had to be processed in Luxembourg. This enabled certain Luxembourg families to play a key role in the furnaces.

==== Steel industry families ====
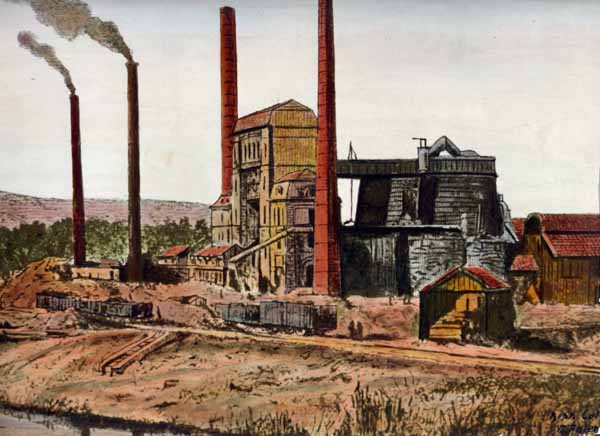
The Metz foundry in the 1870s, which later became ARBED Esch-Schifflange

The brothers Charles, Norbert and Auguste Metz founded the "Société en commandite Auguste Metz & Cie" in 1838, with the help of Belgian investments holding group "Société d'industrie luxembourgeoise". They rented the foundry of Berbourg from Jean-Nicolas Collart and in 1845 built the Eich foundry. In 1847 they bought their investors' shares, and from then on ran the company "Metz & Cie" as a family business. From 1866 to 1868, the Metz brothers built a modern steel mill in Dommeldange, with four blast furnaces, which processed coke and minette.

In 1870, Norbert Metz associated his company with the SA des Mines du Luxembourg et des Forges de Saarbruck, which was run by Victor Tesch. In 1871 they received permission to open a foundry in Esch-sur-Alzette, which was later renamed ARBED-Schifflange. This steel mill first produced cast iron, which was processed in Burbach, at Burbach Foundry. At the same time the Brasseur foundry (later "ARBED Terres Rouges") was founded in Esch, by the brothers Dominique-Alexis and Pierre Brasseur. The following year, the Steinfort foundry owners Charles and Jules Collart set up a foundry in Rodange, with other investors. The same year, the SA Gonner, Munier et Helson built blast furnaces in Rumelange.

In the 1880s, there was a further change: the Metz brothers acquired the rights to the process invented in 1879 by Sidney Thomas and Percy Gilchrist, allowing cast iron to be made into steel. They first used this process in Eich, but soon after opened a new foundry in Dudelange, which used the new procedure exclusively. To run this plant, they partnered up with Victor Tesch and the Count de Bertier, who owned a large amount of land in Dudelange, and founded the "Société anonyme des Hauts-fourneaux et Forges de Dudelange".

=== Turn of the century: German influence and vertical integration ===
From the late 19th century to World War I, the Luxembourg steel industry depended entirely on Germany. 90% of the coke used in Luxembourg was imported from the Ruhr, and up to 70% of its produce was sold to Germany. The machinery and technology came from Germany, as did the skilled personnel and the engineers. The decision-making centre was in the Ruhr, whereas Luxembourg was a kind of periphery, where raw materials and semi-finished goods were made, to be processed in the Ruhr.

After the German annexation of Lorraine in 1871, Luxembourgish steel products were subject to intense competition. Germany's suppression of customs rights in 1873 and overproduction provoked an economic downturn amplified by the arrival of British cast iron. The re-establishment of customs rights in 1879 put an end to this crisis. From then onwards, cartels were formed with a view to regulating the steel market. In 1879, a Lorraine-Luxembourgish iron cartel (Lothringisch-Luxemburgisches Roheisensyndikat) was formed, and in 1889 a steel cartel, the Lothringisch-Luxemburgischer Stahlwerksverband.

Around the turn of the century, Luxembourg's steel industry became more vertically integrated. The exploitation of minette, iron extraction, steel production and the process of rolling the steel were organised close to each other. The companies banded together in bigger and bigger conglomerates:

- In 1911, under the leadership of Émile Mayrisch, the Metz and Tesch families amalgamated their companies to form ARBED, the "SA des Aciéries Réunies de Burbach-Eich-Dudelange".
- The Gelsenkirchener Bergwerks-AG, the second-largest German heavy industry group after Krupp, bought the Brasseur foundry (renamed Rothe Erde) and its mines, and founded the Adolf-Emil-Hütte from 1909 to 1913 in Esch-Belval.
- The Deutsch-Luxemburgische Bergwerks- und Hütten-AG bought and modernised the Société anonyme des hauts-fourneaux de Differdange, which had been founded in 1896 by Paul Wurth and Baron Alexandre de Gerlache. It did the same with the foundry at Rumelange.
- The Belgian SA d'Ougrée-Marihaye took over the Rodange foundry in 1905, and added a steelworks and rolling mill,
- The cable producer Felten & Guilleaume, a subsidiary of the German AEG, took over the Steinfort foundry in 1912.

The production statistics make it clear how much the Luxembourg steel industry had changed within only 35 years. The volume of minette mined increased tenfold from 700,000 tons in 1868 to 7 million tons in 1913; the volume of cast iron produced increased from 100,000 tons to 2,5 million, and steel production, started only in 1886, reached 1,5 million tons in 1913. The number of blast furnaces increased from 14 in 1871 to 47 in 1913.

Just before World War I, Luxembourg was the sixth-largest cast iron producer worldwide, and the eighth-largest producer of steel.

== World War I and inter-war period ==
During World War I, industrial production continued in Luxembourg, now under German occupation.

The social crisis brought about by the war caused the workers in the metallurgy industry to found trade unions: the politically neutral Luxemburger Berg- und Hüttenarbeiter-Verband was founded on 1 September 1916, and the socialist Metallarbeiterverband was created on 3 September.

Yet the big break for the industry came later: as a consequence of the German defeat, Luxembourg had to withdraw from the Zollverein in 1919. The steel industry, amongst others, advocated a trade alliance with the French, but it was not to be. Instead, after tough negotiations, Luxembourg found a new economic and trade partner in Belgium, with whom it formed the Belgium–Luxembourg Economic Union in 1921.

The post-war return of Lorraine — hitherto part of Germany — to France meant that the vast Lorraine-Luxembourg-Saar industrial complex was broken up.

The break with Germany meant that the Luxembourg steel industry not only had to reorient itself economically, but also had to restructure itself. The challenge was twofold: firstly, to secure both pre- and post-production markets (that is, on the one hand, the supply of raw materials, minette and coke, and on the other, a demand for the finished products, from nails to grey-beams); secondly, to take the place of the German firms, which had had to withdraw.

In 1919, the German companies in Luxembourg were sold:

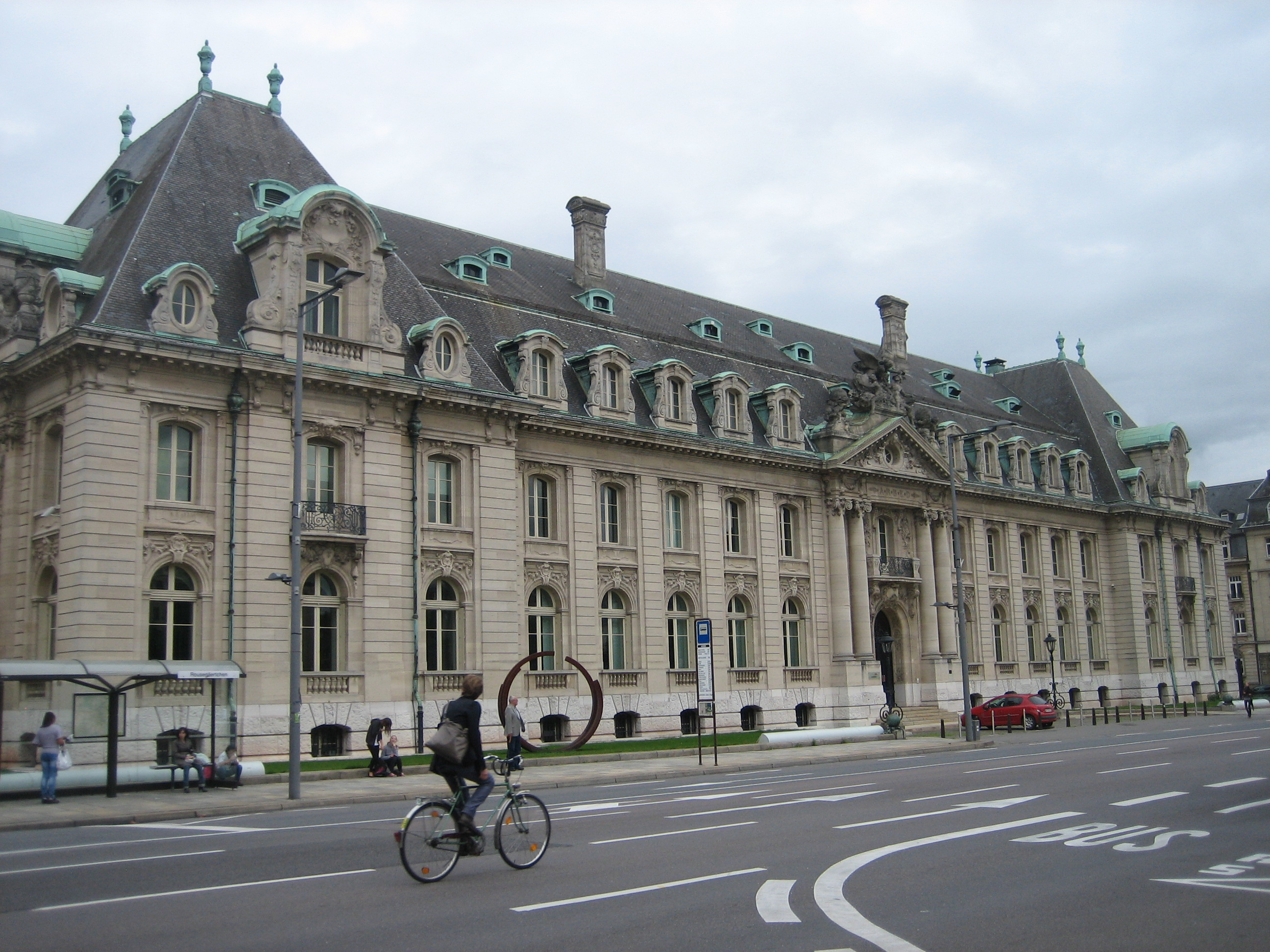
The ARBED building on the Avenue de la Liberté in Luxembourg City

- A Franco-Belgo-Luxembourg consortium, the "Société Métallurgique des Terres Rouges", with Schneider-Creusot, ARBED and the Banque de Bruxelles as the main investors, bought the sites of the "Gelsenkirchener Bergwerks-AG" (including the foundries "Rothe Erde" and the "Adolf-Emil-Hütte" in Esch);
- ARBED, together with Terres Rouges, took over coal mines around Cologne, and in Belgium and the Netherlands in 1920. It also purchased concessions and land in Lorraine. In downstream production, it took over the Cologne "Felten & Guilleaume" (1919) and the "Clouterie et Tréfilerie de Flandres" (1921).
- A Franco-Belgian consortium, HADIR ("Hauts-fourneaux et aciéries de Differdange, St-Ingbert, Rumelange"), was founded by the Société générale de Belgique and the Société Lorraine des Aciers de Rombas and took over the sites of the "Deutsch-Luxemburgische Bergwerks- und Hütten-AG", which included the foundries of Differdange and Rumelange, and the mines of Ottange.
- The foundry of Steinfort went from "Felten & Guilleaume" to "Athus-Grivégnée". They also took shares in various coal and ore mines.
- Schneider took over the German parts of "Ougrée-Marihaye", including the foundry of Rodange, via a subsidiary.

The German market had collapsed; the Belgian market was saturated by Belgian production; the French market was closed off due to customs; this meant that the Luxembourg foundry owners had to find new markets elsewhere in Europe, in America and Asia. They quickly founded trading posts, to export their products worldwide. In 1920, ARBED founded Columeta (Comptoir Luxembourgeois de Métallurgie, later renamed Trade Arbed), and HADIR followed suit in 1923, by joining SOGECO (Société Générale pour le Commerce de Produits Industriels). Columeta had branches in Brazil, Argentina, India and Japan. New markets for the steel industry were found in Britain, Italy, Austria and the Netherlands. In 1923–1925, sold 72-75% of its production in Europe; Belgium (20%) and Germany (11%) were the major clients. America and Asia each absorbed about 12%. Unlike the situation under the Zollverein, the external markets had become highly volatile. The German market, essential to Luxembourg's economy, had been kept open until 1925 by provisional measures of the Treaty of Versailles. However, this concession was effectively cancelled out by the massive inflation in Germany in 1922–1923.

The Luxembourg steel industry managed to transform itself in a short period of time from a supplier of German steel companies into an independent producer of diverse finished goods, which were competitive on the world market. In summary, one can say that the basis for Luxembourg steel production, as it was to remain until the 1970s, was laid at the end of World War I.

The steel war between France and Germany, of which the occupation of the Ruhr area was a part, was highly damaging to Luxembourg. The head of ARBED, Émile Mayrisch, sought to bring about a Franco-German rapprochement. His knowledge of both countries and their languages, and many contacts in the business world, allowed him to play the role of an honest broker. In September 1926 he managed to hammer out an agreement on the International Steel Agreement. This functioned as a cartel, and put an end to the steel war. Five large steel producers limited their production through a quota system: 40,5% for Germany; 31,9% for France; 12,6% for Belgium; 6,6% for the Saar region; 8,5% for Luxembourg. In 1926, Luxembourg again reached its 1913 level of production (2,560,000 tonnes of cast iron), and surpassed it in 1929 with 2,906,000 tonnes.

The following years of the inter-war period, in contrast to the early boom years, were characterised by a level of stagnation, and several crises. The foundry of Rumelange closed down in 1927, as did that of Steinfort in 1931. There were further technological breakthroughs, but none as revolutionary as the Gilchrist-Thomas process.

Production in the 1930s was subject to large fluctuations. Luxembourg did not escape the consequences of the Great Depression, which hit the country with some delay. Production stood at 2,512,000 tonnes in 1937 and 1,551,000 tonnes in 1938.

There had traditionally been a high number of foreigners working in the steel industry in Luxembourg, making up 60% of the work force in 1913. This proportion had declined in World War I; however, it then increased from a level of 25% in 1922 to 40% in 1930. The 1920s, then, showed that although World War I constituted a break, heavy industry was still dependent on foreign labour. During the economic crisis after 1929, employers tended to lay off foreign workers first, meaning that by 1939 their proportion of the steel workforce had sunk to 20%.

With the sale of German companies after World War I, the proportion of Luxembourgish managers in the steel industry also increased. ARBED traditionally favoured them, while Hadir preferred to have Frenchmen in positions of management.

== World War II ==
After Luxembourg had been invaded in May 1940 and occupied by German troops, a German civil administration headed by Gauleiter Gustav Simon was established in July 1940. It had two main goals: to turn the Luxembourgers' minds towards Deutschtum, and to bring the steel industry under German control.

Immediately after the occupation, two high-level functionaries were sent to the country. These were Otto Steinbrinck, "Commissioner-General for the Belgo-Luxembourg Iron-Producing Industry" and Paul Raabe, "Commissioner-General for Iron Ore Exploitation and Distribution for Lorraine and Luxembourg". In June 1940, Steinbrinck called together the Luxembourg heads of industry, to make them pledge to cooperate with the Germans. Anyone refusing to do so would have to resign. The representatives of ARBED and the Rodange foundry agreed to the conditions, while those of Hadir refused. Thereupon, on 15 June the Hadir foundries were incorporated into a new body, the Differdinger Stahlwerke AG. The Rodange foundry, owned by "Ougrée-Marihaye", was allowed to continue its existence; it received a German trustee as its head, and was renamed the "Eisenhüttenwerke Rodingen".

Several German steel companies, including the Reichswerke Hermann Göring, were eager to take over ARBED. Gustav Simon would not allow this: he recognised the key role that ARBED played in Luxembourg, and was reluctant to lose control over it. ARBED's management was not changed - Aloyse Meyer remained managing director - due to fears that this would affect its productivity. However, a delegate was sent from Germany to oversee Meyer's work; the share ownership of ARBED, which had mostly belonged to the Société générale de Belgique, was much changed; and the executive board included nine Germans and six Luxembourgers (compared to the pre-war 15 Luxembourgers and two Belgians). It was, however, intended from the outset that when Germany had won the war, ARBED and the Rodange foundry would also pass into German ownership.

=== Wartime production ===
Concerning the production levels in wartime, there are two periods to be distinguished: From August 1940 to March 1942, production was lower than before the war, due to the collapse of the French export market, the need to retool towards the German market, and the lack of raw materials. In August 1940, there were 14,000 unemployed. But from April 1942 until the liberation, the war industry's demands grew and grew. There were now not enough workers to meet demand. Another reason was that from September 1942, 1,200 foundry workers were forcibly conscripted into the Wehrmacht. Thus, from Autumn 1942 onwards, hundreds of so-called Ostarbeiter were taken from the occupied territories of Eastern Europe to Luxembourg and forced to work in the foundries and mines. They were not qualified to work in the foundries, and therefore production levels never reached those of the inter-war period.

Other prisoners were also forced to work in the foundries: at Arbed-Schifflange, prisoners from the external camp of the Natzweiler-Struthof concentration camp at Audun-le-Tiche were used.

== European integration and post-war boom ==
Due to the national importance of each country's steel sector, there was a grave risk of overproduction. For this reason, it was necessary to create a supranational body capable of coordinating European steel production. The French foreign minister, Robert Schuman, proposed the creation of a European Coal and Steel Community in 1950: soon, Germany, Belgium, Italy, the Netherlands and Luxembourg agreed to the "Schuman Plan". For Luxembourg, the stakes were high, as steel was vital to its economy. The Schuman Plan would allow it to export its products to Germany and France, and grant it free access to the raw materials it required. At the same time, there was some nervousness at transferring sovereign rights to a supranational institution: it would mean transferring control over a central part of the national economy to a common body. Trade union leaders feared the move would mean lower pay for Luxembourgish workers, while managers feared that subsidies to Belgian coal producers would mean an imbalance in prices between Belgium and Luxembourg.

The Benelux countries each received one seat in the High Authority, and Luxembourg was allocated 4 out of 78 seats in the Common Assembly.

The period from World War II to 1974, known as the Trente Glorieuses, was characterised by stable growth. In 1958, 25,700 people were employed in the Luxembourg steel industry, rising to 27,200 in 1974. Steel production rose from 3 million tons in 1951, to 4 million in 1960, to 6,4 million in 1974.

Between 1946 and 1967, 30,2 billion francs were invested in the factories. In Belval, the blast furnaces A (1965) and B (1970) started production.

A new process, the so-called LD-AC process, allowed steel quality to be improved.

ARBED managed to reinforce its position, and in 1967 it took over Hadir, thereby becoming a monopoly producer in Luxembourg steel production and processing. Around the same time, it became the majority owner of the Sidmar factory in Ghent, one of the most modern steelworks in Europe, with direct access to the sea.

== Steel crisis and re-orientation ==
In 1974 the world steel market collapsed due to over-production. The reasons for this were the oil crisis of 1973, which increased energy prices and caused demand to decrease; competition from Asia, which was growing bigger and bigger; and European steel companies owned by the state, which to some extent brought their products to market at dumping prices.

In one year, from 1974 to 1975, sales from Luxembourg fell from 6.4 million tons to 4.6 million tons. It soon became clear that this was not a short-term incident, but a structural steel crisis.

ARBED faced the challenge of modernising itself as quickly as possible to become profitable again with declining sales and income.

=== Luxembourg's social model ===
In 1975 a law was enacted that prevented lay-offs for economic reasons. On 18 August 1975 a Tripartite economic committee was created, that is, a committee involving representatives of employers, trade unions and the government. Its goal was to manage the disappearance of thousands of jobs in steel-working as well as possible. In 1977, a Division Anti-Crise, or DAC, was created, where those who had lost their jobs in steel-working could do community work (2,700 people in 1977). Obligatory early retirement at 57 years was introduced for ARBED employees; as well as cash subsidies for those who left voluntarily.

In March 1979, a Tripartite agreement was reached, stipulating that ARBED would invest 23.2 billion francs by 1983 to modernise its factories. The unions accepted that worker numbers would be reduced to 16,500, and the Luxembourg government granted ARBED a loan of 3.2 billion francs, over 10 years. The production facilities that were not profitable and not worth modernising, were closed.

Additionally, synergy agreements were made with other steel producers: instead of everyone doing everything across the whole range of products, only the most profitable site for each would remain in existence. Thus, the Steckel mill at Dudelange was closed.

1979 showed that these measures would not be enough: the steel crisis intensified, through increased inflation, which increased interest levels on loans, the second oil crisis, which caused energy and raw material prices to shoot up, and over-production, which was still a factor in different steel-producing countries, despite the Davignon Plan.

ARBED had received relatively little government money at this point, compared to its competitors: from 1976 to 1982 it invested 25.8 billion francs, of which only 10% were from the state. The DAC cost 5.1 billion in the same period, of which the state covered 1.6 billion. In other areas, where people were simply made redundant, these costs did not exist. From 1975 to 1979, a ton of steel was supported with 13 francs in Luxembourg, 700-900 francs in France, 1,500 francs in the UK, and with 1,800 francs in Belgium.

Thus, the Tripartite agreement was changed in 1979, and on 8 April 1982 a law created the "national investment contribution" (Contribution nationale d'investissement), also called the "solidarity tax", which was levied by general taxation.

=== Improving prospects ===
In 1984, a law was enacted through which the state of Luxembourg became an investor in ARBED and took over all the shares of Sidmar. To finance this, the solidarity tax was raised from 5% to 10%.

After further investments in ARBED, in 1986 the Luxembourg government was the largest investor with 43.9% of shares. However, the state only had 30.8% of voting rights.

In the 1990s, prospects improved. The individual companies of the ARBED group were structured as autonomous units, which were each responsible for showing good results. In 1992, ARBED bought up the Maxhütte Unterwellendorf, and through Sidmar, bought the majority of Klöckner Stahl in Bremen. It increased its share of the capital of Belgo-Mineira to become the main investor. The Métallurgique et Minière de Rodange-Athus, of which ARBED had owned 25% since 1978, passed completely into its ownership in 1994.

In 1994, ARBED took the strategic decision to use only electric production. The time of the blast furnace, using ore and coke, was over. Over the next few years, all steelworks in Luxembourg were converted to use electric arc furnaces, in which scrap iron was melted using electricity. The last blast furnace in Luxembourg, HF B in Belval, was closed in July 1997.

== Arcelor and Mittal Steel ==
On 18 February 2002, Arbed merged with the Spanish company Aceralia, of which it had owned 35% since 1997, and the French Usinor. The new group, headquartered in Luxembourg, took the name Arcelor. It became the largest steel company in the world.

Mittal Steel announced a takeover bid for Arcelor in January 2006. After long discussions, on 25 June 2006 Arcelor agreed to merge with the Anglo-Dutch group Lakshmi Mittal.

The new group, formed from the two largest steel producers in the world, took the name ArcelorMittal. Its headquarters initially remained in the Avenue de la Liberté in Luxembourg. The first factory worldwide to receive the name ArcelorMittal, was ArcelorMittal Dudelange. The group made about 6% of the world's steel in 2016.

== See also ==
- Economy of Luxembourg
- Mining in Luxembourg
- Émile Mayrisch
- History of the steel industry (1850–1970)
- History of the steel industry (1970–present)

== Bibliography and further reading ==
- Casali, Simone (12 March 2013). L’industrie sidérurgique luxembourgeoise depuis les années 60. Le Luxembourg 1960-2010 (in French). STATEC - Institut national de la statistique et des études économiques.
- Hamdi, Mohamed (5 January 2018). "L'industrie lourde luxembourgeoise dans l'armement allemand". d'Lëtzebuerger Land. p. 11.
- Hemmer, Carlo. L'économie du Grand-Duché de Luxembourg - La production secondaire: L'industrie sidérurgique. Luxembourg: Editions Joseph Beffort, 1953.
- Kreins, Jean-Marie (2010). Histoire du Luxembourg (5th ed.). Paris: Presses Universitaires de France.
- Krier, Émile (1989). "La sidérurgie au Luxembourg pendant la Seconde Guerre mondiale". Les cahiers lorrains: 59–68.
- Leboutte, René; Puissant, Jean; Scuto, Denis (1998). Un siècle d'histoire industrielle (1873-1973) - Belgique, Luxembourg, Pays-Bas. Industrialisation et Sociétés. SEDES.
- Maas, Jacques (1 April 1994). "August Thyssen und die luxemburgische Minenkonzessionsaffäre von 1912". Hémecht (in German). 46 (2).
- Maas, Jacques (2021). "L'usine sidérurgique de Dommeldange, une forge pionnière aux portes de la ville de Luxembourg" (PDF). ons stad (in French) (123): 45–50.
- Raggi, Paul (2019). "Deux territoires sidérurgiques en reconversion: la Lorraine au miroir du Luxembourg". 20 & 21. Revue d'histoire (in French) (144): 161–174. doi:10.3917/vin.144.0161.
- Schmit, Lambert (2006). "Richesses d'une région, émois d'une nation. Sur les traces de la sidérurgie dans le bassin d'Esch". nos cahiers (3/4): 11–26.
- Trausch, Gilbert (1992). Histoire du Luxembourg. Hatier. ISBN 2-218-03855-2.
- Trausch, Gilbert. L'ARBED dans la société luxembourgeoise. Arbed corporate publications s.d.
