= Agglomerate (steel industry) =

Steel Industry agglomerate

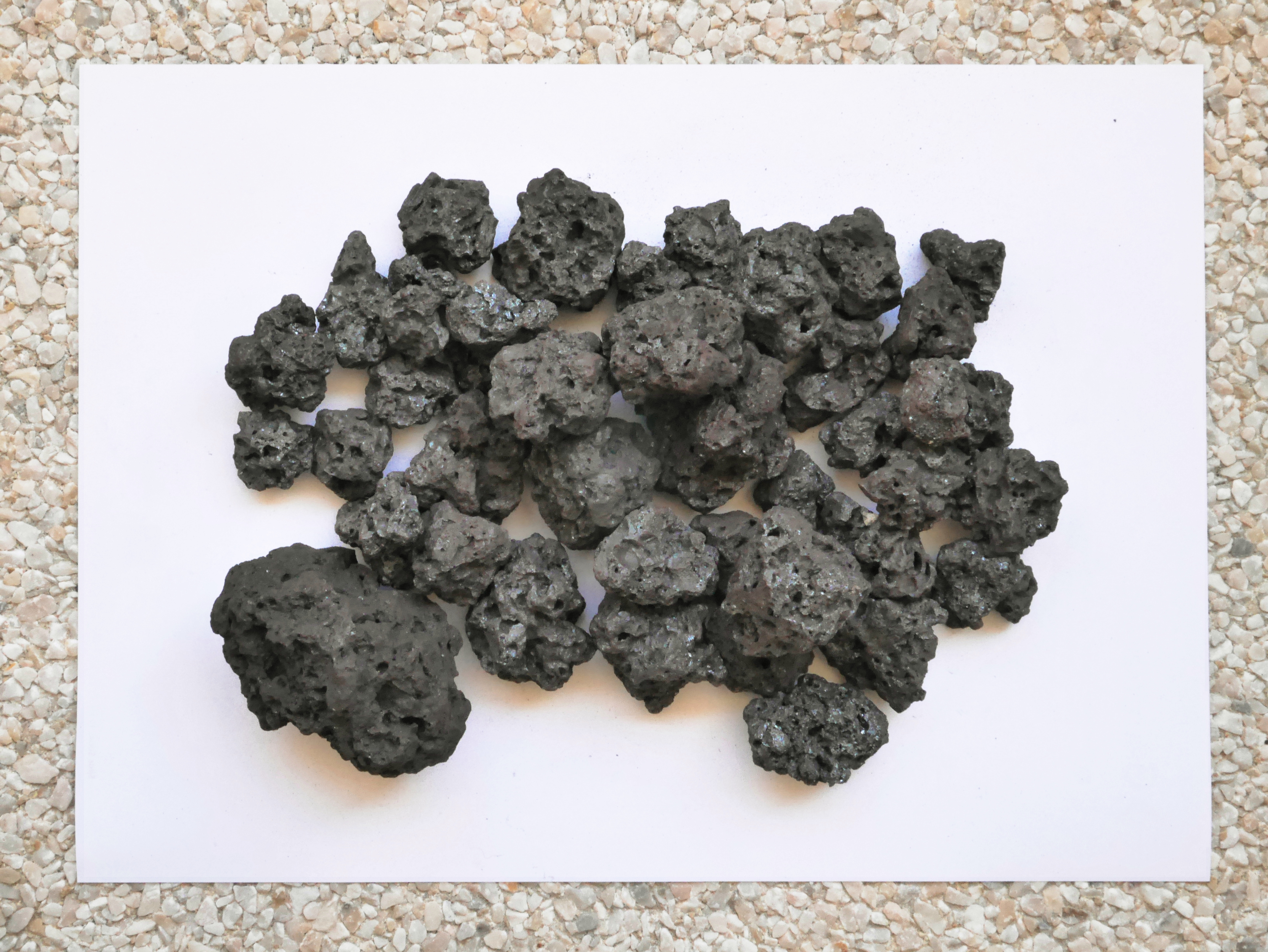
Pieces of agglomerate produced by the Dwight-Lloyd process, laid on an A4 sheet.

Agglomerate is a material composed of iron oxides and gangue, roasted and sintered (Note: In French-speaking Belgium, this material has been called "fritte" - with two t's because it is sintered and not fried - since it was produced and consumed there.) in an agglomeration plant. This product is obtained by burning coal previously mixed with iron ore and oxides. This conditioning of iron ore optimizes its use in the blast furnace.

== History ==
Expansion of iron ore sinter production in the 20th century.

The advantages of agglomeration were identified very early on, but the processes used at the time were not continuous. The primitive method, which consisted of a grindstone grate, was abandoned towards the end of the 19th century because it was too fuel-intensive. (Note: Ledebur (1895a, pp. 252–253)) Shaft furnaces then replaced them, their much higher efficiency being due both to the confinement of the reaction and to counter-current operation (the solids sink and the gases rise). (Note: Ledebur (1895a, pp. 254–271))

In these furnaces, iron ores were roasted to obtain the opposite result to the one we're looking for now: in 1895, roasting was carried out at low temperatures to avoid aggregation, and to obtain friable ore. (Note: Ledebur (1895a, pp. 244–251))

At the time, ore roasting furnaces were tanks inspired by blast furnaces and lime kilns, and were not very productive tools. (Note: Ledebur (1895a, pp. 260–270)) Around 1910, the Greenawald process, which automated the principle3, saw some development, enabling the production of 300,000 tonnes a year.

In June 1906, A.S. Dwight and R. L. Lloyd built the first agglomerating machine on a chain (also known as a grate), which began agglomerating copper and lead ores. The first agglomeration line for iron ores was built in 1910 in Birdsboro, Pennsylvania.

It took some thirty years for the sintering of ores on chains to become widespread in the steel industry. Whereas before the Second World War, it was mainly used for reconditioning ore fines, after 1945 it became widespread for processing raw ores. Today, it plays an essential role in the blending of different ores and, above all, in the incorporation of mineral wastes of varying iron content. This recycling role improves profitability and limits the amount of waste generated by steel complexes, which generate numerous iron-rich residues (slag, sludge, dust, etc.).

== Interests and limitations ==
=== Interests ===
Chipboard is a product optimized for use in blast furnaces. To do so, it must meet several conditions:

- be composed of a gangue of oxides which, combined with the ash from coke combustion (essentially silica), will give rise to a fusible slag which is both reactive towards impurities (in particular the sulfur provided by the coke), not very aggressive towards the refractories lining the blast furnace and of a quality suitable for its use;
- Ensure a precise particle size, generally between 20 and 80 mm (pieces that are too small clog up the furnace, and pieces that are too large take too long to transform in the core (Note: Ledebur (1895a, p. 237)));
- maintain permeability to reducing gases at the highest possible temperatures;
- low-temperature endothermic reactions that can be carried out more economically outside a blast furnace. These are essentially drying, calcination of the gangue (decarbonisation of limestone and dehydration of clay or gypsum), and reduction reactions. The agglomerate then becomes, at equal weight, richer in iron than the ore.
- over oxidize iron oxides, Fe_{2}O_{3} being better reduced by the carbon monoxide present in the blast furnace than less oxidized compounds, especially Fe_{3}O_{4}. (Note: Ledebur (1895a, p. 248))

Another advantage is the elimination of undesirable elements: the chain agglomeration process eliminates 80-95% of the sulfur present in the ore and its additives. It's also a way of getting rid of zinc, the element that "poisons" blast furnaces, as its vaporization temperature of 907 °C corresponds to that of a well-conducted roast. (Note: Ledebur (1895a, pp. 231–233, 245–247)) (Note: Historically, the roasting of pyrites, residues from the manufacture of sulfuric acid, was only intended to remove sulfur and zinc. Pyrites contain 60 to 65% iron and less than 0.01% phosphorus, but up to 6% sulfur and 12% zinc.)

=== Limitations ===
On the other hand, agglomerate is an abrasive product that damages blast furnace vessels, especially if these are not designed for absorber, (Note: § Saga of Lorraine's blast furnaces: their campaigns (Fontoy plant)) and is above all fragile. Repeated handling degrades its grain size and generates fines, making it unsuitable for packaging at sites far from blast furnaces: pellets are therefore preferable. Cold resistance, particularly to crushing, can be improved by increasing the energy input during sintering.

Improving mechanical strength also improves the performance of agglomerates in the processes that use them. The reduction of hematite (Fe_{2}O_{3}) to magnetite (Fe_{3}O_{4}) creates internal stresses. However, in addition to increasing the cost of agglomerate production, reducibility deteriorates when mechanical strength is sought.

== Composition ==
Agglomerates are generally classified as acidic or basic. The complete basicity index ic is calculated by the following ratio of mass concentrations:

$I_c = \frac{[CaO]+[MgO]} {[SiO_2]+[Al_2O_3]}$

It is often simplified by simply calculating a simplified basicity index noted i (or sometimes ia), equal to the ratio CaO / SiO_{2}. (Note: § Simplified (basicity) index) An agglomerate with an index ic of less than 1 is said to be acidic; above 1, it is generally said to be basic; equal to 1, it is said to be self-melting (i_{c}=1 being equivalent to i_{a}=1.40 (Note: § Reduced index)). Before the 1950s, agglomerates with an ic value of less than 0.5 were in the majority. Then, when it was realized that agglomerate could incorporate limestone, which was then charged into the blast furnace separately, basic indices became widespread: in 1965, indices below 0.5 represented less than 15% of the tonnage of agglomerate produced, while basic agglomerates accounted for 45%.

Again, we find the relationship: $\scriptstyle\ i_b = \frac{[CaO] + k \cdot [MgO]} {[SiO_2]}$ k being an empirically determined constant (sometimes equal, for simplicity, to 1 (Note: § Basicity)). Iron reduction is, in itself, favored by a basic environment, and peaks at 2<i_{b}<2.5. It is also in this range that mechanical strength is best (and also, the slag's fusibility is the worst, which complicates its removal from the blast furnace). Above an ib value of 2.6, the proportion of molten agglomerate increases, clogging the pores and slowing down chemical reactions between gases and oxides. As for acid agglomerates with an i_{b} index of less than 1, softening begins as soon as only around 15% of the ore has been reduced.

The optimum basicity index is therefore determined according to the ore used, the technical characteristics of the blast furnace, the intended use of the cast iron and the desired qualities. For example:

- Cast irons made from Minette (ore) and intended for refining using the Thomas process had basicities of i=1.35 (a complete index I=1), which was a compromise between low-temperature viscosity (which requires an acidic slag) and desulfurization (favored by a basic slag);
- plants for which sulfur-rich cast iron is not a problem adopt a more acidic agglomerate: with i= 0.9 to 1.0. This favors silicon reduction but can result in very high sulfur contents, from 0.1 to 0.25%;
- the production of ferromanganese in the blast furnace requires a high manganese yield and therefore high basicities, up to i = 1.7 or 1.8 (bearing in mind that in this particular case, the index corresponds to $\scriptstyle\ i = \frac{[CaO] + [MgO] + [BaO]} {[SiO_2]}$!). Meltability is a secondary consideration in this case, as slag temperatures can reach 1,650 °C (instead of 1,450 °C - 1,550 °C in the production of cast irons for refining).

== See also ==
- Speiss
- Sinter plant
- Agglomerate
- Pellet (steel industry)

== Bibliography ==
- Ledebur, Adolf (1895a). Manuel théorique et pratique de la métallurgie du fer, Tome I. Translated by de Langlade, Barbary. Librairie polytechnique Baudry et Cie éditeur.
- Ledebur, Adolf (1895b). Manuel théorique et pratique de la métallurgie du fer, Tome II. Translated by de Langlade, Barbary. Librairie polytechnique Baudry et Cie éditeur.
