= Minière et Métallurgique de Rodange =

S.A. Hauts-Fourneaux de Rodange (1872-1935) S.A. Minière et Métallurgique de Rodange (MMR) (1935-1973) S.A. Métallurgique et Minière de Rodange- Athus (MMRA)
- Industry: Steel
- Successor: ARES (Aciéries Rodange Esch-Schifflange) (1994); Arcelor Rodange (2006); ArcelorMittal Rodange and Schifflange S.A. (2008)
- Headquarters: Rodange, Luxembourg

The Minière et Métallurgique de Rodange (MMR) (mines and steelworks of Rodange) was a Luxembourgish blast furnace steel producer and mining company originally established in 1872 as the Hauts-Fourneaux de Rodange. From 1905 to 1935 the company was a division of the Ougrée-Marihaye company.

In 1973 the company was merged with the Société des Hauts Fourneaux et Aciéries d'Athus to form the company Métallurgique et Minière de Rodange-Athus (MMRA), and in 1978 ARBED acquired a 25% stake in the company. From the late 1970s onward the Athus plant closed and production of steel and mining activities ceased at Rodange. The company then became a re-roller of steel specialising in rails. In 1994 the company merged with another Luxembourg based steel company based in Schifflange (Note: ARBED – Esch-Schifflange (AES), founded 1871 by the Metz family as Usine METZ (Esch-Schifflange), formed part of ARBED in 1911. see Schifflange steelworks) to form ARES (Aciéries Rodange Esch-Schifflange) part of ProfilARBEB, the long products division of ARBED.

As of 2010, the remains of the company is known as ArcelorMittal Rodange & Schifflange S.A., part of the ArcelorMittal group.

== History ==
=== SA Hauts-Fourneaux de Rodange (1872-1935) ===
The Société Anonyme des Hauts-Fourneaux de Rodange was founded in 1872 by the brothers Charles and Jules Collart and Thomas Byrne with a capital of 2.5million Luxembourgish francs. Initially the works produced only pig iron. The first blast furnace began operation in 1878. In 1879 a 1.7 km ropeway conveyor was opened between the iron works and the Doihl mine. and in 1880 a second furnace began production. In the 1880s the company obtained concessions in the Walert Mine (Rumelange) and a mine at Ottange in Moselle, France. In 1897 the third blast furnace began operation.

In 1899 the company Usines et Fonderies de Rodange was founded, for the production of pipes and other metal castings. (In 1908 it was taken over by SA Hauts-Forneaux de Rodange.)

In 1905 the company merged into Ougrée-Marihaye. ending its independent existence, becoming a division of Ougrée-Marihaye.

A Gilchrist-Thomas converter was added in 1907, and in 1911 a plant was created for the milling of phosphate slag by Antwerp firm Totte, Milch & Cie; in 1919 this mill was acquired by the Steelworks of Rodange.

In the 1910s the blast furnaces were modernised and the number increased to five. During the 1930s after the stock market crash the firm Ougrée-Marihaye required financial support, and was restructured in the later 1930s; the division S.A. Minière et Métallurgique de Rodange-Ougrée – MMR was formed in 1935 and became independent again as S.A. Minière et Métallurgique de Rodange (MMR) in 1936.

=== Minière et Métallurgique de Rodange (1936-1972) ===
During the Second World War the plant was operated under German control, in 1944 it regain its independence. After the war blast furnace 1 was rebuilt to a 5m diameter by 1949 (operational 1954); in 1949 the plant had five blast furnaces, four converters, two cupola furnaces for cast iron and two for ferromanganese, medium (600mm) and small (~350mm) rolling trains, a casting foundry, a mill for the processing of slag and various workshops in an area of ~300 ha (3,000,000 m^{2}).

In 1950 the blooming mill became electrically operated, in the 1950s and 60s further machines were converted to electric power, LDAC process (basic oxygen steelmaking) was introduced replacing the Gilchrist–Thomas process, and other modernisations and improvements made.

In 1972 the company is renamed S.A. Métallurgique et Minière de Rodange and in 1973 the plant merges with the nearby steelworks situated in Athus to form Métallurgique et Minière de Rodange – Athus (MMRA), the steelworks in Athus is completely closed soon after.

=== Métallurgique et Minière de Rodange – Athus (1972-1994) ===
In 1978 ARBED acquired a 25% stake in the company.

The 1970s steel crisis not only caused the closure of the Athus steelworks in 1977, but also all mining, casting and steel making activities were ended in Rodange in 1978; the steel mill now being supplied by torpedo wagon from other ARBED steel plants. In the 1980s the plant became a re-roller of steel, specialising in railway rails.

In 1994 the plant merged with the Schifflange steelworks (part of the ARBED group) to form ARES (Aciéries Rodange Esch-Schifflange).

=== ARES and successors (1994-) ===
From 1994 to 2006 the company ARES followed the fate of its parent ARBED, becoming part of Arcelor in 2003, and part of ArcelorMittal in 2006.

From 2008 the plants in Rodange and Schifflange are named ArcelorMittal Rodange and Schifflange S.A., as of 2010 they are part of the division "ARCELORMittal Long Carbon Europe", the Rodange plant has two rolling mills producing rebar, crane rails and other long rolled steel products.

== See also ==
- Mining in Luxembourg
- Steel industry in Luxembourg
