= Davignon =

Davignon is a surname of French origin. Notable people with the surname include:

- Étienne Davignon (1932–2026), Belgian diplomat and civil servant
- Jean Davignon (born 1935), Canadian physician, medical researcher, and academic
- Julien Davignon (1854–1916), Belgian politician
- Marie Davignon, Canadian cinematographer and film director
- Mario Davignon, Canadian costume designer
- Pierre Davignon (1810–1878), Canadian physician and politician

== See also ==
- Davignon Plan, named after Étienne Davignon
- Davignon report, named after Étienne Davignon
- Avignon, prefecture and commune in southeastern France
