= Sinter =

Sinter may refer to:

- Sinter plant, in which iron-ore dust gets mixed with other fine materials at high temperature, to create a product – sinter – for use in a blast furnace
- Sintering, a high temperature process for fusing powder together
- Calcareous sinter, calcium carbonate deposited by springs
- Siliceous sinter, silica deposited by hot springs and geysers
