= Pellet (steel industry) =

Form of iron ore

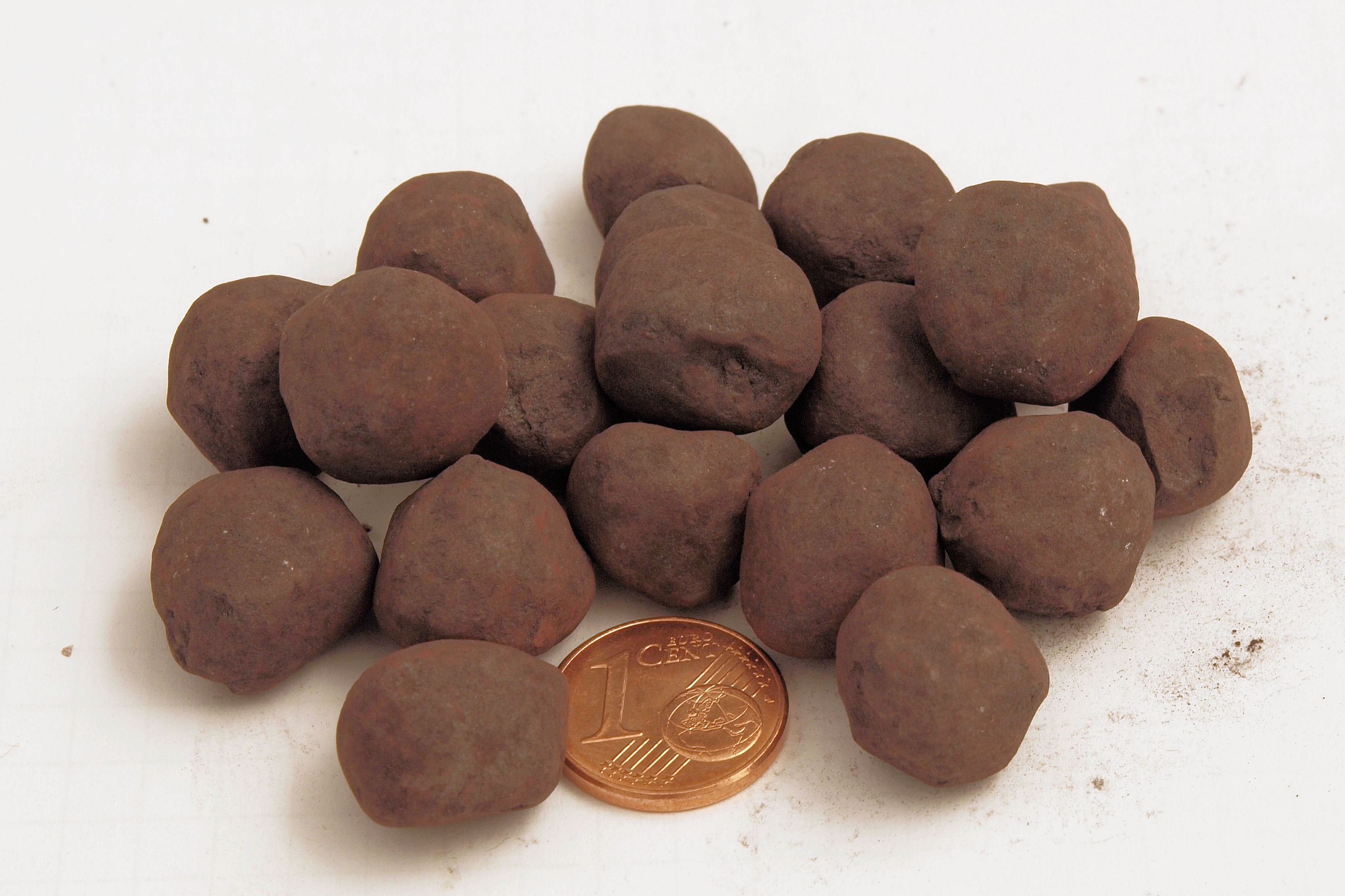
Iron ore pellets produced by LKAB, from ore mined in northern Sweden.

Pellets are a processed form of iron ore utilized in the steel industry, specifically designed for direct application in blast furnaces or direct reduction plants. These pellets are spherical in shape, with diameters ranging from 8 to 18 millimeters.

The production of iron ore pellets involves several steps, including grinding the ore, mixing it with binders, and then forming and heating the pellets. The iron content of the pellets generally ranges from 62% to 66%. This enrichment process improves the iron concentration and imparts specific chemical and mechanical properties that enhance the efficiency of steel production.

== History ==
Expansion of pellet production, compared with agglomerate and pig iron production.

The pelletizing of powdered iron ores was first introduced at the end of the nineteenth century, utilizing tar as a binding agent, comprising 1% by weight. This method involved firing the mixture in a rotating drum to create pellets suitable for blast furnaces, while also facilitating the removal of undesirable elements such as sulfur and arsenic through the emitted fumes.

During this period, pellet sintering developed alongside grate sintering as an alternative process to address the agglomeration challenges faced by high-quality iron ore products. The concept of pellet agglomeration was initially patented by A. Anderson in Sweden in 1912, followed by a similar patent in Germany in 1913. The resultant product was named "GEROELL", derived from the German word for "rolling." Pellets produced through this method demonstrated faster reduction rates compared to calibrated ores and agglomerates made from the same feedstock. In 1926, an industrial pilot plant was constructed by Krupp in Rheinhausen to explore the potential of this pelletizing technology. However, the plant was later dismantled to make way for the installation of a large-scale grate sintering line, which emerged as a competing process in the industry.

Pellet sintering has remained a viable method for processing iron ore. In the United States, this technique was employed to process fine concentrates from the Mesabi Range during World War II. This was necessary as naturally rich iron ores (containing over 50% iron) were being depleted. The development of pelletizing fine magnetite ores, which typically have less than 44 mm in size and are around 85% iron, began around 1943 with support from the University of Minnesota. The process was later adopted in Europe, particularly in Sweden, to facilitate the production of pre-reduced iron ore. Chile opened its first pelletizing facility in 1978 –Planta de Pellets in the port of Huasco– helping iron mining in Chile to remain competitive in face increased ore production in Australia, Brazil and Liberia.

Pellet production saw substantial growth between 1960 and 1980 but eventually plateaued at approximately 300 million tons annually. The following data illustrates pellet production over several years:

- In 1984, global pellet production reached 189 million tons, with North America producing 90 million tons, the USSR 63 million tons, and other regions 36 million tons.
- By 1992, production had increased to 264 million tons.
- In 2008, production further rose to 313 million tons.
- However, in 2009, production decreased to 215 million tons due to the economic crisis.
- In 2010, production rebounded to 388 million tons.

The internaltional price for iron pellets hoovered around 45 (±10) US dollars cents per dry long ton unit (DLTU) from 1981 to 1997.

== Production ==
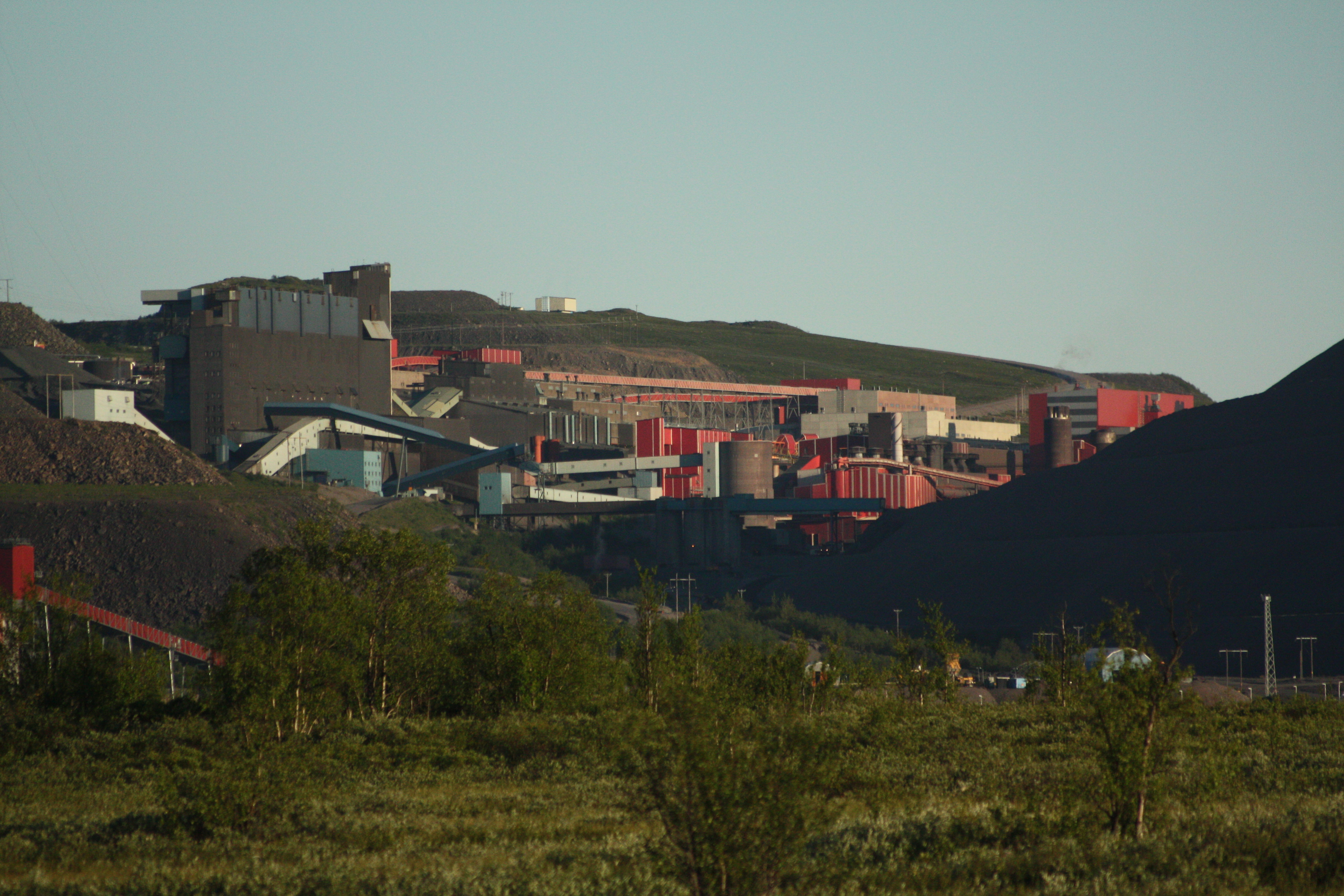
Enrichment and pelletizing plant at the Kiruna mine in Sweden.

Pellets are produced directly at the extraction site by mining companies and are marketed as a distinct product, unlike agglomerates which are typically manufactured at blast furnace sites through the mixing of iron ores from various sources. Pellets are generally more robust and better suited to handling compared to agglomerates, which are relatively fragile. The production process for pellets can vary significantly depending on the local characteristics of the iron ore, and some facilities may include additional stages, such as arsenic removal. The pellet production process involves several key stages:

- Crushing: The iron ore is first finely crushed to separate the valuable iron ore from non-valuable gangue materials.
- Enrichment: Depending on the ore's characteristics, enrichment is achieved through grinding (which can be conducted in multiple phases and may use either dry or wet methods) and by employing magnetic separation and flotation techniques.
- Blending: The ore concentrate may be mixed with additives to achieve the desired chemical composition. Common additives include dolomite, olivine, and quartzite, which typically account for 3 to 3.5% of the pellet's weight.
- Binding: To ensure cohesion during the pelletizing process, an additional binder, usually wet bentonite combined with maize flour or polyacrylamide, is added.

These processes ensure that the pellets are produced to meet specific quality standards and can withstand the demands of handling and transportation.

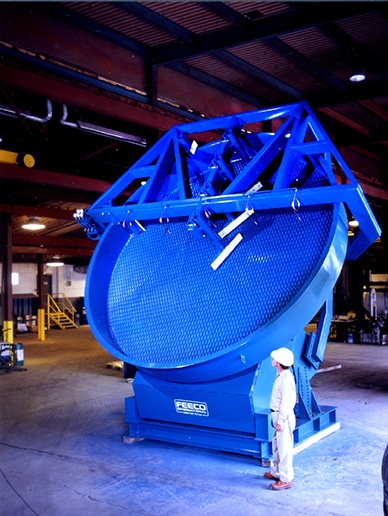
A saucer used to make pellets from iron ore concentrate.

The ore concentrate is formed into pellets through a compaction process. This can be performed using various types of mixing equipment, though saucers are the most commonly employed tool. Before being subjected to sintering, the pellets are referred to as "green" or "raw" pellets, and their typical diameter ranges from 5 to 20 mm.

Following pellet formation, they are either sent to a consumption plant or directed to a cooking oven. Due to their inherent fragility, which persists despite the binder used, pellets are generally more suitable for processing in a cooking oven rather than a consumption plant. After cooking, the pellets are cooled.

The cooking process involves passing the pellets through a chain of contiguous ovens, where they are heated to temperatures of up to 1,200°C. This can be achieved using different methods: a straight grate process for a single, uninterrupted chain or a grate kiln process that includes a rotating cooling tray at the end of the chain. The required heat for this process is supplied by burners, which can either add fuel to the ore concentrate or facilitate the oxidation of the ore, depending on the specific type of ore being processed.

== Benefits and limitations ==
=== Benefits ===
Pelletizing ore enhances the efficiency of blast furnaces and direct reduction plants by providing several advantages over raw iron ore:

- Handling Resistance: Pellets are more resilient to handling, including in wet conditions, and do not cause clogging in storage hoppers.
- Uniform Composition: The consistent and known composition of pellets facilitates a more streamlined process for converting them into iron.
- Optimal Porosity: The porosity of pellets enables effective gas-solid chemical reactions within the furnace. This porosity helps maintain the material’s mechanical strength and chemical reactivity, even in the furnace’s highest temperature zones.
- Efficient Reduction: The controlled oxidation state of iron oxides in pellets allows carbon monoxide to more effectively reduce Fe_{2}O_{3} compared to less oxidized compounds like Fe_{3}O_{4}.

Pellets generally contain a higher iron content than agglomerated ore, leading to increased plant productivity and reduced fuel consumption. They are also more durable and capable of withstanding repeated handling. Despite their higher cost—typically about 70% more than raw ore—the benefits they offer in terms of efficiency and performance justify the expense. In steelmaking, pellets are often mixed with sinter in varying proportions to optimize the process.

Similar to sinter, the high-temperature roasting and sintering of pellets effectively eliminate undesirable elements such as sulfur. It is also an efficient method for removing zinc, which can otherwise hinder the operation of blast furnaces. With a vaporization temperature of 907°C, zinc is effectively removed during the roasting process, making pelletizing a suitable method for this application. (Note: Historically, the roasting of pyrites, residues from the manufacture of sulfuric acid, was only intended to remove sulfur and zinc. Pyrites contain 60-65% iron, less than 0.01% phosphorus, and up to 6% sulfur and 12% zinc.)

=== Limitations ===
Pellets are vulnerable to sulfur-induced damage during the reduction process in blast furnaces. Even low levels of sulfur dioxide (SO₂) can interfere with furnace operations, with effects observed at concentrations as low as 5 to 50 parts per million (ppm) in the reduction gas. The detailed mechanism behind this issue was only fully understood towards the end of the 20th century. Initially, sulfur accelerates the extraction of oxygen from the iron oxide, but this effect reverses once metallic iron begins to form, significantly slowing the oxygen extraction process. This unusual behavior is attributed to sulfur's strong affinity for the metallic iron that forms on the pellet surface, which inhibits the penetration of carbon.

Furthermore, the reaction between wustite (FeO) and carbon monoxide (CO) occurs not only on the surface of FeO but also beneath the surface of the reduced iron. Due to iron's superior absorption characteristics, a substantial portion of gas transport happens at the iron/iron oxide phase boundary. This process depends on the iron's ability to absorb sufficient carbon (carburization). If sulfur obstructs carbon absorption, reduction is limited to the surface of the iron oxide. This restriction results in the formation of elongated, fibrous iron crystals, as iron crystallization can only proceed in the direction of the reducing iron oxide. Consequently, the structure of the granules becomes reinforced and can expand to two or three times their original volume. This expansion, or "swelling," of the granules can lead to blockage or significant damage to the blast furnace, highlighting the challenges associated with using pellets in blast furnace operations.

== Composition ==
Pellets, similar to agglomerates, are classified based on their chemical properties as either acidic or basic. To determine the basicity index (i_{c}), the following ratio of mass concentrations is used:

$i_c = \frac{[CaO]+[MgO]} {[SiO_2]+[Al_2O_3]}$

This ratio helps in assessing the relative basicity of the pellets, which is important for optimizing their use in blast furnaces and other metallurgical processes.

In practice, a simplified basicity index (i) is commonly used to classify pellets based on their chemical properties. This index is calculated using the ratio of calcium oxide (CaO) to silicon dioxide (SiO_{2}):

$\ce{i=\frac{CaO}{SiO2}}$

- Pellets with an index (i) less than 1 are classified as acidic.
- Pellets with an index (i) greater than 1 are categorized as basic.
- Pellets with an index (i) equal to 1 are referred to as self-melting.

Pellets can contain high levels of hematite, but the proportion must be controlled. Excessive hematite can weaken the pellet structure during reduction, leading to the pellets breaking down into dust under the weight of stacked charges. This is due to the fact that a high hematite content can cause the pellets to disintegrate, compromising their integrity and usability in the reduction process.

=== Acid pellets ===
Acid pellets are produced without the addition of additives, resulting in a specific chemical composition. Typically, the composition of acid pellets is as follows: 2.2% SiO_{2} and 0.2% CaO. In the United States during the 1990s, the typical characteristics of acid pellets were:

- Chemical Composition: 66% Fe, 4.8% SiO_{2}, 0.2% MgO, and a CaO/SiO_{2} ratio of 0.04.
- Compressive Strength: 250 kg.
- ISO Reducibility: 1.0.
- Swelling Ratio: 16%.
- Softening Temperature: 1290°C, with a difference of 230°C between the softening and melting temperatures.

Unlike agglomerated ores, which may include basic fluxes like silicates in the binder during pelletizing, acid pellets maintain their acidic composition due to their solid spherical shape. This design helps preserve their mechanical properties and reduces the risk of disintegration.

Acid pellets exhibit notable mechanical strength with a crush resistance exceeding 250 kg per pellet. However, their reducibility could be improved. Additionally, they are prone to swelling when exposed to lime, especially when the basicity index (i = CaO / SiO_{2}) exceeds 0.25, which may potentially cause issues in a blast furnace.

=== Self-melting pellets ===
Self-melting pellets, also known as basic pellets, are a type of iron ore pellet that was developed in the United States in the 1990s. These pellets are designed for use in blast furnaces and are produced by adding lime (calcium oxide) and magnesia (magnesium oxide) to iron ore concentrate, enhancing their metallurgical properties. Self-melting pellets typically have the following properties:

- Iron (Fe) content: 63%
- Silicon dioxide (SiO_{2}) content: 4.2%
- Magnesium oxide (MgO) content: 1.6%
- Calcium oxide to silicon dioxide ratio (CaO/SiO_{2}): 1.10
- Compressive strength: 240 kg per pellet
- ISO reducibility: 1.2
- Expansion ratio: 15%
- Softening temperature: 1,440°C, with a difference of 80°C between the softening and melting temperatures

These pellets are recognized for their high compressive strength and ease of reduction, making them well-suited for blast furnace operations. The production process of self-melting pellets involves incorporating limestone into the iron ore concentrate. This inclusion affects the productivity of pellet plants due to the calcination process, which involves the endothermic process of limestone. As a result, the overall productivity of the pellet plant can decrease by approximately 10 to 15% compared to the production of acid pellets, which do not include lime. Self-melting pellets are appreciated for their enhanced performance in blast furnaces but require consideration of the trade-offs in production efficiency.

=== Pellets with low silica content ===
These pellets are designed for use in direct reduction plants. The typical composition of the pellets includes: 67.8% iron (Fe), 1.7% silicon dioxide (SiO_{2} ), 0.40% aluminum oxide (Al_{2}O_{3}), 0.50% calcium oxide (CaO), 0.30% magnesium oxide (MgO), and 0.01% phosphorus (P).

Low-silica pellets, when doped with lime, can self-fuse. A typical composition for these self-fusing pellets is: 65.1% iron (Fe), 2.5% silicon dioxide (SiO_{2}), 0.45% aluminum oxide (Al_{2}O_{3} ), 2.25% calcium oxide (CaO), 1.50% magnesium oxide (MgO), and 0.01% phosphorus (P).

=== Other types of pellets ===
To cater to specific customer needs, manufacturers have developed alternative pellet types that offer distinct properties and performance characteristics:

- Self-Reducing Pellets: Self-reducing pellets are composed of iron ore and coal, which serve as an internal reducing agent during smelting. This design allows the pellets to undergo reduction without the need for additional reducing materials, enhancing efficiency in certain metallurgical processes.
- Magnesian Pellets: Magnesian pellets are created by adding minerals such as olivine or serpentine, which increase the magnesia (MgO) content to approximately 1.5%. These pellets are characterized by their balanced performance in blast furnaces, with an average cold crush resistance of around 180 kg per pellet. The added magnesia helps improve the metallurgical properties of the pellets, making them suitable for specific reduction conditions.

These alternative pellet types are designed to address different operational requirements and enhance the flexibility of iron-making processes.

== Bibliography ==
- Forsythe, Robert (1909). The blast furnace and the Manufacture of pig iron. David Williams Co.
- Pazdej, R. (1988). Aide-mémoire sidérurgique : les matières premières (in French). Rapport IRSID.
- Corbion, Jacques (2016). Le savoir… fer — Glossaire du haut-fourneau : Le langage… (savoureux, parfois) des hommes du fer et de la zone fonte, du mineur au… cokier d'hier et d'aujourd'hui (PDF) (in French). Vol. 5. L’HUILLIER. ISBN 978-2-9520787-1-9.
- Ask World Steel Dynamics (2011). "August 2011 - AIST". YUMPU. AIST.
- Halt, J. A.; Kawatra, S. (2013). Review of Organic Binders for Iron Ore Agglomeration (PDF). Department of Chemical Engineering Michigan Technological University.
- Remus, Rainer; Roudier, Serge; Delgado Sancho, Luis; Aguado-Monsonet, Miguel A. (2013). Best Available Techniques (BAT) Reference Document for Iron and Steel Production. Joint Research Centre of the European Commission. pp. 187–208. ISBN 978-92-79-26476-4.
- Ledebur, Adolf (1895). Manuel théorique et pratique de la métallurgie du fer, Tome I et Tome II (in French). Translated by Barbary de Langlade. pp. 231–233, 245–248.
- Oeters, Franz; Steffen, Rolf (1982). "Das Hochofenverhalten von Möller und Koks". Metallurgie: Berichte, gehalten im Kontaktstudium "Metallurgie des Eisens" (in German). Verlag Stahleisen. pp. 95–101, 104–107. ISBN 9783514002593.
- Strassburger, Julius H.; Brown, Dwight C.; Dancy, Terence E.; Stephenson, Robert L. (1969). Blast furnace: Theory and practice, vol. 1. New York: Gordon and Breach Science Publishers. pp. 221–239.
- Geerdes, Maarten; Toxopeus, Hisko; Vliet, Cor van der (2009). Modern blast furnace iron making : An introduction. IOS Press. ISBN 9781607500407.
- Bhagat, Ram (2019). Agglomeration of iron ores. CRC Press. ISBN 978-1138035089.
- Yang, Yongxiang; Raipala, Kalevi; Holappa, Lauri (2014). Treatise on Process Metallurgy: Industrial Processes. Vol. 3. Elsevier. pp. 2–88. ISBN 978-0-08-096988-6.

== Related articles ==
- Agglomerate (steel industry)
