= Speiss =

Speisses are alloys of heavy metals like iron, cobalt, nickel and copper with arsenic, antimony and, occasionally, tin. The latter elements lower the melting point to around 1000 °C. Speisses commonly occur in lead smelting operations and copper smelting operations.

Speisses are only partially miscible with mattes, and if there is enough arsenic or antimony in the copper feed to a matte smelting furnace, a separate speiss melt can form. Speisses show high affinities for platinum group metals and gold. The mass concentration of platinum group metals in the speiss phase is about 1000 times that of the concentration in the matte phase, while the ratio for gold is about 100 times.

Speisses are also immiscible in liquid lead and flow out of lead blast furnaces as a separate phase.

== See also ==
- Agglomerate (Steel industry)
- Bronze
- Stannite
