= Agglomerate =

Coarse accumulation of volcanic material

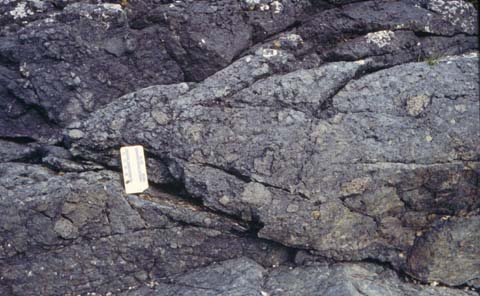
Mesozoic agglomerate of the Seymour Canal Formation in Alaska, United States

Agglomerate (from the Latin agglomerare meaning "to form into a ball") is a coarse accumulation of large blocks of volcanic material that contains at least 75% bombs. Volcanic bombs differ from volcanic blocks in that their shape records fluidal surfaces: they may, for example, have ropy, cauliform, scoriaceous, folded, spindle, spatter, ribbon, ragged, or amoeboid shapes. Globular masses of lava may have been shot from the crater at a time when partly molten lava was exposed, and was frequently shattered by sudden outbursts of steam. These bombs were viscous at the moment of ejection and by rotation in the air acquired their shape. They are commonly 1 to 2 feet (30 to 60 cm) in diameter, but specimens as large as 12 feet (3.7 m) have been observed. There is less variety in their composition at any one volcanic centre than in the case of the lithic blocks, and their composition indicates the type of magma being erupted.

Agglomerates are typically found near volcanic vents and within volcanic conduits, where they may be associated with pyroclastic or intrusive volcanic breccias. Older (pre-1970) publications, particularly in Scotland, referred to any coarse-grained volcaniclastic rock as 'agglomerate', which led to debris flow deposits, talus deposits and other types of breccia being mistaken for vents. Agglomerates are typically poorly sorted, may contain a fine ash or tuff matrix and vary from matrix to clast support. They may be monolithologic or heterolithic, and may contain some blocks of various igneous rocks. There are various differences between agglomerates and ordinary ash beds or tuffs. Agglomerates are coarser and less frequently well-bedded. Agglomerates can be non-welded or welded, such as coarse basaltic 'spatter'. They typically form proximally during Strombolian eruptions, and are common at strongly peralkaline volcanoes. Some large agglomerate deposits are deposited from pyroclastic density currents during explosive caldera-forming eruptions, such as at Santorini, Taal, and Campi Flegrei. They may be massive to crudely bedded, and can attain great thicknesses.

Crystalline masses of a different kind occur in some numbers in certain agglomerates. They consist of volcanic minerals very much the same as those formed in the lava, but exhibiting certain peculiarities which indicate that they have formed slowly under pressure at considerable depths. They bear a resemblance to plutonic igneous rocks, but are more correctly to be regarded as agglomerations of crystals formed within the liquid lava as it slowly rose towards the surface, and at a subsequent period cast out by violent steam explosions. The sanidinites of the Eifel belong to this group. At Vesuvius, Ascension Island, St Vincent and many other volcanoes, they form a considerable part of the coarser ash-beds. Their commonest minerals are olivine, anorthite, hornblende, augite, biotite, and leucite.

== See also ==
- Conglomerate (geology)
- Agglomerate (steel industry)
- Sinter plant
