= Mining in Luxembourg =

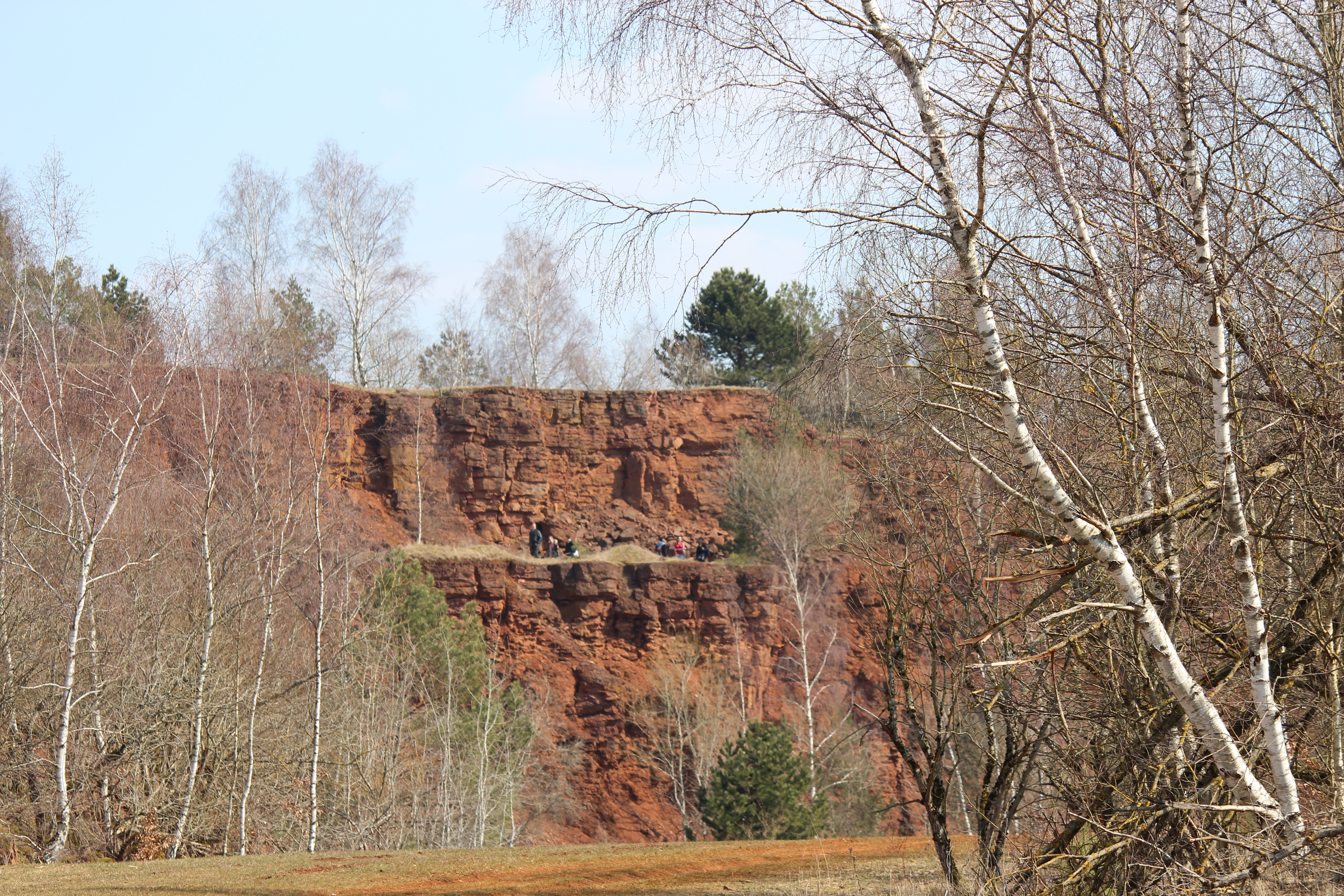
Former open-space iron-ore mining area near Esch-sur-Alzette

Mining in Luxembourg mostly refers to the extraction of iron ores, known as Minette. Iron-ore mining, both open-pit and underground, had significant economic and political importance in Luxembourg for an entire century, especially from the second half of the 19th century onwards. This was especially the case after modern technology made it possible to make use of the oolitic iron ores found in the region for iron and steel production. These iron ores were already known during Roman times, but the technological capabilities to exploit them did not yet exist.

In addition to iron ore mining, stone quarrying, shale mining, the Goesdorf antimony mine, the Allerborn lead mine, the Walferdange gypsum mines, and the copper mine near Stolzembourg were also operated, although copper mining never gained significant importance in Luxembourg.

== Production history ==
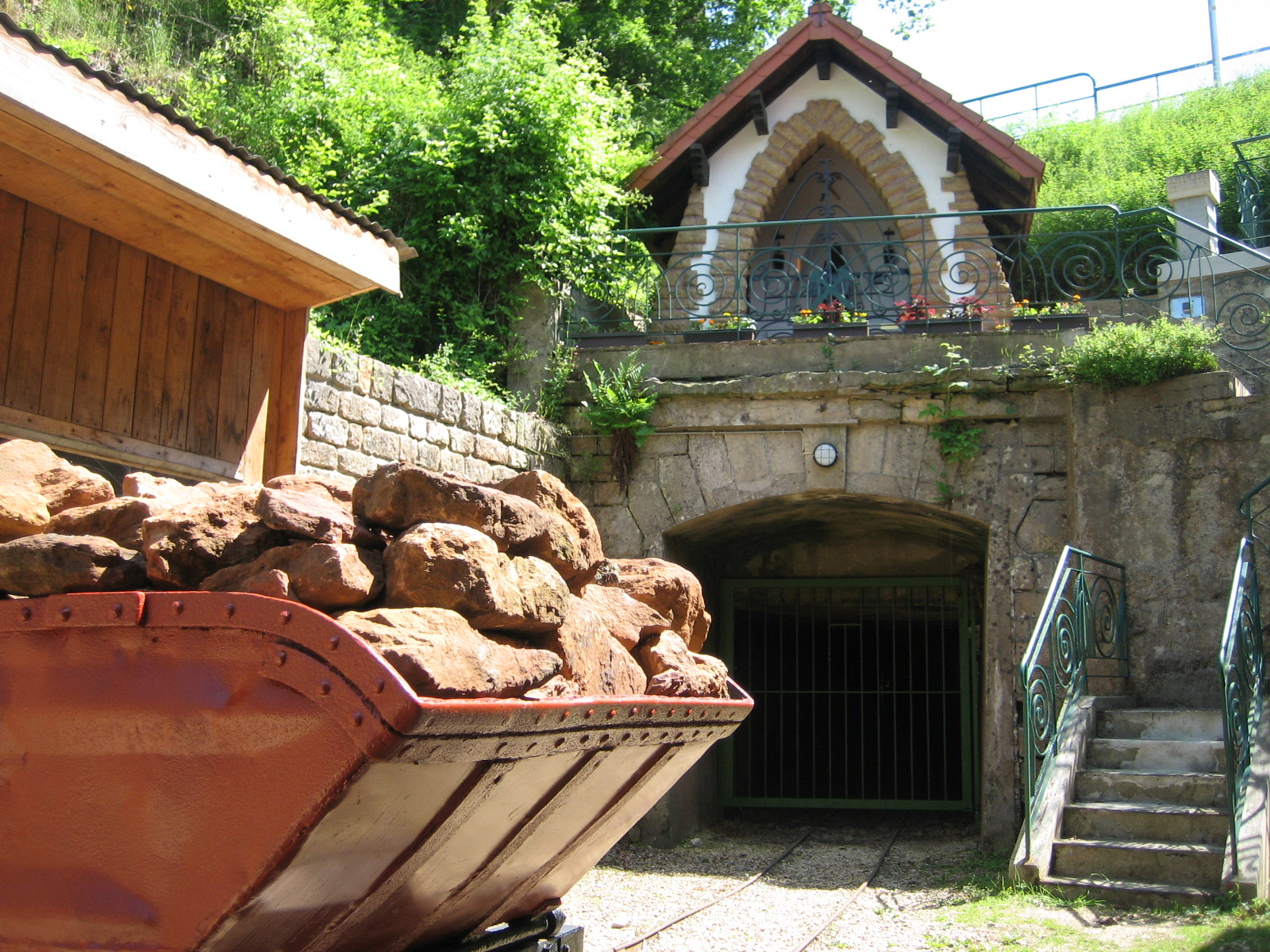
Entrance of the former Cockerill mine, Ellergronn, near Esch-sur-Alzette, with a wayside chapel above the entrance

The extraction of Minette ore varied significantly from year to year. After reaching a peak production of around 8 million tons in the 1950s, mining declined sharply from the 1960s onwards. The economic viability of Luxembourgish Minette was relatively weak compared to the iron ore deposits of the Briey Basin in France or those in Scandinavia or Brazil (25-32%) and had a high phosphorus content. It should also be noted that due to the many private mines not bound to the steel industry, iron ore mining was heavily export-dependent and suffered during difficult times in neighbouring countries.

Minette was exported for decades to Germany, the Saarland, France, and Belgium. In some years, these exports were almost entirely suspended. This also led to significant fluctuations in the number of miners employed. However, this trend was somewhat mitigated by the employment of many immigrant workers, mainly from the Mediterranean region.

In the late 1960s and 1970s, iron ore mining in Luxembourg was in decline. In 1981, with the closure of the Thillebierg mine in Differdange, the last mine in Luxembourg was shut down. The numbers employed in iron-ore mining in Luxembourg developed as follows:

- 1965: 1,885
- 1970: 1,151
- 1975: 736
- 1980: 226
- 1985: 0

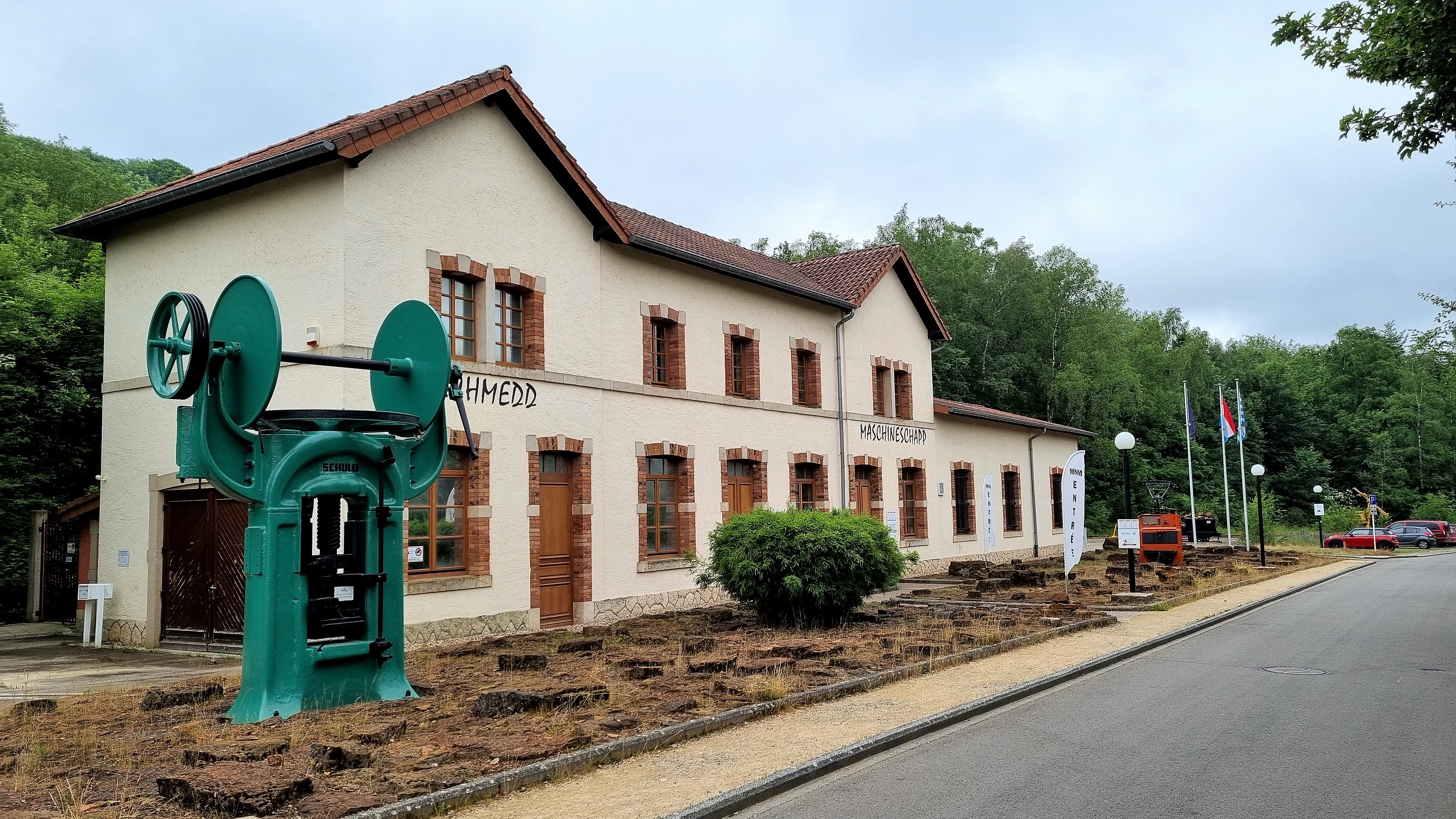
National Mining Museum in Rumelange

Today, only the celebration of Saint Barbara (Bäerbelendag), the patron saint of miners, and the National Mining Museum in Rumelange, serve as reminders of the heyday of Luxembourg's mining industry.

== Bibliography and further reading ==
- Allamano, Willy (2005). Dem Biergmann seng Luuchten. Imprimerie Polyprint.
- Allamano, Willy (2008). Die Drahtseilbahnen im Großherzogtum Luxemburg und Lothringen. Imprimerie Polyprint. ISBN 9782879966687.
- Bernard, Francis (2002). Thema Bergbau in Kunst, Literatur, Film und Musik in Luxembourg - Ein Verzeichnis. Éditions Kremer-Müller.
- Hemmer, Carlo (1948). L'économie du Grand-Duché de Luxembourg - Première Partie: Les conditions naturelles et sociales, La production primaire. Luxembourg: Éditions Beffort.
- Klein, Marcel (1985). Nationale Minnemuséium zou Rëmëléng. Luxembourg: Imprimerie St. Paul.
- Lorang, Fernand (1999). Bergbauliche Geschichtsblätter. Luxembourg: Imprimerie St. Paul.
- Maas, Jacques (1 April 1994). "August Thyssen und die luxemburgische Minenkonzessionsaffäre von 1912". Hémecht (in German). 46 (2).
- Quintus, Norbert (1988). D'Aarbecht an de Galerien. Luxembourg: Imprimerie St. Paul.
- Raggi, Pascal (2017). "La désindustrialisation et les entreprises minières et sidérurgiques au Grand-Duché de Luxembourg et en Lorraine du fer (années 1960-2006)". In Daumas, Jean-Claude; Kharaba, Ivan; Mioche, Philippe (eds.). La désindustrialisation: une fatalité?. Les Cahiers de la MSHE Ledoux (in French). Besançon: Presses universitaires de Franche-Comté. pp. 103–121. doi:10.4000/books.pufc.20934. ISBN 978-2-84867-796-5.

== See also ==
- National Mining Museum, Luxembourg
- Steel industry in Luxembourg
