= Aloyse Meyer =

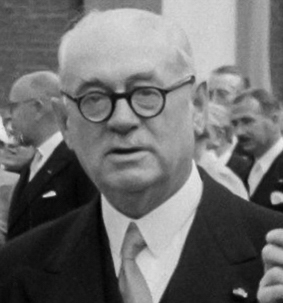
Aloyse Meyer, 1951

Aloyse Meyer (31 October 1883 in Clervaux - 3 May 1952) was a Luxembourgish engineer and manager in the steel industry.

He studied engineering at the university of Aachen, and in 1903 was employed by the Dudelange office of works. A few months later he became Ingenieur adjoint at the foundry in Dudelange, in 1906 Chef de service and in 1912 director. In 1918, he was appointed to the headquarters of Arbed as technical director, becoming its director-general in 1920.

In 1925, Meyer became the head of the Chamber of Commerce, and in 1928 after the death of Émile Mayrisch, became president of the European steel union. Under the German occupation of Luxembourg in World War II, he remained as the director of ARBED. Just before US troops liberated Luxembourg in September 1944, Meyer was arrested by the Gestapo, acting on orders from Berlin, and taken to a prison in Wittlich in western Germany, along with his son Frank, and the head of the steel trading association Columeta, Michel Goedert. They were later released from prison, but remained in Germany under Gestapo surveillance until the war's end, and were unable to return to Luxembourg until April 1945. It later became known that he had directed large amounts of his own money towards the Belgian resistance and Belgian charities from 1942.

After the war, he rejoined Arbed, the president of its executive board in April 1947.

Meyer was married to Eugénie Heintz, a descendant of the founder of the cigarette factory Heintz Van Landewyck. After the death of his father-in-law, Victor Heintz, Meyer in 1931 became president of the board of Heintz Van Landewyck, which he remained until his death. His son Robert Meyer, started his career in 1934 as an engineer at Heintz Van Landewyck.

== Honours ==
- Grand Officer of the Ordre de la Couronne de Chêne
- Grand Officer of the Ordre de Mérite civil et militaire d'Adolphe de Nassau
- Grand Officer of the Légion d'honneur
- Grand Officer of the Belgian Ordre de la Couronne
- Grand Officer of the Ordre d'Orange-Nassau

== See also ==
- Steel industry in Luxembourg
