= Ougrée-Marihaye =

Belgian iron and steel producing company

Sociéte anonyme Ougrée-Marihaye
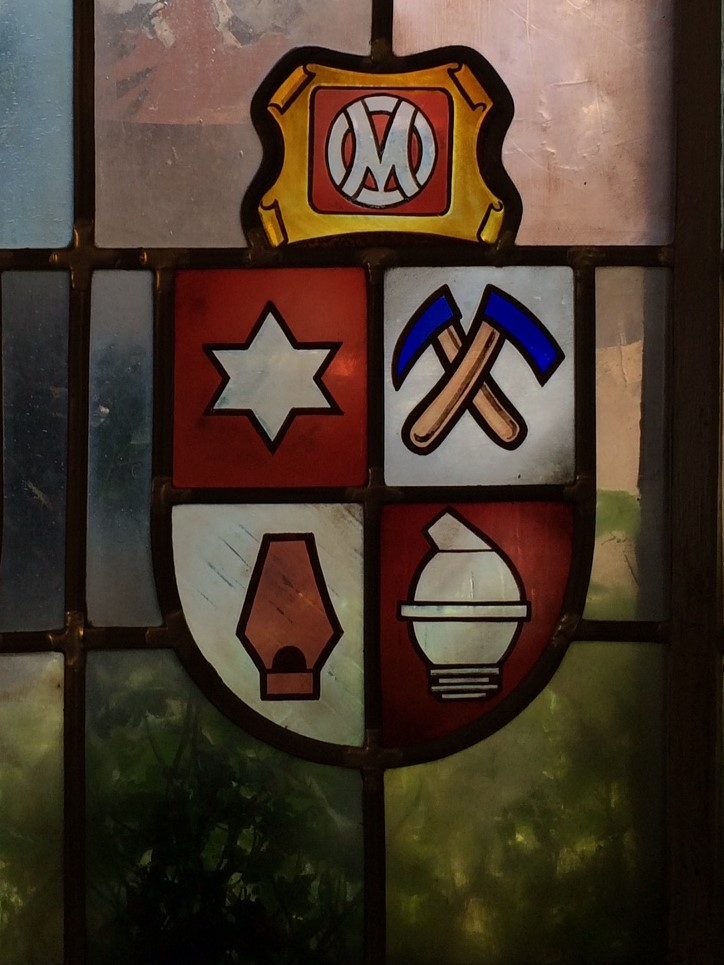
- Industry: Manufacture of basic iron and steel and of ferro-alloys metal industry
- Predecessor: Sociéte anonyme Ougrée; Société des Charbonnages de Marihaye
- Founded: 1900
- Successor: Cockerill-Ougrée (1955) current ArcelorMittal Liège hot products division (Ougrée)

The Belgian iron and steel producing company Ougrée-Marihaye was formed in 1835 by the merger of the iron and steel works in Ougrée (nr. Seraing) in Liège Province, and the coal mines of Marihaye. The company merged with the Société anonyme John Cockerill in 1955 to form Cockerill-Ougrée.

== History ==
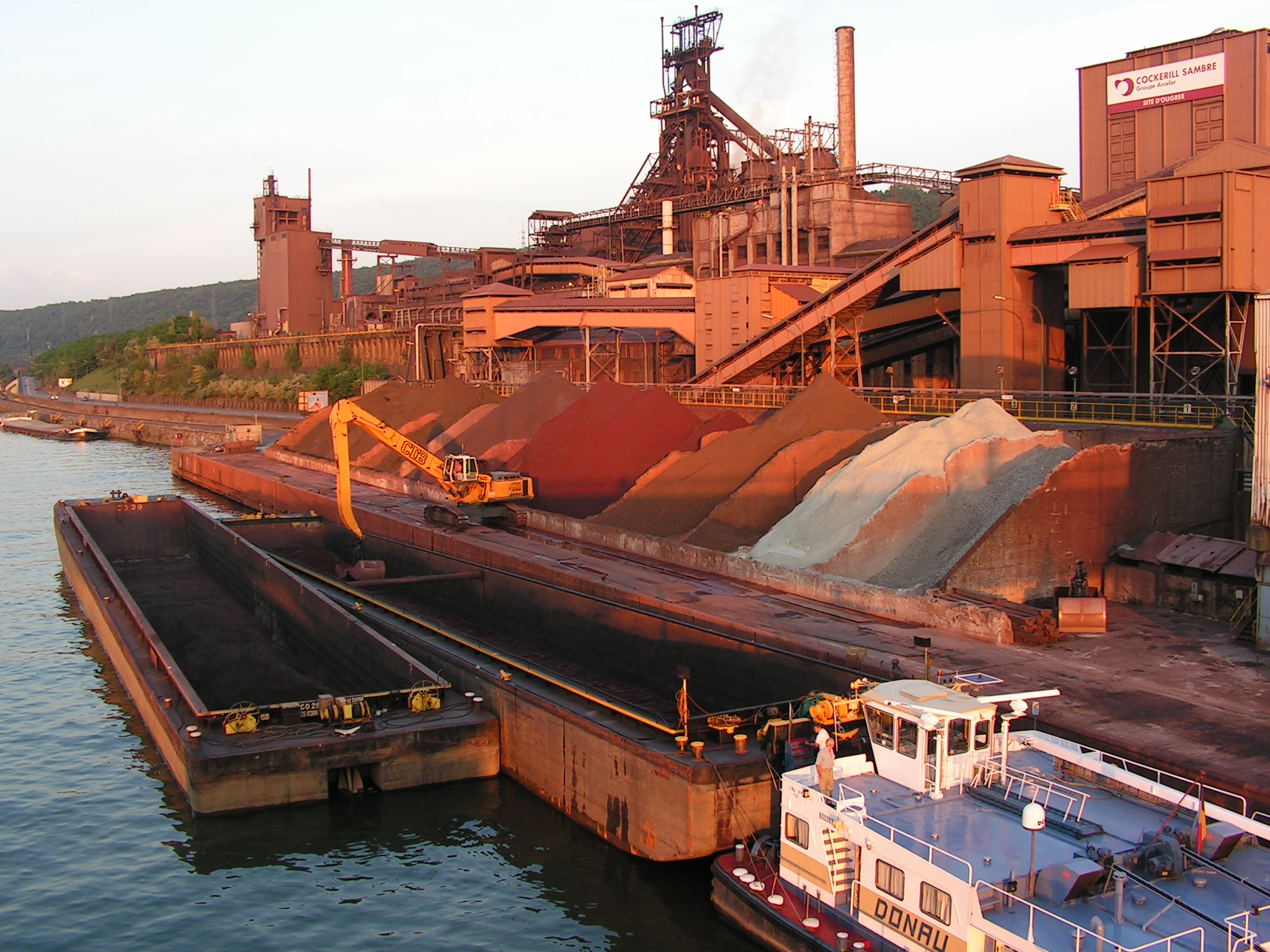
Steelworks in Ougrée and wharf on the river Meuse

In 1809 the Fabrique de Fer d'Ougrée (Note: Actually based in Seraing not Ougrée.) (English: Iron factory of Ougree) was founded, and in 1834 converted into an integrated works. In 1835 the Société des Charbonnages et Hauts-Fourneaux d'Ougrée (English: Coal and blast furnace company of Ougree) was founded.

In 1892 the two companies merged to form the Sociéte anonyme Ougrée, this then merged with the Société des Charbonnages de Marihaye (English: Coal company of Marihaye) in 1900 to form the Sociéte anonym Ougrée-Marihaye.

In 1905 it merged with the Sociéte anonyme des Hauts forneaux de Rodange (Rodange, Luxembourg). In 1929 it took over the SA des Charbonnages de Fontaine-l'Évêque (English: Coal company of Fontaine-l'Évêque), and in 1931 Alliance Monceau based in Monceau-sur-Sambre.

It was one of the primary metal producers in Belgium; by 1914 it operated 8 blast furnaces, and had a steel production capacity of 500,000 tonnes, producing semi and finished products such as bar, plate, beams and rails. German occupation during the First World War brought much damage to the plant at Ougrée, after the war only two blast furnaces were operational; rebuilding took place between 1919 and 1924. Also between 1905 and 1928 the company operated an industrial rack railway at one of its factories in Ougrée.

In 1923 in association with the Société de l'Air Liquide the company founded the Société Belge de l'Azote, based in Ougrée which produced synthetic ammonia. The negative effects of the 1930s depression caused the company to require financial assistance; restructuring followed; in 1936 the company's facilities in Hainaut became a separate company Aciéries et Minières de la Sambre (AMS), (Note: Later to form Thy-Marcinelle et Monceau, a predecessor of Hainaut-Sambre) and in 1937 the Rodange plant became an independent entity as Minière et Métallurgique de Rodange (MMR)

In 1955 the company merged with the Société anonyme John Cockerill to form Cockerill-Ougrée.

=== Legacy ===
The factory in Ougrée became one of the primary hot production sites of the ArcelorMittal Liège division along with works at Seraing and Chertal. Due to the economic downturn caused by the 2008 financial crisis, blast furnace B temporarily stopped production from spring 2009 to April 2010.

In 2011, all liquid steel production in the ArcelorMittal Liège division was ended, resulting in protests, strikes, and the temporary encapsulation of several ArcellorMittal executives as protest against the closure. The company cited overcapacity, and uncompetitiveness as reasons for the closure; a report by Syndex commissioned by trade unions contradicted the claims of un-competitiveness, claiming ArcelorMittal's reports used biased accounting unions officials called for the liegeois steel industry to be taken into ownership outside ArcellorMittal to protect it.
