= National Mining Museum, Luxembourg =

Mining museum in Rumelange, Luxembourg

Coordinates: 49°27′41″N 6°01′36″E

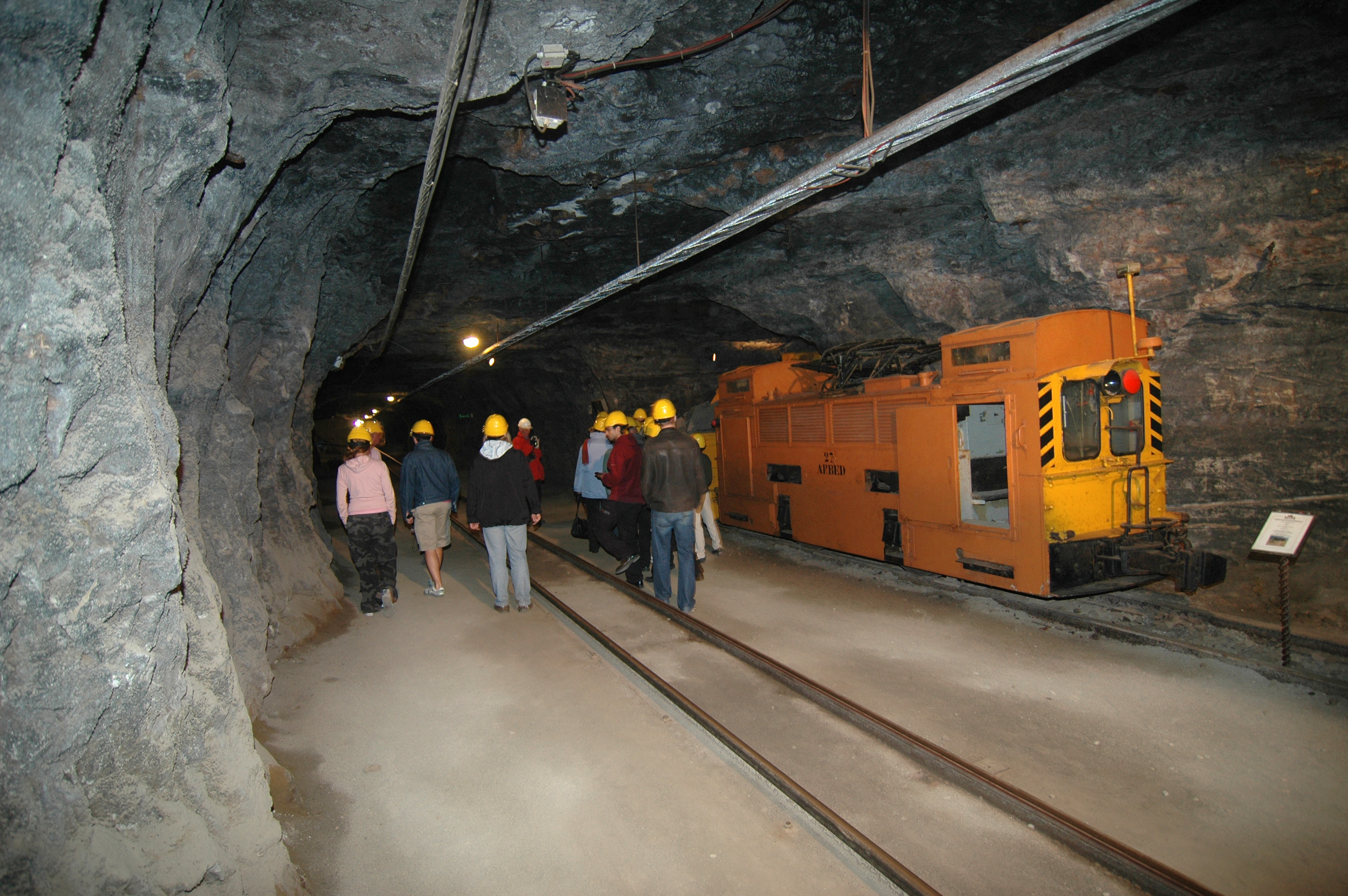
National Mining Museum

The National Mining Museum (French: Musée National des Mines) of Luxembourg is located in the very south of the country, in Rumelange, which is close to the French border. The museum opened in 1973, at the site of the Walert mine. It provides an on-site exhibition of the tools, machinery, and equipment used from the beginning of the 19th century until the iron-ore mines were closed in the 1980s. Many of the exhibits are deep down in the mine.

== The museum ==
The museum is located in the very south of the country, in Rumelange, which is close to the French border, using the galleries of the Walert mine, which had operated for sixty years. There was a fatal accident at the mine site in 1935 when Jean-Pierre Bausch, who had been mayor of Rumelange, died. The museum opened in 1973. The Lonely Planet lists the museum at number twelve on their list of top things to do in Luxembourg.

The National Mining Museum is part of a network of industrial heritage museums. The Minett Tour network is also recognized as a regional route of the European Route of Industrial Heritage (ERIH).

== The collection ==
It provides an on-site exhibition of the tools, machinery, and equipment used from the beginning of the 19th century until the iron-ore mines were closed in the 1980s. Many of the exhibits are deep down in the mine, which can be visited during the summer months. While most of the museum's collection is in the mine, the exhibition hall contains a number of display cases with a selection of lamps, tools, helmets and measuring instruments as well as minerals and fossils. There are also old maps and documents.

The Kirchberg and Walert mine is accessed by train. The rail terminal, 90 metres below the surface, is the start of a 650-metre circuit through tunnels three metres high and from three to five metres wide. Many of the tools are of considerable historical value. The collection includes rare old boring hammers and drilling machines as well as more modern pneumatic drills. The complex array of tunnels also gives an impressive picture of the mine workings.

== Opening times ==
The museum is open in the afternoon on Thursday, Friday, Saturday and Sunday from April to October. In July and August, it is also open on Tuesday and Wednesday afternoons. Special arrangements can be made for groups throughout the year.

== See also ==
- List of museums in Luxembourg
