= Sinter plant =

Equipment to prepare materials for use in a blast furnace

Sinter plants agglomerate iron ore fines (dust) with other fine materials at high temperature, to create a product that can be used in a blast furnace. The final product, a sinter, is a small, irregular nodule of iron mixed with small amounts of other minerals. The process, called sintering, causes the constituent materials to fuse to make a single porous mass with little change in the chemical properties of the ingredients. The purpose of sinter are to be used converting iron into steel.

Sinter plants, in combination with blast furnaces, are also used in non-ferrous smelting. About 70% of the world's primary lead production is still produced this way. The combination was once used in copper smelting, as at the Electrolytic Refining and Smelting smelter in Wollongong, New South Wales.

== History ==
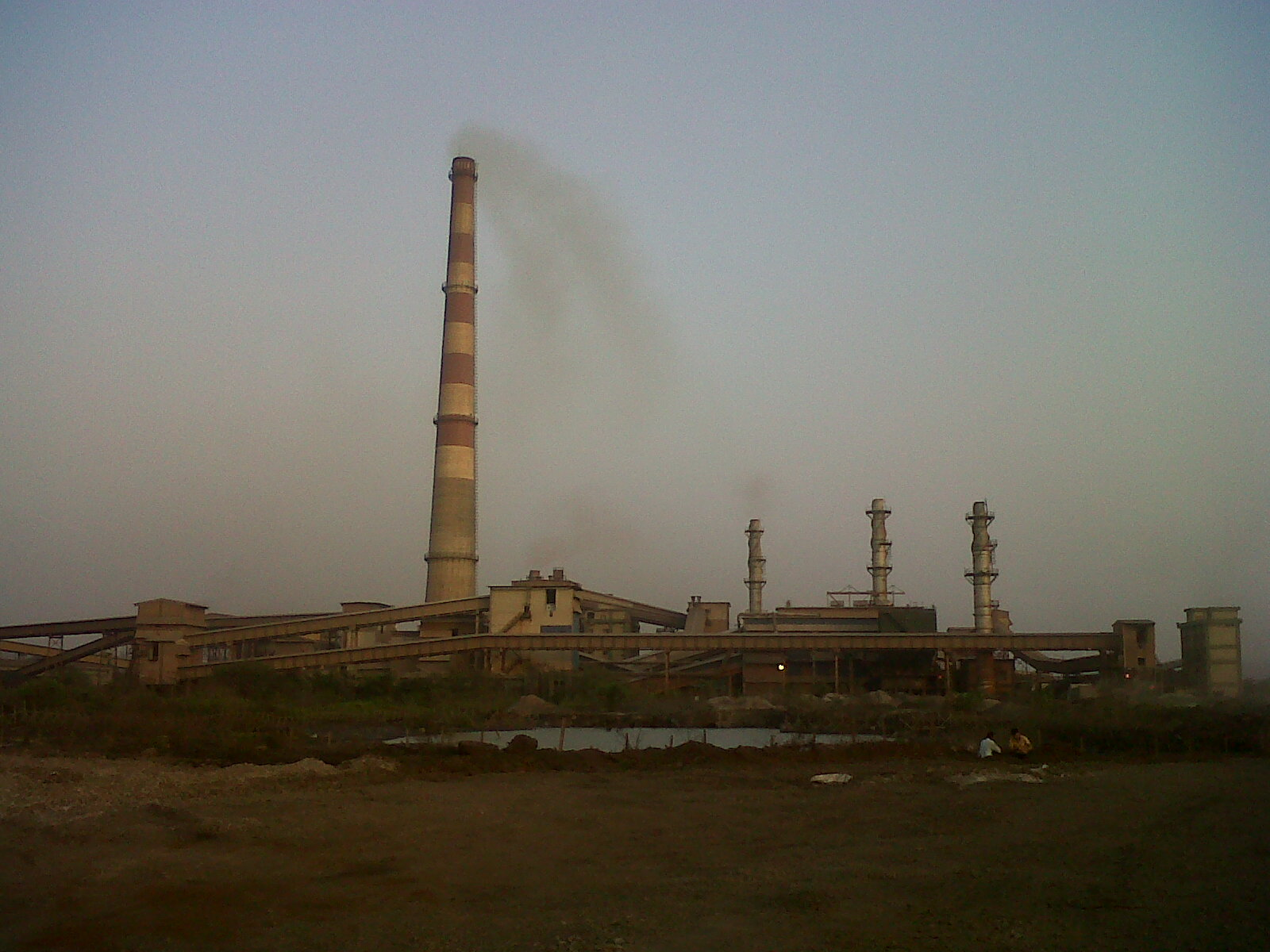
Sinter plant at Ispat Steel, India.

Many countries, including India, France and Germany, have underground deposits of iron ore in dust form (blue dust). Such iron ore cannot be directly charged in a blast furnace. In the early 20th century, sinter technology was developed for converting ore fines into lumpy material chargeable in blast furnaces. Sinter technology took 30 years to gain acceptance in the iron-making domain, but now plays an important role. Initially developed to generate steel, it is now a means of using metallurgical waste generated in steel plants to enhance blast furnace operations and reducing waste. The largest sinter plant is located in Chennai, India, and employs 10,000 people.

== Process ==
=== Preparation of the ores ===
Main feed into a sinter plant is base mix, which consists of iron ore fines, coke fines and flux (limestone) fines. In addition to base mix, coke fines, flux fines, sinter fines, iron dust (collected from plant de-dusting system and electrostatic precipitator) and plant waste are mixed in proportion (by weight) in a rotary drum, often called mixing and nodulizing drum. Calcined lime is used as binder of the mixed material along with water (all in particular proportion by weight) to form feed-sinter of about 5 to 7 mm in size. This sinter globules are fed to sintering machine and burnt therein to produce blast furnace feed sinter.

=== Sintering the materials ===
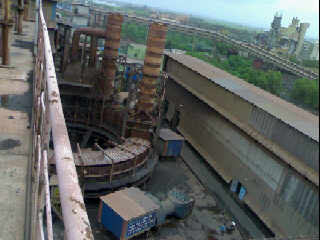
Circle cooler for cooling hot sinter

Material is put on a sinter machine in two layers. The bottom layer may vary in thickness from 30 to 75 millimetres (1.2 to 3.0 in). A 12 to 20 mm sinter fraction is used, also referred to as the hearth layer. The second, covering layer consists of mixed materials, making for a total bed height of 350 to 660 millimetres (14 to 26 in). The mixed materials are applied with drum feeders and roll feeders, which distributes the nodules in certain depth throughout the sintering machine. The upper layer is smoothed using a leveler. The material, also known as a charge, enters the ignition furnace into rows of multi-slit burners. In the case of one plant, the first (ignition) zone has eleven burners. The next (soaking/annealing) zone typically offers 12 burners. Air is sucked from the bottom of the bed of mixed material throughout the sintering machine. Fire penetrates the mixed material gradually, until it reaches the hearth layer. This end point of burning is called burn through point (BTP). The hearth layer, which is nothing but sinter in smaller size, restricts sticking of hot sinter with pallets. BTP is achieved in a certain zone of sinter machine, to optimize the process, by means of several temperature measuring instrument placed throughout the sinter machine. After completion of burning, the mix converts into sinter, which then breaks into smaller size by sinter breaker. After breaking into small sizes, it cools down in cooler (linear or circular) by means of forced air. At discharge of sinter cooler, temperature of sinter is maintained as low, so that the hot sinter can be transported by a conveyor belt made of rubber. Necessary precautions are taken to trace any existence of fire in the belt and necessary extinguishing is done by spraying water. Then this product is being passed through a jaw-crusher, where the size of sinter is further reduced (~ 50 mm) into smaller size. Then the complete mixture is being passed through two screens. Smallest sinter fines (< 5 mm) are stored in proportioning bins and reused for preparing sinter again through mixing and nodulizing drum and fed to sinter machine for burning. A part of the smaller one ( 5 – 20 mm) is used for hearth layer in sinter machine and the rest is taken to the blast furnace along with the biggest sized sinters.

The temperature is typically maintained between 1,150 and 1,250 °C (2,100 and 2,280 °F) in the ignition zone and between 900 and 1000 °C in the soaking zone to prevent sudden quenching of the sintered layer. The top 5 mm from screens goes to the conveyor carrying the sinter for the blast furnace and, along with blast furnace grade sinter, either goes to sinter storage bunkers or to blast furnace bunkers. Blast furnace-grade sinter consists of particles sized 5 to 12 mm as well as 20 mm and above.

== Advantages ==
There are certain advantages of using sinters as opposed to using other materials which include recycling the fines and other waste products, to include flue dust, mill scale, lime dust and sludge. Processing sinter helps eliminate raw flux, which is a binding material used to agglomerate materials, which saves the heating material, coke, and improves furnace productivity.

Improvements and efficiency can be gained from higher softening temperature and narrower softening in the melting zone, which increases the volume of the granular zone and shrinks the width of the cohesive zone. A lower silica content and higher hot metal temperature contributes to more sulphur removal.

== See also ==
- Pelletizing
- Steel
- Steel mill
- Agglomerate (Steel industry)
