= Davignon Plan =

The Davignon Plan was adopted in 1978 by the European Economic Community to reform its steel industry. Its aim was to place a cap on steel's production capacity. In the long term, it aimed to restructure and rationalise the steel industry. Its main tools to achieve its planned targets were state aids and import restrictions.

The Plan took its name from Étienne Davignon, the European Commissioner for the Internal Market and Industrial Affairs.
