= Minette (ore) =

Type of iron ore found in the south of Luxembourg and in Lorraine

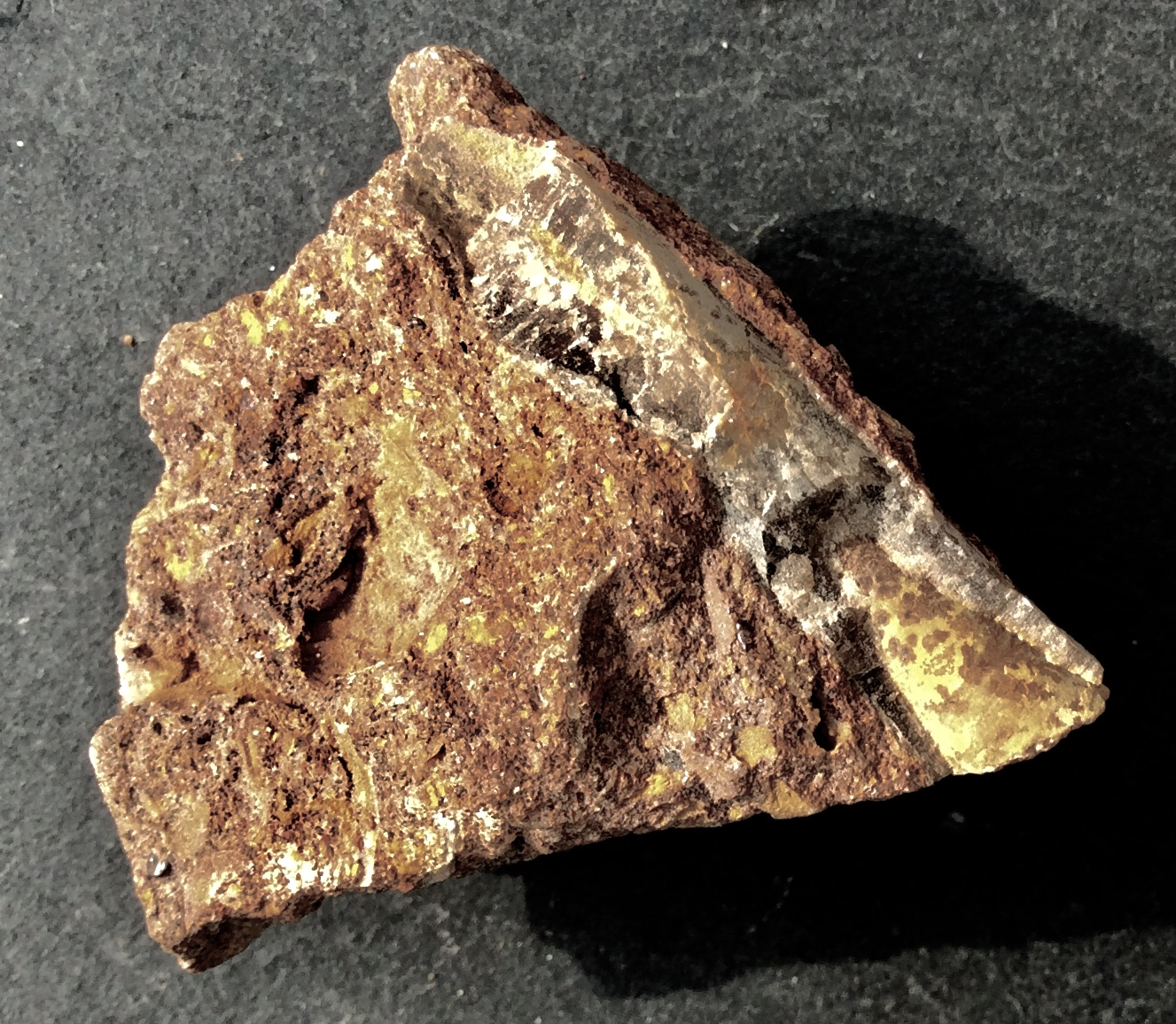
Minette iron ore with belemnite fragment from Rumelange, Luxemburg

Minette is a type of mineral deposit, consisting of iron ore of sedimentary origin, found in the south of Luxembourg and in Lorraine. Minette ore was deposited in the Early Jurassic and Middle Jurassic.

== Etymology ==
The term "minette" came from French miners. It is a diminutive form of "la mine", and might be translated as "little mine, little colliery" or "little vein", referring to its relatively poor iron content of between 28% and 34%.

In other uses, "minette" is also an archaic rock term used to locally describe a particular type of lamprophyre.

== History ==
The deposit is one of the largest iron reserves in the world. The reserves have been estimated at 6 billion tons, with an iron content of 2 billion tons. The phosphorus content of Minette rendered its industrial processing impossible for a long time, which changed with the introduction of the Thomas-Gilchrist procedure.

After the Franco-Prussian War of 1870-1871, large parts of Lorraine were annexed by Germany. The borders were determined such that much of the known Minette reserves were in German territory. The geologist Wilhelm Hauchecorne, a member of the border commission, had argued for this. Although the German authorities awarded significantly more mining concessions than the French had, iron ore production hardly increased until 1879. This changed in the 1880s, due to a greater number of railway lines in the Minette area and the construction of a railway line from Thionville in France to Völklingen in Germany, which from 1883 enabled a direct link with the Saarland industrial area. Explorations in the 1880s showed that the Minette reserves reached further to the West than had previously been assumed, and increased in volume and iron content the deeper they went. By 1909, 16 mines had been dug in the French part of Lorraine, the département Meurthe-et-Moselle, especially in the basin of Briey, which mined Minette through mine shafts.

After World War I, Lorraine belonged completely to France again. In 1919, yearly production went over 41 million tons, 21 million tons of these in the département Moselle and 20 million tons in the département Meurthe-et-Moselle. Lorraine was, after the United States, the second-largest iron producer in the world. The high point of ore production was reached with 62 million tons in France and 6 million tons in Luxembourg in 1960. Currently, after 150 years of mining, approximately 3 billion tons of ore have been produced. The relatively low iron content, however, meant that Lotharingian Minette-ore was successively replaced by more highly concentrated imported ores (with iron contents around 60%). As a consequence, more and more mines were closed down. The last pit in Luxembourg, Differdange, closed in 1981, the last French one, at Audun-le-Tiche in the Moselle department did so in 1997.

== See also ==
- Mining in Luxembourg
