= Gilchrist–Thomas process =

Metallurgical process

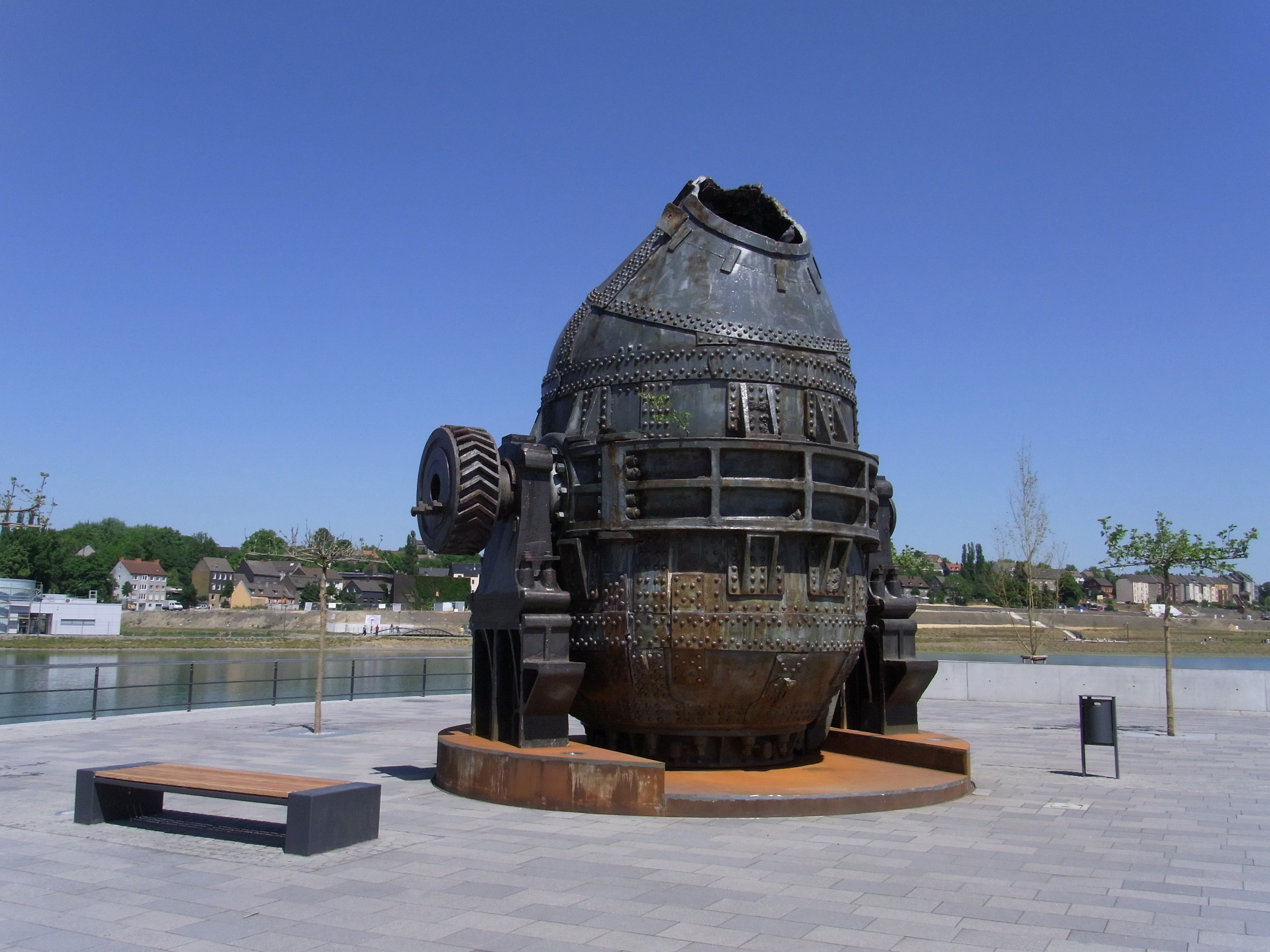
Thomas converter operational from 1954 to 1964, in Dortmund, Germany

The Gilchrist–Thomas process or Thomas process is a historical process for refining pig iron, derived from the Bessemer converter. It is named after its inventors who patented it in 1877: Percy Carlyle Gilchrist and his cousin Sidney Gilchrist Thomas. By allowing the exploitation of phosphorous iron ore, the most abundant, this process allowed the rapid expansion of the steel industry outside the United Kingdom and the United States.

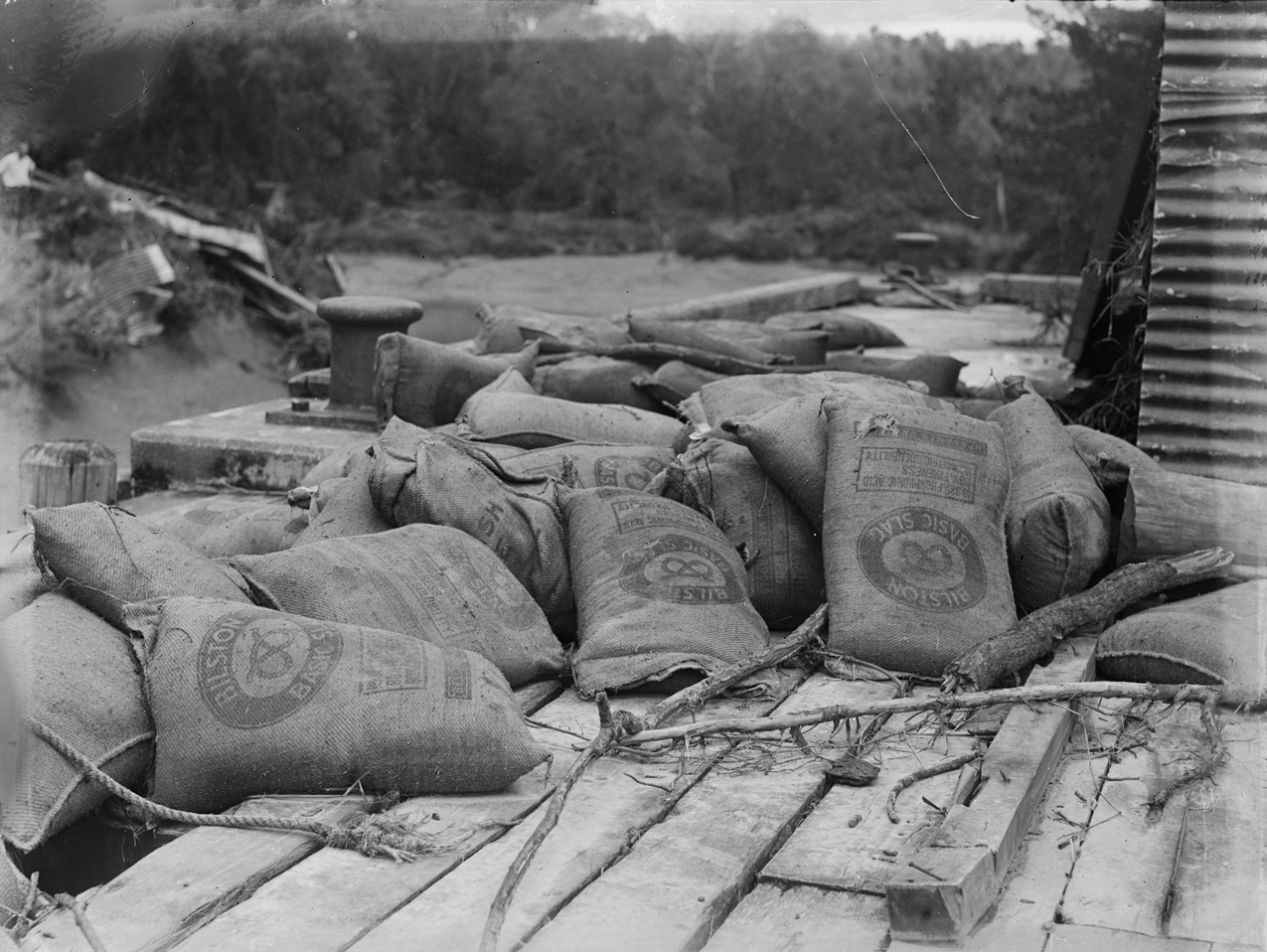
Sacks of 'Bilston Basic Slag' phosphate fertiliser, produced in England and exported to New Zealand in the 1940s

The process differs essentially from the Bessemer process in the refractory lining of the converter. The latter, being made of dolomite ((Ca,Mg)(CO_{3})_{2}) fired with tar, is basic (MgO giving O^{2−} anions), whereas the Bessemer lining, made of packed sand, is acidic (SiO_{2} accepting O^{2−} anions) according to the Lux-Flood theory of molten oxides. Phosphorus, by migrating from liquid iron to molten slag, allows both the production of a steel of satisfactory quality, and of phosphates sought after as fertilizer, known as "Thomas meal". The disadvantages of the basic process includes larger iron loss and more frequent relining of the converter vessel.

After having favored the spectacular growth of the Lorraine iron and steel industry, the process progressively faded away in front of the Siemens-Martin Open-hearth furnace, which also used the benefit of basic refractory lining, before disappearing in the mid-1960s: with the development of gas liquefaction and the cryogenic separation of O_{2} from air, the use of pure oxygen became economically viable. Even if modern pure oxygen converters all operate with a basic medium, their performance and operation have little to do with their ancestor.

== Bibliographic sources ==
- G. Reginald Bashforth, The manufacture of iron and steel, vol. 2: Steel production, London, Chapman & Hall Ltd, 1951, 461 p.
- Thomas Turner (dir.), The metallurgy of iron: By Thomas Turner...: Being one of a series of treatises on metallurgy written by associates of the Royal school of mines, C. Griffin & company, limited, coll. "Griffin's metallurgical series", 1908, 3rd ed., 463 p. ISBN 978-1-177-69287-8
- Walter MacFarlane, The principles and practice of iron and steel manufacture, Longmans, Green, and Co, 1917, 5th ed.
- R.W. Burnie, Memoir and letters of Sidney Gilchrist Thomas, Inventor, John Murray, 1891
- William Tulloch Jeans, The Creators of the Age of Steel, 1884, 356 p. ISBN 978-1-4179-5381-3
- Hermann Wedding (translated from German by: William B. Phillips, Ph.D. & Ernst Prochaska), Wedding's basic Bessemer process ["Basische Bessemer - oder Thomas-Process"], New York Scientific Publishing Company, 1891, 224 p.
- Jean Duflot, Encyclopædia Universalis, "Sidérurgie"
