= Qarmet =

Kazakhstani steelworks and mining company

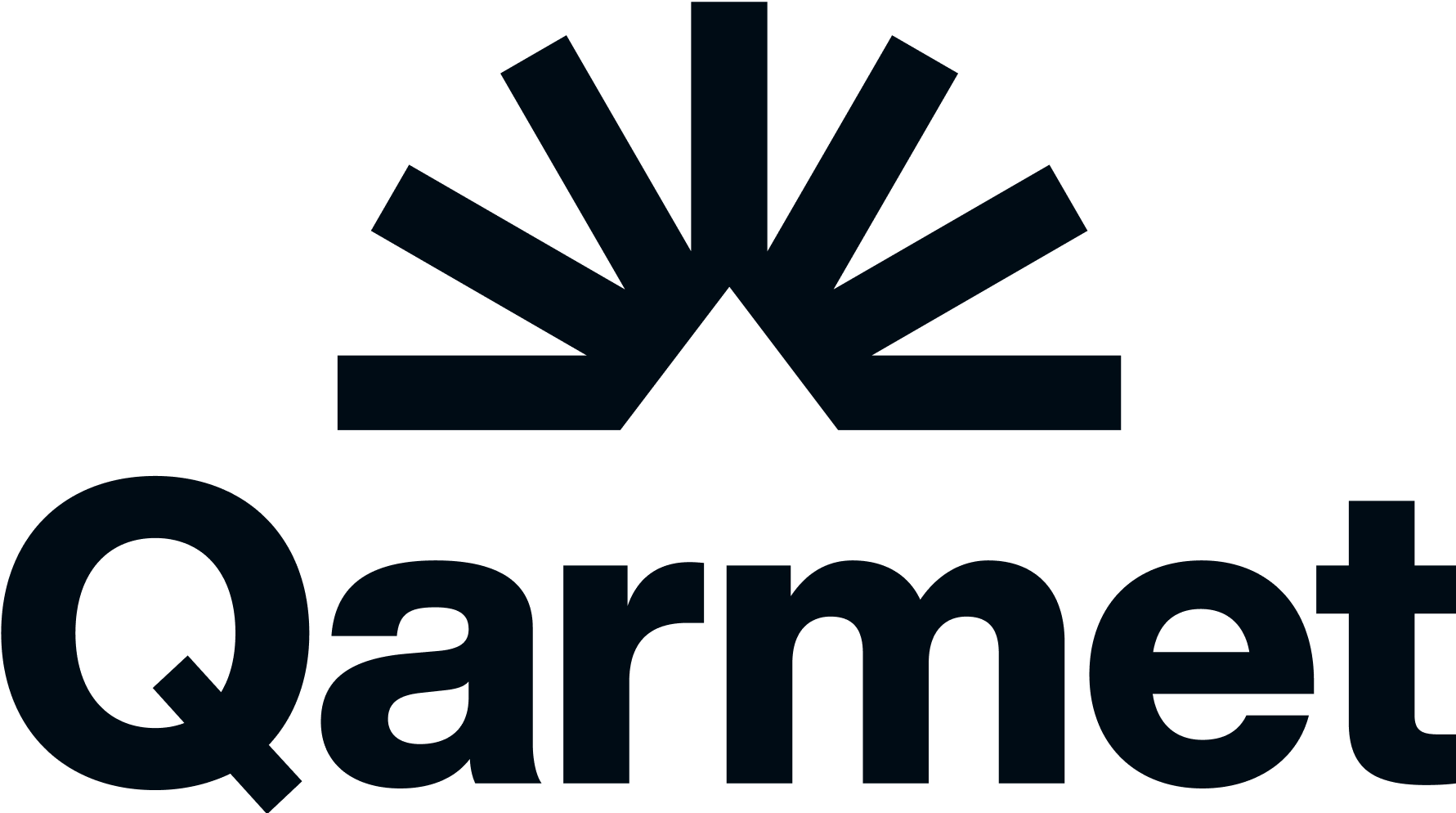
- Formerly: Ispat Karmet (1995–2004); Mittal Steel Temirtau (2004–2007); ArcelorMittal Temirtau (2007–2023)
- Founder: 17 November 1995; 30 years ago
- Headquarters: Temirtau, Kazakhstan
- Key people: Vladimir Yablonsky (acting general director); Viktor Gafiulov (acting production director)
- Parent: Mittal Steel Company (1995–2006); ArcelorMittal (2006–2023); Qazaqstan Investment Corporation (2023–present)

Qarmet, previously known as Ispat Karmet, Mittal Steel Temirtau, and ArcelorMittal Temirtau, is a Kazakhstani integrated steel and mining company that owns the Karaganda Metallurgical Plant in Temirtau, Karaganda Region, the largest steel plant in Kazakhstan. Since December 2023, it is owned by the Qazaqstan Investment Corporation. It was previously owned by the transnational metallurgical group ArcelorMittal. According to the rating agency Expert RA Kazakhstan, ArcelorMittal Temirtau JSC ranked 8th in the list of the largest companies in Kazakhstan in 2015. It is divided into three departments: Steel, Coal and Iron Ore.

== History ==
Logo of ArcelorMittal Temirtau from 2007 to 2023

Ispat Karmet JSC was formed in the mid-1990s by purchasing the Karaganda Metallurgical Plant (GJSC Karmet) at a closed privatization tender by Ispat International, owned by businessman Lakshmi Mittal. Ispat Karmet JSC was renamed as Mittal Steel Temirtau JSC in December 2004, and ArcelorMittal Temirtau JSC on 6 September 2007.

In January 2018, black snow fell in the city of Temirtau, where an ArcelorMittal plant is located. Local citizens complained that the pollution was caused by an ArcelorMittal plant. A spokesperson for ArcelorMittal explained that the discoloration of the snow was caused by a lack of wind which would otherwise blow the pollution away.

On 17 August 2023, a conveyor belt caught fire at the Kazakhstanskaya mine, killing 5 people and a decision was made to transfer the ArcelorMittal Temirtau facilities to state ownership. Two months later, on 28 October, a fire and explosion occurred at another ArcelorMittal Temirtau facility, the Kostenko mine, killing 46 miners. On 8 December, ArcelorMittal sold its Temiritau facilities to the Qazaqstan Investment Corporation. Four days later, ArcelorMittal Temiritau was renamed Qarmet.

On 25 August 2024, two workers died at Qarmet's Temirtau metallurgical plant due to safety lapses while working at height, and a commission was formed to investigate.
