= ArcelorMittal =

Luxembourgish steel manufacturing corporation

ArcelorMittal S.A.

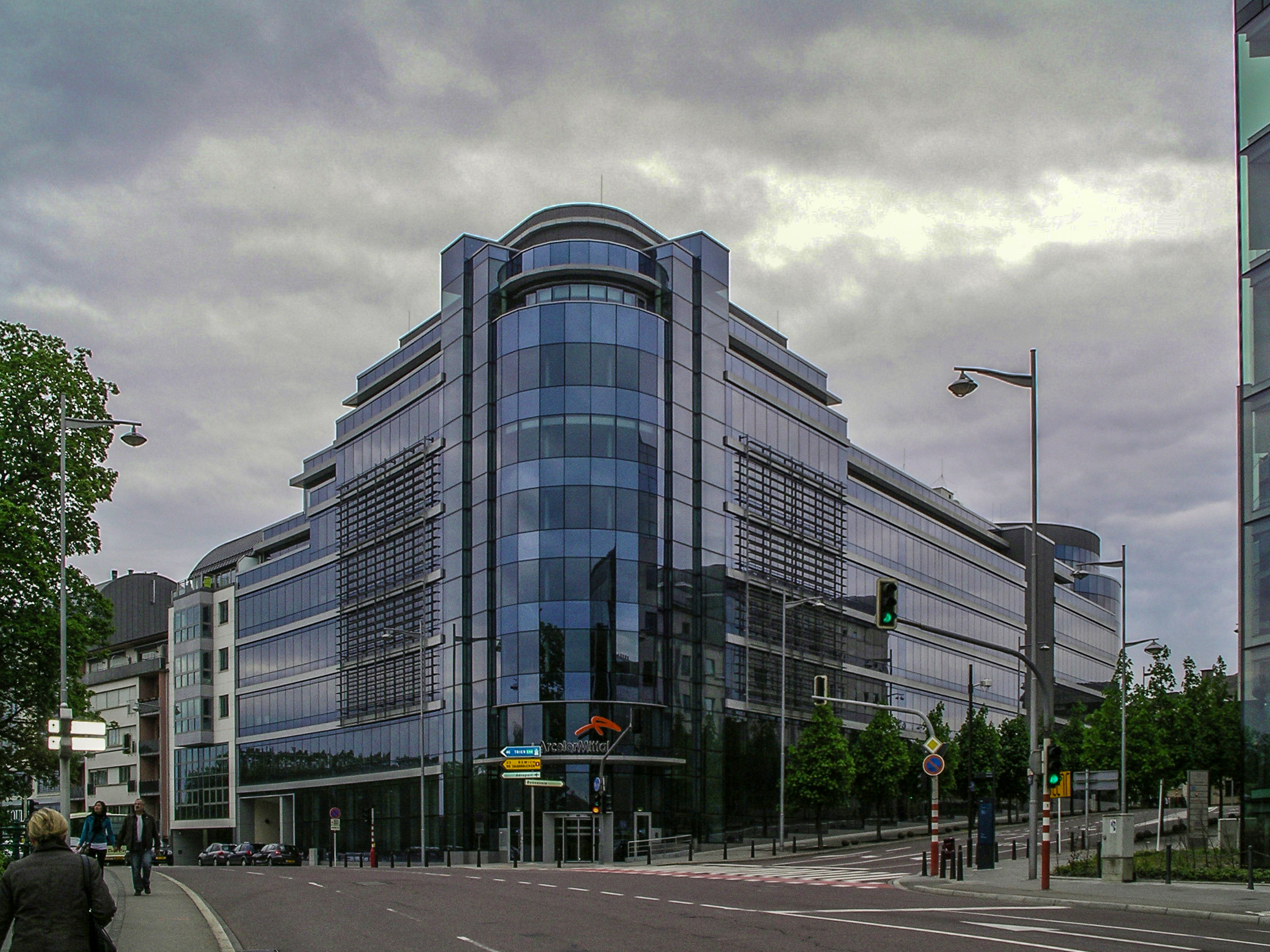
- ArcelorMittal headquarters in Luxembourg City
- Type: Public
- Traded as: Euronext Amsterdam: MT; NYSE: MT; CAC 40 component; AEX component
- ISIN: LU1598757687
- Industry: Steel industry
- Predecessors: Arcelor; Mittal Steel Company
- Founded: 2007; 19 years ago
- Headquarters: Luxembourg City, Luxembourg
- Area served: Worldwide
- Key people: Aditya Mittal (CEO); Lakshmi Mittal (executive chairperson); Karel De Gucht (Director); Etienne Schneider (Director); Patricia Barbizet (Director)
- Products: Steel, flat steel products, long steel products, wire products, plates
- Revenue: ▼US$61.352 billion (2025)
- Operating income: ▲US$3.628 billion (2025)
- Net income: ▲US$3.152 billion (2025)
- Total assets: ▲US$97.703 billion (2025)
- Total equity: ▲US$54.466 billion (2025)
- Owner: Lakshmi Mittal and his family (44.68%)
- Number of employees: 125,554 (2025)
- Subsidiaries: Disteel, Dofasco, Creusot-Loire, Essar Steel, ARBED, ALZ (steelworks), Arcelor
- Website: corporate.arcelormittal.com

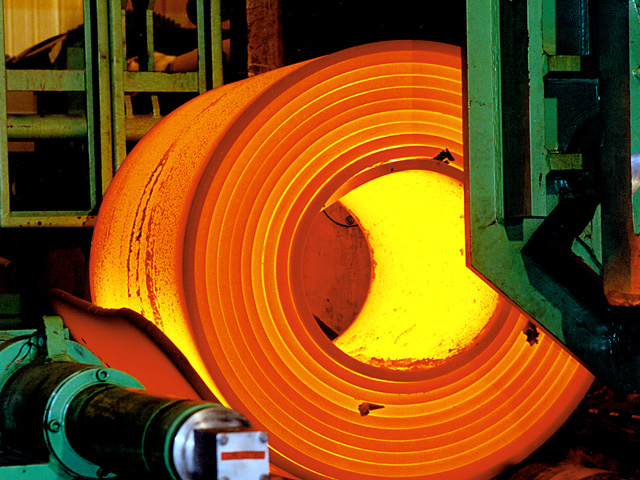
Steel being coiled at an ArcelorMittal facility in Brazil

ArcelorMittal S.A., headquartered in Luxembourg City, is a multinational steel manufacturing corporation, with operations in iron ore and coke mining as well as scrap recycling. It is the second-largest steelmaker worldwide behind Baowu and was the largest steelmaker worldwide until 2019, when Baowu acquired other Chinese steelmakers.

ArcelorMittal has steel-making operations in 14 countries, including 34 integrated and mini-mill steel-making facilities. In 2025, the company had production capacity of 74.6 million tons of steel and produced 55.6 million tons of steel. The company's production was 40% in the Americas, 53% in Europe and 7% in other countries, such as South Africa and Ukraine. The company is vertically integrated and produces 72% of its iron ore needs from mining operations, 91% of its coke needs, and 55% of its scrap and direct reduced iron needs. The company is ranked 190th on the Fortune Global 500 and 256th on the Forbes Global 2000. As of December 2025, the company was 44.68% owned by Lakshmi Mittal and his family and the remainder of the company is publicly traded.

The company has iron ore mining activities in Brazil, Canada, Liberia, Mexico, Ukraine, South Africa and, via its joint venture in India and associate in Baffinland in Canada. The company's market share in the production of steel for the automotive industry is 16%.

== History ==
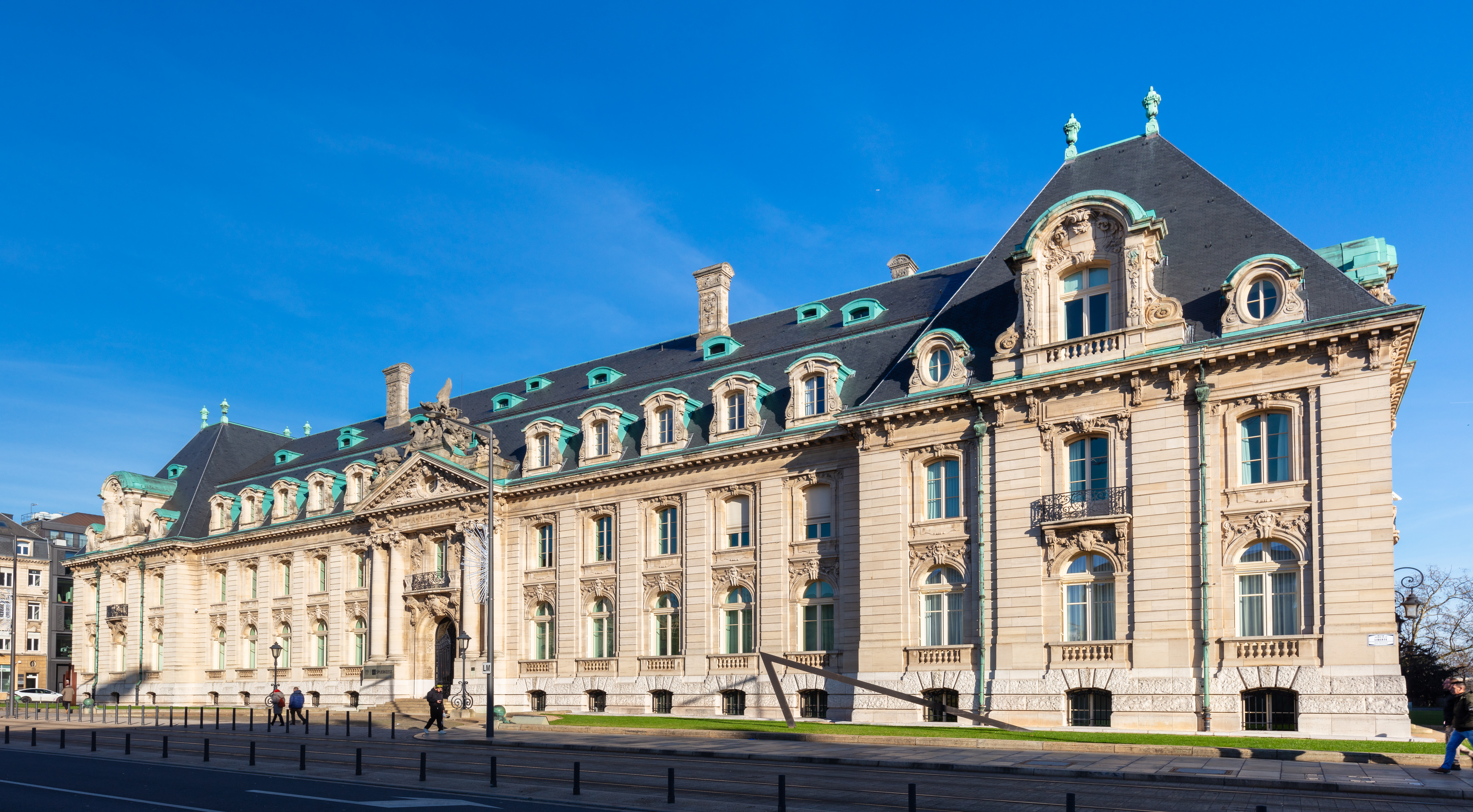
ArcelorMittal's former headquarters in Luxembourg, popularly known as the ARBED building

ArcelorMittal was formed in 2007 from the $33 billion acquisition of Arcelor by Mittal Steel Company. The merger was consummated after Mittal Steel Company raised its bid for Arcelor and the Mittal family agreed to relinquish its controlling stake in the company and execute a standstill agreement not to acquire a controlling interest without approval from independent directors. The resulting firm produced approximately 10% of the world's steel, and was at that time the largest steel company worldwide.

In August 2007, the company acquired Sicartsa, operator of a plant in Mexico, from Grupo Villacero for $1.44 billion. In October 2007, the company acquired 90% of Rongcheng Chengshan Steelcord, a Chinese steel wire company, for $26.6 million. In November 2007, the company increased its stake in China Oriental Group to over 73%, becoming the first foreign company to control a steel mill in China.

In April 2008, the company, in partnership with its joint venture partner Nippon Steel announced a $240 million investment to double galvanized production capacity at their I/N Kote with the addition of a new $240-million continuous galvanizing line. In December 2008, the company sold the Bethlehem Steel plant in Lackawanna, New York and the Sparrows Point Mill to Severstal, to satisfy conditions for regulatory approval of the merger with Arcelor. In December 2008, during the Great Recession, the company closed its steel mill in Hennepin, Illinois; it was demolished in 2017. In July 2009, the company acquired Noble's European Laser Welded Operations as part of the bankruptcy of Noble International.

In January 2011, the company completed the corporate spin-off of its stainless steel division, Aperam. In April 2011, the European Commission fined 17 steel producers for operating a cartel for the period of 1984 to 2002; ArcelorMittal received the largest fine of €45.7 million.

In May 2012, the company sold Skyline Steel and Astralloy to Nucor for $605 million. In July 2012, due to overcapacity and reduced demand in Europe, it had idled 9 of 25 blast furnaces. In October 2012, it permanently shut down two blast furnaces in Florange, France. However, it revived them two months later when it agreed with the French government on a substantial investment.

In May 2013, the company sold a 15% interest in its Labrador Trough iron ore mining and infrastructure asset to Posco and China Steel for $1.1 billion.

In February 2014, ThyssenKrupp sold its carbon steel facility in Calvert, Alabama, to ArcelorMittal and Nippon Steel for $1.55 billion. The facility was renamed AM/NS Calvert through the 50/50 joint partnership with Nippon Steel & Sumitomo Metal Corp. In June 2025, to gain approval for the acquisition of U.S. Steel by Nippon Steel, Nippon Steel sold its 50% stake in the facility to ArcelorMittal for $1 and the facility was renamed ArcelorMittal Calvert.

In June 2014, the arbitration court of the International Chamber of Commerce awarded Senegal $150 million from the company and allowed the government of Senegal to rescind a $2.2 billion contract given to the company to develop an iron ore deposit and construct a 750 km (466 mi) railway line after the company stalled on construction. In September 2014, ArcelorMittal and Gerdau sold Gallatin Steel to Nucor for $770 million.

In February 2016, the company sold its 35% stake in Gestamp Automacion to the Riberas family for €875 million. In June 2016, the company released Usibor 2000, a steel grade that was said to be one-third stronger than other steels then available for car-making.

In August 2016, after an investigation that began in 2008, the Competition Commission (South Africa) found the company guilty of price fixing for the period of January 1984 to September 2002 and fined the company 1.5 billion South African rand (US$110.9 million). The company also agreed to invest R4.64 billion rand in capital expenditures in capital over five years.

In February 2017, ArcelorMittal and Votorantim announced plans to combine their long steel operations in Brazil. Under the deal, Votorantim Siderurgia became a subsidiary of ArcelorMittal Brasil. In 2017, ArcelorMittal and the Steel Authority of India Ltd (SAIL) agreed on preliminary terms to form a $913 million joint venture to export a fifth of the auto-grade steel made by the venture. In March 2017, the company proposed a US$6.5 billion steel project in Karnataka, after entering into a pact with the Karnataka government in February 2017. In April 2017, the company sold Georgetown Steelworks in South Carolina to Sanjeev Gupta's Liberty House Group.

In January 2018, black snow fell in the city of Temirtau, Kazakhstan, where an ArcelorMittal plant was located, which locals blamed on the plant. The company claimed that the discoloration of the snow was caused by a lack of wind which would otherwise blow the pollution away. In July 2018, the Indiana Occupational Safety and Health Administration found five serious safety violations at the company's Indiana Harbor steel mill in East Chicago after the death of a steelworker while driving a golf cart at the facility with faulty brakes. The company was fined $21,000.

In November 2018, a consortium led by ArcelorMittal acquired Ilva, owner of the Taranto steelworks in southern Italy, which has Europe's largest steel output, for €1.8 billion. To receive approval, the consortium agreed to invest €2.4 billion into Ilva, renamed ArcelorMittal Italia, while the state agreed to invest €2 billion. ArcelorMittal accused the state of not investing the agreed-upon amount and, in February 2024, Italy's industry minister took control of the venture in a manner similar to a bankruptcy, after an increase in energy prices and a drop in rolled steel coil prices led the venture to accumulate huge debts.

In March 2019, the company, in partnership with Nippon Steel, acquired Essar Steel, which had filed for bankruptcy protection. In July 2019, the company sold seven major steelworks and five service centers in seven European countries to Sanjeev Gupta's Liberty House Group. In August 2019, the company took over management of Hibbing Taconite, of which it owns 62.3%, from Cleveland-Cliffs. Also in August 2019, the company acquired Legault Métal.

In December 2020, the company sold ArcelorMittal USA, which had 2019 revenues of $17 billion, to Cleveland-Cliffs for approximately $1.4 billion. In March 2022, the company acquired John Lawrie Metals, a metals recycler in Scotland. In May 2022, the company acquired 10 scrap yards in the south of Germany. In July 2022, the company acquired an 80% interest in Voestalpine's hot-briquetted iron plant near Corpus Christi, Texas, based on a $1 billion valuation. In December 2022, the company acquired Riwald Recycling. In September 2022, the company closed two plants in Germany, including a blast furnace in Bremen and a wire-rod plant in Hamburg due to increased costs for electricity and natural gas.

In March 2023, the company acquired Companhia Siderúrgica do Pecém, owner of a 3-million-metric-ton blast furnace and slab plant in northeastern Brazil, for $2.2 billion. In April 2023, the company's joint venture with Nippon Steel acquired Indian Steel Corporation, which had filed for bankruptcy protection. In December 2023, after the Kostenko mine disaster, the company sold its assets in Kazakhstan, the Temirtau steel mill and the Aktau pipe plant, for $286 million to a Kazakh state-owned investment fund. In 2023, the company spent $23 million to buy 3 cargoes of coal from Russian companies despite international sanctions during the Russian invasion of Ukraine. The action was criticized by Global Witness, which noted that the company has operations in Ukraine.

In August 2024, ArcelorMittal acquired a 27.5% interest in Vallourec, a producer of seamless steel tubes, from funds managed by Apollo Global Management for €955 million.

In January 2025, the company's South Africa division ended production of long steel products due to high logistic and energy costs. In March 2025, after being sued by 300 local residents and environmental groups, the company was placed under judicial supervision, subject to a €250,000 bail bond and a €1.75 million bank guarantee, for pollutants discharged by its steel plant at Fos-sur-Mer, which has an annual production capacity of 4 million tons of steel. The company claimed that it has reduced pollution at the plant by 70% since 2002. In July 2025, the company closed a wire mill in Hamilton, Ontario, affecting 153 jobs. In September 2025, the company ceased operations at Hunedoara steel works in Hunedoara, Romania due to high energy costs and reduced orders, affecting 477 jobs; the mill was sold to UMB Grup in April 2026 for €12.5 million plus VAT. In October 2025, the company sold its operations in Bosnia.

In April 2026, the company donated steel for the White House State Ballroom. The company had previously been listed as one of the donors who funded the White House's East Wing demolition and planned building of the ballroom. In May 2026, the company sold a 10% interest in Vallourec for $667 million. In June 2026, the company announced a $57 million investment to establish the North American headquarters of ArcelorMittal Building Solutions in Macon-Bibb County.

== Predecessor companies ==
Acquired by Mittal Steel Company:

- International Steel Group (acquired 2004)
  - Bethlehem Steel – United States (acquired 2003)
    - Lukens Steel Company – United States (acquired 1997)
    - Pennsylvania Steel Company – United States (acquired 1917)
  - ISG Weirton Steel – United States (acquired 2002)
  - Ling-Temco-Vought – United States (acquired 2002)
    - Republic Steel – United States (acquired 1984)
    - Jones and Laughlin Steel – United States (acquired 1984)
  - Acme Steel – Chicago, US (acquired 2002)
- Ispat International (later Mittal Steel Company) (acquired 2004)
  - Inland Steel Company – United States (acquired 1998)
- ArcelorMittal Kryvyi Rih – Ukraine (acquired 2005)

Acquired by Arcelor:

- Aceralia – Spain (merger 2001)
- Usinor – France (merger 2001)
  - Acesita – Brazil (acquired 1998)
- ARBED – Luxembourg (merger 2001)
- Acindar – Argentina (acquired 2006)
- Dofasco – Canada (acquired March 2006)

== Facilities ==
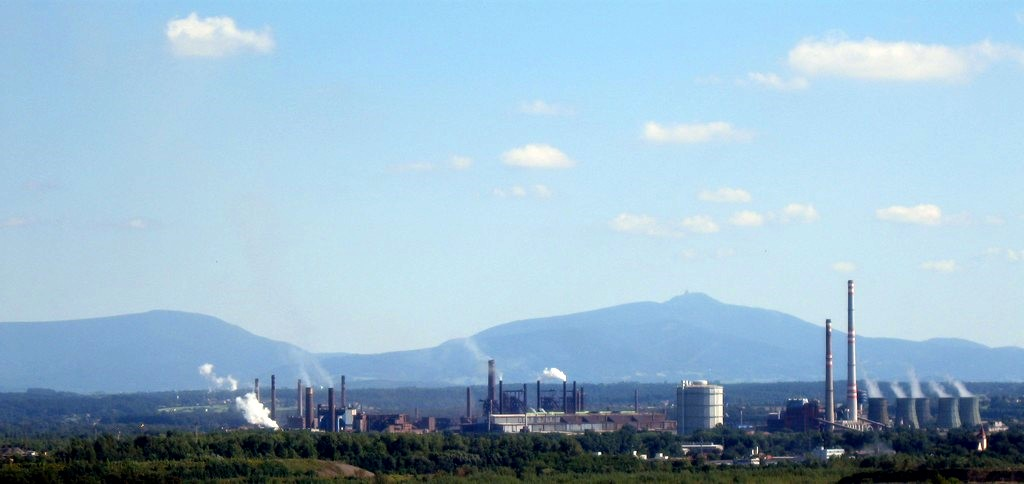
ArcelorMittal Ostrava

Operated by ArcelorMittal:

- ArcelorMittal Ghent – Zelzate, plants in Geel, Genk and Liège, Belgium
- Plant in Dunkerque, Desvres, Fos-sur-Mer, Mardyck, Montataire, Basse-Indre, Florange, Mouzon, Saint-Chély-d'Apcher, France
- Plants in Bremen and Eisenhüttenstadt, Duisburg Germany
- ArcelorMittal Mexico – plant in Lázaro Cárdenas, Michoacán, Mexico
- Katowice Steelworks – Dąbrowa Górnicza, Tadeusz Sendzimir Steelworks in Kraków, Sosnowiec, Swietochlowice, Chorzów, Zdzieszowice, Poland
- Hunedoara steel works – Hunedoara (shutdown)
- ArcelorMittal Spain, plants in Avilés and Gijón, Etxebarri, Lesaka and Legasa, Sagunto and Sestao (part of Greater Bilbao), Bergara, Olaberria
- Plant in Belval, Esch-sur-Alzette, Differdange and Rodange, Luxemburg
- Dofasco – Hamilton, Ontario, Canada
- Acindar – Villa Constitución, Argentina
- Hibbing Taconite (62.3% interest) – Hibbing, Minnesota, United States
- Vanderbijlpark, South Africa
- ArcelorMittal Aços Longos – Brazil
- AM/NS Calvert – Calvert, Alabama, United States

Formerly active:

- ArcelorMittal Kryvyi Rih in Kryvyi Rih, Ukraine

Joint ventures:

- Essar Steel (AM/NS India) – Hazira (joint venture with Nippon Steel)
- Annaba steel complex – Annaba, Algeria (49% interest, joint venture with Sidar)
- Ouenza and Boukhadra mines – Algeria (49% interest, joint venture with Sidar)

== Finances ==
	2016	2017	2018	2019	2020	2021	2022	2023	2024	2025
Total revenue (USD bn)	56.8	68.7	76.0	70.6	53.3	76.6	79.8	68.3	62.4	61.3
Operating profit (USD bn)	3.1	5.3	7.0	1.7	2.5	16.7	11.7	3.1	3.4	1.7
Net profit (USD bn)	1.8	4.6	5.2	-2.5	-0.7	15.0	9.3	0.9	1.3	3.2
Total assets (USD bn)	75.1	85.3	91.3	87.9	82.1	90.5	94.6	93.9	89.4	97.7
Total equity (USD bn)	32.3	40.9	44.1	40.5	40.2	51.3	55.6	56.1	51.3	56.4
Employees	198,517	197,108	208,583	191,248	168,000	158,000	154,352	126,756	125,416	125,554

== See also ==
- ArcelorMittal Orbit (building sponsored by chairman)
- Economy of Belo Horizonte
- List of steel producers
- Steel industry in Luxembourg
