= Sparrows Point, Maryland =

Unincorporated community in Maryland, United States

- Unincorporated area
- Location within Maryland Location within the United States
- Coordinates: 39°13′9″N 76°28′34″W
- Country: United States
- State: Maryland
- County: Baltimore
- Time zone: UTC-5 (Eastern (EST))
  - Summer (DST): UTC-4 (EDT)
- ZIP code: 21219
- GNIS feature ID: 591325

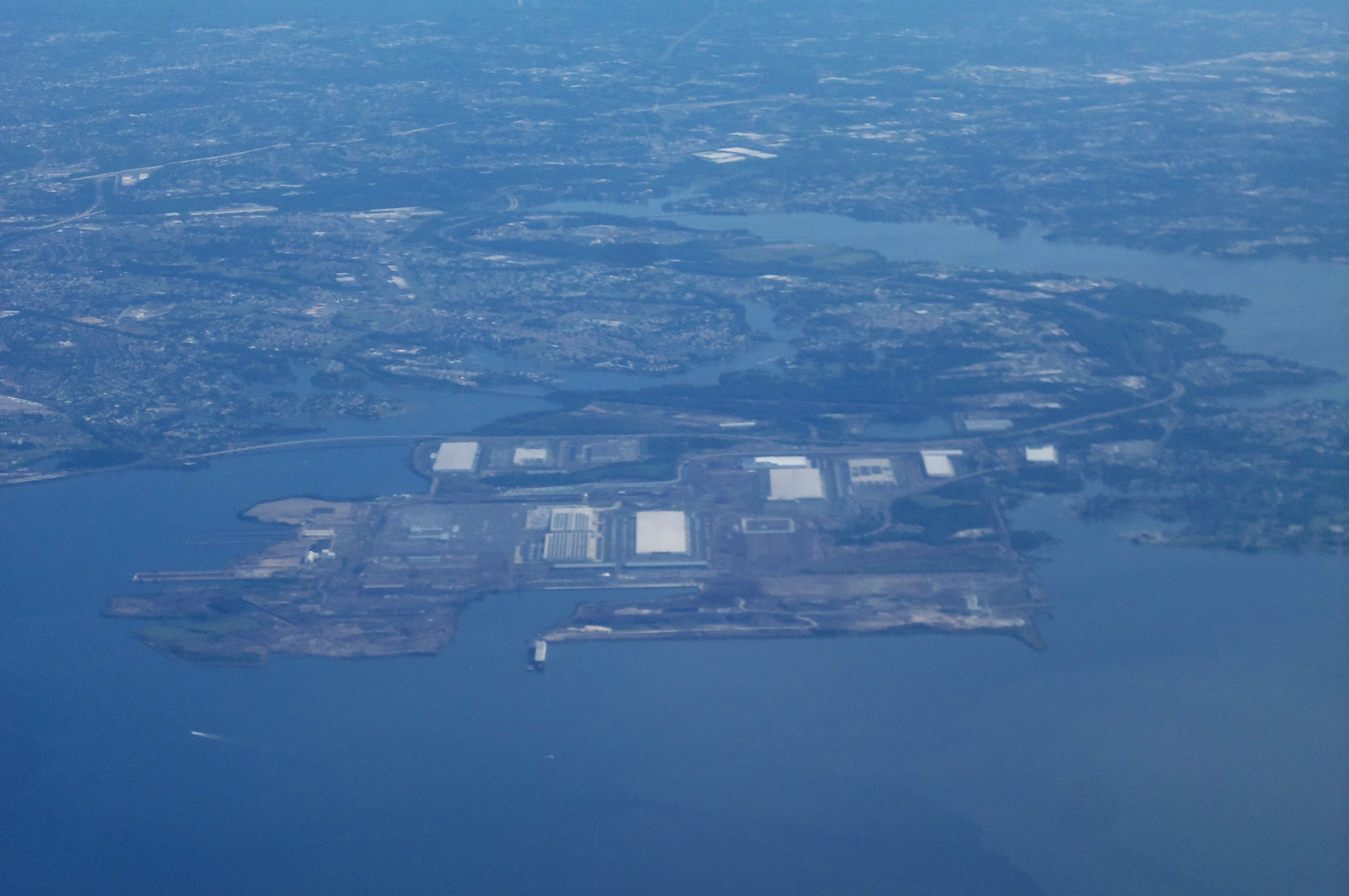
Sparrows Point in 2021

Sparrows Point is an industrial area in unincorporated Baltimore County, Maryland, United States, adjacent to Edgemere. Named after Thomas Sparrow, landowner, it was the site of a very large industrial complex owned by Bethlehem Steel, known for steelmaking and shipbuilding. In its heyday in the mid-20th century, it was the largest steel mill in the world. The site of the former Bethlehem Sparrows Point Shipyard and steel mill is now renamed Tradepoint Atlantic in a revitalization program to clean up the environment and make it one of the largest ports on the East Coast of the United States. Today Sparrows Point is home to many distribution centers, fulfillment centers, training lots, storage lots, and the like, including those operated by Under Armour, Amazon, Home Depot, Volkswagen, and McCormick & Company. In October 2026, Anduril and the United States Department of Defense announced construction of a new shipbuilding site. Journalists have stated this would be the largest job creation project in Maryland in over a decade.

== History ==
Sparrows Point was originally marshland home to Native American tribes until being granted to one Thomas Sparrow Jr. (1620 - 1674) by Cecilius Calvert, 2nd Baron Baltimore, around 1652. His son Solomon Sparrow made a home there, calling it "Sparrow's Nest". In the 1700s the area became home to other families, who farmed and raised crops, building homes and hunting lodges. Among the many wealthy residents of Baltimore who owned property there was Major General George H. Steuart, who hosted the social reformer Dorothea Dix at Sparrows Point. By the 1860s much of the land, about 385 acres (156 ha), was owned by the Fitzell family.

Sparrows Point remained largely rural until 1887, when an engineer named Frederick Wood realized that the marshy inlet would make an excellent deep-water port for the Pennsylvania Steel Company. The Fitzells were reluctant to part with their peach orchards but were eventually persuaded to sell.

Following World War II, many rural economic migrants settled in Sparrows Point, coming from Southern and Appalachian states. These migrants came to work at the Bethlehem Steel plant. Many of these workers were from rural areas and mining towns of West Virginia and Central Pennsylvania.

=== Steel ===
Steel was first made at Sparrows Point in 1889 by the Maryland Steel Company, a subsidiary of the Pennsylvania Steel Company.

==== 20th century ====
In 1916, Bethlehem Steel Corporation of Bethlehem, Pennsylvania, purchased the mill. The mill's steel was used as girders in the Golden Gate Bridge and in cables for the George Washington Bridge, and was a vital part of war production during World War I and World War II. The mill was served by four railroads: the Western Maryland, Pennsylvania, Baltimore & Ohio, and the local Patapsco & Back River Railroad, which was responsible for yard work.

In the mid-1950s, the plant operated 10 blast furnaces and had a rated capacity of 8,200,000 short tons (7,321,000 long tons; 7,439,000 t) of ingot steel per year, making the Sparrows Point waterfront plant the largest steel mill in the world at the time, stretching 4 miles (6.4 km) from end to end and employing 30,000 workers. Most of the iron ore consumed at the plant came via ship, imported from mines in South America and Labrador. Limestone and coal was brought in from Pennsylvania, Kentucky, and West Virginia via rail. Steel was produced in 35 open hearth furnaces and cast into ingots, which were then reheated in soaking pits to be rolled into blooms or slabs via a large reversing rolling mill. Blooms were then rolled into long products like welded pipe, rebar, wire products, and nails. Slabs were rolled into sheets in a continuous rolling mill and plate in a reversing mill. The facility also featured a 66" cold rolling mill, a galvanizing line, and a tinplating line for sheet products. Additionally, the plant's coke ovens were also set up to capture certain coke byproducts like tar and toluene for resale.

Changes in the steel industry over the following decades, including a rise in imports and a move toward the use of simpler oxygen furnaces and the recycling of scrap, along with the intrinsically time and labor-intensive process of open-hearth steelmaking, led to a decline in the use of the Sparrows Point complex during the 1970s and 1980s.

From 1984 through 1986, an effort to modernize resulted in the successful installation of a basic oxygen furnace (BOF), continuous caster and supporting management information systems. However, this effort to save the plant and Bethlehem Steel was, perhaps, too little too late.

==== 21st century ====
In 2005, the Sparrows Point plant was acquired by Mittal Steel Company as part of its acquisition of Bethlehem Steel's successor company International Steel Group after Bethlehem Steel's bankruptcy.

In March 2008, Mittal Steel Company sold the plant to Severstal for $810 million. By 2008, the steelmaking capacity at Sparrows Point had dropped to 3.6 million tons per year, and it sold 2.3 millions tons of finished products.

In 2012, the Sparrows Point steel mill was purchased along with other mills in Ohio and West Virginia by Ira Rennert's Renco Group for $1.2 billion. This made Renco the fifth owner in the past ten years. RG Steel, LLC, a unit of Renco, ran the facility until it filed for bankruptcy on May 31, 2012.

The Sparrows Point steel mill was purchased by Hilco Trading during RG Steel's liquidation in August 2012, and the cold mill assets were purchased by Nucor, who in 2012 and 2013 dismantled the cold mill, intending to use its parts to support their existing sheet mills.

In September 2014, the 3,100-acre (1,300 ha) property was purchased by Sparrows Point Terminal, LLC (SPT). SPT entered into agreements with the Maryland Department of the Environment (MDE) and the EPA, under which SPT agreed to develop and execute plans to complete the environmental cleanup of the site.

The agreements require SPT to establish a $43 million trust fund and provide MDE with a $5 million letter of credit to ensure that the cleanup work is completed, but the company remains obligated to complete the remediation work in accordance with those agreements, even if the cost exceeds $48 million. SPT also agreed to provide the EPA with $3 million to perform additional offshore investigation and, if necessary, offshore remediation. Both the purchase of the property by SPT and the company's agreements with MDE and USEPA were hailed by government and business leaders as a positive turning point for Sparrows Point. Maryland's Secretary of the Environment, Robert M. Summers, described the agreements as providing a "clear path to completion" of the environmental cleanup and an "extraordinary level of protection for the environment and public health." Viewing the environmental cleanup as the first step toward major economic revitalization for Sparrows Point and the surrounding region, Baltimore County Executive Kevin B. Kamenetz stated that "the future for returning thousands of family-supporting jobs to Sparrows Point looks brighter than it has in many decades." According to one of SPT's executives, the company's plans for redevelopment include transforming the site into "one of the largest ports on the East Coast".

In September, 2018, Amazon opened a fulfillment center on the property as part of the Tradepoint Atlantic industrial complex. In 2020 it opened a second fulfillment center next door.

In July, 2020 Volkswagen Group of America opened its port operations in Sparrows Point. At this location, the Volkswagen Group imports vehicles for the Volkswagen, Audi, Bentley, Lamborghini and Porsche Brands. The facility serves the mid-atlantic area and supports over 300 dealerships from North Carolina to Michigan and up to New York. The Volkswagen Group took a 20 year lease on a 115 acre parcel inside of Tradepoint Atlantic complex.

In 2023, it was announced that the US Department of Transportation Maritime Administration had allocated $47.4 million to redevelop the site of the former steel mill into an offshore wind turbine fabrication facility called Sparrows Point Steel.

== Ships ==
The Sparrows Point Shipyard site was a major center for shipbuilding and ship repair. Maryland Steel Company established the Sparrows Point yard in 1889, and it delivered its first ship in 1891. Bethlehem Steel Corporation acquired the Sparrows Point shipyard in 1917. During the mid-twentieth century, Bethlehem Steel Shipbuilding (BethShip)'s Sparrows Point yard was one of the most active shipbuilders in the United States, delivering 116 ships in the seven-year period between 1939 and 1946.

During the 1970s, Bethlehem Steel invested millions of dollars in upgrades and improvements to the Sparrow' Point yard, making it one of the most modern shipbuilding facilities in the country. This included the construction of a large graving dock to allow for the construction of supertankers up to 1,200 feet (370 m) in length and 265,000 short tons (240,000 t) (gross) in size.

Bethlehem Steel lurched from one financial crisis to another throughout the 1980s and 1990s, selling the Sparrows Point yard to Baltimore Marine Industries Inc., a subsidiary of Veritas Capital, in 1997 as part of an unsuccessful restructuring attempt. Baltimore Marine operated the facility as a ship repair and refurbishment yard until 2003, when Baltimore Marine Industries collapsed in bankruptcy.

The Sparrows Point shipyard complex was sold at auction to Barletta Industries Inc. in 2004. Barletta is attempting a redevelopment of the site for use as a business and technology park, and plans to revive shipbuilding on at least part of the site, making use of the modern graving dock added in the 1970s.

== Liquefied natural gas ==
In 2007, the international energy company AES Corporation applied to the federal government for a certificate to build and operate a liquefied natural gas (LNG) terminal at Sparrows Point. The AES Sparrows Point LNG development would consist of three 160,000-cubic meter storage tanks and vessel offloading systems for LNG tankers. AES would also construct a new natural gas pipeline, the Mid-Atlantic Express, which would run north from Maryland into Pennsylvania, crossing under the Susquehanna River to connect with existing natural gas pipelines. The 33-inch-diameter (840 mm) buried pipeline would be 88 miles (142 km) long. The Federal Energy Regulatory Commission (FERC) approved the project in January 2009, over the objections of state and county officials in Maryland and Pennsylvania. FERC chairman Jon Wellinghoff cast a dissenting vote, stating that in his opinion the region’s energy needs could be better met without including LNG in the mix. The Maryland Department of the Environment denied Sparrows Point a water-quality permit that would allow the company to dredge in Baltimore Harbor. A citizens' group, the LNG Opposition Group, also opposes the project.

== Company town ==
The steelmaking complex included a company town in its midst, initially planned by Frederick Wood and his brother Rufus Wood in the 1890s for Maryland Steel's thousands of workers. It had company stores, churches, and residential streets, with larger homes provided for upper level managers and rowhouses for other employees. By the time of the Great Depression in the 1930s, the company town had 9,000 residents. As employment levels grew in the 1910s, workers also commuted to the Sparrows Point industrial complex from communities such as Dundalk and Baltimore City, with the Pennsylvania Railroad operating passenger train service from Baltimore in the early years. Baltimore's United Railways & Electric Company (organized in 1899 and renamed the Baltimore Transit Company in 1935), provided fast, electrified trolley service on its #26 line, which operated over a dedicated, double-track right-of-way for much of its length to the steel mill and shipyard.

Although the company town was demolished in 1973, the nearby Baltimore County unincorporated community and census-designated place of Edgemere includes the Sparrows Point area and Sparrows Point High School, which continues to the present day.

== Notable person ==
- Johnny Olszewski, U.S. congressman; former Baltimore County executive and Maryland state delegate
