= Pressed Steel =

Pressed Steel may refer to:

- Pressed Steel Car Company, an American builder of railroad cars and equipment 1899–1956
  - Pressed Steel Car strike of 1909
- Pressed Steel Company, a British car body manufacturing business 1926–1965
- Maryland Pressed Steel Company, an American aircraft manufacturer 1914–1921
- Detroit Pressed Steel Company, manufacturer of Disteel pressed-steel automobile wheels 1917–1923

== See also ==
- Stamping (metalworking)
- Stamping press
