= Kostenko mine disaster =

2023 coal mining disaster in Karaganda, Kazakhstan

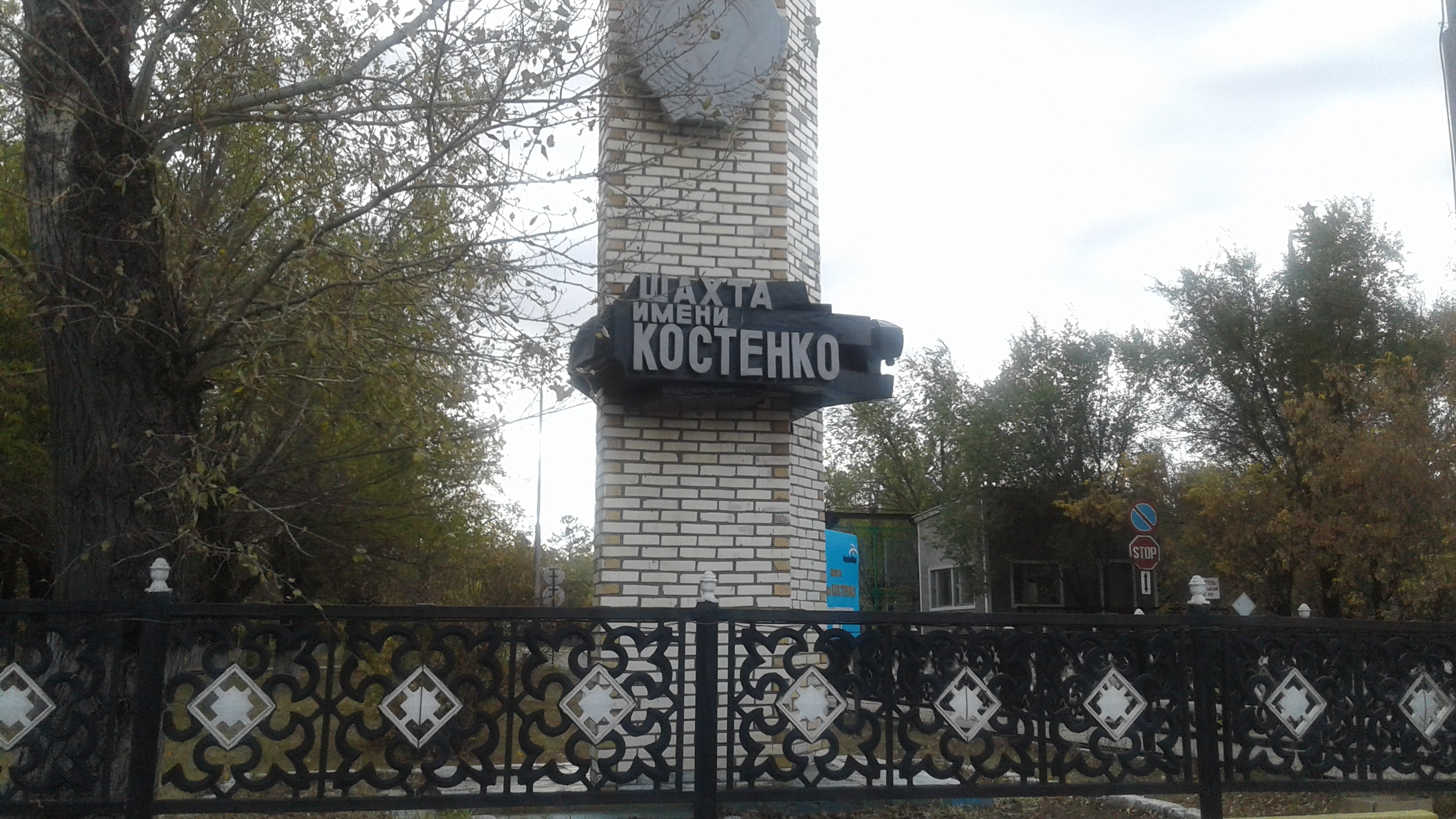
- Kostenko mine, 2016
- Date: 28 October 2023
- Time: 2:33 (UTC+6)
- Location: Kostenko mine, Karaganda, Karaganda Region, Kazakhstan; 49°51′36″N 73°06′54″E
- Cause: fire, caused by a methane gas explosion
- Deaths: 46
- Injuries: 18

On the morning of 28 October 2023, a fire started at the Kostenko mine in the Karaganda Region of Kazakhstan. The fire, presumably caused by a methane gas explosion underground, killed 46 miners. The President of Kazakhstan, Kassym-Jomart Tokayev, ordered the termination of all investment with the company ArcelorMittal Temirtau, which owns the mine, and 29 October was declared a national day of mourning in Kazakhstan.

== Background ==
The Kostenko mine is a coal mine owned by ArcelorMittal Temirtau, a subsidiary of Luxembourg-based steel manufacturing company ArcelorMittal, through multiple acquisitions that began with Ispat Steel purchasing the mine from the Kazakh government in 1995. The subsidiary owns the largest metallurgical plants in Kazakhstan, as well as eight coal mines and two iron ore mines. Over 100 people have died at ArcelorMittal Temirtau facilities over 15 years. Authorities had already expressed dissatisfaction with the company's failure to fulfill its investment commitments, modernize equipment, and ensure worker safety. Two months before the fire, an accident occurred at another of the company's mines, the Kazakhstanskaya mine, which resulted in the death of five people. After the accident at Kazakhstanskaya, government authorities stated that they had decided to nationalise the operation.

== Chronology ==
=== 28 October ===
At 02:33 ALMT at the Kostenko mine, a fire occurred at a level located about 700 metres (2,300 ft) deep. At the time of the incident, 252 people were in the mine, 205 of whom were brought to the surface. 18 people received medical assistance. Initially, four dead bodies were found, and three more were later discovered. 15 of the injured experienced carbon monoxide poisoning.

At 14:00, the bodies of 22 miners were found. A professional military rescue service helped with emergency operations. By 16:00, the death toll had increased to 32 people.

Later that night, at a briefing in Karaganda, it was said that the 13 people who had not yet been found had little chance of survival and that a fire from a coal furnace caused the disaster. The high death toll was the result of a subsequent gas explosion. By 19:00, the fire had been extinguished and the mine was safe for rescue work. The recovered bodies were so badly burned that their identification became challenging.

=== 29 October ===
In the morning, rescuers found four more bodies, with the death toll reaching 36. Twenty-nine bodies were brought to the surface, leaving 11 people still missing. At 14:00, the number of dead miners reached 38 people. Nine people remained missing from the mine. By 15:00, the bodies of 42 miners had been found, and the search for four miners continued. By 17:00, the number found had reached 45. One miner still remained unaccounted for and was presumed dead.

=== 30 October ===
According to the HOLA news agency, the 46th and last missing body of a miner was found in the coal mine, DNA tests will be conducted to determine the identity of the deceased miners.

== Aftermath ==
A government commission was established to determine the causes of the disaster. The Prosecutor General's Office of Kazakhstan opened a criminal case into the incident under Part 3 of Article 277 of the Criminal Code of Kazakhstan (violation of safety rules during mining or construction work). President Tokayev visited the mine and ordered the termination of all investment with the company, and 29 October was declared a day of national mourning in the country.

The ownership rights of ArcelorMittal Temirtau were set to be transferred to the government.

According to the Prime Minister's official website, 20 injured miners were treated at the Makazhanov hospital.

According to the Karaganda regional health department's bulletin published on 29 October, 28 people were taken to the hospital, 20 gas-poisoned people were slightly and moderately injured, one patient with various injuries was in the intensive care unit in a stable condition, one person was in traumatology in moderate condition, two miners were hospitalized in the Shakhtinsk center in moderate condition, and four people were sent to outpatient treatment. According to the Ministry of Emergencies published at 15:21, the bodies of 42 people were found, and four people are still being searched for.

Relatives of the victims of the disaster complained about the slowness of the search, and the representative of the emergency services explained that this was due to the fact that some parts of the mine were flooded, and therefore the search was difficult.

== Settlement ==
Survivors benefits will be provided to families of victims from three sources: the republican budget, social insurance, and life insurance companies. The average payment will be ₸400,000–500,000 (roughly US$1,000) per month until dependents reach the age of 18, or 23 if they are studying in a higher educational institution. ArcelorMittal Temirtau will secure the payment of all funds.

== See also ==
- ArcelorMittal#2018: Black snow controversy
