= Pennsylvania Steel Company =

Manufacturers located in Pennsylvania, US

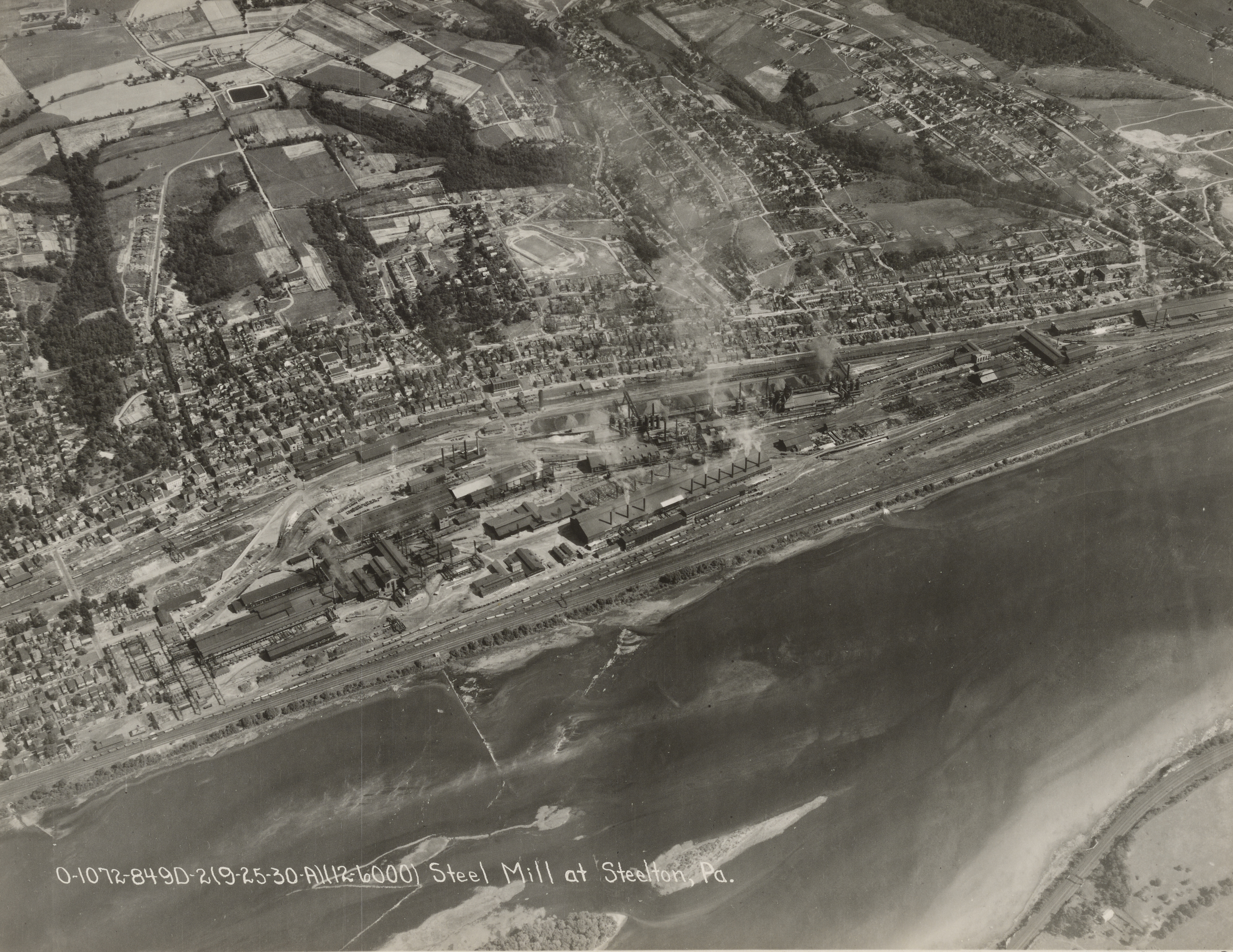
Pennsylvania Steel Company mill in Steelton, PA in 1930

The Pennsylvania Steel Company was the name of two Pennsylvania steel companies.

The original company was established in late 1865 by: J. Edgar Thomson, president of the Pennsylvania Railroad, Samuel Morse Felton Sr., recently retired president of the Philadelphia, Wilmington and Baltimore Railroad, and Nathaniel Thayer III of the Baldwin Locomotive Works. Felton, named president in January 1866, chose the 100-acre site of modern-day Steelton, Pennsylvania to build the first steel mill, purchasing land from Henry A. and Rudolph F. Kelker after obtaining the Bessemer license from Burden Iron Works in Troy, New York. Alexander Lyman Holley, the steel pioneer who first brought this process to America, was chosen to build the mill, and mansion for Felton, which was completed in 1867 along the banks of the Susquehanna River and next to the Pennsylvania Canal, and became operational on May 15, 1868. It consisted of blast furnaces and a Bessemer process mill. The company was acquired by Bethlehem Steel in 1917 and, by 1960, the open hearth furnaces were closed by a single blast furnace. Open hearth furnaces continued to operate until 1968 when they were replaced by electric arc furnaces. In 1983, a continuous caster was installed at the plant. Bethlehem Steel declared bankruptcy in 2001 and the plant was acquired by International Steel Group, which later merged into Mittal and then ArcelorMittal. The Steelton rail mill continued in operation until it was closed permanently by Cleveland-Cliffs in 2025.

The second Pennsylvania Steel Company was originally known as the Pennsylvania Steel & Aluminum Company, and was established in 1972 in Huntingdon Valley, Pennsylvania. It distributes and processes steel and aluminum products but does not manufacture raw steel or aluminum. The company was renamed the Pennsylvania Steel Company in 1988 and moved its production from Huntington Valley to Bensalem Township, Pennsylvania, in 1993.
