= Economy of Belo Horizonte =

Belo Horizonte, Brazil's sixth largest city, and the capital of Minas Gerais state, has a vibrant, diversified economy. It receives a large number of visitors and exerts a pivotal influence in the country's economy. Both multinational and Brazilian companies, such as Google, Deloitte, Thoughtworks, Localiza, Oi, and Fiat maintain offices or headquarters in the city. The service sector plays a very important role in the economy of Belo Horizonte, being responsible for 85% of the city's gross domestic product (GDP), with industry making up for most of the remaining 15%. Belo Horizonte has a developed industrial sector, being traditionally a hub of the Brazilian siderurgical and metallurgical industries, as the state of Minas Gerais has traditionally been rich in minerals.

Belo Horizonte is the distribution and processing center of a rich agricultural and mining region and the nucleus of a burgeoning industrial complex. Production is centred on steel, steel products, automobiles, and textiles. Gold, manganese, and gem stones mined in the surrounding region are processed in the city. The main industrial district of the city was set during the 1940s in Contagem, a part of greater Belo Horizonte. Multinational companies like FIAT (which opened its plant in Betim in 1974), Arcelor, and Toshiba have subsidiaries in the region, along with other textile, cosmetic, food, chemicals, pharmaceuticals, furnishing and refractory companies. Between the companies headquartered in the city we can list steel companies: Açominas (held by Gerdau, one of the largest multinationals originated in Brazil); Usiminas; Belgo-Mineira (held by Arcelor); Acesita (partially held by Arcelor); mobile communication Vivo; and Telecom Italia Mobile, as well as the NYSE-listed electrical company CEMIG. Leading steel product makers Sumitomo Metals of Japan and Vallourec of France have also plans to construct an integrated steel works on the outskirts of the city.

There are also a large number of small enterprises in the technological sector with regional to nationwide success, particularly in the fields of computing and biotechonology. Because of both governmental and private funding in the diversification of its economy, the city has become an international reference in Information Technology and Biotechnology, and is also cited because of the advanced corporate and university research in Biodiesel fuel. The number of jobs in the Information sector has been growing at annual rates above 50%. The Belo Horizonte Metropolitan Area, composed of 33 cities under the capital's direct influence, is home to 16% of the country's biotechnology companies, with annual sales of over R$550 million.

Projects in these fields are likely to expand because of integration between universities, the oil company Petrobras and the Brazilian Government. One of the largest events that ever took place in the city, the Inter-American Development Bank meeting, occurred in 2005 and attracted people from everywhere in the world.

For a long time it was marked by the predominance of its industrial sector, but from the 1990s there has been a constant expansion of the service sector economy, particularly in computer science, biotechnology, business tourism, fashion and the making of jewelry. The city is considered to be a strategic leader in the Brazilian economy. The move towards business tourism transformed the capital into a national hub for this segment of the tourist industry.

- In 2008, the city's GDP was R$42 billion (or about of US$26,2 billion).
- In 2008, the Greater Belo Horizonte's GDP was R$98,5 billion (or about of US$61 billion).
- In 2008, the city's per capita income was R$17,313 (or US$10,820). In 2007, it was R$15,830 (about of US$9,893).

The network in Belo Horizonte accounted for 7.2% of GDP in 2002 and came to 7.6% in 2006. The GDP per capita of the network was R $6,624 in 2002 and changed to R $10,638 in 2006, below the national level. The GDP per capita in the city of Belo Horizonte, who heads the network, it remained higher than the network, but with lower growth in the period, R $9,077 in 2002 and R $13,636 in 2006. In the network of Belo Horizonte, the participation of the municipality in total GDP declined from 19.6% in 2002 to 18.2% in 2006.
