= Alexander Oligerov =

Russian painter (born 1965)

- Александр Романович Олигеров
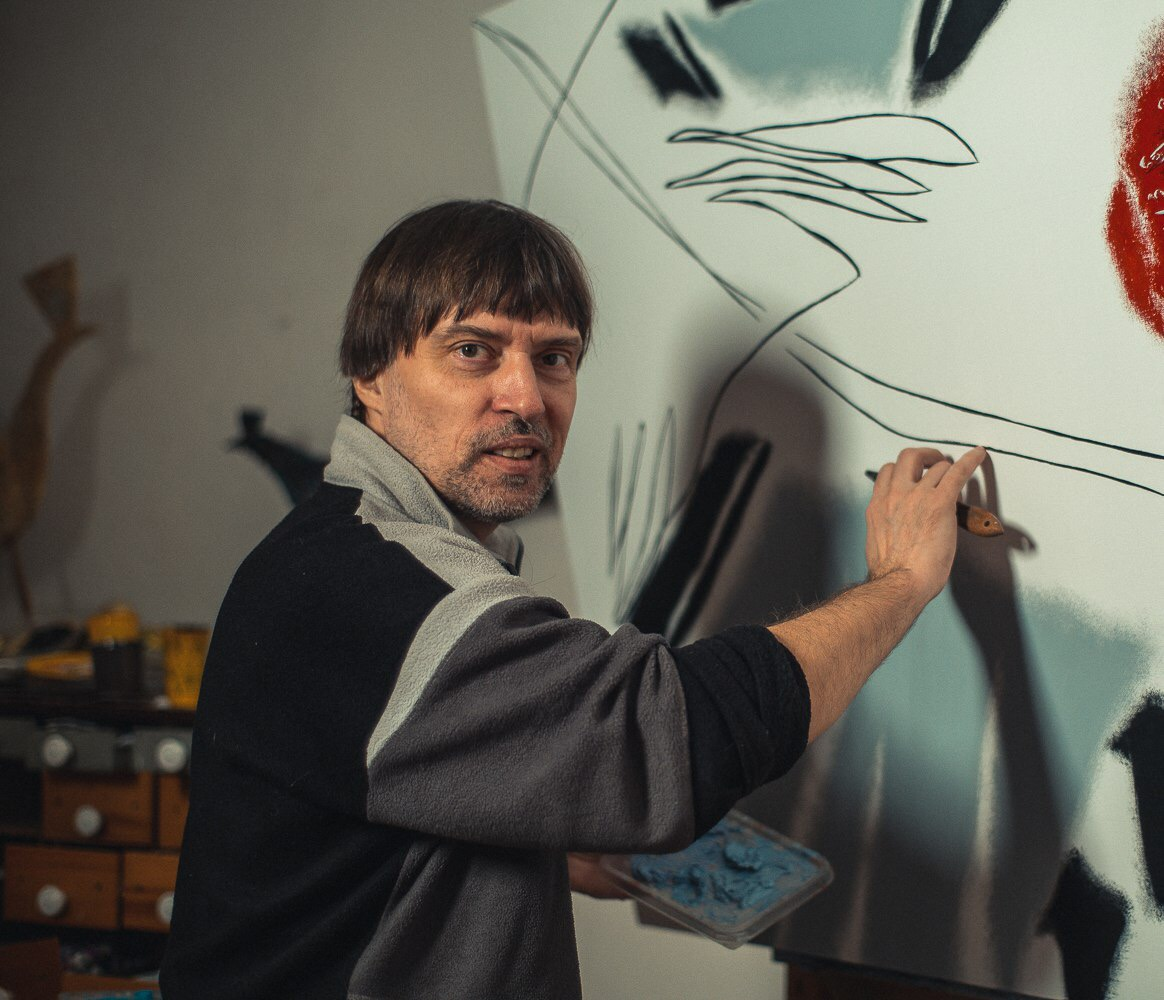
- Alexander Oligerov in his studio
- Born: Alexander Romanovich Oligerov; 22 February 1965 (age 61); Temirtau, Kazakh SSR, Soviet Union (now Kazakhstan)
- Education: Donetsk State Art College; Herzen State Pedagogical University
- Occupations: Painter, university educator
- Known for: Painting, abstract art
- Movement: Contemporary art
- Awards: Silver Medal of the Russian Academy of Arts (2006); Grand Prize, Art Revolution Taipei (2016); Gold Medal of the Russian Union of Artists (2018)
- Website: www.oligerov.ru

Alexander Romanovich Oligerov (Russian: Александр Романович Олигеров; born 22 February 1965) is a Russian painter and university educator. He is a member of the Russian Union of Artists, the Artists Trade Union of Russia, and the Paris-based artists' association Les Seize Anges. He is an associate professor of design and fine art at Novgorod State University.

== Early life and education ==
Alexander Oligerov was born on 22 February 1965 in Temirtau, Kazakh SSR. In 1985, he graduated with honours from the design department of the Donetsk State Art College. He subsequently studied at the Herzen State Pedagogical University of Russia in Saint Petersburg, graduating from the Faculty of Graphic Arts in 1993.

== Career ==
In 1992, Oligerov joined the International Federation of Artists under UNESCO. He became a member of the Russian Union of Artists in 2000 and joined the Paris artists' association Les Seize Anges in 2009. In 2011, he became affiliated with the "Free Culture" fellowship based at the Pushkinskaya 10 Art Centre in Saint Petersburg.

Oligerov teaches painting and typography as an associate professor in the Department of Design at Yaroslav-the-Wise Novgorod State University in Veliky Novgorod, where he has also served as head of the youth section of the regional branch of the Russian Union of Artists.

In 2014, the Erarta Museum of Contemporary Art exhibited Oligerov's paintings in its London gallery, followed by an exhibition in its Hong Kong gallery in 2015 and a solo exhibition at its flagship museum in Saint Petersburg in 2016.

== Artistic style and subjects ==
Oligerov works primarily in oil on canvas, producing abstract and semi-figurative works. His paintings frequently feature textured surfaces, calligraphic motifs, and contrasting color palettes. Over his career, he has produced several distinct thematic cycles, including:

- Red Room: A series of works exploring variations of red and dynamic movement.
- Movement to White: A series centered on light, minimal palettes, and white tones.
- The Stone Garden: Compositions inspired by spatial order and meditative themes.
- The Dedication to Unwritten Verses: A series incorporating script-like marks, literary motifs, and layered abstractions.
- My Correspondence with Bees: A collection of semi-abstract works based on natural textures and motifs.
- Color Dreams: A cycle of atmospheric works focused on nocturnal imagery and color contrasts.

== Awards and recognition ==
- 2004: First Prize ("Cap of the Master") in the Best Painting category at the international "Master Class" festival in Saint Petersburg, chaired by Mikhail Piotrovsky.
- 2006: Silver Medal of the Russian Academy of Arts, awarded for works presented at the exhibition commemorating the 250th anniversary of the academy.
- 2011: First Prize at the "Made in Russia" contemporary art competition in Milan, Italy.
- 2011: Special Prize from Russian Art (*Русское искусство*) magazine at the "Art-Preview" competition in Moscow.
- 2016: Grand Prize and Chairman of the Jury Award at the International Art Revolution Taipei competition in Taiwan.
- 2018: Gold Medal ("Spirituality. Traditions. Mastery") of the Russian Union of Artists.

== Exhibitions ==
=== Selected solo exhibitions ===
- 1997–1999: Stallen Gallery, Fredrikstad, Norway
- 2000: Crosna Gallery, Moscow; Grand Hotel Europe, Saint Petersburg
- 2001: University of Strasbourg, Strasbourg, France
- 2002: Russian Centre of Science and Culture, Helsinki, Finland; Paradise Gallery, Moscow
- 2003: EXPO-88 Gallery, Moscow
- 2007: BBK Gallery, Bielefeld, Germany
- 2008–2009: Galerie Gavart, Paris, France
- 2010: Krouvi Exhibition Halls, Lappeenranta, Finland; Ritz-Carlton, Moscow
- 2012: Museum of Nonconformist Art, Pushkinskaya 10, Saint Petersburg; Nest Pop-Up Gallery, Geneva, Switzerland
- 2013: Al Gallery, Saint Petersburg; Artistes Sentinelles, Paris, France
- 2014: East Meets West Gallery, ArtPlay Design Centre, Moscow
- 2015: Exhibition Hall of the Moscow Artists' Union, Moscow
- 2016: Master Gallery (*38 Steps to the White*), Saint Petersburg
- 2016: Erarta Museum of Contemporary Art (*Color Dreams*), Saint Petersburg
- 2016: Zoya Art Gallery, 798 Art Zone, Beijing, China
- 2017: Art Revolution Taipei, Taipei, Taiwan

=== Selected group exhibitions ===
- 1989: *Out of Genre* (Youth Palace), Moscow
- 1994: Russian Artists Auction, Pyramid Arts Center, Rochester, New York, United States
- 1998–2000, 2004, 2008: International Festival "Master Class", Manege, Saint Petersburg
- 1998–2000: International Art Salon, Central House of Artists, Moscow
- 2005: *60 Years of Victory in World War II*, Central House of Artists, Moscow
- 2006: *250 Years of the Russian Academy of Arts*, Saint Petersburg
- 2007: *Open Art: Five Continents Artists Meeting*, Atelier Grognard, Rueil-Malmaison, France
- 2008: Pommern Center of Art, Greifswald, Germany; Modern Art Gallery, Los Angeles, United States
- 2008–2010: *Building Bridges: International Art Exchange*, Ensenada, Tijuana, and Mexicali, Mexico
- 2011: *Made in Russia*, Open Art Milano Gallery, Milan, Italy
- 2012: 32nd International Hanseatic Days, Lüneburg, Germany
- 2013: *Artistes Sentinelles*, Paris, France
- 2016: Art Revolution Taipei, Taipei World Trade Center, Taipei, Taiwan

== Public collections ==
Oligerov's paintings are represented in museum collections in Russia, including:

- Museum of the Russian Academy of Arts (Moscow)
- Moscow Museum of Modern Art (Moscow)
- Museum of Nonconformist Art, Pushkinskaya 10 Art Centre (Saint Petersburg)
- Novgorod State United Museum-Reserve (Veliky Novgorod)
- State Museum of Artistic Culture of the Novgorod Land (Veliky Novgorod)
- Pskov State United Museum-Reserve (Pskov)
- Murmansk Regional Art Museum (Murmansk)

His works are also in private collections, including that of Samsung vice-president Lee Gil-han in South Korea (holding 42 paintings).
