= Temirtau =

Temirtau Теміртау (Kazakh) Темиртау (Russian)
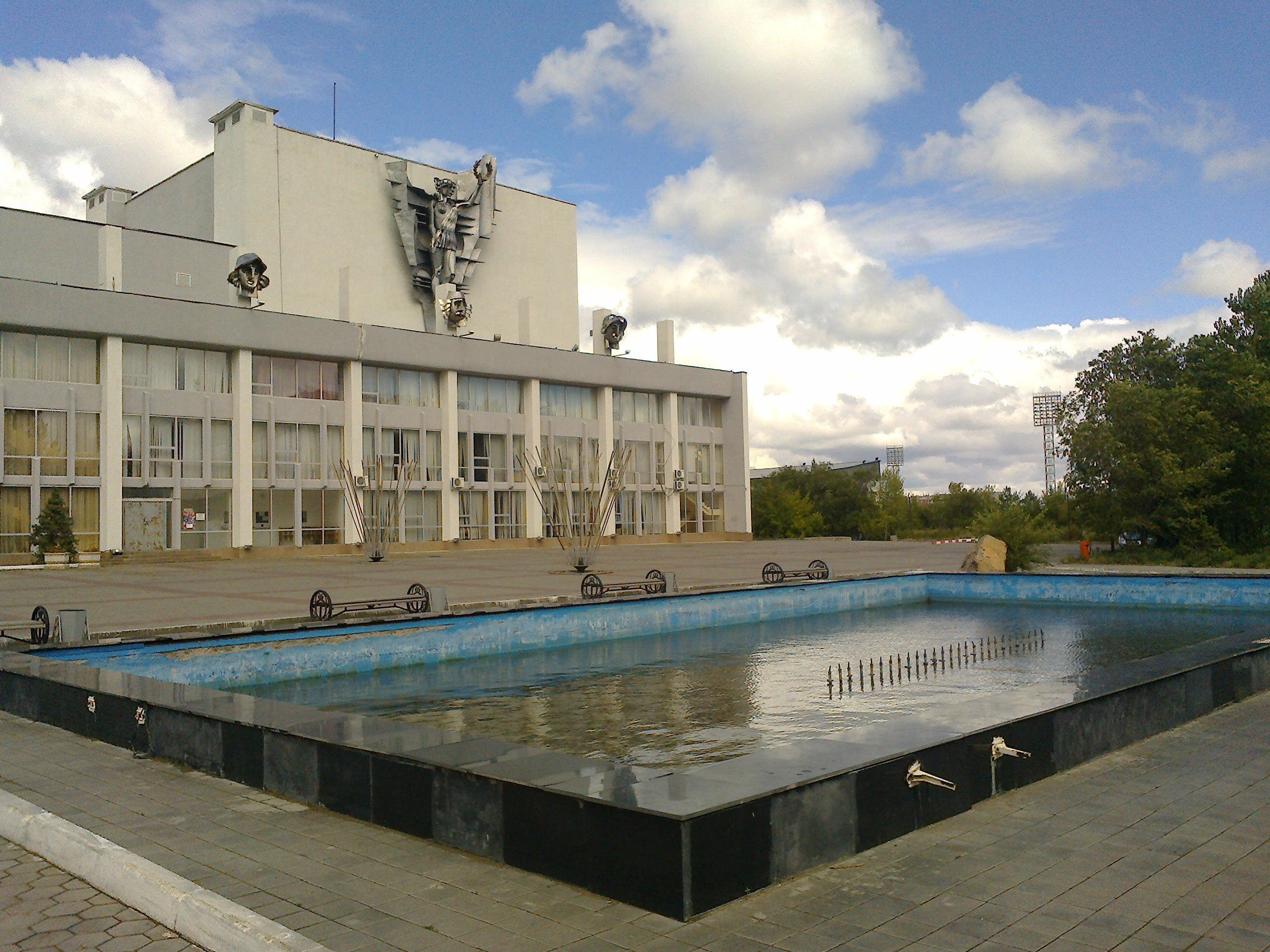
- Palace of Culture in Temirtau

- Seal

- Location in Kazakhstan
- Coordinates: 50°06′N 72°57′E
- Country: Kazakhstan
- Region: Karaganda Region
- Established: 1909
- City status: 1945

Government
  - Akim: Oraz Taurbekov

Population (2021)
  - Total: 185,409
- Time zone: +5
- Postal code: 101400
- Website: Akimat of Temirtau city

Temirtau (Kazakh: Теміртау, romanized: Temırtau; Russian: Темиртау) is a city in the Karaganda Region of Kazakhstan. The population was 170,481 in the 1999 census, rising to 210,590 in 2015.

The city is located on the Nura River (the Samarkand Reservoir), northwest of Karaganda.

== History ==
The first groups of settlers to settle in the area were 40 families from Samara (see Stolypin reform), who settled on the left bank of the Nura River on 15 June 1905. The settlement they founded was named Zhaur (Жаур), after a hill on the other side of the river. In 1909, the settlement was renamed Samarkandsky (Самаркандский, or Samarkand for short). The first school and the first hospital were built in 1911. In 1921, Samarkandsky became а part of the Akmolinsk Governorate within the Kyrgyz Autonomous Soviet Socialist Republic, an autonomous republic established in 1920 as part of the RSFSR (renamed the Kazak ASSR in 1925).

In 1933, the Samarkandsky-Karaganda water conduit was built to facilitate the development of the Karaganda coal field. In 1939 a 20-by-300-metre (66 ft × 984 ft) dam (50°06′17″N 72°55′08″E) was constructed across the Nura River, creating the Samarkand water reservoir, which would remain until 1961. Construction of the Karaganda State Regional Electric Power Station began in 1934, and the first turbine came online in 1942. In 1944, despite being still under construction, the Kazakh Steel Mill yielded its first steel, smelted in an open-hearth Siemens-Martin furnace.

The Samarkand settlement was granted city status on 1 October 1945, and renamed Temirtau ("Iron Mountain" in Kazakh). From 1947 to 1949, Japanese prisoners-of-war were kept in a camp near the town. In 1950, the Karaganda Steel Mill was founded. To build it the Soviet Union announced a "Nationwide High-Intensive Construction Project", and many young "shock-worker brigades" were brought from all over the Soviet Union and ally countries, including many from Bulgaria. In 1959 there were a series of riots and insurrections among the workers, who were highly dissatisfied with the poor working and living conditions and the interruptions in the supply of water, food, goods, tools and other resources as a result of mistakes by the administration. 16 workers were killed in the clashes, and 27 wounded, with 70 arrested and convicted. 28 police were also wounded in the fighting.

In 1960, blast furnace No. 1 yielded its first cast iron. In 1963, the Karaganda Polytechnical Institute (now Karaganda Metallurgical Institute) was founded as a Higher Technical Educational Institution attached to the Karaganda Steel Mill. During the 1970s, a new sports complex was built, including a 50 m (160 ft) swimming pool, a 15,000 capacity stadium, and an indoor ice-skating and hockey rink. In 1972, the "Metallurgists' Palace of Culture" was opened in the town, followed in 1978 by the "Vostok" recreational park, situated in the eastern part of the city and opened to the public. On 29 July 1978 a Warrior Monument with an Eternal Flame was dedicated to the soldiers from Temirtau who had been killed in World War II.

In 1980, the German Drama Theater opened in the city, the first German-speaking theater in the USSR since the dissolution of the Volga German ASSR and all its institutions in 1941 when most ethnic Germans were deported to Kazakhstan and Siberia. By legend, the creation of a new German theater was the product of the general geopolitical détente at the time. West German chancellor Helmut Schmidt is supposed to have asked Leonid Brezhnev about visiting a national theater of the German minority, who then ordered the re-establishment himself. There were only few Germans in the city of Temirtau, however, and the troupe often toured through many smaller towns and villages. The theater finally moved to the capital Almaty in the late 1980s.

In 1984 a new residential area was developed, named Zenica in honour of Temirtau's twin-town of that name in Bosnia and Herzegovina.

=== Years of Independence ===
On 28 December 1992, Alexander Svichinsky, the general director of the Karaganda Metallurgical Plant, was assassinated on the plant's premises. The murder caused a major public outcry, and the perpetrators were sentenced to capital punishment.

In January 1993, a new Winter Garden was added to Vostok Park.

In 1995, the Karaganda Steel Mill was transferred to Ispat International (later Mittal Steel Company), renamed Ispat-KarMet and eventually became the current Mittal Steel Temirtau, controlled by the ArcelorMittal group. In 1995, the Karaganda Metallurgical Plant was transferred to Ispat International (later Mittal Steel Company), renamed Ispat-KarMet, then Mittal Steel Temirtau, and from 2007, ArcelorMittal Temirtau.

In 2011, Temirtau inaugurated the First President’s Museum. The structure is a three-level building with a 48-meter diameter, 15.59 meters in height, and a total area of 4,526 square meters.

==== Pollution from steel mill ====
In January 2018, black snow fell in the city of Temirtau which locals blamed on the steel plant. Owner ArcelorMittal claimed that the discoloration of the snow was caused by a lack of wind which would otherwise blow the pollution away.

== Sports ==
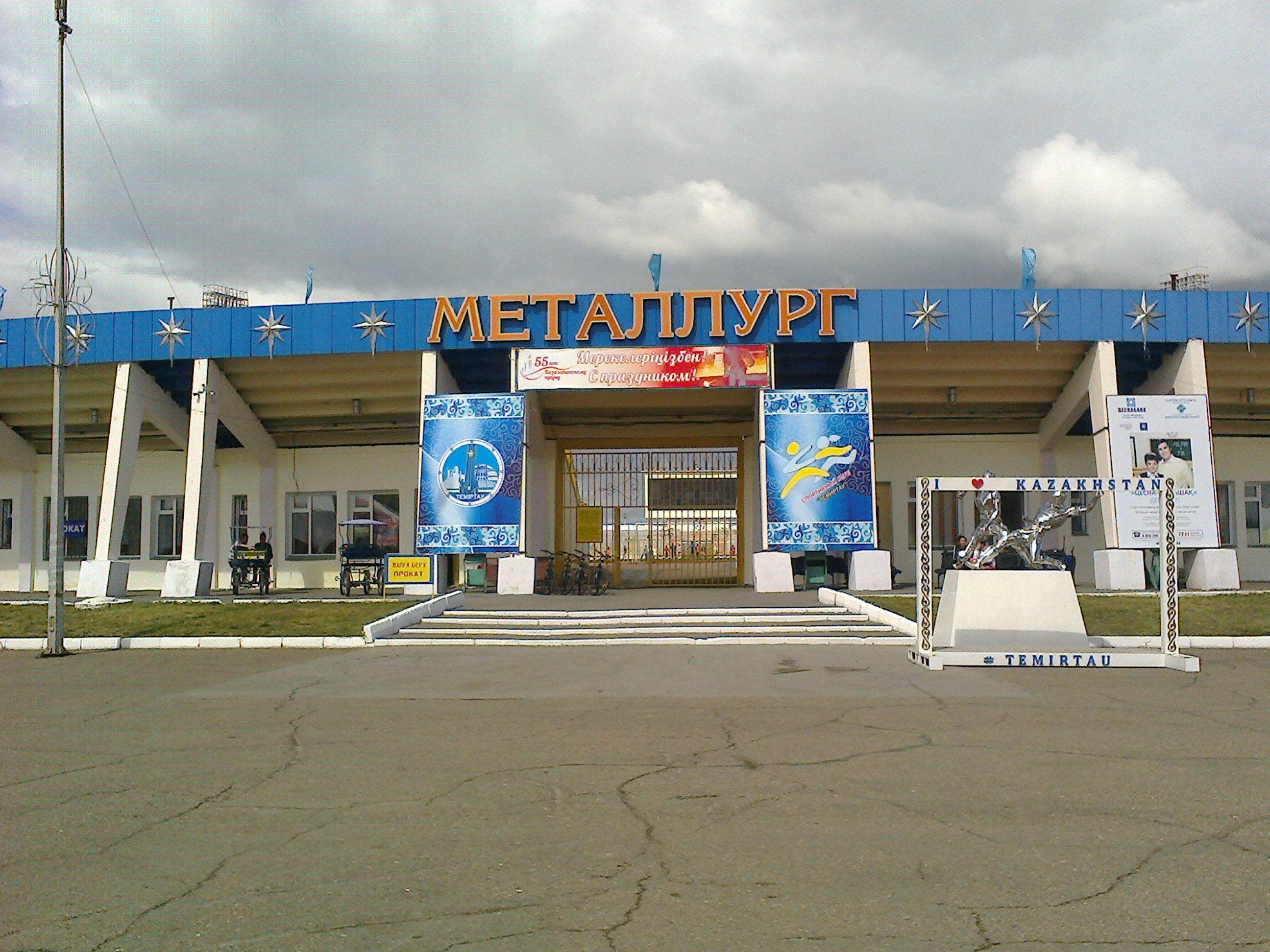
Metallurg Stadium

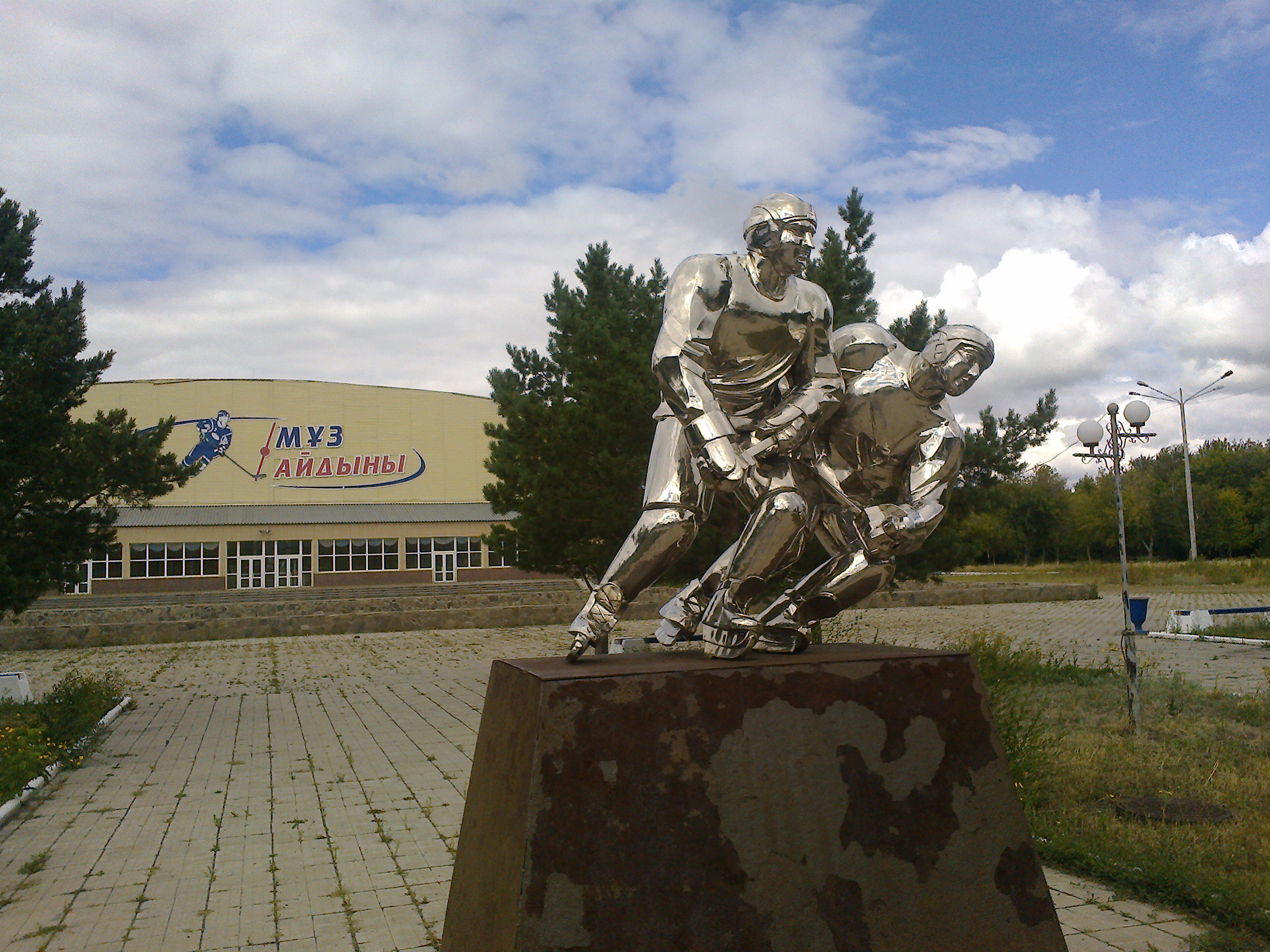
Temirtau Ice Sports Palace

Due to presence of large metallurgic plant in the city, Temirtau had been receiving significant sport infrastructure investments during soviet times in 1970-80-s. Sport and cultural facilities built at that time in Temirtau were exceeding level of facilities built in many regional ("oblast") centers of Kazakh Soviet Socialist Republic. Particularly, Metallurg stadium built in 1978 with 15,000 seating places was matching infrastructure required to play in the USSR Soviet First League, the Indoor Ice Palace was built in 1974 even though many Regional Centers at that time didn't have such a venue. But the most remarkable venue built at that time is the indoor Zhastar swimming pool (initially opened as "Dolphin"), which has 50-m length main pool with 8 tracks. At least until 2012 Kazakhstan winter championships had been taking place in this venue : despite multimillion investments in sport in Kazakhstan largest cities, Zhastar swimming pool even at 40-years old state was still unmatched in terms of infrastructure.

As a consequence of such massive modern infrastructure for relatively small population (about 200,000 inhabitants by 1980-s), Temirtau became one of the most successful sport cities in Kazakh Soviet Socialist Republic. Particularly:

- Yury Zaytsev who started his sport career in Temirtau and belonged to local Enbek sport association, was the first Olympic champion grown up in Kazakhstan;
- Shooting school of Temirtau produced 2-times world champion and bronze medalist of Olympics Vladimir Vokhmyanin, and 2002 World Champion Alexander Vokhmyanin
- Speedskater Radik Bikchentayev from Temirtau was a Flag bearer of Kazakhstan National Team during 2002 Salt Lake City Olympic Games;
- Swimmer Yevgeniy Ryzhkov, world swimming championship bronze medalist
- Bulat ice hockey club (known as Stroitel in Soviet times and Arystan during 2010-s) was a Kazakhstan Hockey League champion in 1998-99. Ice hockey school established in Temirtau produced multiple locally and internationally known players and coaches such as 1993 Ice Hockey World Cup champion Dmitri Frolov, former Kazakhstan National Team coach Galym Mambetaliyev, national team players and participants of IIHF world championships Artyom Likhotnikov, Anton Sagadeyev, 1998 Nagano Olympic games participants Vladimir Antipin and Vadim Glovatsky
- Bulat football club school produced several notable Kazakhstan national football team players: Maksim Samchenko, Ivan Sviridov, Vitaly Artemov, Oleg Lotov, Vladimir Kashtanov, as well as Valeriy Yablochkin, Sergei Yegorov
- Bronze medalist of 2008 Beijing Olympic Games taekwondo athlete Arman Chilmanov started his career in Temirtau
- Father of Jenia Grebennikov, 2 times volleyball olympic champion, is a volleyball player and coach from Temirtau, Boris Grebennikov
- Temirtau has strong rowing school based on the Samarkandskoye lake (which is in fact artificial industrial reservoir). For example, Svetlana Germanovich is two time Asian games medalist and 2012 Summer Olympics contestant.

Temirtau sent a bandy team to the Winter Sports Tournaments in Karaganda.

The town was home to FC Bolat football club, which played in Kazakhstan Premier League in 1990-s (7th place is the best result ) and later played in the Kazakhstan First Division.

== Nursultan Nazarbaev ==
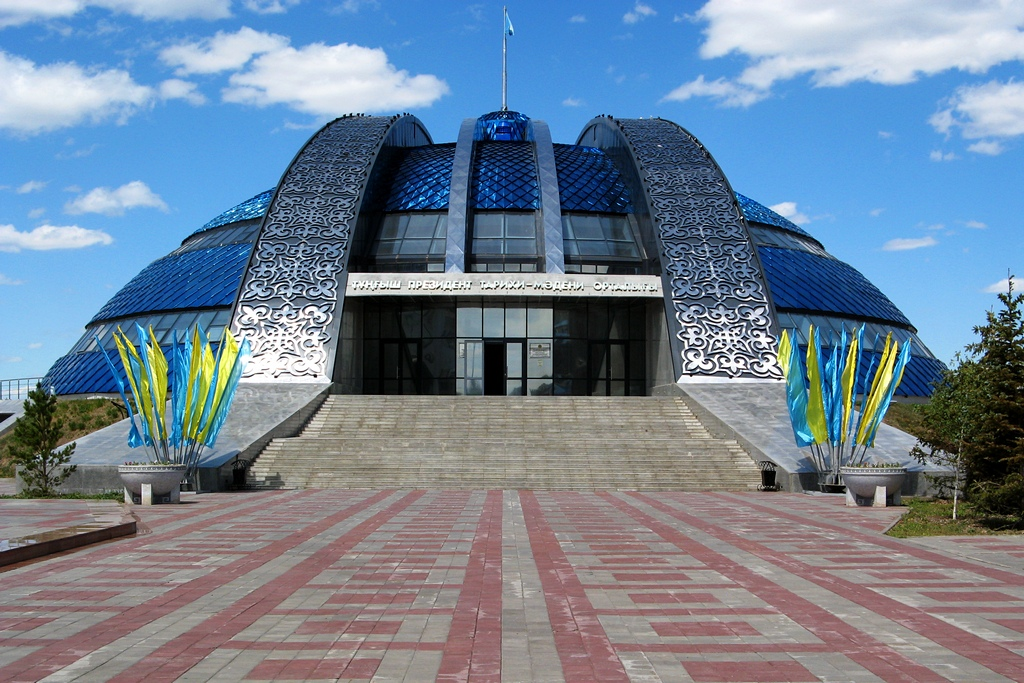
Museum of Nazrbayev

The city is associated with the first president of Kazakhstan, Nursultan Nazarbayev. In February 1962, the plant’s komsomol organization elected Nursultan Nazarbayev to be a delegate to the 10th Congress of the Komsomol of Kazakhstan.

In 2010, President Nazarbayev attended the 50th anniversary celebration of Kazakhstan’s Magnitka. In his speech, he highlighted that the production of the first pig iron marked the foundation not only of the Karaganda plant but of Kazakhstan’s entire iron and steel industry. The president awarded a Golden Star, honoring the veteran steelworker Arghyn Zhunyssov as a Hero of Labor of Kazakhstan.

== Notable people ==
- Toktar Aubakirov, first cosmonaut of Kazakh origin, first person in USSR who landed Fighter jet on the Aircraft carrier
- Radik Bikchentayev, speedskater, Flag bearer of Kazakhstan National Team during 2002 Salt Lake City Olympic Games
- Dmitri Frolov, 1993 Ice Hockey World Cup champion
- Galym Mambetaliyev, Kazakhstan National Ice hockey Team coach
- Nursultan Nazarbayev, first president of Kazakhstan
- Alexander Oligerov (born 1965), artist
- Yevgeniy Ryzhkov, swimmer, world swimming championship bronze medalist
- Maksim Samchenko, Kazakhstani footballer
- Alexey Sivokon, famous Kazakhstan powerlifter, several world record holder
- Oleg Soskovets, former First Deputy Prime Minister of Russia, former head of Boris Yeltsin reelection campaign
- Radik Temirgaliev, Kazakh historian and publicist
- Vladimir Vokhmyanin, 2-times world champion and bronze medalist of Olympics
- Yury Zaytsev, the first Olympic champion grown up in Kazakhstan;

== Sister cities ==
- Zenica, Bosnia and Herzegovina
- Kamianske, Ukraine
