= Votorantim Siderurgia =

Brazilian steel company

- Type: Private
- Industry: Siderurgy
- Founded: 2008
- Headquarters: São Paulo, Brazil
- Key people: Carlos Rotella (CEO)
- Products: Steel, Iron, Coal
- Number of employees: 5,390
- Parent: Votorantim Group
- Subsidiaries: Acerías Paz del Río
- Website: www.vsiderurgia.com.br

Votorantim Siderurgia is a steel company created in 2008 by Brazilian conglomerate Votorantim Group. At the time it was created, the company had 5,300 employees and operations in Brazil, Argentina, and Colombia and installed capacity of 2.45 million tonnes per year.

The company controls three steel mills in Latin America and the fourth is under construction in Brazil. In addition to their own plants, they hold 13% of the voting shares of Usiminas. The oldest unit is a steel Barra Mansa in Rio de Janeiro State, 1937. The other two plants - Acerías Paz del Río, Colombia, and AcerBrag in Argentina - were acquired in 2007. The steel construction, which entered into operation in September 2009, is located at Resende(RJ) and its ability to produce 1.03 million tons of long steel.

In addition to producing and selling steel, Votorantim Siderurgia acts in the operation of mines of iron ore and coal and in the development and management of forest plantations for the production of charcoal used in the production of pig iron, a major raw materials for the manufacture of steel.

In February 2017, ArcelorMittal and Votorantim announced plans to combine their long steel operations in Brazil. Under the deal, Votorantim Siderurgia became a subsidiary of ArcelorMittal Brasil.
