= Sergei Yegorov (footballer, born 1973) =

Kazakhstani footballer and official

Personal information
- Full name: Sergei Viktorovich Yegorov
- Date of birth: 13 April 1973 (age 53)
- Place of birth: Temirtau, Kazakh SSR
- Height: 1.87 m (6 ft 1 1/2 in)
- Positions: Forward; midfielder

Team information
- Current team: FC Khimki (director of sports)

Senior career*
Years	Team	Apps	(Gls)
1990–1992	FC Bolat	42	(6)
1993–1996	FC Shakhter Karagandy	129	(36)
1997	FC Energia Kamyshin	22	(0)
1997	FC Zarya Leninsk-Kuznetsky	19	(9)
1998	FC Gazovik-Gazprom Izhevsk	19	(3)
1999	FC Uralan Elista	13	(0)
2000	FC Baltika Kaliningrad	31	(4)
2001–2002	FC Sodovik Sterlitamak	36	(13)
2002–2003	FC Shakhter Karagandy	23	(2)
2004	FC Anzhi Makhachkala	15	(1)
2005–2006	FC Baltika Kaliningrad	21	(1)

Managerial career
- 2008–2009: FC Baltika Kaliningrad (director of sports)
- 2015–2016: FC Shakhter Karagandy (executive director)
- 2019–2020: FC Fakel Voronezh (director of sports)
- 2020–: FC Khimki (director of sports)
- * Club domestic league appearances and goals

Sergei Viktorovich Yegorov (Russian: Серге́й Викторович Егоров; born 13 April 1973) is a Kazakhstani professional football official and a former player. He is the director of sports with FC Khimki. He also holds Russian citizenship.
