= Business tourism =

Travel for work-related purposes

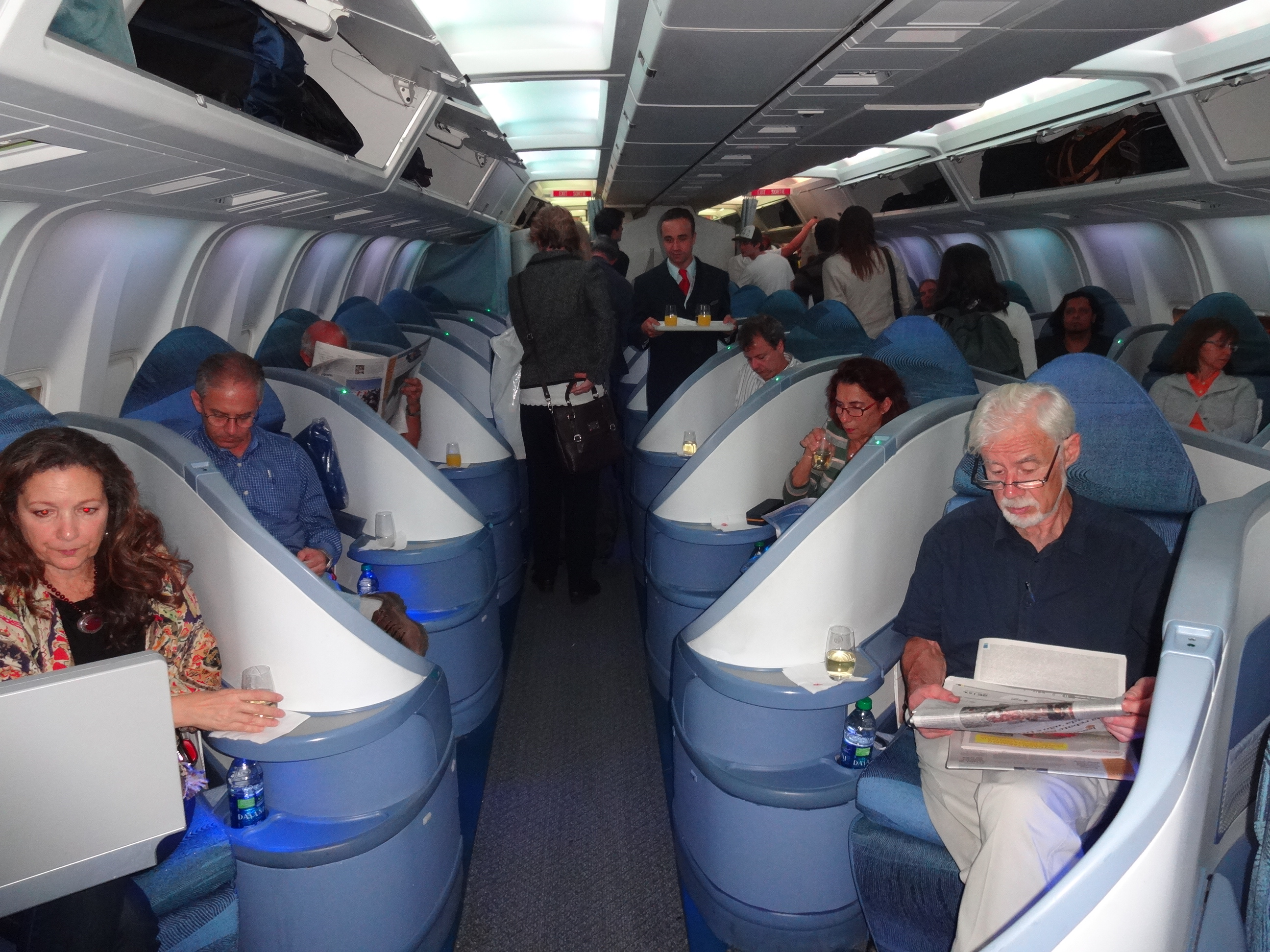

Business tourism or business travel is a more limited and focused subset of regular tourism. During business tourism (traveling), individuals are still working and being paid, but are doing so away from both their workplace and home.

Some definitions of tourism exclude business travel. However, the United Nations World Tourism Organization (UNWTO) defines tourists as people "traveling to and staying in places outside their usual environment for not more than one consecutive year for leisure, business and other purposes".

Primary business tourism activities include meetings, and attending conferences and exhibitions. Despite the term business in business tourism, when individuals from government or non-profit organizations engage in similar activities, this is still categorized as business tourism (travel).

== Significance ==
Historically, business tourism takes the form of traveling to, spending money and staying abroad, being away for some time, and has a history as long as that of international trade. In late 20th century, business tourism was seen as a major industry.

According to the 1998 data from the British Tourist Authority and London Tourist Board, business tourism accounted for about 14% of all trips to or within the UK, and 15% of the tourist market within the UK. A 2005 estimate suggested that those numbers for UK may be closer to 30%. Sharma (2004) cited a UNWTO estimated that business tourism accounts for 30% of international tourism, through its importance varies significantly between different countries.

== Characteristics ==
Compared to regular tourism, business tourism involves a smaller section of the population, with different motivations, and additional freedom-of-choice-limiting constraints imposed through the business aspects. Destinations of business tourism are much more likely to be areas significantly developed for business purposes (cities, industrial regions, etc.). An average business tourist is more wealthy than an average leisure tourist, and is expected to spend more money.

Business tourism can be divided into primary and secondary activities. Primary ones are business (work)-related, and included activities such as consultancy, inspections, and attending meetings. Secondary ones are related to tourism (leisure) and include activities such as dining out, recreation, shopping, sightseeing, meeting others for leisure activities, and so on. While the primary ones tend to be seen as more important, the secondary ones are nonetheless often described as "substantial".

Business tourism can involve individual and small-group travel, and destinations can include small to larger meetings, including conventions and conferences, trade fairs, and exhibitions. In the US, about half of business tourism involves attending a large meeting of some kind.

Most tourist facilities, such as airports, restaurants and hotels, are shared between leisure and business tourists, through a seasonal difference is often apparent (for example, business tourism may use those facilities during times less attractive for leisure tourists, such as when the weather conditions are less attractive).

Business tourism can be divided into:

- traditional business traveling, or meetings - intended for face-to-face meetings with business partners in different locations
- incentive trips - a job perk, aimed at motivating employees (for example, approximately a third of UK companies use this strategy to motivate workers)
- conference and exhibition traveling - intended for attending large-scale meetings. In an estimated number of 14,000 conferences worldwide (for 1994), primary destinations are Paris, London, Madrid, Geneva, Brussels, Washington, New York, Sydney and Singapore

The business tourism sector is sometimes referred to as MICE (meetings, incentive, conferences and exhibition).

== See also ==
- Environmental impact of aviation
- Hypermobility (travel)
- Marketing
