= Kostenko mine =

Coal mine in Karaganda, Kazakhstan

Coordinates: 49°51′36″N 73°06′54″E

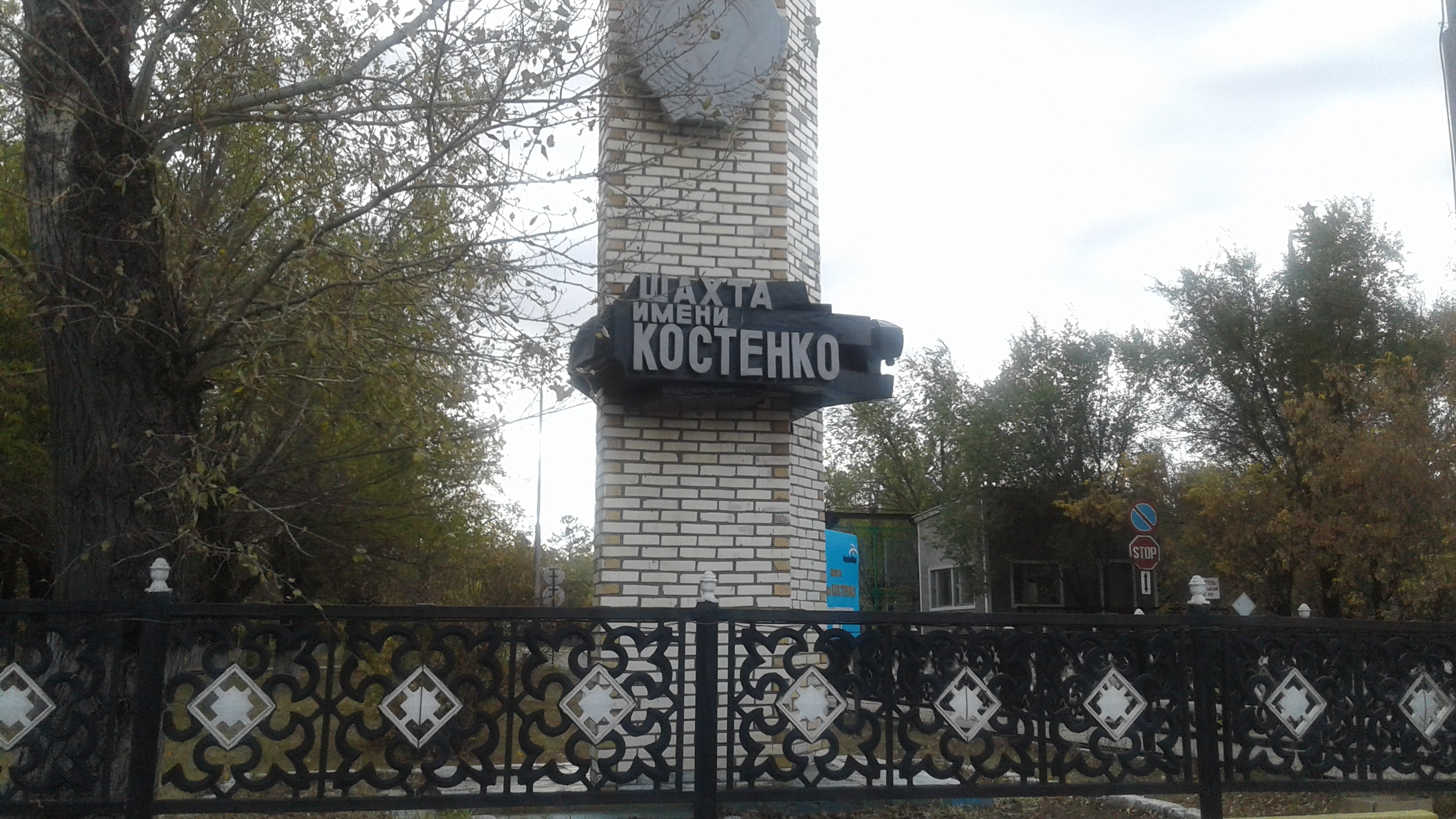
Kostenko mine in 2016

Kostenko mine (Kazakh: Костенко атындағы шахта, romanized: Kostenko atyndağy şahta, Russian: Шахта имени Костенко, romanized: Shakhta imeni Kostenko) is an underground coal mine in Kazakhstan, located in the city of Karaganda. It is named after Soviet coal explorer Ivan Kostenko.

On 28 October 2023, a fire in the mine killed 46 people.
