= Disteel =

Disteel brand pressed-steel automobile wheels were manufactured by the Detroit Pressed Steel Company, and were introduced in 1917 as an alternative to wooden artillery wheels with demountable rims. Pressed steel wheels were an alternative to fragile wooden wheels which would crack on impact with very rough roads. Steel wheels were both stronger and cheaper to manufacture, and could be painted any color the owner desired.

Disteel wheels were offered as an extra cost option on many vehicles produced at the time, to include Duesenberg, Lincoln, Cole, and Page-Detroit vehicles of the 1920s.

In March 1923, the Detroit Pressed Steel Company was merged with both the Parish and Bingham Company of Cleveland, Ohio, and the Parish Manufacturing Company of Detroit, to form a new company, called the Midland Steel Products Company by Elroy J. "E.J." Kulas, after leaving the Peerless Automobile Company.
