= Standstill agreement =

Agreement to delay corporate or legal action

The term standstill agreement refers to various forms of agreement which may be entered into in order to delay action which might otherwise take place.

== Examples ==
A standstill agreement may be used as a form of defence to a hostile takeover, when a target company acquires a promise from an unfriendly bidder to limit the amount of stock that the bidder buys or holds in the target company. By obtaining the promise from the prospective acquirer, the target company gains more time to build up other takeover defenses. In many cases, the target company promises, in exchange, to buy back at a premium the prospective acquirer's stock holdings in the target.

Common shareholders tend to dislike standstill agreements because they limit their potential returns from a takeover.

Another type of standstill agreement occurs when two or more parties agree not to deal with other parties in a particular matter for a period of time. For example, in negotiations over a merger or acquisition, the target and prospective purchaser may each agree not to solicit or engage in acquisitions with other parties. The agreement increases the parties' incentives to invest in negotiations and due diligence, respecting their own potential deal.

Standstill agreements are also used to suspend the usual limitation period for bringing a claim to court. Parties in a legal dispute may voluntarily withdraw their claims against each other to allow time for some other form of resolution and execute a standstill agreement to protect their legal rights.

== See also ==
- Greenmail
- Economics
- Mergers and acquisitions
- Microeconomics
- Takeover
- Industrial organization
