= International Steel Group =

American steel company (2002–2005)

International Steel Group Inc.
- Industry: Steel
- Founded: April 2002; 24 years ago
- Founder: Wilbur Ross
- Defunct: April 15, 2005; 21 years ago
- Fate: Acquired by Mittal Steel Company
- Headquarters: Cleveland, Ohio, U.S.
- Revenue: ▲US$9.015 billion (2004)
- Net income: ▲US$1.027 billion (2004)
- Total assets: ▲US$4.488 billion (2004)
- Total equity: ▲US$2.004 billion (2004)
- Number of employees: 15,500 (2004)

International Steel Group Inc. (ISG), headquartered in Cleveland, Ohio, was one of the largest integrated steel producers in North America. It had annual raw steel production capability of 23 million net tons. In April 2005, the company was acquired by Mittal Steel Company.

== History ==
The company was formed in April 2002 by affiliates of Wilbur Ross.

In April 2002, the company acquired the assets of bankrupt Ling-Temco-Vought (LTV), including facilities in Cleveland, Indiana Harbor and Hennepin, for $83.4 million in cash. In May 2002, ISG purchased inventories from LTV for $52.4 million in cash.

In October 2002, ISG acquired an idled sheet strip mill and basic oxygen furnace in Riverdale, Illinois from bankrupt Acme Steel for $60.9 million in cash.

In May 2003, ISG acquired the assets of bankrupt Bethlehem Steel for net $822.6 million in cash, including payments of $81.6 million for transition assistance for employees represented by the United Steelworkers of America trade union. The assets acquired included steelmaking and finishing facilities in Burns Harbor, Indiana; Sparrows Point, Maryland; Coatesville, Pennsylvania; and Steelton, Pennsylvania, and rolling and finishing facilities in Conshohocken, Pennsylvania; Lackawanna, New York; and Columbus, Ohio.

In December 2003, the company became a public company via an initial public offering.

In May 2004, ISG acquired the assets of bankrupt Weirton Steel, the second largest producer of tin mill products in the U.S., for $187 million in cash.

In June 2004, ISG acquired the assets of bankrupt Georgetown Steel for $18 million in cash.

In July 2004, ISG acquired an idled hot-briquetted iron facility in Point Lisas, Trinidad and Tobago for $18 million in cash. It was restarted in November 2004.

In April 2005, the company was acquired by Mittal Steel Company. Ross personally made a $260 million profit on his $3 million investment.
