= Mittal Steel Company =

1978–2006 European steel company

Mittal Steel Company, N.V.
- Industry: Steel
- Founded: 1989 as Ispat International in Sidoarjo, Indonesia
- Founder: Lakshmi Mittal
- Defunct: August 1, 2006; 19 years ago (acquired Arcelor to form ArcelorMittal)
- Successor: ArcelorMittal
- Headquarters: Rotterdam, Netherlands
- Area served: Worldwide
- Key people: Lakshmi Mittal (Chairman & CEO)
- Products: Steel, flat steel products, coated steel, tubes and pipes
- Revenue: ▲US$28.132 billion (2005)
- Operating income: ▲$4.746 billion (2005)
- Net income: ▲$3.365 billion (2005)
- Number of employees: 320,000 (2006)

Mittal Steel Company N.V., incorporated in the Netherlands and headquartered in the United Kingdom, was a steel producer. In 2006, it produced 110.5 million tonnes of steel and had annual production capacity of 138 million tons of steel. In August 2006, it acquired Arcelor to form ArcelorMittal.

The company was named Ispat International N.V. until a merger with LNM Holdings N.V. in 2004.

As of 2006, the company was 44.79% owned by Lakshmi Mittal and his family and 54.74% of the company was publicly traded.

== History ==
Growth of Mittal Steel's steel production, based on its acquisitions.

Mittal Steel Company is a successor to a business founded in 1989 by Lakshmi Mittal.

In 1989, the company leased Iron & Steel Company of Trinidad & Tobago from its government.

In 1992, the company acquired Sibalsa from the government of Mexico.

In 1994, the company acquired Sidbec-Dosco.

In 1995, the company acquired Hamburger Stahlwerke, which formed Ispat International Ltd. and Ispat Shipping, and also bought Karmet Steel of Temirtau, Kazakhstan.

In 1996, the company acquired Irish Steel.

It also acquired Walzdraht Hochfeld and Stahlwerk Ruhrort.

In 1997, the company became a public company via an initial public offering.

In 1998, the company acquired Inland Steel Company.

In 1999, the company acquired Unimétal.

In 2001, the company acquired ALFASID and Sidex.

In 2004, it bought a majority stake in Iscor, renamed Mittal Steel South Africa.

In 2004, the company acquired Polskie Huty Stali, BH Steel, and certain Macedonian facilities from Balkan Steel.

In 2004, it merged with LNM Holdings and was renamed Mittal Steel.

In January 2005, the company acquired Tadeusz Sendzimir Steelworks.

In 2005, the company acquired International Steel Group.

In 2005, the company announced a $9 billion investment in Jharkhand, India.

In October 2005, Mittal Steel acquired Ukrainian steel manufacturer Kryvorizhstal for $4.8 billion in an auction after a controversial earlier sale for a much lower price to a consortium including the son-in-law of ex-President Leonid Kuchma was cancelled by the incoming government of President Viktor Yushchenko.

In July 2006, the company announced plans to build a 12 million tonne capacity steel plant in Odisha, India.

In August 2006, the company acquired Arcelor in a $33 billion transaction to form ArcelorMittal, which owned 10% of steel capacity worldwide. The merger was consummated after Mittal Steel raised its bid for Arcelor and the Mittal family agreed to relinquish its controlling stake in the company and execute a standstill agreement not to acquire a controlling interest without approval from independent directors.
