= Shaitankol =

Lake in Kazakhstan

- Шайтанкөл көлі
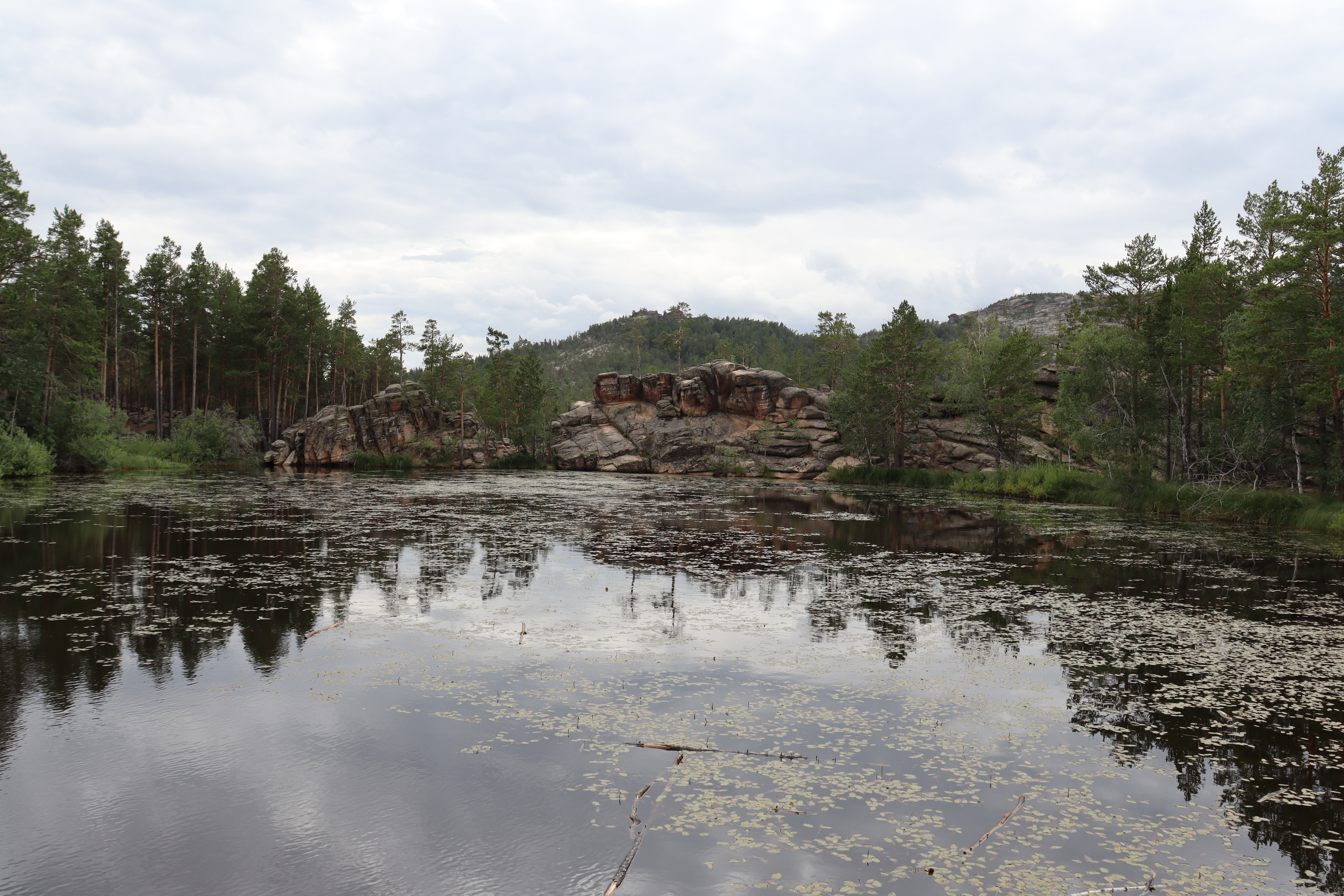
- Interactive map of Shaitankol
- Location: Karkaraly National Park
- Coordinates: 49°23′49″N 75°23′38″E
- Basin countries: Kazakhstan
- Max. length: 0.96 km (0.60 mi)
- Max. width: 0.04 km (0.025 mi)
- Surface elevation: 1,200 m (3,900 ft)
- Islands: 0

Lake Shaitankol (Kazakh: Шайтанкөл) is a lake in Kazakhstan, Karaganda Region. It is located 5 km to the southwest of Karkaraly.

== Geography ==
The lake is fed by groundwater and precipitation.

The lake is surrounded by granite cliffs.

== Legends ==
There are many folk legends about the lake.

According to the recollections of local residents, in 1905 Bishop Mikhail decided to raise a cross by the wishes of the local residents on the western shore of Shaitankol and renamed the lake Holy Lake. After some time, the cross disappeared, and the lake was again called Shaitankol. Some say that someone threw the cross into the water, where it remains to this day.

The depth of the lake remains unknown.
