= Karkaraly National Park =

National park in Karaganda Region, Kazakhstan

Karkaraly State National Nature Park
- IUCN category II (national park)
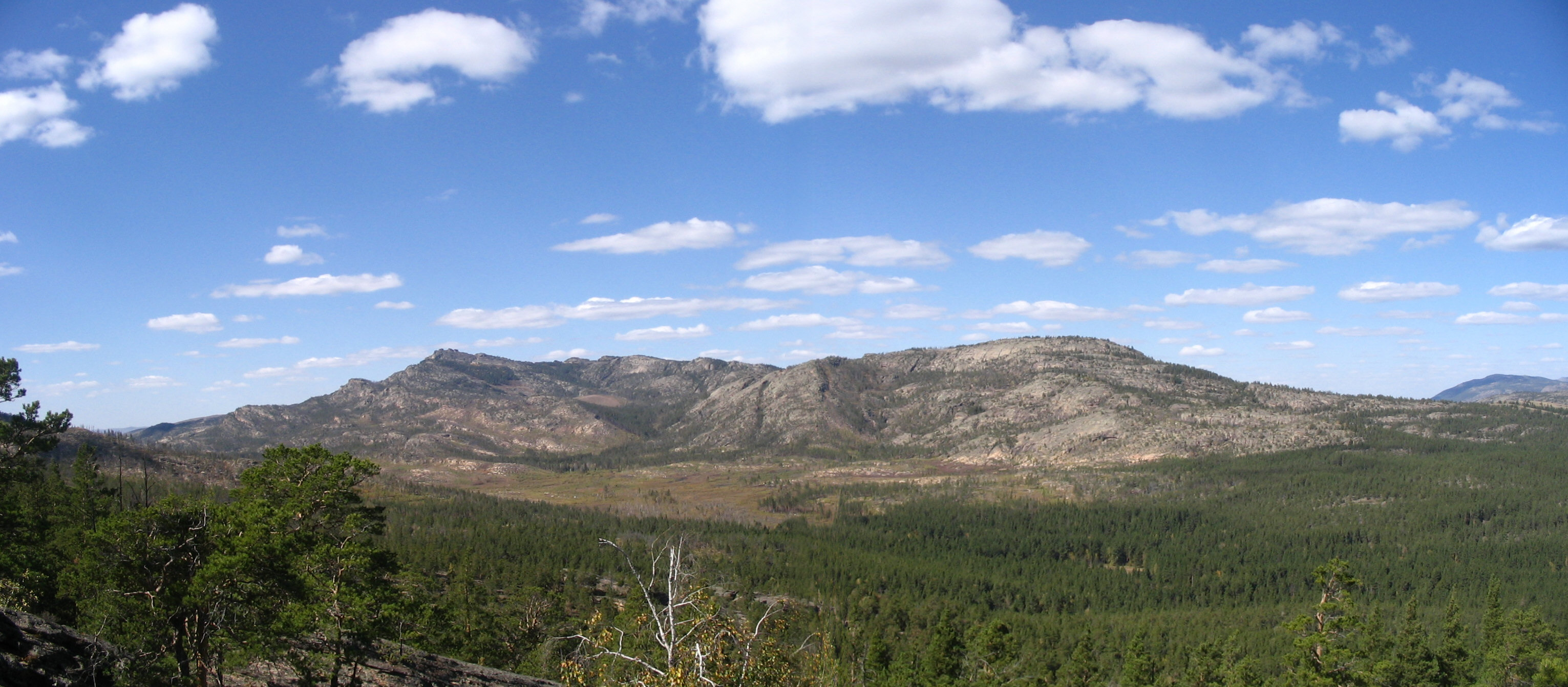
- Panoramic view

- Location within Kazakhstan
- Location: Karkaraly Range, Karaganda Region, Kazakhstan
- Nearest city: Karkaraly
- Coordinates: 49°25′0″N 75°25′0″E
- Area: 112,120 ha (277,055 acres)
- Established: December 1, 1998
- Governing body: Kazakhstan's Committee for Forestry and Hunting
- Website: www.karkaralinsk-park.kz

The Karkaraly State National Nature Park (Kazakh: Қарқаралы мемлекеттік ұлттық табиғи паркі, romanized: Qarqaraly memlekettık ūlttyq tabiği parkı; Russian: Каркаралинский государственный национальный природный парк) is a protected reserve and national park in the Karaganda Region of Kazakhstan. The park spans 90,323 hectares, and is located in the Karkaraly Range, Karkaraly District.

== History and administration ==
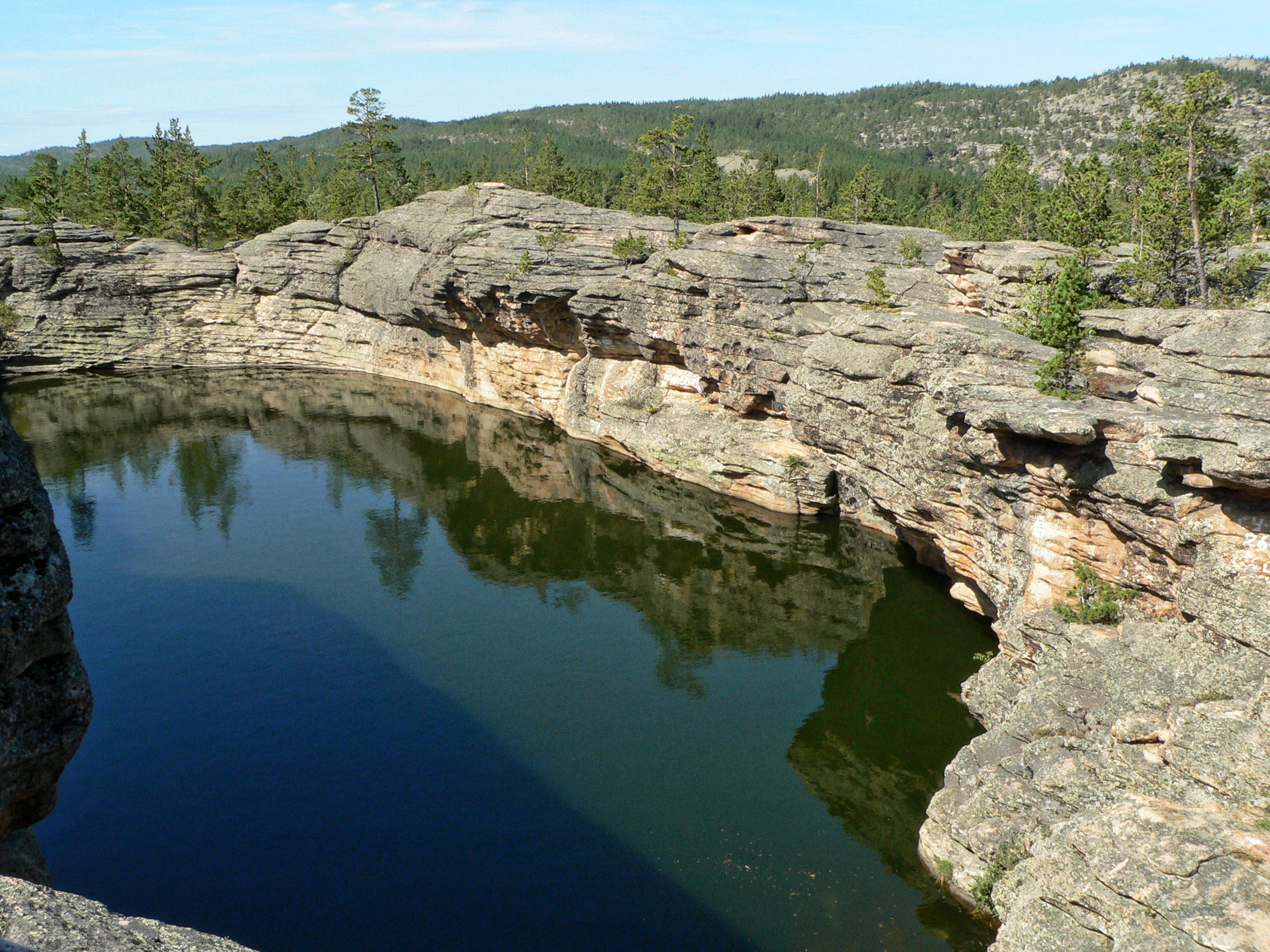
Lake Baceen

The area first became protected in 1884, as the Karkaralinsk Forest Reserve. In 1889, construction began on many of the parks cordons: Bedaik, Koktube, Ayushat, Tulkebai, Tonkurus and others. In 1913, a wooden cabin meant to serve as the house of the forest warden was constructed. The cabin has since become popular for its location within the park.

Pre-Bolshevik Revolution, all former forest cottages were allotted to army troops, Karkaraly Cossacks, and to local people. The Kent and Karkaralinsk forest cottages were part of the Karkaralinsk forest treasury and were state property. After the October Revolution, the entire forest area became part of the state forest fund.

Having undergone several administrative changes in 1947, the Karkaraly Forestry Department was organized. In the beginning of the 1990s, work began on the creation of the national park. On December 1, 1998, the Kazakhstani national government passed a decree turning the area into Karkaraly National Park. The primary goal of the national park is the protection and restoration of the natural area within the park boundaries.

The administration of the park is broken into four departments:
• Administrative Department
• Department of protection and wildlife management
• Department of science, ecological education and tourism
• Department of finance

The park has 120 employees. 104 of these are state forest inspectors.

== Geography ==
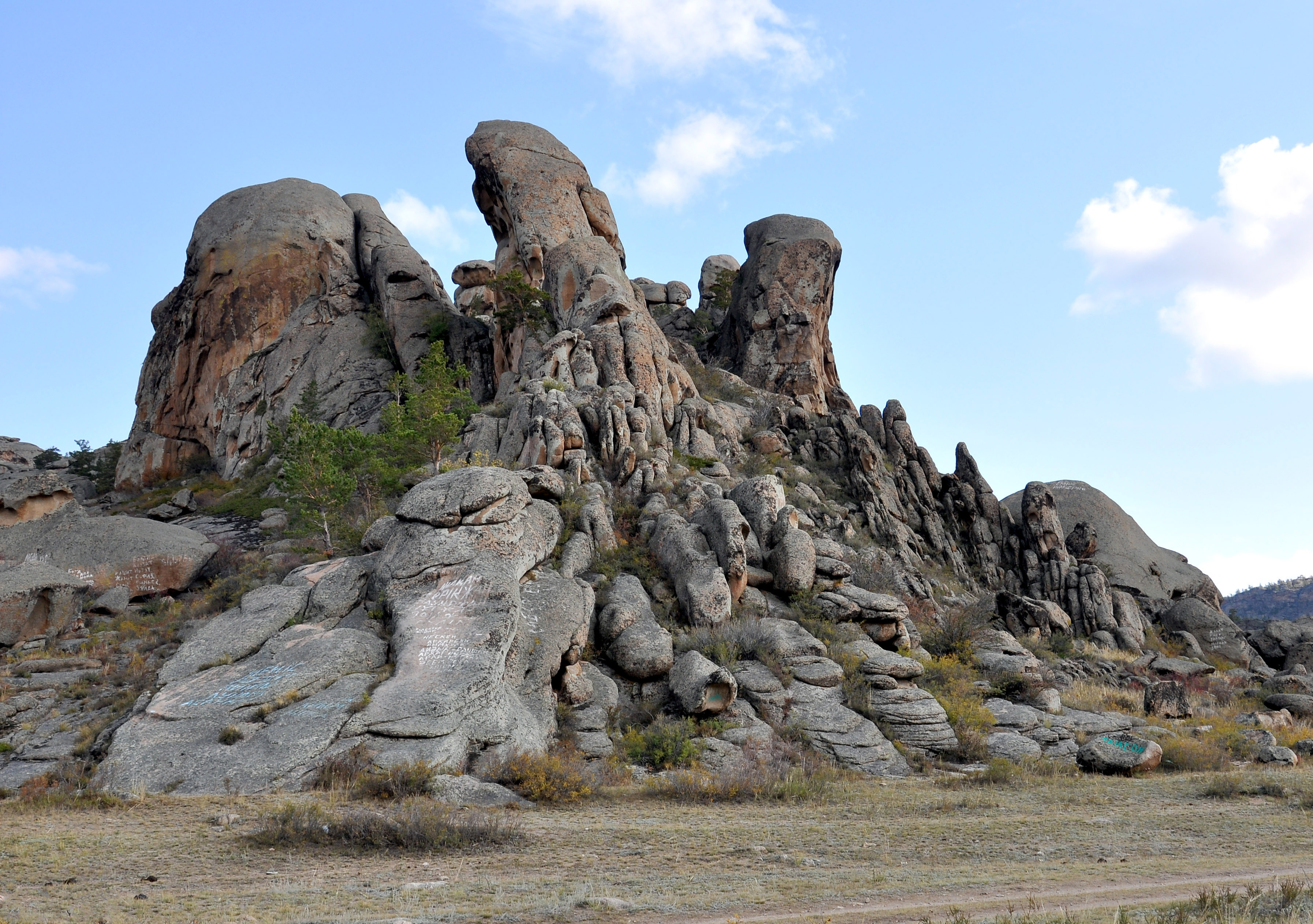

The total area of Karkaraly National Park is 90,323 hectares, of which, 40,341 hectares are forested. The park is divided into three sections: the mountain section, the Karkaraly Range section, and the Kent Range section. The mountain section is 25,576 hectares in size, the Karkaraly section is 23,846 hectares in size, and the Kent section is 40,901 hectares in size.
The park has 22,243 hectares where all forms of economic activities are forbidden.

- The park has 89,877 hectares where all economic activities under strict control are allowed.

Near the park are two other protected areas:
Bektauata National Preserve – 500 ha
Beldeutac National Preserve - 44,660 ha

In the Paleozoic Age (250-300 million years ago), this area of Kazakhstan was an inland sea. The water retreated 1.2 to 2 million years ago, when the ancient Paleozoic shield was cracked by granite. The area lifted and created the Kent and Karkaraly Mountains. The rocks and cliffs have been here ever since and for many thousands of years the untamable steppe wind and precipitation has sculpted the rocks into unique shapes.

People have lived in the Karkaraly area since ancient times. The earliest archeological finds connected with ancient people dates back to the Paleolithic (or Stone) Age. Archeological sites from the Bronze Age have been investigated more often. There are over 30 archaeological sites (from the Stone Age, Bronze Age, and Iron Age) of burial mounds and ancient settlements within the park boundaries. Some of these are the best discovered sites from these periods in Kazakhstan.

== Places of interest ==
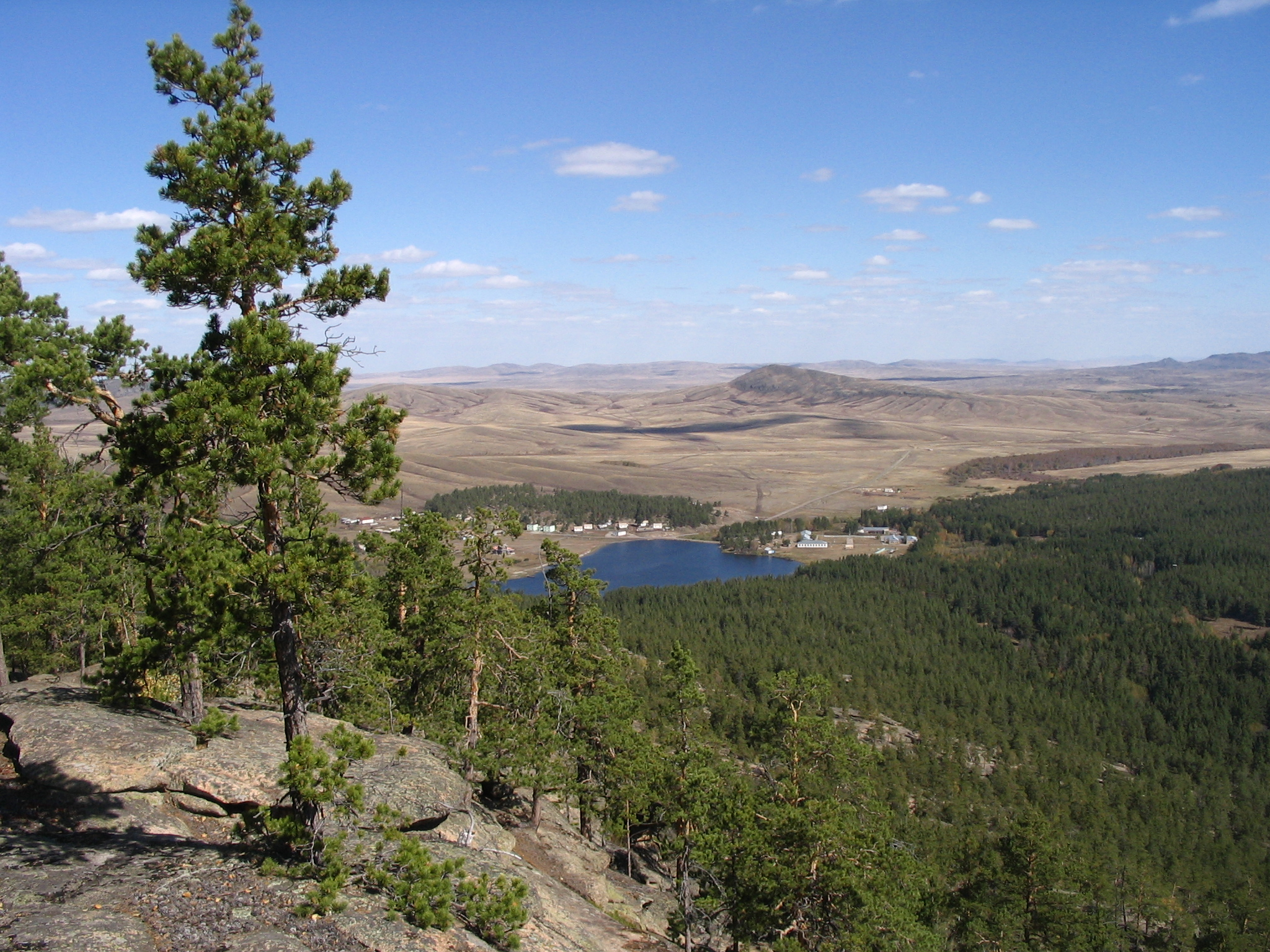

=== Nature Museum ===
Karkaraly National Park built a nature museum in 1983. The two-story wooden building consists of exhibition halls of flora and fauna found in the Karkaraly National Nature Park. In one of the halls of the museum is a 3D map of the national park. The building is known for its wooden interior. Adjacent to the nature museum is a large wildlife preserve that houses bison, red deer, fallow deer, yak, wild boar and argali.

=== Lake Baceen ===
Lake Baceen is located at 1200m above sea level and 4.5 km (2.8 mi) north-west of the city Karkaraly. You reach the lake on the Eco-Trail “The Stone’s Tale”. Literally translated from Russian, the lake's name is Lake Basin, due to the geological formations surrounding the lake. The lake is small- only .14ha. The lake is only accessible by foot and generally takes 4 hours round-trip.

=== Lake Shaitankol ===
Lake Shaitankol is one popular areas in the park. The lake got its name, which translates to "Devil's Lake", allegedly due to a high number of hunters getting lost in the area, sparking rumors that the devil was at work. The lake is located at 1200m above sea level and is 5 km (3.1 mi) west of the city Karkaraly. You reach the lake on the eco-trail “The Legend of Lake Shaitankok”. The lake is accessible by foot and generally takes 5 hours round-trip. The lake is oval in shape and surrounded by rock cliffs up to 10m high. The depth of the lake is unknown. The water level does not decrease throughout the year because it is fed underground water and precipitation.

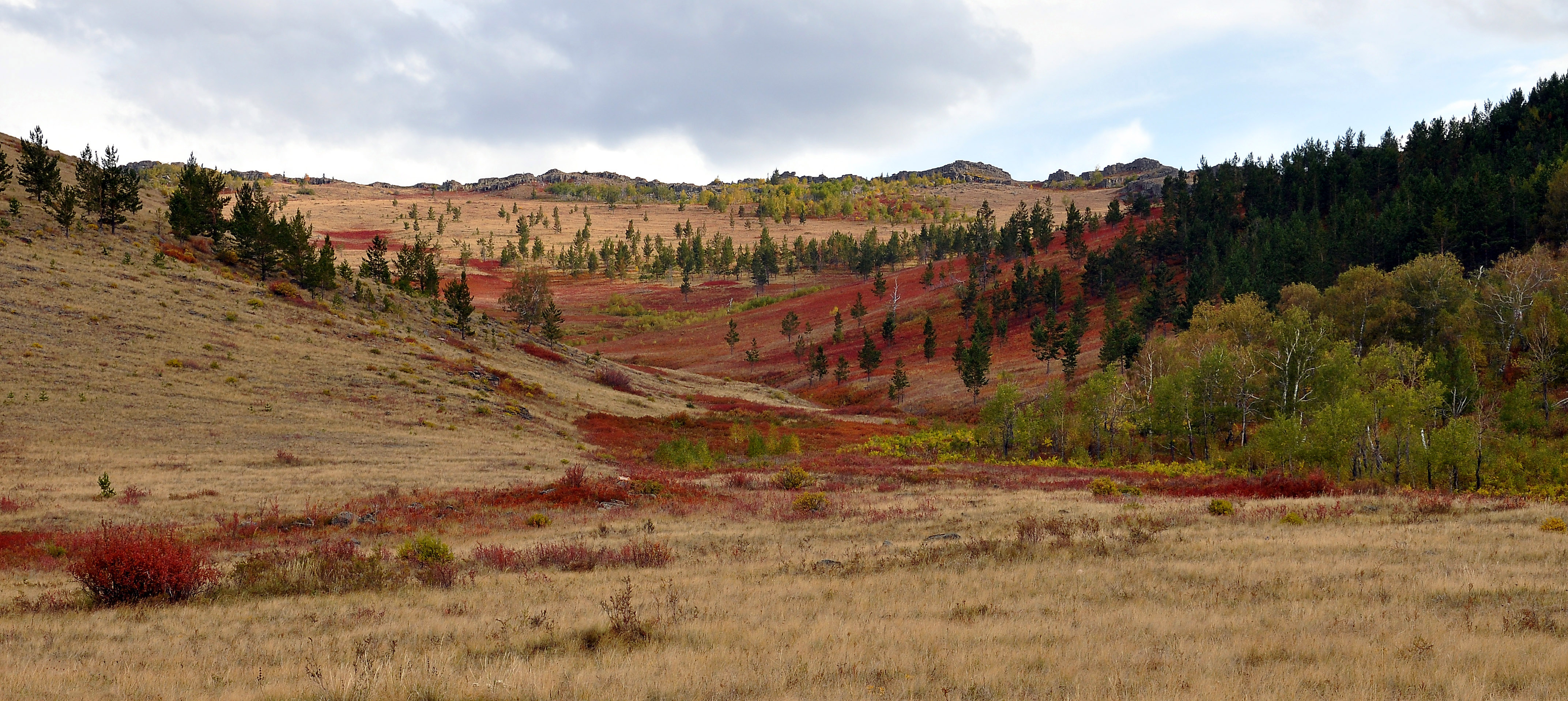
Kent Mountains

==== The Legend of Lake Shaitankol ====
A local legend regarding Lake Shaitankol tells the tale of a tragic love story. According to the legend, long ago there was a beautiful young girl named Sulushash, who was the daughter of a rich land owner named Tleuberdy. Sulushash fell in love with a poor shepherd named Altai, but Tleuberdy did not approve of their relationship and forbade them to see each other. Because of this, the lovers decided to elope, and along with a friend of Altai named Kausar. The three traveled many days across the Kazakh Steppe until they arrive in the Karkaraly Mountains, and took shelter at Lake Shaitankol.

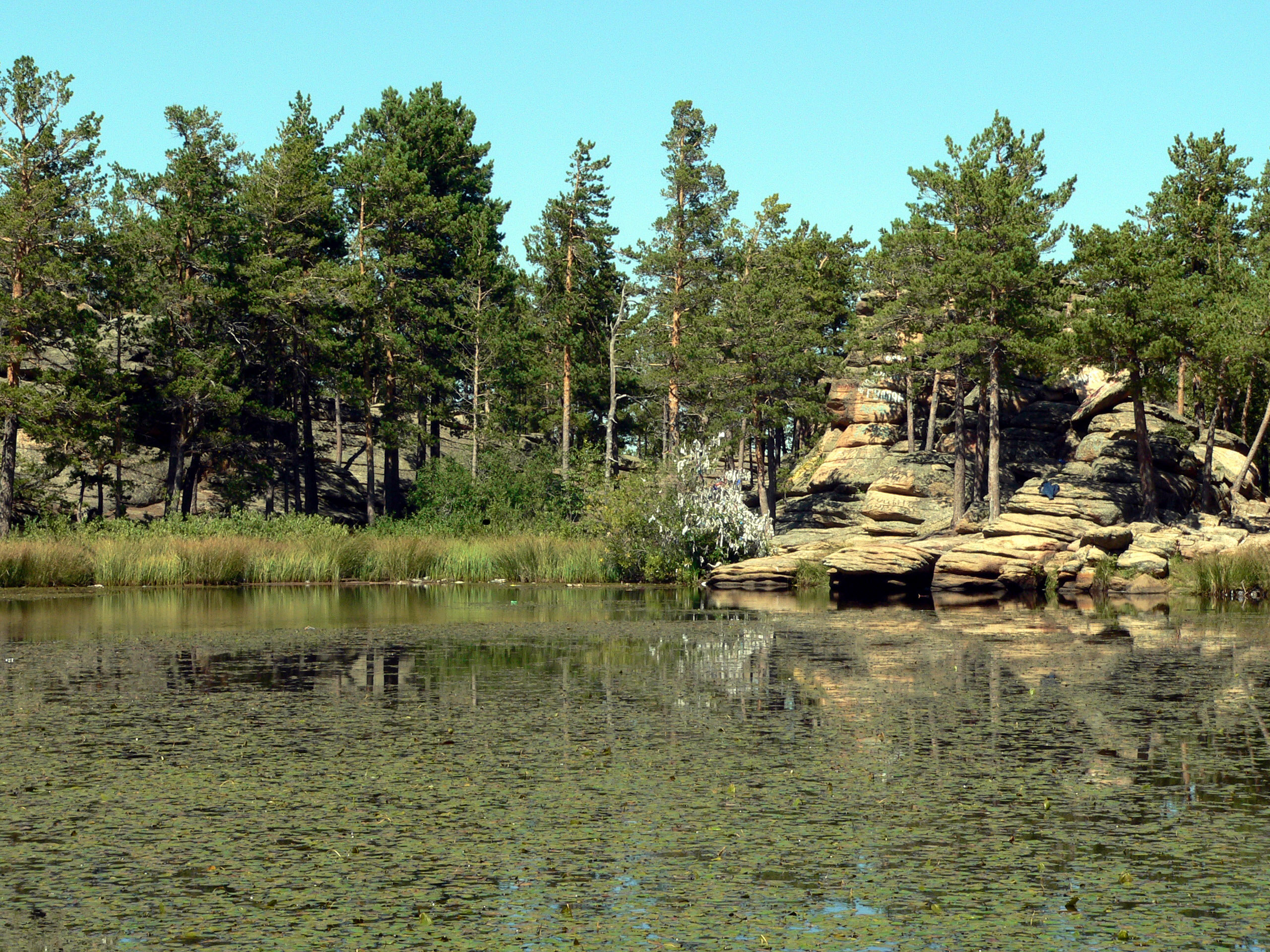
Lake Shaitankol

When they reached this area, Altai and Kausar left the girl by the lakeside and went hunting. While hunting for argali, Kausar fell down a cliff and died. In the meantime, Tleuberdy set the forest on fire in an attempt to force them out. Sulushash then hid in a cave, but was overcome by smoke, left the cave and began running. She ran directly into a tiger and in order to save herself from the tiger, Sulushash jumped into the lake and drowned. Having heard Sulushash's cry for help, Altai ran to the lakeside, but all he could see was her hat in the water. Distraught, Altai plunged a dagger into his chest.

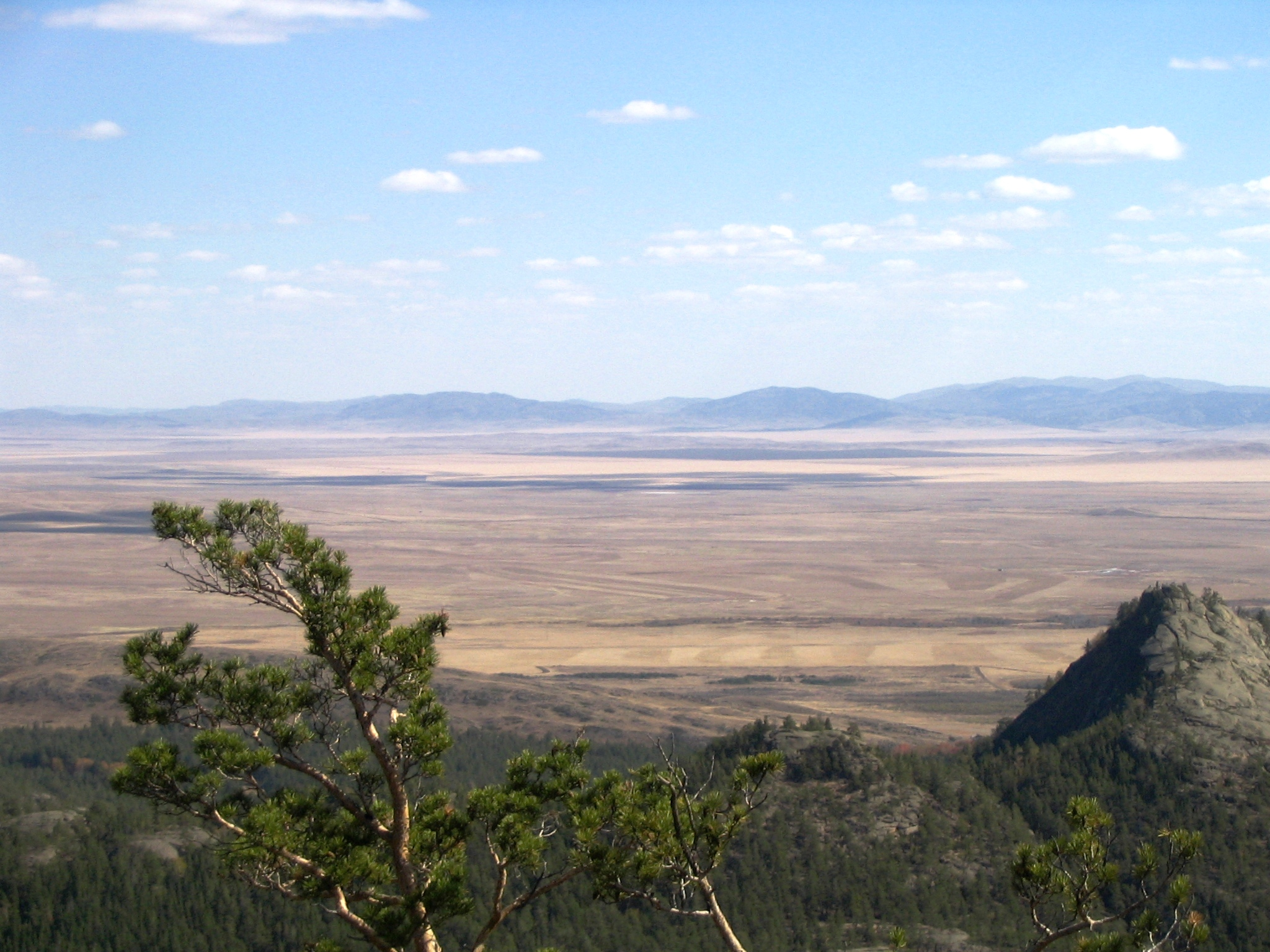

=== Big Lake ===
The most familiar and frequently visited body of water in the area is Big Lake. It is 2.5 kilometers from Karkaraly. It is 2.5 sq/km big and the maximum depth is 4.6 meters. The water is fresh and the color is yellowish-green. Near the shore the bottom is firm with gravel and sand, but in the center it is muddy. The lake borders the national park and is a popular site for fishing and swimming.

=== Shaktior ===
Shaktior is a complex of guest houses and hotels located on the shore of the Lake Pashanoye in the Karkaraly Mountains. It is located 7 km from Karkaraly and 224 km from the city of Karaganda. The picturesque scenery, combined with the pure forest air attracts many tourists to this holiday area. One of the hotels in Shaktior is a ski resort. Shaktior is owned by the Mittal Steel Company and historically has been a spot where miners in Karaganda could come for vacation. The national park eventually formed around Shaktior.

=== Zhirensakal Peak ===
Zhirensakal Peak (also known as Komsomol Peak) is the highest point within the Karkaraly National Park. Its height is 1403m above sea level. The summit of Zhirensakal is crowned with three huge stone "towers". During the time when Cossacks lived in this area, this rocky massif was called "Shish Kabani, which means “the habitat of wild boars”. In 1936, 100 boys and girls climbed the summit and named it Komsomol Peak. After the Soviet Union fell, the name was returned to Zhirensakal Peak though Komsomol is still used. There are two local legends about Zhirensakal Peak:

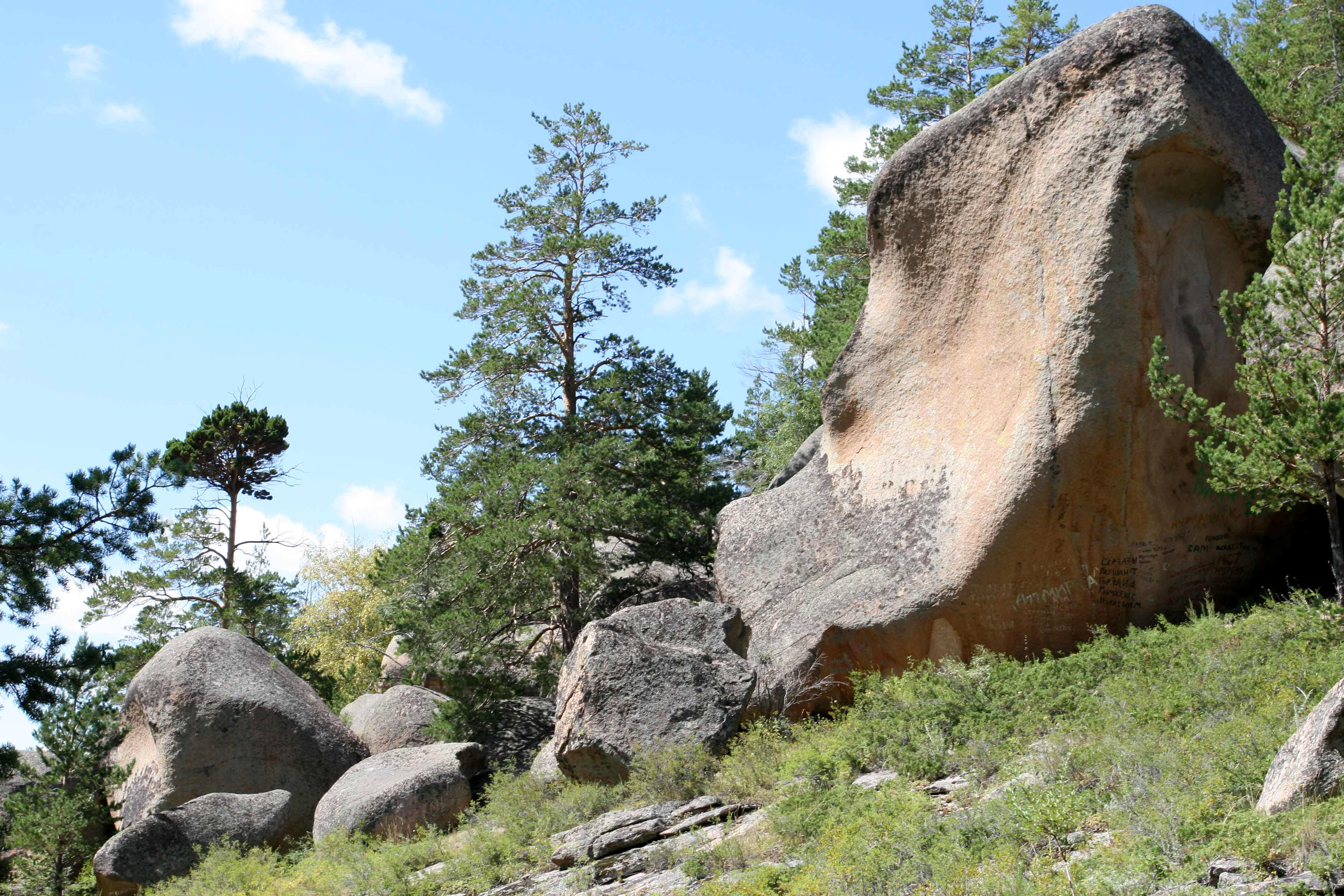

==== The Lord of Underground Wealth ====
Zhirensakal, the lord of the underground wealth, is known to live under the peak. From time to time, and recalculates his treasures, which makes the mountain rumble and shake loose rocks.

==== The Spirit in the Mountains ====
Another legend tells the story of a family who travels into the mountain:

At the peak of Zhirensakal is a cave, in which lies a stone table and stone chair. In olden days, a wizard named Babay Shashty Aziz lived in this cave. The wizard had the miraculous power to fulfill every desire of visitors. Long ago there was a family who was living in a yurt at the foot of the majestic peak. The old woman was the first to decide to try her luck with the wizard. She made her way to “the cave of the spirit in the mountains” and patiently waited. At midnight she heard a noise and saw a bright flash of light. At this moment the old woman saw the wrinkled face of the owner of the cave, seated on a stone chair in front of the stone table. The lord of the mountains ominously asked:
”What do you want woman?”
The woman replied, “Make me young and beautiful!”
The lord of the mountain then said, “Go back home. I have granted your request.”

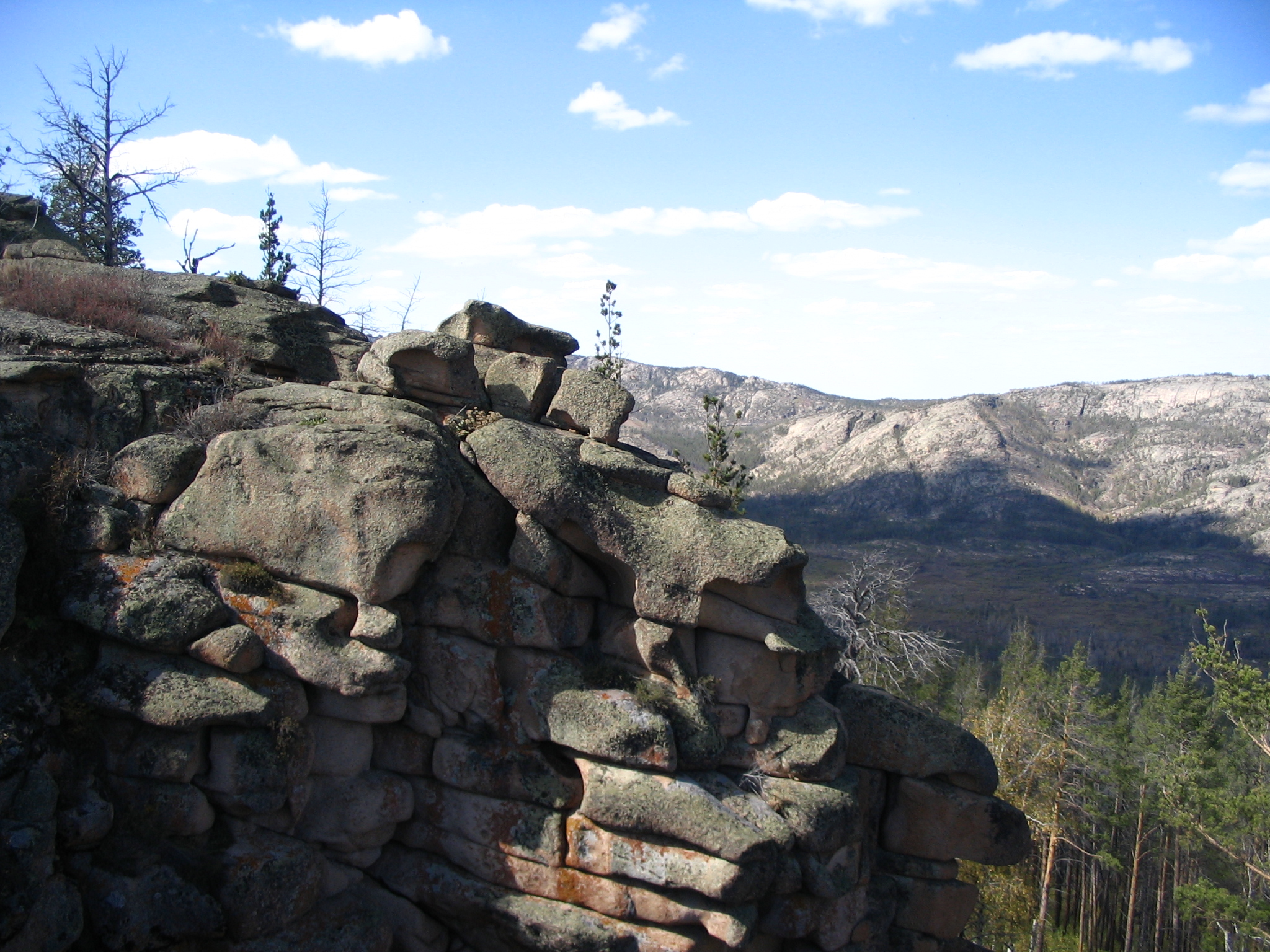

No sooner had the old woman taken one step towards home, when she felt an extraordinary lightness. Jumping from stone to stone, she rushed down the mountain, where her husband and son awaited her. But there was no joy in the reunion. After seeing how her husband was a decrepit, feeble, old man, the young wife decided to leave his yurt. Saddened by these events, the old man also went to the wizard and asked him to return his wife. His wish was also granted.

When the old man had returned to his yurt, he met his wife. The woman was no longer the young, capricious woman of a few days before. She was now even more bent and aged. Her husband also seemed to be much older than before. Now the son decided to try his luck. He climbed the peak and asked the spirit of the mountains to return his parents to how they were 3 days before. The son's desire was fulfilled and the family began to live happily again. Everything seemed to be as it should, and their journey to the cave was nearly forgotten. But occasionally the old woman, with her hand shading the sun from her eyes, would glance at the mouth of the cave where the spirit lived and would remember her second youth.

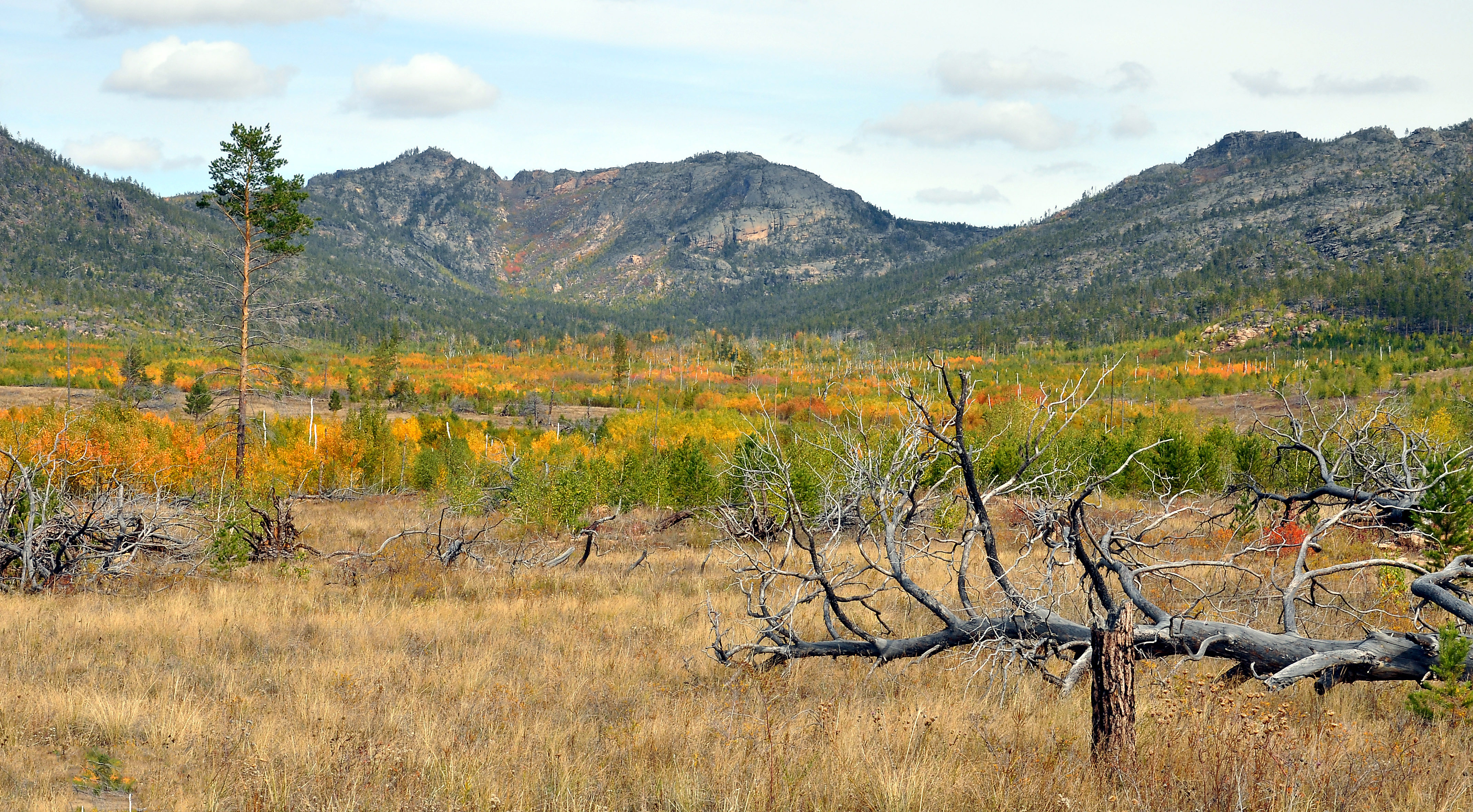
Kent Mountains

=== House of the Forest Warden ===
This building is one of the most well-known buildings in this area. It was built between 1910 and 1913 near the village of Komissarovka. The wooden house was constructed and decorated by the woodcarver Oomeltcen Smetankinym. Construction of the house of the forest warden was completed in 1913. The first owner of this structure was forest warden L. S. Sadovnichy.

=== Kizhel Kensh Palace ===
Kyzyl-Kensh is in the Kent Mountains and is an architectural monument of the time of the Dzungar invasion of the Kazakh steppe. It is the ruins of Buddhist monastery from the 17th century. It is located in a small valley almost completely surrounded by rocky mountains. The official name of the monument is “Kyzyl Kensh Palace", which means "red ore" or "red city". The monastery was built here by the Dzungars in the mid-17th century. Ochirtu-Tsetsen Khan ruled them during this time and lived in the monastery of lamas. According to scientists, the monastery was inhabited for as much as 50 years. Then the people left, though it is not known if they left voluntarily or were forced to for some reason.

In the 19th century an ethnographic expedition from Tsarist Russia was conducted in the Kent Mountains. They had heard the legend told by local residents and later confirmed the existence of the palace. At this time, part of the complex was still standing. One two-story building was almost untouched. On its inner walls, you could see the remnants of bright red paint. The ceiling was propped up by six wooden columns, carved and covered with gold paint. Outside there were preserved beams. Local residents were afraid to touch the temple. It was believed that those who pollute it, die a terrible death. Unfortunately, the temple was destroyed in the last half of the 1900s. Zealous looters disregarded the historical value of the old buildings destroyed them for logs and stone. Now there is little left that is untouched. Native stonework can only be found beneath a layer of plaster. Modern restorers have begun putting stone slabs back in their places.

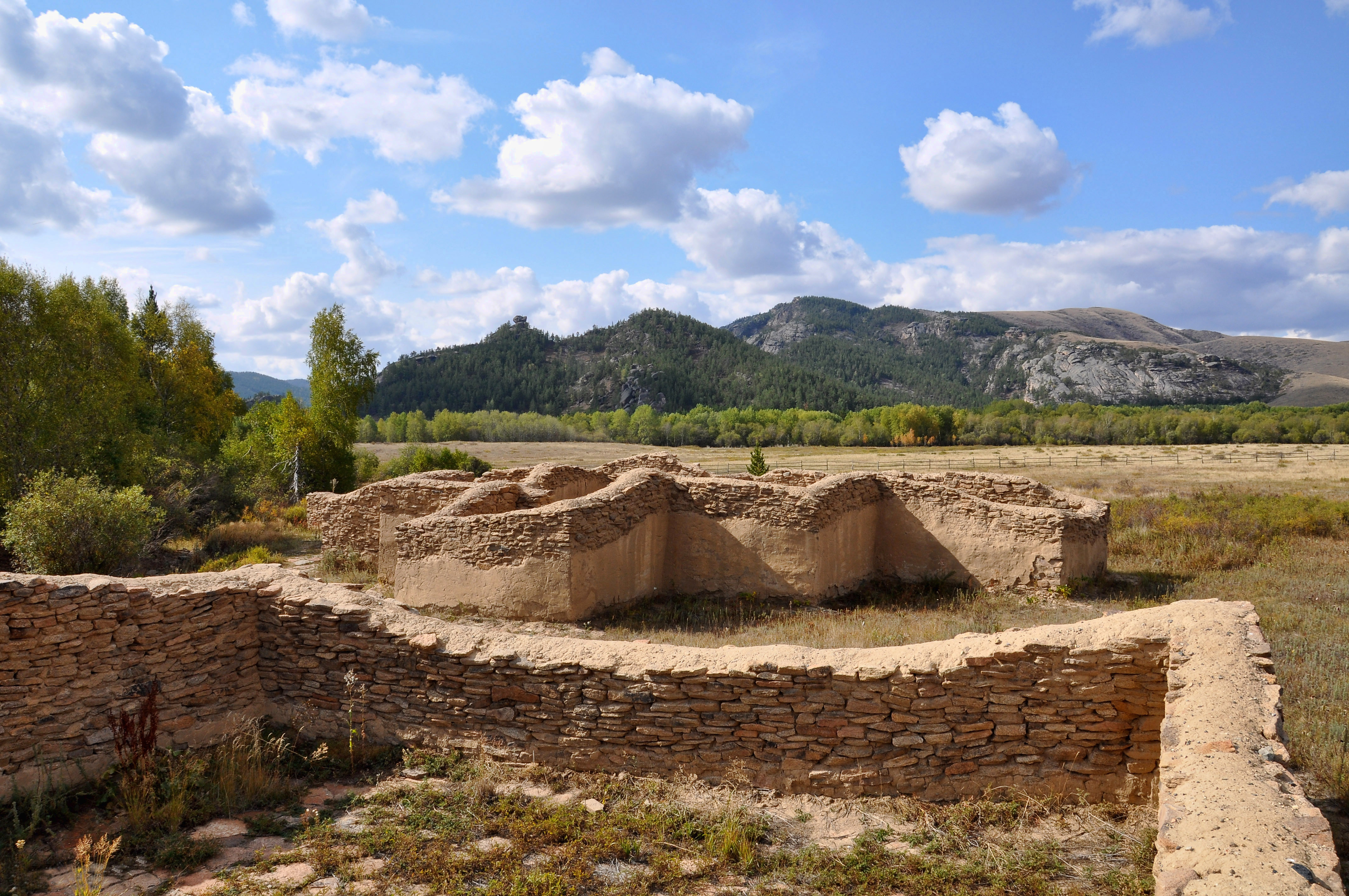
Kyzyl Kensh Palace

The main temple was built in the form of a cross. Here, in the central hall is where the Lama prayed. To the right of the main temple is a smaller temple. Here archaeologists have found evidence of treasure hunters. Thieves broke the stone floor and dug a deep hole, as Buddhist treasures were often buried in underground vaults. In front of the main temple is a picturesque artificial reservoir, which is filled with melt-water in the spring. Scientists maintain that it was formed because the monks had removed the clay for the construction of the palace. There are two other buildings in the complex: the kitchen, which is located to the left of the temple, and a house, which is located a bit further from the water. All four buildings are exactly in their original place. This area has always been visited by pilgrims, but they usually settled in their yurts and left the buildings alone.

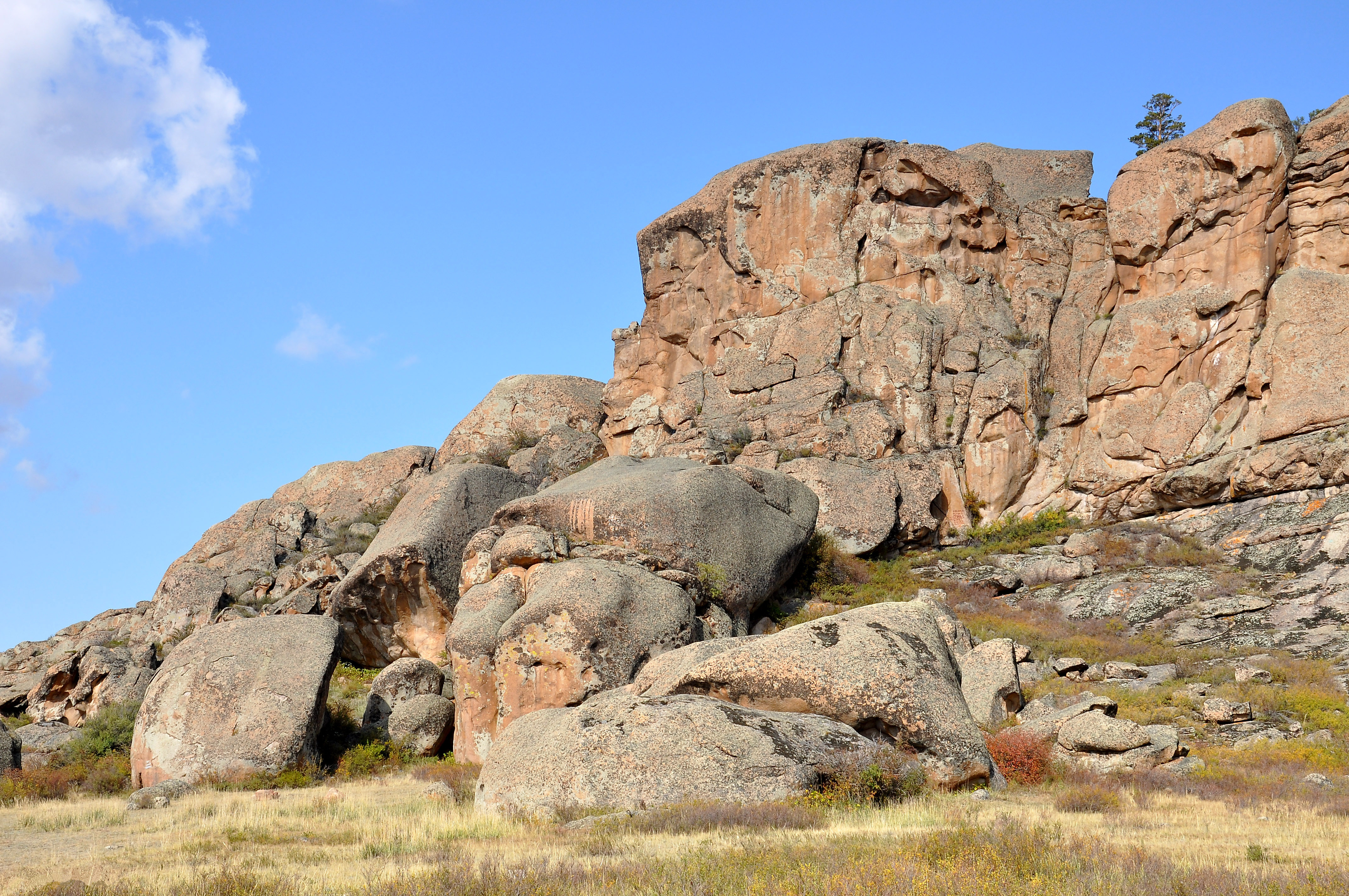

The excavation of Kyzyl Kensh Palace took more than one expedition. In 1825, the legendary archeologist Ket Gore learned of the site while in Russia and became interested. A later expedition led by General Bronevsky excavated rubble and found many interesting artifacts, which were passed on to the Museum of Semipalatinsk. Some artifacts from the Kyzyl Kensh Palace are located in the archaeological museum of Karaganda State University. Some examples of the recovered artifacts: a Manchurian coin, copper men's ring with a silver insert, parts of the palace such as decorations and hooks, guns and lead bullets that allegedly belonged to the guards, nails, beads, and wooden fretwork with traces of the pattern that were painted with paint from real gold.

=== The Ancient City of Kent ===
In the middle of the Kent Mountains is a unique, historical, and cultural monument from the Bronze Age. Archeologists have named the ancient settlement Kent. It was a large city, no less than 30 hectares large, and was home to one thousand people. The town was divided into streets and quarters. There was a quarter for metallurgists, in which copper and bronze has been found. Masters made weapons, equipment, and ornaments. Most likely the inhabitants of Kent were skilled metallurgists. Some ceramics were discovered but were obviously imported, characteristic of southwestern Siberia and Central Asia.

Excavations of Kent have amazed archeologist with an abundance of bronze products and unusual subjects. Currently it is thought that they did not have a writing system. Researchers now guess the area was inhabited for 200–300 years. Nobody knows what happened to Kent or why the people left, though there is a popular theory: in the end of the Bronze Age climatic conditions varied and population density simultaneously increased the need for food. This consequently change wildlife populations. For the wildlife to survive, it was necessary to move in search of better pastures. The people of Kent, right at the beginning of the Iron Age, left the area in search of food.

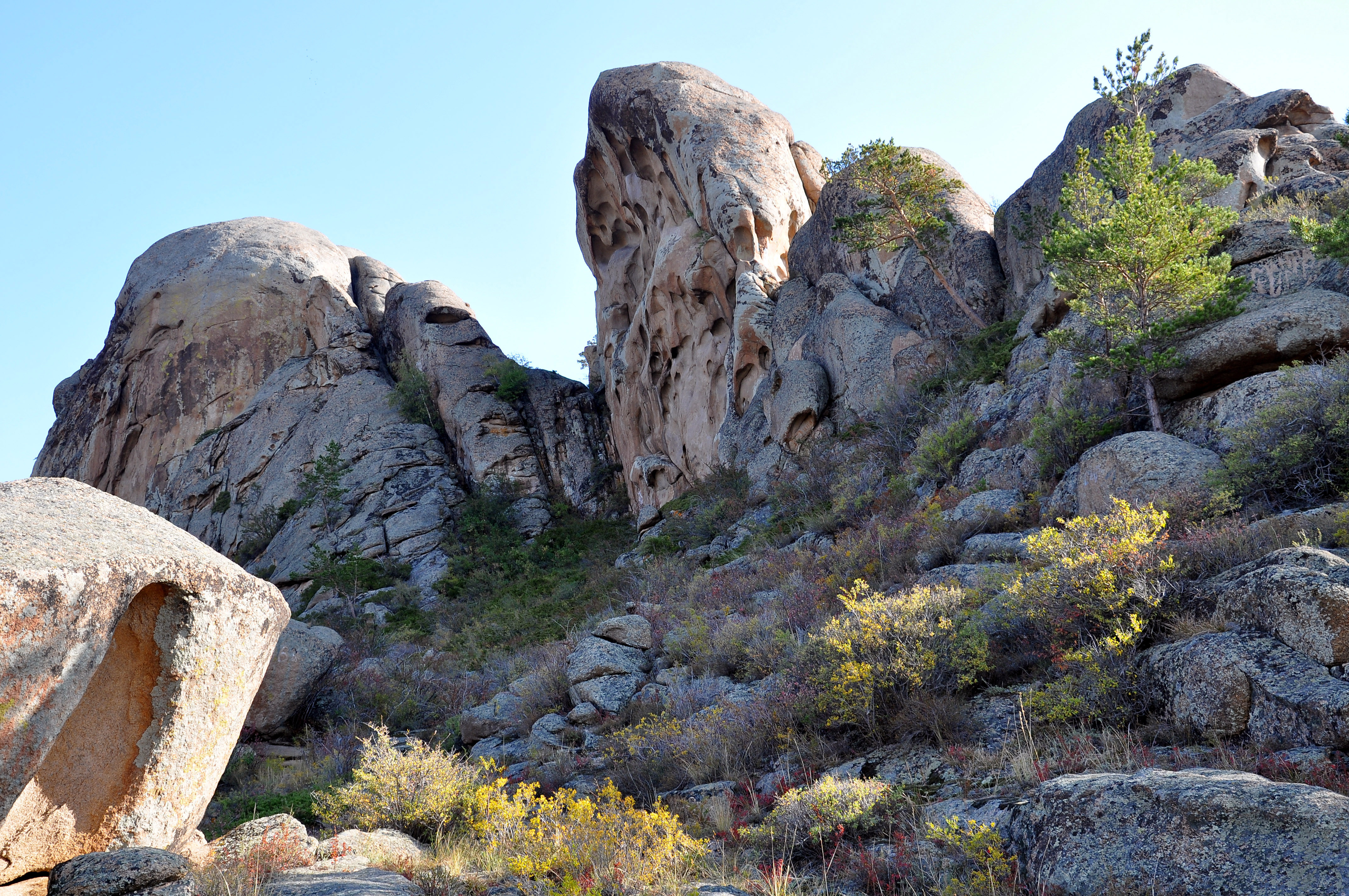

=== Aulietas ===
Aulietas is a location in the Kent Mountains with unique granite rock formations. The formations are a result of the weathering process over the years. This location is a sacred place for local residents.

=== Beldeutas Natural Reserve ===
The Beldeutas Natural Reserve neighbors the Karkaraly National Nature Park. Its purpose is to provide conservation of biological diversity of plants and animals. In Beldeutas, there are rare species of animals such as argali, golden eagle, saker falcon, black stork, eagle owl, and Pallas's cat. All of them are in the Red Book of Kazakhstan. Beldeutas has the highest number of argali in the area.

== Flora and fauna ==
=== Fauna ===
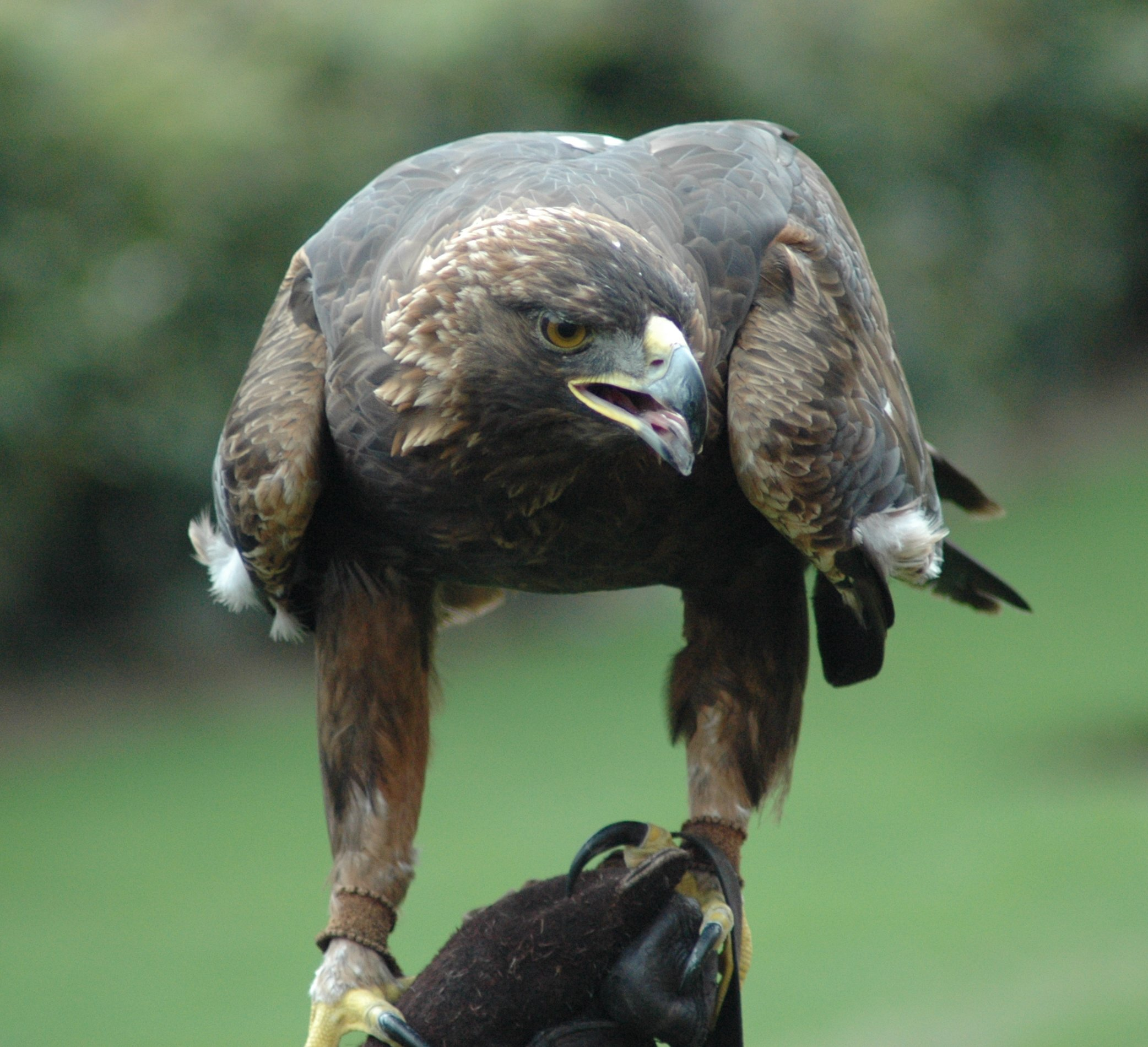
Golden eagle

==== Birds ====
The park is home to 122 species of birds. 11 of these species are in Kazakhstan's Red Book of Protected Species. They are the golden eagle, imperial eagle, steppe eagle, booted eagle, saker falcon, Eurasian eagle-owl, Dalmatian pelican, black stork, whooper swan, swan goose, and Pallas's sandgrouse.

Of these, the imperial eagle, saker falcon, and Dalmatian pelican are protected internationally under the IUCN Red List. The park also has the lesser kestrel, which is protected internationally under the IUCN.

==== Mammals ====
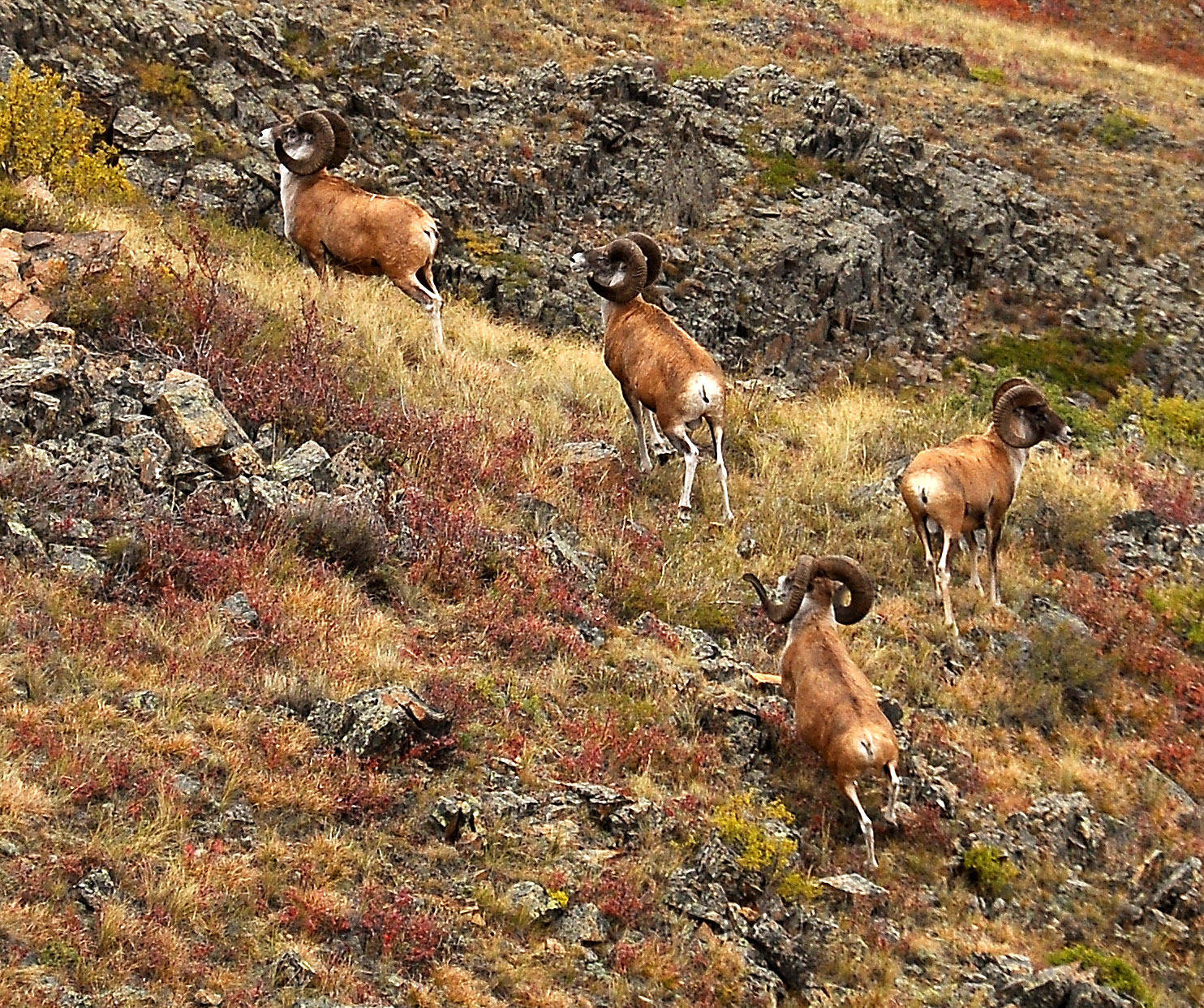
Argali

The park has 45 species of mammals, including wolves, foxs, badgers, wild boar, red deer, Siberian roe deer, elk, argali, lynx, various bats, and others.

The argali in the national park are one of six subspecies of argali living in Kazakhstan. In the Karkaraly National Nature Park the highest numbers of argali are in the Kent Mountains and in the neighboring Beldeutas Natural Reserve. The argali are protected under Kazakhstan's Red Book of Protected Species.

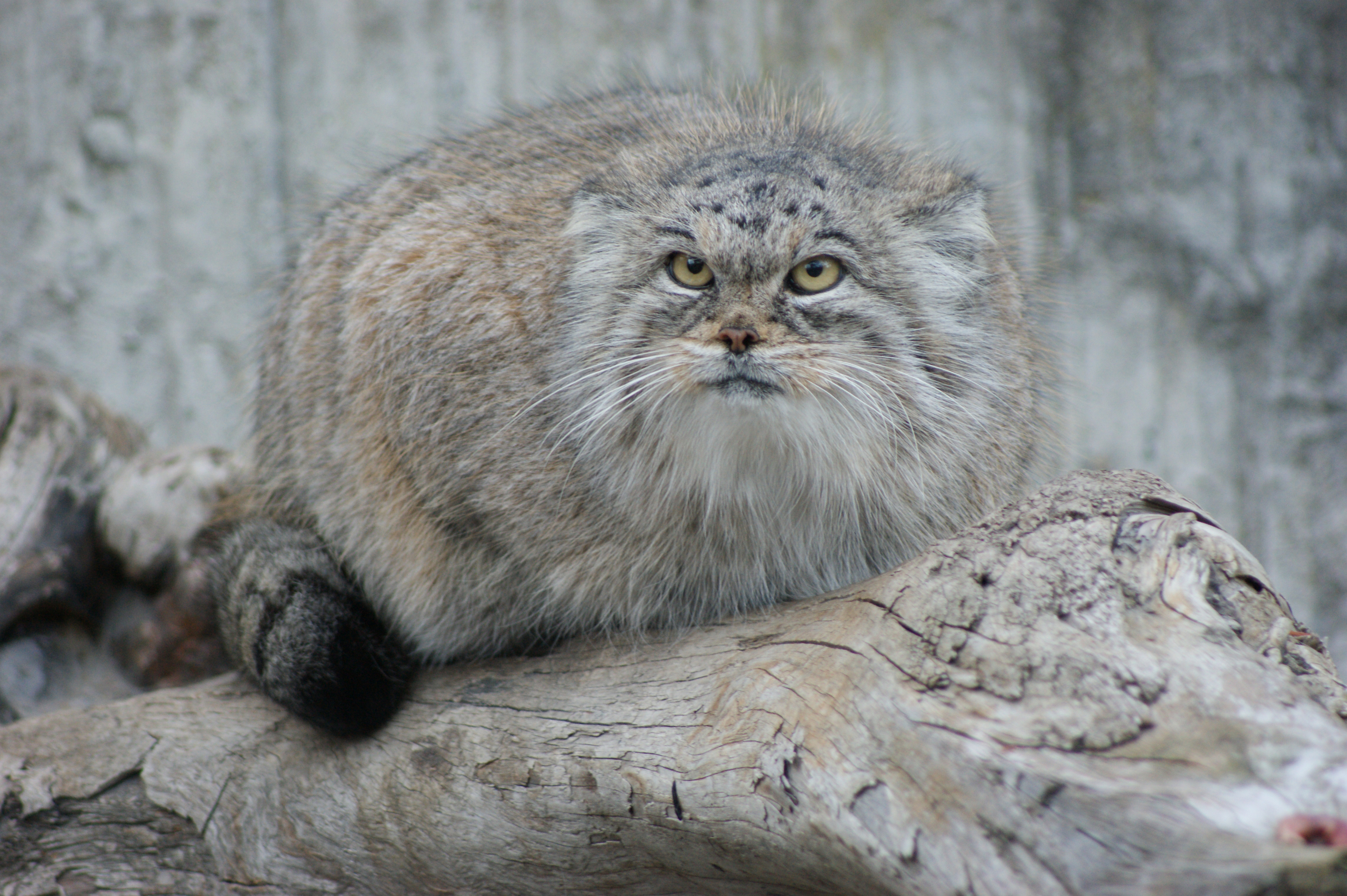
Pallas's cat

The Pallas's cat is the size of a domestic cat, but it is different from an ordinary cat it that it has a dense body with short thick legs and very thick hair. Its eyes are yellow and unlike the domestic cat, its pupils remain round when looking at bright light. This species is very rare. The population continues to decline and they are on the verge of extinction. The exact number of this species is unknown because of its secretive behavior and wide distribution.

==== Reptiles and amphibians ====
The park is home to six species of reptiles and two species of amphibians, including four species of snakes. Two are venomous: the meadow viper and the Siberian pit viper.

=== Flora ===
The park is estimated to contain about 800 species of flora, and is home to 80% of all flora found in central Kazakhstan. Of the 800 or so species that exist within the park, 244 are listed in Kazakhstan's Red Book, including the Kyrgyz birch (Betula kirghisorum SAV.-RYCZG), the smooth sphagnum (Sphagnum teres (Schimp.) Angstr.), thin poppy (Papaver tenellum), spring pheasant's eye (Adonis vernalis L.), and the Karkaraly barberry (Berberis karkaralensis Kornilova et Potapov).

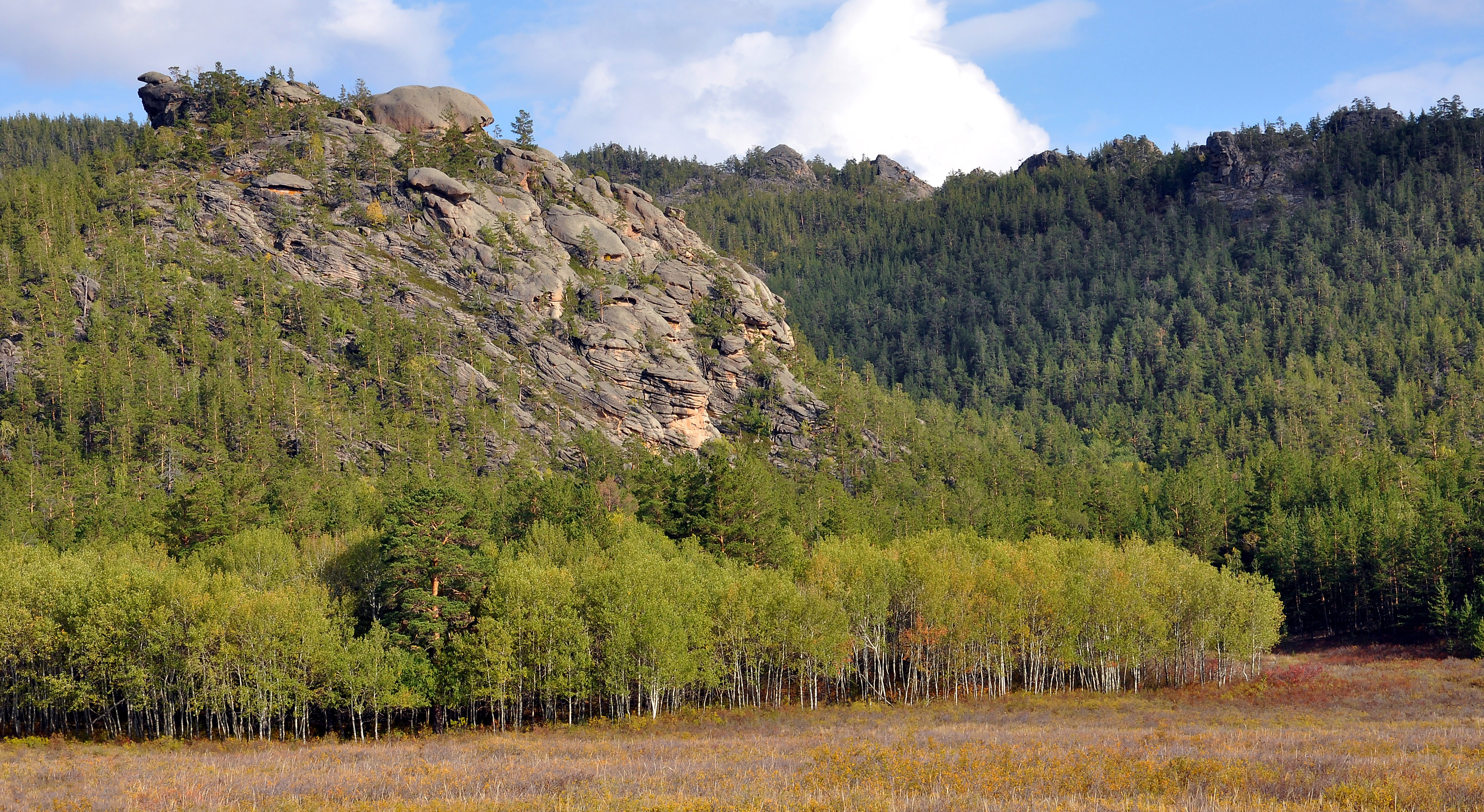
Forest in the Kent Mountains

The forests within the park are made up of pine, birch, aspen, and willow trees. 71.3% of the wooded area in the park are pine trees. Birch forest occupies 10% of the wooded area and aspen forest take up 2%. The underbrush of the park includes Cossack's juniper, Tatar's honeysuckle, and other plants. Shrubs occupy 34% of the total area of the park. There are 87 kinds of medicinal, oil bearing and alkaloid plants in the Karkaraly Mountains.

Because of drought and high winds, 2,525 hectares of the Karkaraly forest were burned by forest fires in 1997–1998. After the fire, the park worked very hard on planting new trees and restoring the forest to its original state. A nursery in the Kent mountains provided the saplings for the re-vegetation project. Fire prevention standards were implemented and the following year 164 hectares were destroyed from 18 separate fires. In 2003, 84 hectares were burned.

== Climate ==
=== Spring ===
Spring in Karkaraly begins in mid-March and lasts until the end of May. During this short period the air temperature rises to an average of 15 C. Snow cover in open areas begins to melt quickly, but in shady canyons the snow may last until the end of May. When snow melts there are numerous streams and small waterfalls, as well as dry riverbeds that fill with melt water. The surrounding nature also begins to wake up: the birds and animals arrive. The primrose, tulips, and other flowers begin to arrive. In May, the trees are covered with young leaves and the forest is filled with even more birds. Within the spring months, May is the most enjoyable

ReactJA

=== Summer ===
In Karkaraly, summer begins in early June. The overall average air temperature for the summer months is 18 C, and in the daytime the air warms up to an average of 25 С (on hot days to 37 C). The hottest month of the year is July. Rainfall in the summer usually comes in the form of showers and thunderstorms. The beginning of summer is characterized by the abundant flowering of plants. In the middle of summer, berries begin to ripen (strawberries, stone berry, raspberry, strawberry, currant), and edible mushrooms are abundant. The summer months are considered the most comfortable time of the year to visit Karkaraly.

=== Autumn ===
Autumn is the most vivid and colorful season in the national park. It starts in mid-September and lasts until mid-November. The weather is particularly good in September, as temperatures begin to drop. In October, there is a possibility of a freeze and there is an increase the number of cloudy days, with possible rain. In the first half of October the average daily temperature falls below 10 C. By the end of October all the migratory birds fly south. The forests in the park are saturated with colors. Many mushrooms can be found during this time of year. In late autumn, most wild animals are changing the colors of their coats and preparing for winter. In the autumn months, the most comfortable months are September and early October.

=== Winter ===
Winter in Karkaraly is cold and snowy. Negative temperatures are recorded from November to March and sustained cold weather lasts an average of 135 days. During this period, the daytime temperature does not usually rise above 0 C and nights are usually very cold. In January–February, the temperature drops to an average of – 20 to -30 C. In abnormally cold years, the temperature can drop to - 49 C. The snow cover reaches heights of 50-60 cm, and in drifts up to 1 meter or more. During the winter, locals and tourists enjoy cross-country skiing on the roads and in the forests.

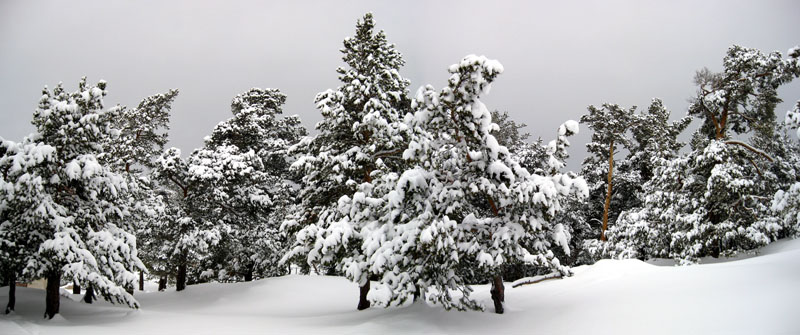
Forest in Karkaraly National Nature Park in winter
