= Beldeutas =

Beldeutas Белдеутас
- Village
- Location in Kazakhstan
- Coordinates: 49°03′31″N 76°14′11″E
- Country: Kazakhstan
- Region: Karaganda Region
- District: Karkaraly District

Population (2009)
  - Total: 198
- Time zone: UTC+6 (East Kazakhstan Time)
- Post code: 100207

Beldeutas (Kazakh: Белдеутас) is a village in Karkaraly District, Karaganda Region, Kazakhstan. It is part of the Amanzholov Rural District (KATO code - 354837400). Population: 198 (2009 census results); 271 (1999 census results).

== Geography ==
The village is located in the Kazakh Uplands, 71 kilometers (44 mi) southeast of Karkaraly, the district administrative center.
